= Douglas, New Brunswick =

Coordinates: 46°13′8.3″N 66°48′41″W

Location of Douglas in New Brunswick

Douglas (2001 population: 2,369) is a Canadian suburban community in York County, New Brunswick.

Located on the east bank of the Saint John River, Douglas developed as a farming community but has witnessed two residential subdivisions developed in recent decades, largely for residents commuting to Fredericton.

== Notable people ==
Canadian writer and Confederation Poet Sir Charles G.D. Roberts, who has been called the "father of Canadian literature," was born in Douglas on January 10, 1860.

== See also ==
- List of communities in New Brunswick
