= Ryerson Press =

Defunct Canadian book publishing company

Ryerson Press McGraw-Hill Ryerson
- Founded: 1919
- Successor: McGraw Hill Education
- Country of origin: Canada
- Headquarters location: Whitby, Ontario
- Publication types: Books
- Official website: www.mheducation.ca

Ryerson Press was a Canadian book publishing company, active from 1919 to 1970. First established by the Methodist Book Room, a division of the Methodist Church of Canada, and operated by the United Church Publishing House after the Methodist Church's merger into the United Church of Canada in 1925, the imprint specialized in historical, educational and literary titles.

In 1970, the United Church Publishing House sold its trade publishing arm to McGraw-Hill, whose Canadian division was renamed McGraw-Hill Ryerson. All outstanding shares of McGraw-Hill Ryerson were acquired by McGraw-Hill Education in 2014. The UCPH still publishes religious titles under its own name, but no longer operates as a general market publisher of non-religious titles.

== History ==
The Methodist Church first established its publishing operations in 1829 with the launch of the weekly newspaper The Christian Guardian. The paper's first editor was Egerton Ryerson. One month later, the church published its first book, starting at first with religious works and later branching out into educational and literary titles.

Prior to 1919, however, its general interest books were published under the name imprint of the individual person who held the position of book steward with the company at the time the book was published; the best known such imprint was William Briggs. Writers published in the William Briggs era included Robert W. Service, Charles G. D. Roberts, Wilfred Campbell and Catharine Parr Traill.

Shortly after succeeding Briggs as steward in 1919, Samuel W. Fallis decided to create a standard, consistent brand for the company, and chose to honour Ryerson for his founding role. Fallis selected Lorne Pierce as chief editor of the company, a role Pierce held until 1960.

Under Pierce's editorship, the company published educational textbooks, using the profits from this line of business to publish literary work by writers including Frederick Philip Grove, E. J. Pratt, A. J. M. Smith, A. M. Klein, P. K. Page, Dorothy Livesay, Earle Birney, Louis Dudek, Hugh Hood and Marjorie Pickthall. The company also created the Ryerson Fiction Award, an award program for emerging writers which was active from 1942 to 1960. Book series published included The Ryerson Makers of Canadian Literature and the Canadian History Readers.

The company's sale to McGraw Hill in 1970 prompted an outcry from many writers and cultural critics, who believed Canadian ownership of its own book publishing industry to be essential in maintaining Canadian cultural identity. The sale occasioned a protest in which novelist Graeme Gibson draped the flag of the United States around the statue of Egerton Ryerson on the grounds of Ryerson Polytechnical Institute; Gibson led protesters in a rendition of "I'm a Yankee Doodle Dandy" after climbing down from the statue. A royal commission was also established to review government rules around foreign ownership in the publishing industry. The company continued to publish Canadian literature for a number of years, including several early works by Alice Munro, although it later shifted to concentrate exclusively on educational and business non-fiction titles.

The company's headquarters, located at 299 Queen Street West in Toronto, were purchased in 1985 by CHUM Limited, becoming the home of the company's television broadcasters such as Citytv and MuchMusic. As of 2024, it remained the home of many of Bell Media's television operations in Toronto.

In 2017, McGraw-Hill Ryerson Limited donated its Ryerson Press collection (consisting of books and related documentation amounting to approximately 5000 items) to Ryerson University Library's Archives and Special Collections.

On May 11, 2017, McGraw-Hill Education announced the sale of the K-12 business holdings of McGraw-Hill Ryerson to Canadian educational publisher, Nelson.
