= Canadian literature =

Canadian literature is often divided into French- and English-language literatures, which are rooted in the literary traditions of France and Britain, respectively. The earliest Canadian narratives were of travel and exploration. This progressed into three major themes of historical Canadian literature: nature, frontier life, and Canada's position within the world, all of which tie into the garrison mentality. The evolution of Canadian literature is intricately linked to its historical and social contexts, often mirroring the challenges and triumphs of Canadian society. As Canadian literature progressed into the 20th and 21st centuries, it began to address a broader array of subjects and themes, such as feminism and LGBTQ rights, immigrant experiences, environmental issues, the relationship with Indigenous peoples, and Canadian values and identity.

Financial support from governmental bodies, such as the Canada Council for the Arts and various provincial grant programs, facilitates the creation, publication, and promotion of works by Canadian authors. Numerous Canadian authors have accumulated international literary awards including the Nobel Prize in Literature, the Booker Prize, and the Pulitzer Prize for Fiction. Canadian literary prizes include the Governor General's Literary Awards, the Giller Prize, the Atwood Gibson Writers' Trust Fiction Prize, the Latner Griffin Writers' Trust Poetry Prize, the Burt Award for First Nations, Inuit and Métis Literature and several accolades for literature aimed at children.

== Indigenous literatures ==
Indigenous peoples of Canada are culturally diverse. Each group has its own literature, language and culture. The term "Indigenous literature" therefore can be misleading, as writer Jeannette Armstrong states in one interview, "I would stay away from the idea of "Native" literature, there is no such thing. There is Mohawk literature, there is Okanagan literature, but there is no generic Native in Canada".

== French-Canadian literature ==
In 1802, the Lower Canada legislative library was founded. All books it contained were subsequently moved to the Canadian parliament in Montreal when the two Canadas, Lower and Upper, were united. On April 25, 1849, the Canadian parliament was burned along with thousands of French Canadian books and a few hundred English books. A consequence of this event was the mistaken impression that from the early settlements until the 1820s, Quebec had virtually no literature.

It was the rise of Quebec patriotism and the 1837 Lower Canada Rebellion, in addition to a modern system of primary school education, which led to the rise of French-Canadian fiction. L'influence d'un livre by Philippe-Ignace-Francois Aubert de Gaspé is widely regarded as the first French-Canadian novel. The genres which first became popular were the rural novel and the historical novel. French authors were influential, especially authors like Balzac.

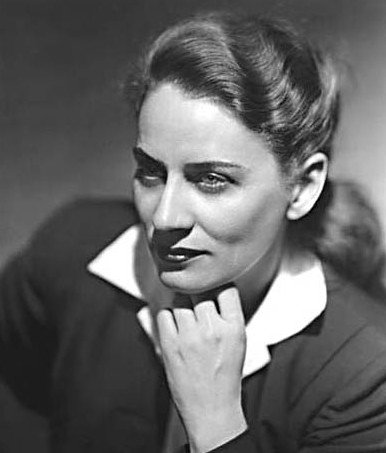
Gabrielle Roy was a notable French Canadian author.

In 1866, Father Henri-Raymond Casgrain became one of Quebec's first literary theorists. He argued that literature's goal should be to project an image of proper Catholic morality. However, a few authors like Louis-Honoré Fréchette and Arthur Buies broke the conventions to write more interesting works.

This pattern continued until the 1930s with a new group of authors educated at the Université Laval and the Université de Montréal. Novels with psychological and sociological foundations became the norm. Gabrielle Roy and Anne Hébert even began to earn international acclaim, which had not happened to French-Canadian literature before. During this period, Quebec theatre, which had previously been melodramas and comedies, became far more involved.

French-Canadian literature began to greatly expand with the turmoil of the Second World War, the beginnings of industrialization in the 1950s, and most especially the Quiet Revolution in the 1960s. French-Canadian literature also began to attract a great deal of attention globally, with Acadian novelist Antonine Maillet winning the Prix Goncourt in 1979. An experimental branch of Québécois literature also developed; for instance the poet Nicole Brossard wrote in a formalist style. In 1979, Roch Carrier wrote the story The Hockey Sweater, which highlighted the cultural and social tensions between English and French speaking Canada.

== Literature in English Before Confederation ==
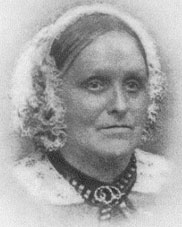
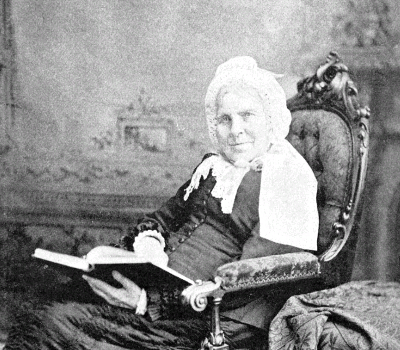
Sisters Susanna Moodie and Catherine Parr Traill wrote several stories about their experiences in the Canadas.

Because Canada only officially became a country following the unification, or 'confederation' of several colonies, including Upper and Lower Canada, into one nation on July 1, 1867, it has been argued that literature written before this time was colonial. The book often considered to be the first work of Canadian literature is The History of Emily Montague by Frances Brooke, published in 1769. Brooke wrote the novel in Sillery, Quebec following the Conquest of New France. Susanna Moodie and Catharine Parr Traill, English sisters who adopted the country as their own, moved to Upper Canada in 1832. They recorded their experiences as pioneers in Parr Traill's The Backwoods of Canada (1836) and Canadian Crusoes (1852), and Moodie's Roughing It in the Bush (1852) and Life in the Clearings (1853). However, both women wrote until their deaths, placing them in the country for more than 50 years and certainly well past Confederation. Moreover, their books often dealt with survival and the rugged Canadian environment; these themes re-appear in other Canadian works, including Margaret Atwood's Survival. Moodie and Parr Trail's sister, Agnes Strickland, remained in England and wrote elegant royal biographies, creating a stark contrast between Canadian and English literatures.

John Richardson, born at Fort George or in Queenston on the Niagara River in 1796, wrote historical novels set on the colonial frontier that take inspiration from Walter Scott and parallel the interests of James Fenimore Cooper in creating a romantic history for North America. Richardson's most enduring work, Wacousta (1832) is set at the time of Pontiac's uprising during the 1760s and relates a complex story of betrayal, disguise and slaughter.

One of the earliest Canadian writers virtually always included in Canadian literary anthologies is Thomas Chandler Haliburton (1796–1865), born and raised in Nova Scotia, who died just two years before Canada's official birth. He is remembered for his comic character, Sam Slick, who appeared in The Clockmaker and other humorous works throughout Haliburton's life.

== After 1867 ==
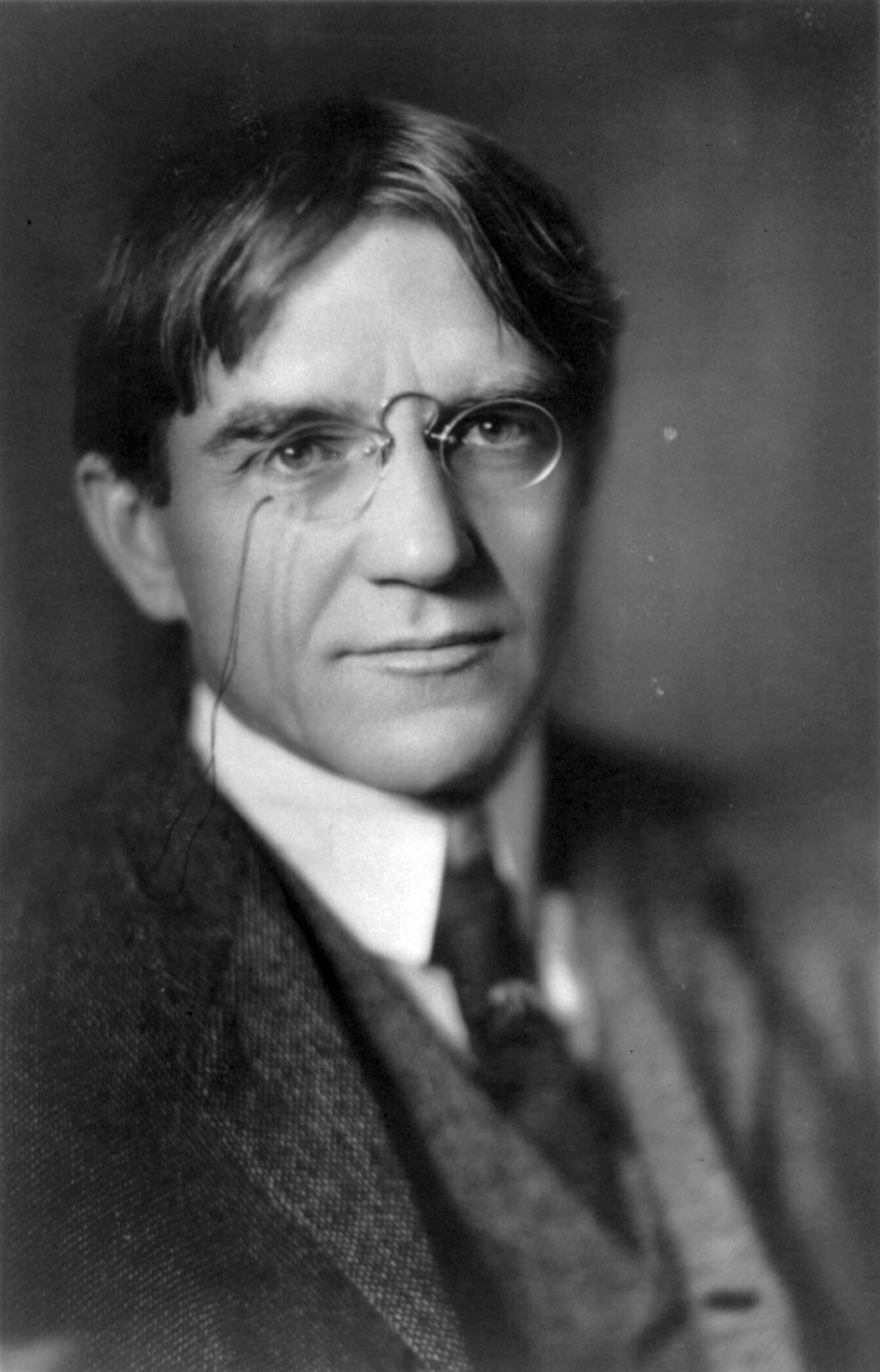
Poet Charles G. D. Roberts belonged to an informal group known as the Confederation Poets.

A group of poets now known as the "Confederation Poets", including Charles G. D. Roberts, Archibald Lampman, Bliss Carman, Duncan Campbell Scott, and William Wilfred Campbell, came to prominence in the 1880s and 1890s. Choosing the world of nature as their inspiration, their work was drawn from their own experiences and, at its best, written in their own tones. Isabella Valancy Crawford, Annie Campbell Huestis, Frederick George Scott, and Francis Sherman are also sometimes associated with this group.

During this period, E. Pauline Johnson and William Henry Drummond were writing popular poetry – Johnson's based on her part-Mohawk heritage, and Drummond, the Poet of the Habitant, writing dialect verse.

L. M. Montgomery's novel Anne of Green Gables was first published in 1908. It has sold an estimated 50 million copies and is one of the best selling books worldwide. Atlantic Canadian folklore and song became the subject of a Maritime literary revival in the 1920s, centered on Nova Scotia. Folklore collection expressed an interest in the region's pre-industrial lifestyle and a romantic vision of the "hardiness, simplicity, and virtues of the seafaring life". Poets and novelists participating in the literary revival included the Song Fishermen.

Between 1915 and 1925, Stephen Leacock (1869–1944) was the best selling humour writer in the world. His best known book of fiction, Sunshine Sketches of a Little Town was published in 1912.

Three of Canada's most important post-World War I novelists were Hugh MacLennan (1907–1990), W.O. Mitchell (1914–1998), and Morley Callaghan (1903–1990). MacLennan's best-known works are Barometer Rising (1941), The Watch That Ends the Night (1957), and Two Solitudes (1945), while Callaghan is best known for Such Is My Beloved (1934), The Loved and the Lost (1951), and More Joy in Heaven (1937). Mitchell's most-loved novel is Who Has Seen the Wind.

Perhaps reacting against a tradition that largely emphasized the wilderness and the small town and country experience, Leonard Cohen wrote the novel Beautiful Losers (1966). It was labelled by one reviewer "the most revolting book ever written in Canada". In time, however, this novel was considered a Canadian classic. Despite beginning his career as a poet of major importance, Cohen is perhaps best known as a folk singer and songwriter, with an international following.

Canadian author Farley Mowat is best known for his work Never Cry Wolf (1963) and his Governor General's Award-winning children's book, Lost in the Barrens (1956).

Following World War II, writers such as Mavis Gallant, Mordecai Richler, Norman Levine, Sheila Watson, Margaret Laurence and Irving Layton added to the Modernist influence in Canadian literature previously introduced by F. R. Scott, A. J. M. Smith and others associated with the McGill Fortnightly. This influence, at first, was not broadly appreciated. Norman Levine's Canada Made Me, a travelogue that presented a sour interpretation of the country in 1958, for example, was widely rejected.

After 1967, the country's centennial year, the national government increased funding to publishers and numerous small presses began operating throughout the country. The best-known Canadian children's writers include L. M. Montgomery and Monica Hughes.

== Contemporary Canadian literature: After 1967 ==
Arguably, the best-known living Canadian writer internationally (especially since the deaths of Robertson Davies and Mordecai Richler) is Margaret Atwood, a prolific novelist, poet, and literary critic. Other great 20th-century Canadian authors include Margaret Laurence, Mavis Gallant, Michael Ondaatje, Carol Shields, Alistair MacLeod, Mazo de la Roche, and Gabrielle Roy.

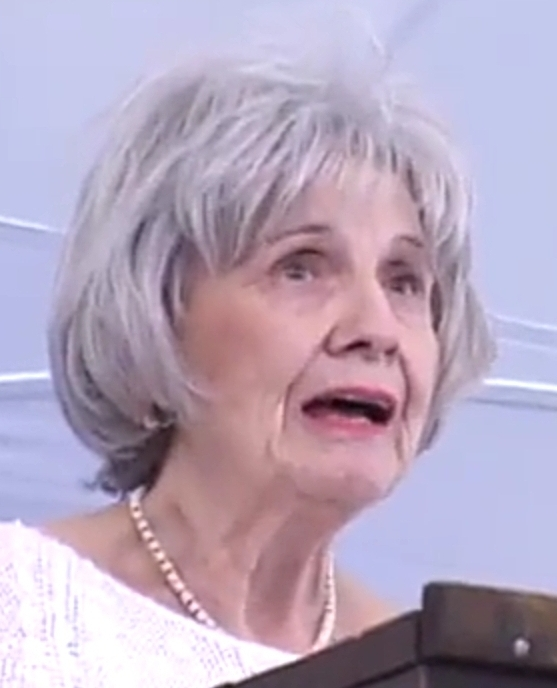
Short story writer Alice Munro won the Nobel Prize in Literature in 2013.

This group, along with Nobel Laureate Alice Munro, who has been called the best living writer of short stories in English, were part of a 'new wave' of Canadian writers, some starting their careers in the 1950s. The first to elevate Canadian Literature to the world stage were Lucy Maud Montgomery, Stephen Leacock, Mazo de la Roche, and Morley Callaghan. During the post-war decades Canadian literature, as were Australian and New Zealand literature, viewed as an appendage to British Literature. When academic Clara Thomas decided in the 1940s to concentrate on Canadian literature for her master's thesis, the idea was so novel and so radical that word of her decision reached The Globe and Mail books editor William Arthur Deacon, who then personally reached out to Thomas to pledge his and the newspaper's resources in support of her work.

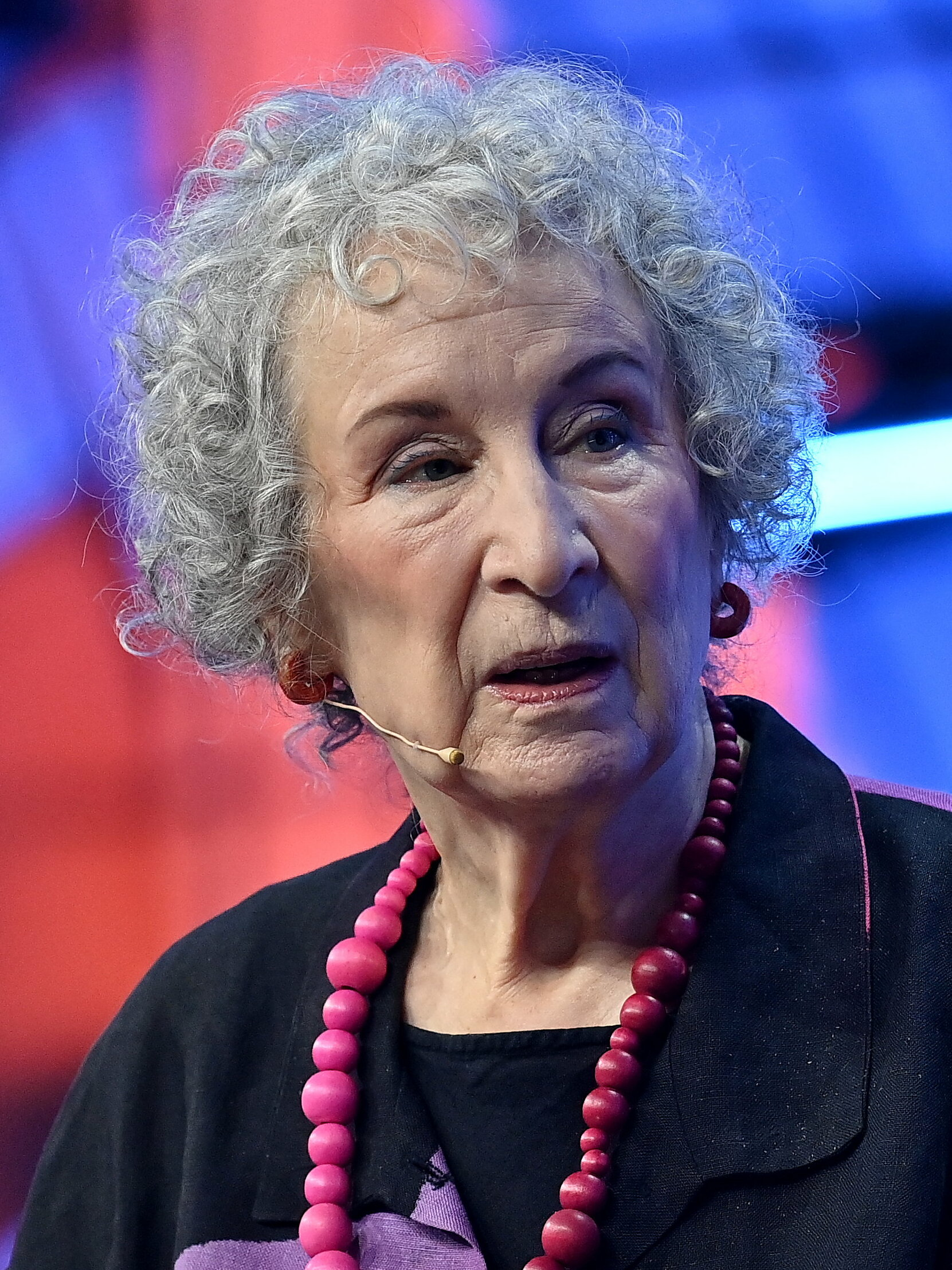
Author Margaret Atwood has suggested that during the 1970s Canadian literature was still looking for a national identity.

Other major Canadian novelists include Carol Shields, Lawrence Hill, and Alice Munro. Carol Shields' novel The Stone Diaries won the 1995 Pulitzer Prize for Fiction, and another novel, Larry's Party, won the Orange Prize in 1998. Lawrence Hill's Book of Negroes won the 2008 Commonwealth Writers' Prize Overall Best Book Award, while Alice Munro became the first Canadian to win the Nobel Prize in Literature in 2013. Munro also received the Man Booker International Prize in 2009.

In the 1960s, a renewed sense of nation helped foster new voices in Canadian poetry, including: Margaret Atwood, Michael Ondaatje, Leonard Cohen, Eli Mandel and Margaret Avison. Others such as Al Purdy, Milton Acorn, and Earle Birney, already published, produced some of their best work during this period.

The TISH Poetry movement in Vancouver brought about poetic innovation from Jamie Reid, George Bowering, Fred Wah, Frank Davey, Daphne Marlatt, David Cull, and Lionel Kearns. Canadian poets have been expanding the boundaries of originality: Christian Bök, Ken Babstock, Karen Solie, Lynn Crosbie, Patrick Lane, George Elliott Clarke and Barry Dempster have all imprinted their unique consciousnesses onto the map of Canadian imagery. A notable anthology of Canadian poetry is The New Oxford book of Canadian Verse, edited by Margaret Atwood (ISBN 0-19-540450-5).

Anne Carson is probably the best known Canadian poet living today. Carson in 1996 won the Lannan Literary Award for poetry. The foundation's awards in 2006 for poetry, fiction and nonfiction each came with $US 150,000.

=== Canadian authors who have won international awards ===
Nobel Prize in Literature

- Alice Munro (2013)
- Anne Carson (2026)

International Booker Prize

- Alice Munro (2009)

Booker Prize

- Michael Ondaatje, The English Patient (1992)
- Margaret Atwood, The Blind Assassin (2000)
- Yann Martel, Life of Pi (2002)
- Margaret Atwood, The Testaments (2019)

Pulitzer Prize for Fiction

- Carol Shields, The Stone Diaries (1995)

National Book Critics Circle Award

- Carol Shields, The Stone Diaries (1994)

International Dublin Literary Award

- Alistair MacLeod, No Great Mischief (2001)
- Rawi Hage, De Niro's Game (2008)

Orange Prize

- Anne Michaels, Fugitive Pieces (1997)
- Carol Shields, Larry's Party (1998)

Commonwealth Writers' Prize

- Olive Senior, Summer Lightning (1987)
- Mordecai Richler, Solomon Gursky Was Here (1990)
- Rohinton Mistry, Such a Long Journey (1991)
- Rohinton Mistry, A Fine Balance (1996)
- Austin Clarke, The Polished Hoe (2003)
- Lawrence Hill, The Book of Negroes (2008)

Peace Prize of the German Book Trade

- Margaret Atwood (2017)

== Awards ==
There are a number of notable Canadian awards for literature:

- The Atlantic Writers Competition highlights talent across the Atlantic Provinces.
- Books in Canada First Novel Award for the best first novel of the year
- Canadian Authors Association Awards for Adult Literature, honouring works by Canadian writers that achieve excellence without sacrificing popular appeal since 1975
- CBC Literary Awards
- Canada Council Molson Prize for distinguished contributions to Canada's cultural and intellectual heritage
- Danuta Gleed Literary Award for a first collection of short fiction by a Canadian author writing in English
- Dayne Ogilvie Prize for an emerging writer in the lesbian, gay, bisexual or transgender communities
- Doug Wright Awards for graphic literature and novels
- Floyd S. Chalmers Canadian Play Awards for best Canadian play staged by a Canadian theatre company
- Hilary Weston Writers' Trust Prize for Nonfiction for best work of nonfiction
- Gerald Lampert Award for the best new poet
- Lane Anderson Award for best Canadian non-fiction science
- Giller Prize for the best Canadian novel or book of short stories in English
- Governor General's Awards for the best Canadian fiction, poetry, non-fiction, drama, and translation, in both English and French
- Griffin Poetry Prize for the best book of poetry, one award each for a Canadian poet and an international poet
- Indigenous Voices Awards for works of literature by First Nations, Métis and Inuit writers
- Marian Engel Award for female writers in mid-career
- Matt Cohen Award to honour a Canadian writer for a lifetime of distinguished achievement
- Milton Acorn Poetry Awards for an outstanding "people's poet"
- National Business Book Award
- Paragraphe Hugh MacLennan Prize for Fiction
- Pat Lowther Award for poetry written by a woman
- International Council for Canadian Studies' Pierre Savard Award ( e.g. Faye Hammill for Literary Culture and Female Authorship in Canada)
- Prix Aurora Awards for Canadian science fiction and fantasy, in English and French
- RBC Bronwen Wallace Award for Emerging Writers
- Rogers Writers' Trust Fiction Prize for the best work of fiction
- Shaughnessy Cohen Award for Political Writing
- Stephen Leacock Award For Humour
- W.O. Mitchell Literary Prize for a writer who has made a distinguished lifetime contribution both to Canadian literature and to mentoring new writers
- Room of One's Own Annual Award for poetry and literature
- 3-Day Novel Contest annual literary marathon, born in Canada
- Writers' Trust Engel/Findley Award for a distinguished writer in mid-career
- Writers' Trust / McClelland & Stewart Journey Prize

Awards For Children's and Young Adult Literature:

- Young Adult Novel Prize of the Atlantic Writers Competition
- R.Ross Annett Award for Children's Literature
- Geoffrey Bilson Award for Historical Fiction
- Ann Connor Brimer Award
- Canadian Library Association Book of the Year Award for Children
- CLA Young Adult Canadian Book Award
- Sheila A. Egoff Children's Literature Prize
- Elizabeth Mrazik-Cleaver Canadian Picture Book Award
- Floyd S. Chalmers Award for Theatre for Young Adults
- Amelia Frances Howard-Gibbon Illustrator's Award
- Information Book of the Year
- I0DE Book Award
- Janet Savage Blachford Prize for Children's and Young Adult Literature
- Max and Greta Ebel Memorial Award for Children's Writing
- Norma Fleck Award for children's non-fiction
- Governor-General's Awards for the best Canadian children's literature, text-based or illustrated, in both English and French
- Vicky Metcalf Award for Children's Literature

== See also ==
- By author: Canadian women; Acadians, Aboriginal peoples in Canada; Irish Canadians; Italian-Canadians: South-Asian-Canadian
- Literary period: "The Confederation Poets", "Canadian postmoderns" or "Canadian Poets Between the Wars."
- Canadian poetry
- Canadian science fiction
- Lists of Canadian writers
- Indigenous literatures in Canada
- Latin American Canadians § Writers
- Arab Canadians § Filmmakers and writers
- Romani literature § Canada
- The Canadian Centenary Series
- Canada Reads
- Basodee
- Canadian content
- Theatre of Canada
- Cinema of Canada
