= Bliss Carman =

Canadian poet

Bliss Carman FRSC
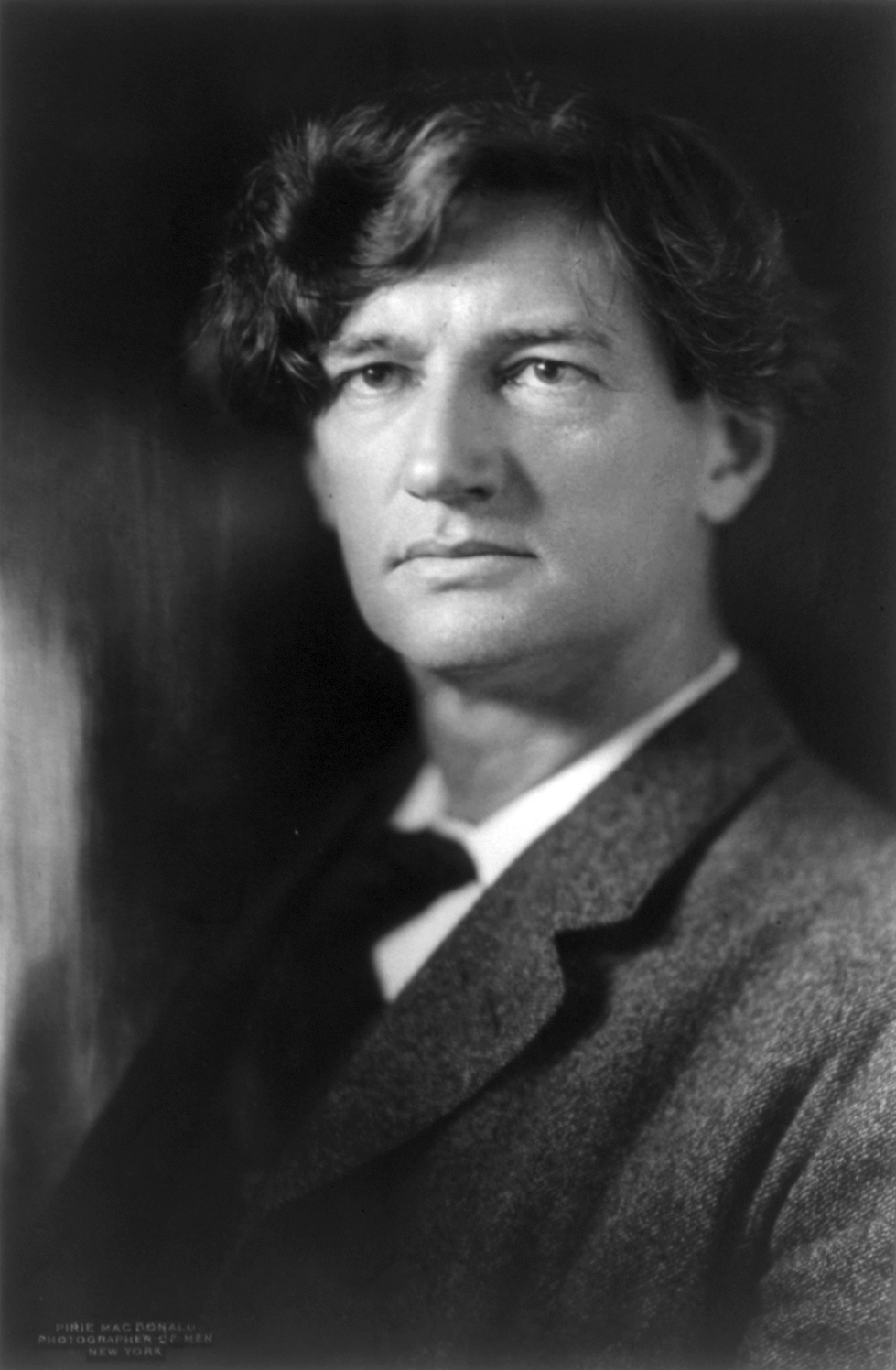
- 1903 portrait by Pirie MacDonald
- Born: William Bliss Carman; April 15, 1861; Fredericton, New Brunswick, Canada
- Died: June 8, 1929 (aged 68); New Canaan, Connecticut, US
- Resting place: Fredericton, New Brunswick
- Citizenship: British subject
- Education: University of New Brunswick; University of Edinburgh; Harvard University
- Occupation: Poet
- Writing career
- Language: English
- Genre: Poetry
- Notable works: Low Tide on Grand Pré, Songs from Vagabondia, Sappho: 100 Lyrics
- Notable awards: Lorne Pierce Medal (1928); Robert Frost Medal (1930); FRSC
- Movements: Confederation Poets, The Song Fishermen

William Bliss Carman (April 15, 1861 – June 8, 1929) was a Canadian poet who lived most of his life in the United States, where he achieved international fame. He was acclaimed as Canada's poet laureate during his later years.

In Canada, Carman is classed as one of the Confederation Poets, a group which also included Charles G.D. Roberts (his cousin), Archibald Lampman, and Duncan Campbell Scott. "Of the group, Carman had the surest lyric touch and achieved the widest international recognition. But unlike others, he never attempted to secure his income by novel writing, popular journalism, or non-literary employment. He remained a poet, supplementing his art with critical commentaries on literary ideas, philosophy, and aesthetics."

== Life ==
William Bliss Carman was born on April 15, 1861, in Fredericton, New Brunswick. "Bliss" was his mother's maiden name. He was the great grandson of United Empire Loyalists who fled to Nova Scotia after the American Revolution, settling in New Brunswick (then part of Nova Scotia). His literary roots run deep with an ancestry that includes a mother who was a descendant of Daniel Bliss of Concord, Massachusetts, the great-uncle of Ralph Waldo Emerson. His sister, Jean, married the botanist and historian William Francis Ganong. And on his mother's side he was a first cousin to the siblings Charles (later Sir Charles) G. D. Roberts and Elizabeth Roberts MacDonald.

=== Education and early career ===
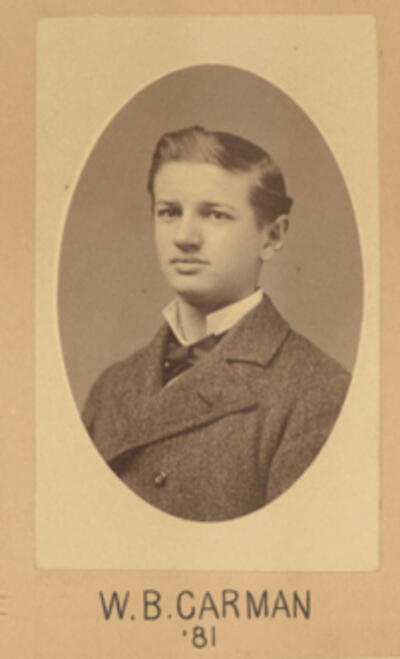
Carman in 1879

Carman was first educated through a private tutor until 1872 due to medical issues stemmed from a severe nose injury he received at the age of four. Afterwards, he attended the Fredericton Collegiate School where he came under the influence of headmaster George Robert Parkin, who gave him a love of classical literature and introduced him to the poetry of Dante Gabriel Rossetti and Algernon Charles Swinburne. He was later educated at the University of New Brunswick (UNB), from which he received a bachelor's degree in 1881. His first published poem was in the UNB Monthly in 1879. He then spent a year at Oxford and the University of Edinburgh (1882–1883), but returned home to receive his master's degree from UNB in 1884.

After the death of his father in January 1885 and his mother in February 1886, Carman enrolled in Harvard University (1886–1887). At Harvard he moved in a literary circle that included American poet Richard Hovey, who would become his close friend and his collaborator on the successful Vagabondia poetry series. Carman and Hovey were members of the "Visionists" circle along with Herbert Copeland and F. Holland Day, who would later form the Boston publishing firm Copeland & Day that would launch Vagabondia.

After Harvard Carman briefly returned to Canada, but was back in Boston by February 1890. "Boston is one of the few places where my critical education and tastes could be of any use to me in earning money," he wrote. "New York and London are about the only other places." Unable to find employment in Boston, he moved to New York City and became literary editor of the New York Independent at the grand sum of $20 a week. There he could help his Canadian friends get published, in the process "introducing Canadian poets to its readers." However, Carman was never a good fit at the semi-religious weekly, and he was summarily dismissed in 1892. "Brief stints would follow with Current Literature, Cosmopolitan, The Chap-Book, and The Atlantic Monthly, but after 1895 he would be strictly a contributor to the magazines and newspapers, never an editor in any department."

To make matters worse, Carman's first book of poetry, 1893's Low Tide on Grand Pré, was not a success; it was not published in Canada, and distribution in the US was hampered when the publisher went bankrupt.

=== Literary success ===
At this low point, Songs of Vagabondia, the first Hovey-Carman collaboration, was published by Copeland & Day in 1894. It was an immediate success. "No one could have been more surprised at the tremendous popularity of these care-free celebrations (the first of the three collections went through seven rapid editions) than the young authors, Richard Hovey and Bliss Carman." Songs of Vagabondia would ultimately "go through sixteen printings (ranging from 500 to 1000 copies) over the next thirty years. The three Vagabondia volumes that followed fell slightly short of that record, but each went through numerous printings. Carman and Hovey quickly found themselves with a cult following, especially among college students, who responded to the poetry's anti-materialistic themes, its celebration of individual freedom, and its glorification of comradeship."

The success of Songs of Vagabondia prompted another Boston firm, Stone & Kimball, to reissue Low Tide... and to hire Carman as the editor of its literary journal, The Chapbook. The next year, though, the editor's job went West (with Stone & Kimball) to Chicago, while Carman opted to remain in Boston.

"In Boston in 1895, he worked on a new poetry book, Behind the Arras, which he placed with a prominent Boston publisher (Lamson, Wolffe).... He published two more books of verse with Lamson, Wolffe." He also began writing a weekly column for the Boston Evening Transcript, which ran from 1895 to 1900.

In 1896, Carman met Mary Perry King, who became the greatest and longest-lasting female influence in his life. Mrs. King became his patron: "She put pence in his purse, and food in his mouth, when he struck bottom and, what is more, she often put a song on his lips when he despaired, and helped him sell it." According to Carman's roommate, Mitchell Kennerley, "On rare occasions they had intimate relations at 10 E. 16 which they always advised me of by leaving a bunch of violets — Mary Perry's favorite flower — on the pillow of my bed." If he knew of the latter, Dr. King did not object: "He even supported her involvement in the career of Bliss Carman to the extent that the situation developed into something close to a ménage à trois" with the Kings.

Through Mrs. King's influence Carman became an advocate of 'unitrinianism,' a philosophy which "drew on the theories of François-Alexandre-Nicolas-Chéri Delsarte to develop a strategy of mind-body-spirit harmonization aimed at undoing the physical, psychological, and spiritual damage caused by urban modernity." This shared belief created a bond between Mrs. King and Carman but estranged him somewhat from his former friends.

In 1899 Lamson, Wolffe was taken over by the Boston firm of Small, Maynard & Co., who had also acquired the rights to Low Tide... "The rights to all Carman's books were now held by one publisher and, in lieu of earnings, Carman took a financial stake in the company. When Small, Maynard failed in 1903, Carman lost all his assets."

Down but not out, Carman signed with another Boston company, L.C. Page, and began to churn out new work. Page published seven books of new Carman poetry between 1902 and 1905. As well, the firm released three books based on Carman's Transcript columns, and a prose work on unitrinianism, The Making of Personality, that he'd written with Mrs. King. "Page also helped Carman rescue his 'dream project,' a deluxe edition of his collected poetry to 1903.... Page acquired distribution rights with the stipulation that the book be sold privately, by subscription. The project failed; Carman was deeply disappointed and became disenchanted with Page, whose grip on Carman's copyrights would prevent the publication of another collected edition during Carman's lifetime."

Carman also picked up some needed cash in 1904 as editor-in-chief of the 10-volume project, The World's Best Poetry.

=== Later years ===
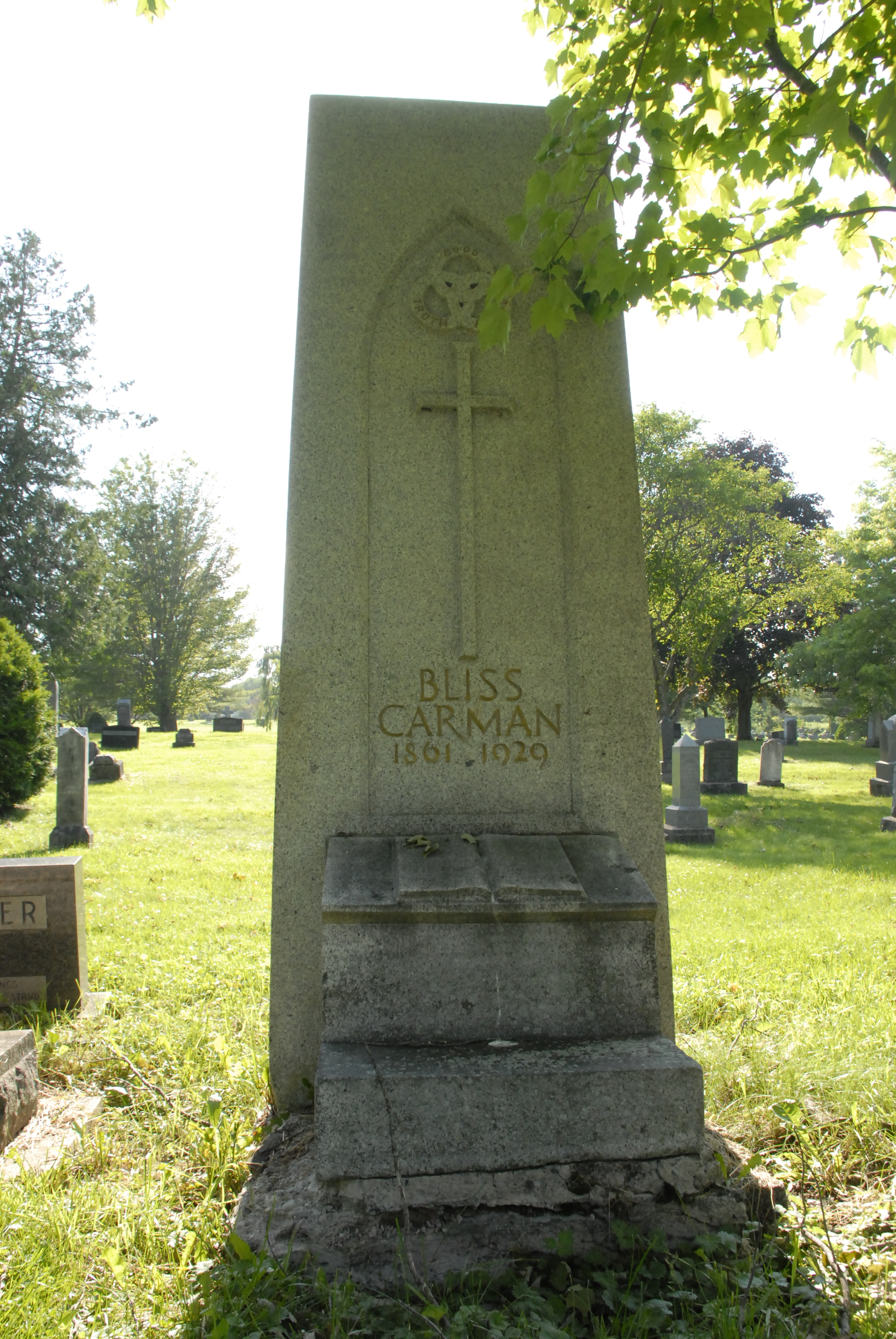
Bliss Carman Memorial, Forest Hill Cemetery, Fredericton NB

After 1908 Carman lived near the Kings' New Canaan, Connecticut, estate, "Sunshine", or in the summer in a cabin near their summer home in the Catskills, "Moonshine." Between 1908 and 1920, literary taste began to shift, and his fortunes and health declined.

By 1920, Carman was impoverished and recovering from a near-fatal attack of tuberculosis. That year he revisited Canada and "began the first of a series of successful and relatively lucrative reading tours, discovering 'there is nothing worth talking of in book sales compared with reading.'" "'Breathless attention, crowded halls, and a strange, profound enthusiasm such as I never guessed could be,' he reported to a friend. 'And good thrifty money too. Think of it! An entirely new life for me, and I am the most surprised person in Canada.'" Carman was feted at "a dinner held by the newly formed Canadian Authors' Association at the Ritz Carlton Hotel in Montreal on 28 October 1921 where he was crowned Canada's Poet Laureate with a wreath of maple leaves."

The tours of Canada continued, and by 1925 Carman had finally acquired a Canadian publisher. "McClelland & Stewart (Toronto) issued a collection of selected earlier verses and became his main publisher. They benefited from Carman's popularity and his revered position in Canadian literature, but no one could convince L.C. Page to relinquish its copyrights. An edition of collected poetry was published only after Carman's death, due greatly to the persistence of his literary executor, Lorne Pierce."

During the 1920s, Carman was a member of the Halifax literary and social set, The Song Fishermen. In 1927 he edited The Oxford Book of American Verse.

Carman died of a brain hemorrhage at the age of 68 in New Canaan, and was cremated in New Canaan. "It took two months, and the influence of New Brunswick's Premier J.B.M. Baxter and Canadian Prime Minister W.L.M. King, for Carman's ashes to be returned to Fredericton." "His ashes were buried in Forest Hill Cemetery, Fredericton, and a national memorial service was held at the Anglican cathedral there." Twenty-five years later, on May 13, 1954, a scarlet maple tree was planted at his gravesite, to grant his request in his 1892 poem "The Grave-Tree":

Let me have a scarlet maple
For the grave-tree at my head,
With the quiet sun behind it,
In the years when I am dead.

== Writing ==
=== Low Tide on Grand Pré ===
As a student at Harvard, Carman "was heavily influenced by Royce, whose spiritualistic idealism, combined with the transcendentalism of Ralph Waldo Emerson, lies centrally in the background of his first major poem, "Low Tide on Grand Pré" written in the summer and winter of 1886." "Low Tide..." was published in the Spring, 1887 Atlantic Monthly, giving Carman a literary reputation while still at Harvard. It was also included in the 1889 anthology Songs of the Great Dominion.

Literary critic Desmond Pacey considered "Low Tide..." to be "the most nearly perfect single poem to come out of Canada. It will withstand any amount of critical scrutiny."

"Low Tide..." served as the title poem for Carman's first book. "The poems in this volume have been collected with reference to their similarity of tone," Carman wrote in his preface; a nostalgic tone of pervading loss and melancholy. Three outstanding examples are "The Eavesdropper," "In Apple Time" and "Wayfaring." However, "none can equal the artistry of the title poem. What is more, although Carman would publish over thirty other volumes during his lifetime, none of them contains anything that surpasses this poem he wrote when he was barely twenty-five years old."

=== Vagabondia ===
Carman rose to prominence in the 1890s, a decade the poetry of which anthologist Louis Untermeyer has called marked by "a cheerless evasion, a humorous unconcern; its most representative craftsmen were, with four exceptions, the writers of light verse." The first two of those four exceptions were Richard Hovey and Bliss Carman. For Untermeyer: "The poetry of this period ... is dead because it detached itself from the world.... But ... revolt openly declared itself with the publication of Songs from Vagabondia (1894), More Songs from Vagabondia (1896), and Last Songs from Vagabondia (1900).... It was the heartiness, the gypsy jollity, the rush of high spirits, that conquered. Readers of the Vagabondia books were swept along by their speed faster than by their philosophy."

Even modernists loved Vagabondia. In the "October, 1912 issue of the London Poetry Review, Ezra Pound noted that he had 'greatly enjoyed The Songs of Vagabondia by Mr. Bliss Carman and the late Richard Hovey.'"

Carman's most famous poem from the first volume is arguably "The Joys of the Open Road." More Songs... contains "A Vagabond Song," once familiar to a generation of Canadians. "Canadian youngsters who were in grade seven anytime between the mid-1930s and the 1950s were probably exposed to ... 'A Vagabond Song' [which] appeared in The Canada Book of Prose and Verse, Book One, the school reader that was used in nearly every province" (and was edited by Lorne Pierce).

In 1912, Carman would publish Echoes from Vagabondia as a solo work. (Hovey had died in 1900). More of a remembrance book than part of the set, it has a distinct elegiac tone. It contains the lyric "The Flute of Spring".

=== Behind the Arras ===
With Behind the Arras (1895), Carman continued his practice of "bringing together poems that were 'in the same key.' Whereas Low Tide on Grand Pré is elegiacal and melancholy, Songs from Vagabondia is mostly light and jaunty, while Behind the Arras is philosophical and heavy."

"Behind the Arras" the poem is a long meditation that uses the speaker's house and its many rooms as a symbol of life and its choices. The poem does not succeed: "there are so many asides that the allegory is lost along with any point the poet hoped to make."

=== Ballad of Lost Haven ===
In keeping with the "same key" idea, Carman's Ballad of Lost Haven (1897) was a collection of poetry about the sea. Its notable poems include the macabre sea shanty The Gravedigger.

=== By the Aurelian Wall ===
"By the Aurelian Wall" is Carman's elegy to John Keats. It served as the title poem of his 1898 collection, a book of formal elegies.

In the last poem in the book, "The Grave-Tree," Carman writes about his own death.

=== The Pipes of Pan ===
"Pan, the goat-god, traditionally associated with poetry and with the fusion of the earthly and the divine, becomes Carman's organizing symbol in the five volumes issued between 1902 and 1905" under the above title. Under the influence of Mrs. King, Carman had begun to write in both prose and poetry about the ideas of 'unitrinianism,' "a strategy of mind-body-spirit harmonization aimed at undoing the physical, psychological, and spiritual damage caused by urban modernity ... therapeutic ideas [which] resulted in the five volumes of verse assembled in Pipes of Pan." The Dictionary of Canadian Biography (DCB) calls the series "a collection that contains many superb lyrics but, overall, evinces the dangers of a soporific aesthetic."

The 'superb lyrics' include the much-anthologized "The Dead Faun" from Volume I, From the Book of Myths; "From the Green Book of the Bards", the title poem of Volume II; "Lord of My Heart's Elation" from the same volume; and many of the erotic poems of Volume III, Songs of the Sea Children (such as LIX "I loved you when the tide of prayer"). As a whole, though, the Pan series shows (perhaps more than any other work) the truth of Northrop Frye's 1954 observation that Carman "badly needs a skillful and sympathetic selection."

=== Sappho: One Hundred Lyrics ===
First edition of Sappho, 1904.

There were no such problems with Carman's next book. Perhaps because of the underlying concept, Sappho: One Hundred Lyrics (1904) has a structure and unity that helps make it what has been called Carman's "finest volume of poetry".

Sappho was an Ancient Greek poet from the island of Lesbos, who was included in the Greek canon of nine lyric poets. Most of her poetry, which was well-known and greatly admired throughout antiquity, has been lost, but her reputation has endured, supported by the surviving fragments of some of her poems.

Carman's method, as Charles G.D. Roberts saw it in his Introduction to the book, "apparently, has been to imagine each lost lyric as discovered, and then to translate it; for the indefinable flavor of the translation is maintained throughout, though accompanied by the fluidity and freedom of purely original work". It was a daunting task, as Roberts admits: "It is as if a sculptor of to-day were to set himself, with reverence, and trained craftsmanship, and studious familiarity with the spirit, technique, and atmosphere of his subject, to restore some statues of Polyclitus or Praxiteles of which he had but a broken arm, a foot, a knee, a finger upon which to build." Yet, on the whole, Carman succeeded.

"Written more or less contemporaneously with the love poems in Songs of the Sea Children, the Sappho reconstructions continue the amorous theme from a feminine point of view. Nevertheless, the feelings ascribed to Sappho are pure Carman in their sensitive and elegiac melancholy."

Virtually all of the lyrics are of high quality; some often-quoted are XXIII ("I loved thee, Atthis, in the long ago,"), LIV ("How soon will all my lovely days be over"), LXXIV ("If death be good"), LXXXII ("Over the roofs the honey-coloured moon").

"Next to Low Tide on Grand Pré, Sappho: One Hundred Lyrics seems to be the collection that continues to find the most favour among Carman's critics. D.M.R. Bentley, for example, calls it 'undoubtedly one of the most attractive, engaging and satisfying works of any of the Confederation poets.'" Bentley argued that "the brief, crisp lyrics of the Sappho volume almost certainly contributed to the aesthetic and practice of Imagism.

=== Later work ===
In his review of 1954's Selected Poems of Bliss Carman, literary critic Northrop Frye compared Carman and the other Confederation Poets to the Group of Seven: "Like the later painters, these poets were lyrical in tone and romantic in attitude; like the painters, they sought for the most part uninhabited landscape." But Frye added: "The lyrical response to landscape is by itself, however, a kind of emotional photography, and like other forms of photography is occasional and epigrammatic.... Hence the lyric poet, after he has run his gamut of impressions, must die young, develop a more intellectualized attitude, or start repeating himself. Carman's meeting of this challenge was only partly successful."

It is true that Carman had begun to repeat himself after Sappho. "Much of Carman's writing in poetry and prose during the decade preceding World War I is as repetitive as the title of Echoes from Vagabondia (1912) intimates" says the DCB. What had made his poetry so remarkable at the beginning – that every new book was completely new – was gone.

However, Carman's career was by no means over. He "published four other collections of new poetry during his lifetime and two more were ready for publication at the time of his death: The Rough Rider, and Other Poems (1908), A Painter's Holiday, and Other Poems (1911), April Airs (1916), Far Horizons (1925), Sanctuary (1929), and Wild Garden (1929). James Cappon's comment on Far Horizons applies almost equally to the other five volumes: 'There is nothing new in its poetic quality which has the sweet sadness of age rehearsing old tunes with an art which is now very smooth though with less vivacity than it used to have.'"

Carman continued to write poems until the end of his life, such as The Old Grey Wall (April Airs), Rivers of Canada (Far Horizons), The Ghost-yard of the Goldenrod and The Ships of Saint John (Later Poems, 1926), and The Winter Scene (Sanctuary: The "Sunshine House" sonnets).

== Recognition ==
In 1906, Carman received honorary degrees from UNB and McGill University. He was elected a corresponding Fellow of the Royal Society of Canada in 1925. The Society awarded him its Lorne Pierce Gold Medal in 1928. He was awarded a medal from the American Academy of Arts and Letters in 1929.

In 1945, Carman was recognized as a Person of National Historic Significance by the government of Canada.

Carman is honored by a sculpture erected on the UNB campus in 1947, which portrays him with fellow poets Sir Charles G.D. Roberts and Francis Joseph Sherman.

Bliss Carman Middle School in Fredericton, New Brunswick and Bliss Carman Senior Public School in Toronto, Ontario were named after him.

"Bliss Carman Heights" (an extension of the Skyline Acres subdivision) is a subdivision located in Fredericton, New Brunswick overlooking the Saint John River. It consists of Essex Street, Gloucester Crescent, Reading Street, Ascot Court, and Ascot Drive. An extension of the Bliss Carman Heights subdivision is named "Poet's Hill" and consists of Bliss Carman Drive, Poets Lane and Windflower Court (named for one of Carman's poems of the same name).

In October 1916, American composer Leo Sowerby was inspired to write his best-known organ piece, "Comes Autumn Time," after reading Carman's poem, "Autumn," in the Literature section of the Sunday Edition of the Chicago Tribune on October 16 of that year. "Autumn" was reprinted from The Atlantic on page 6 of the Chicago Daily Tribune on October 5, 1916.

Theodora Thayer's "fine portrait of Bliss Carman is considered one of the memorable achievements in American miniature painting."

== Publications ==
=== Poetry collections ===
- Low Tide on Grand Pre: A Book Of Lyrics. New York: Charles L. Webster. 1893. Archived from the original on March 4, 2016. - Low Tide on Grand Pré: A Book of Lyrics at Google Books
- Carman, Bliss; Hovey, Richard (1894). Songs From Vagabondia. Illustrated by Tom B. Meteyard. Boston: Copeland & Day. Archived from the original on March 4, 2016. - Songs from Vagabondia at Google Books - A Vagabondia Songs (2013 Reprint) at Google Books
- A Seamark: A Threnody for Robert Louis Stevenson. Boston: Copeland & Day. 1895. - A Seamark: A Threnody for Robert Louis Stevenson at Google Books
- Carman, Bliss (1895). Behind The Arras: A Book Of The Unseen. With designs by Tom B. Meteyard. Boston: Lamson, Wolffe. Archived from the original on June 12, 2016.
- Ballads of Lost Haven: A Book Of The Sea. Boston: Lamson, Wolffe. 1897. Archived from the original on March 4, 2016.
- By The Aurelian Wall: And Other Elegies. Boston: Lamson, Wolffe. 1898. Archived from the original on March 4, 2016.
- Carman, Bliss; Hovey, Richard (1896). More Songs From Vagabondia. Illustrated by Tom B. Meteyard. Boston: Copeland & Day. Archived from the original on March 4, 2016. - More Songs from Vagabondia at Google Books - A Vagabondia Songs (2013 Reprint) at Google Books
- A Winter Holiday. Boston: Small, Maynard. 1899. Archived from the original on March 4, 2016.
- Carman, Bliss; Hovey, Richard (1901). Last Songs From Vagabondia. Illustrated by Tom B. Meteyard. Boston: Small, Maynard. Archived from the original on March 4, 2016. - Last Songs from Vagabondia at Google Books - A Vagabondia Songs (2013 Reprint) at Google Books
- Ballads and Lyrics. London: A.H. Bullen. 1902.
- Ode on the Coronation of King Edward. Boston: L.C. Page. 1902.
- Pipes Of Pan: From the Book of Myths. Boston: L.C. Page. 1902. Archived from the original on March 4, 2016. - Pipes Of Pan: From the Book of Myths at Google Books
- Pipes Of Pan: From the Green Book of the Bards. Boston: L.C. Page. 1903. Archived from the original on March 4, 2016. - Pipes Of Pan: From the Green Book of the Bards at Google Books
- Pipes Of Pan: Songs of the Sea Children. Boston: L.C. Page. 1904. Archived from the original on March 4, 2016. - Pipes Of Pan: Songs of the Sea Children at Google Books
- Pipes Of Pan: Songs From a Northern Garden. Boston: L.C. Page. 1904. Archived from the original on March 4, 2016. - Pipes Of Pan: Songs From a Northern Garden at Google Books
- Pipes Of Pan: From the Book of Valentines. Boston: L.C. Page. 1905. Archived from the original on June 12, 2016. - Pipes Of Pan: From the Book of Valentines at Google Books
- Carman, Bliss (1904). Sappho: One Hundred Lyrics. Intro. by Charles G.D. Roberts. Boston: L.C. Page. Archived from the original on September 25, 2015.
- Poems. (London: Chiswick P, 1905).
- The Rough Rider: And Other Poems. New York: M. Kennerley. 1909. Archived from the original on June 12, 2016.
- A Painter's Holiday, and Other Poems. New York: F.F. Sherman. 1911.
- Echoes From Vagabondia. Boston: Small, Maynard. 1912. Archived from the original on March 4, 2016.
- April Airs: A Book Of New England Lyrics. Boston: Small, Maynard. 1916. Archived from the original on March 4, 2016.
- Carman, Bliss; King, Mary Perry (1918). The Man of The Marne: And Other Poems. New Canaan, Connecticut: Ponus Press.
- The Vengeance of Noel Brassard: A Tale of the Acadian Expulsion (PDF). Cambridge, Massachusetts: The University Press. 1919.
- Far Horizons. Boston: Small, Maynard and Company. 1925. Archived from the original on March 4, 2016. - Far Horizons at Google Books
- Later Poems. Toronto: McClelland & Steward. 1926. Archived from the original on December 3, 2015.
- Carman, Bliss (1929). Sanctuary: Sunshine House Sonnets. Illustrated by Whitman Bailey. Toronto: McClelland & Steward. Archived from the original on March 4, 2016.
- Wild Garden. Toronto: McClelland & Steward. 1929. Archived from the original on March 4, 2016.
- Bliss Carman's Poems. New York: Dodd, Mead. 1931. - Bliss Carman's Poems at Google Books
- Pierce, Lorne, ed. (1954). The Selected Poems Of Bliss Carman. Toronto: McClelland & Stewart.
- A Vision Of Sappho. Toronto: Canadiana House. 1968.
- The Poems of Bliss Carman. Toronto: McClelland & Stewart. 1976. ISBN 978-0-7710-9509-2.
- Souster, Raymond; Lochhead, Douglas, eds. (1985). Windflower: Poems Of Bliss Carman. Ottawa: Tecumseh. ISBN 978-0-919662-07-0.

=== Drama ===
- Bliss Carman and Mary Perry King. Daughters of Dawn: A Lyrical Pageant of Series of Historical Scenes for Presentation With Music and Dancing. (New York: M. Kennerley, 1913).
- Bliss Carman and Mary Perry King. Earth Deities: And Other Rhythmic Masques. (New York: M. Kennerley, 1914).

=== Prose collections ===
- The Kinship Of Nature. Boston: L. C. Page. 1904.
- The Poetry Of Life. Boston: L. C. Page. 1905. - The poetry of life (1906 ed.) at Google Books
- The Friendship of Art. Boston: L. C. Page. 1908. - Carman, Bliss (February 18, 2015). The Friendship of Art (Scholar's Choice ed.). Scholar's Choice. ISBN 978-1-2981-9930-0.
- The Making of Personality. Boston: L. C. Page. 1908. - The Making of Personality at Google Books
- Carman, Bliss (1926). Talks on Poetry and Life; Being a Series of Five Lectures Delivered Before the University of Toronto, December 1925 (Speech). Transcribed by Blanche Hume.
- Pierce, Lorne, ed. (1931). Bliss Carman's Scrap-Book: A Table Of Contents. Toronto: Ryerson.
- Gundy, H. Pearson, ed. (1982). Letters of Bliss Carman. Kingston, Ontario: McGill-Queen's University Press. ISBN 9780773503649.

=== Edited ===
- The World's Best Poetry (10 volumes). New York: The University Society. 1904. - The World's best poetry, Volume 1 at Google Books
- The Oxford Book of American Verse (U.S. ed.). New York: Albert & Charles Boni. 1927.
- Carman, Bliss; Pierce, Lorne, eds. (1935). Our Canadian Literature: Representative Verse, English and French. Toronto: Ryerson.

=== Archive ===
- Bliss Carman Papers, 1889–1927 (2 linear ft.) are housed in the Department of Special Collections and University Archives at Stanford University Libraries

== See also ==
- Canadian literature
- Canadian poetry
- List of Canadian poets

== Sources ==
- "Bliss Carman's Letters To Margaret Lawrence, 1927-1929". Post-Confederation Poetry: Texts And Contexts. Ed. D.M.R. Bentley. London: Canadian Poetry P, 1995.
- Bliss Carman : A Reappraisal. Ed. Gerald Lynch. Ottawa: University of Ottawa Press, 1990.
- Letters of Bliss Carman. Ed. H. Pearson Gundy. Kingston: McGill-Queen's University Press, 1981.
- Hugh McPherson. The Literary Reputation Of Bliss Carman : A Study In The Development Of Canadian Taste In Poetry. 1950.
- Muriel Miller. Bliss Carman, A Portrait. Toronto: Ryerson, 1935.
- Muriel Miller. Bliss Carman : Quest And Revolt. St. John's, Nfld.: Jesperson P, 1985.
- Donald G Stephens. Bliss Carman. 1966.
- Donald G. Stephens. The Influence Of English Poets Upon The Poetry Of Bliss Carman. 1955.
- Margaret A. Stewart. Bliss Carman : Poet, Philosopher, Teacher. 1976.
