= Annie Campbell Huestis =

Canadian poet (1876–1960)

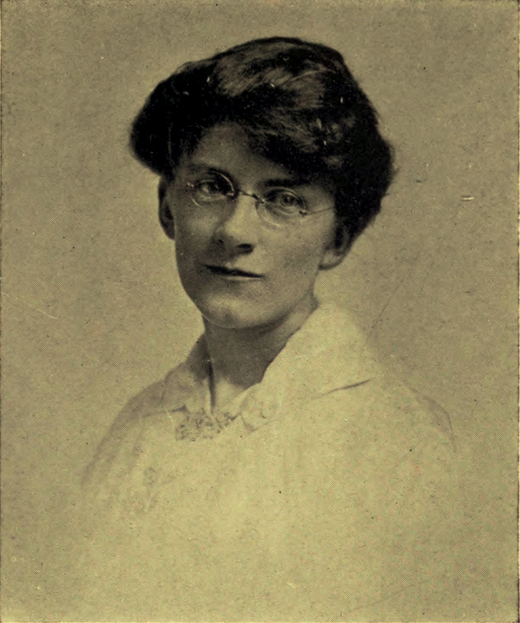
Annie Campbell Huestis in Canadian Poets, 1916

Annie Campbell Huestis was a Canadian poet. She was born in Halifax, Nova Scotia, in 1876. She was the daughter of Martin Bent Huestis and Victoire Marie Ayrton Johnson, a sister of the Dominion Statistician George Johnson. She was educated at the Sacred Heart Convent in Halifax. Her work appeared in the New York Independent, Harper's Magazine, and elsewhere. Among those who championed her work were Edward William Thomson and the Confederation Poet Sir Charles G. D. Roberts. She died in 1960.

== See also ==
- Canadian poetry
