= Helena Coleman =

Canadian poet, music teacher, and writer

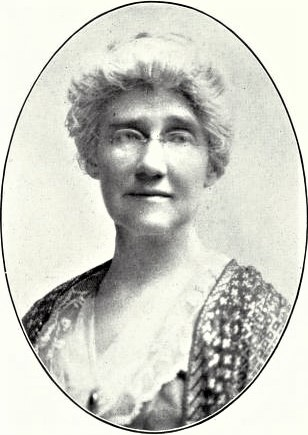
- Helena Coleman, from a 1919 publication.
- Born: Helena Jane Coleman; April 27, 1860; Newcastle, Ontario, Canada
- Died: December 7, 1953 (aged 93); Toronto, Ontario, Canada
- Occupations: Poet, music teacher, writer

Signature
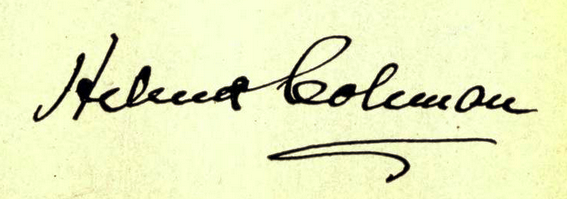

Helena Coleman (April 27, 1860 – December 7, 1953) was a Canadian poet, music teacher, and writer.

== Early life ==
Helena Jane Coleman was born on April 27, 1860 in Newcastle, Ontario, to the Rev. Francis Coleman, a Methodist minister, and his second wife, English-born Jane C. Gould.

Helena Coleman's father's first wife, Emmeline Maria Adams Coleman, died on June 23, 1858, two years before Helena was born. Helena had five older half-brothers. Emmeline (and Helena's half-siblings) were descendants of John Quincy Adams. Emmeline was also the sister of educator Mary Electa Adams.) Some sources incorrectly ascribe Helena to the Adams genealogical line with her half-siblings.

Helena Coleman attended Ontario Ladies' College in Whitby, Ontario, with further study in Germany.

== Career ==
Coleman taught piano at Ontario Ladies' College from 1880 to 1892, as head of the music department, while her brothers' aunt Mary Electa Adams was the principal. There she was a friend and colleague of Margaret Addison, who became a dean of the school. Coleman was also a friend of New Zealand writer Edith Joan Lyttelton, during her stays in Canada. Coleman was a mentor to Canadian poet Marjorie Pickthall. Her friendship with fellow Canadian poet Ethelwyn Wetherald was especially intimate.

Coleman's poems appeared under dozens of pseudonyms (using masculine, feminine, and indeterminate names) in many Canadian and American magazines, including Atlantic Monthly, Collier's, and Ladies' Home Journal, until 1906, when she published Songs and Sonnets (1906) under her own name, by the Tennyson Club of Toronto. Further poetry collections were Marching Men: War Verses (1917) and Songs (1937). Her stories and articles continued to appear under various pseudonyms. Another book by her, Sheila and Others (1920), was a collection of short stories and bore the byline "Winifred Cotter". She was a member of the Canadian Authors Association, and of the University Women's Club of Toronto.

== Personal life ==
Helena Coleman used crutches that she called her "helpers", after surviving polio in childhood. After 1928 she used a wheelchair. Coleman lived most of her life in Toronto with her brother Arthur, and with a niece, Helen Coleman. She died in 1953, aged 93 years, in Toronto. Her papers are archived in the E. J. Pratt Library at Victoria University.
