= Charles G. D. Roberts =

Canadian poet and prose writer (1860–1943)

Sir Charles G. D. Roberts KCMG FRSC
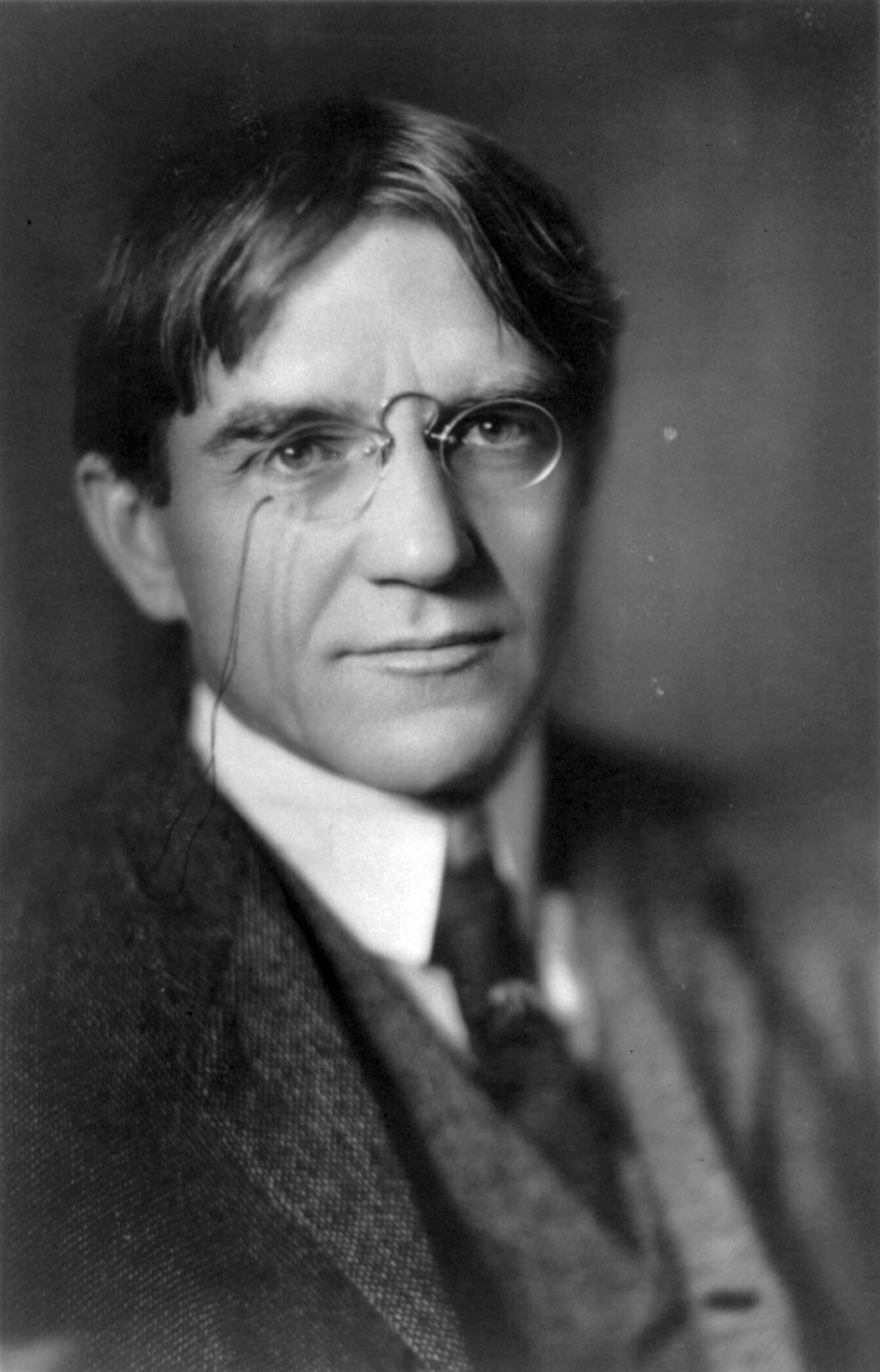
- Roberts in 1904
- Born: Charles George Douglas Roberts; 10 January 1860; Douglas, New Brunswick
- Died: 26 November 1943 (aged 83); Toronto, Ontario
- Citizenship: British subject
- Spouse(s): Mary Fenety, Joan Montgomery
- Writing career
- Language: English
- Genre: Poetry
- Notable works: Songs of the Common Day, The Book of the Rose, The Iceberg and other poems
- Notable awards: Knighthood (KCMG), FRSC, Lorne Pierce Medal
- Literary movement: Confederation Poets, The Song Fishermen

Sir Charles George Douglas Roberts KCMG FRSC (January 10, 1860 – November 26, 1943) was a Canadian poet and prose writer. He was one of the first Canadian authors to be internationally known. He published various works on Canadian exploration and natural history, verse, travel books, and fiction." He continued to be a well-known "man of letters" until his death.

Besides his own body of work, Roberts has also been called the "Father of Canadian Poetry" because he served as an inspiration and a source of assistance for other Canadian poets of his time.

Roberts, his cousin Bliss Carman, Archibald Lampman and Duncan Campbell Scott are known as the Confederation Poets. He also inspired a whole nationalist school of late 19th-century poets.

== Early life and education ==
Roberts was born in Douglas, New Brunswick, in 1860, the eldest child of Emma Wetmore Bliss and Rev. George Goodridge Roberts (an Anglican priest). Rev. Roberts was rector of Fredericton and canon of Christ Church Cathedral, New Brunswick. Charles's brother Theodore Goodridge Roberts and sister, Elizabeth Roberts MacDonald, also became authors.

Between the ages of 8 months and 14 years, Roberts was raised in the parish of Westcock, New Brunswick, near Sackville, by the Tantramar Marshes. He was homeschooled, mostly by his father, who was educated in Greek, Latin and French. He published his first writing, three articles in The Colonial Farmer, at 12 years of age.

After the family moved to Fredericton in 1873, Roberts attended Fredericton Collegiate School from 1874 to 1876, and then the University of New Brunswick (UNB), earning his B.A. in 1879 and M.A. in 1881. At the Collegiate School he came under the influence of headmaster George Robert Parkin, who gave him a love of classical literature and introduced him to the poetry of Dante Gabriel Rossetti and Algernon Charles Swinburne.

=== Early Canadian career ===
Roberts worked as principal of Chatham High School in Chatham, New Brunswick, from 1879 to 1881, and of York Street School in Fredericton from 1881 to 1883. In Chatham he met and befriended Edmund Collins, editor of the Chatham Star and the future biographer of Sir John A. Macdonald.

Roberts first published poetry in the Canadian Illustrated News of March 30, 1878, and by 1879 he had placed two poems in the American magazine, Scribner's.

In 1880, Roberts published his first book of poetry, Orion and Other Poems. Thanks in part to his industry in sending out complimentary review copies, there were many positive reviews, including praise from Rose-Belford's Canadian Monthly and several American periodicals, including the New York Independent, which called it 'a little book of choice things, with the indifferent things well weeded out.'"

On December 29, 1880, Roberts married Mary Fenety, and they had five children.

The biography by Roberts's friend Edmund Collins, The Life and Times of Sir John A. Macdonald, was published in 1883. The book was a success, going through eight printings. It contained a chapter on "Thought and Literature in Canada," which devoted 15 pages to Roberts, quoting from Orion. Collins' characterization of Roberts as "our greatest Canadian poet" helped develop Roberts' reputation as a prominent Canadian writer.

From 1883 to 1884, Roberts was in Toronto, Ontario, working as the editor of Goldwin Smith's short-lived literary magazine, The Week. After five months of long hours and disagreements with Smith, Roberts resigned. (Note: Roberts is listed as editor from Volume 1, Issue 1 (December 6, 1883) to Volume 1, Issue 12 (February 6, 1884))

In 1885, Roberts became a professor at the University of King's College in Windsor, Nova Scotia. In 1886, his second book, In Divers Tones, was published by a Boston publisher. During the following six years, Roberts wrote articles on a variety of subjects, mentored not-yet-recognized poets such as Annie Campbell Huestis, and lectured in a number of cities in Canada and the United States. He published about thirty poems in The Independent (edited by Bliss Carman) and other American periodicals, as well as stories for young readers in The Youth's Companion. He also edited a poetry collection, Poems of Wild Life in 1888, and created the Canadian Guide Book in 1891.

The 1889 anthology Songs of the Great Dominion, edited by W.D. Lighthall, included a selection of Roberts's work.

In 1890, he translated from French to English for D. Appleton and Company a French Canadian bestseller, Les Anciens Canadiens (1863) by Philippe Aubert de Gaspé, as The Canadians of Old (1890; new edition Cameron of Lochiel, 1905).

Roberts resigned from King's College in 1895, when his request for a leave of absence was turned down. In a short period of time he had published his first novel, The Forge in the Forest, as well as a fourth collection of poetry, The Book of the Native. He also wrote a book of nature-stories, Earth's Enigmas, and completed a book of boys' adventure stories Around the Campfire.

=== Move to New York ===
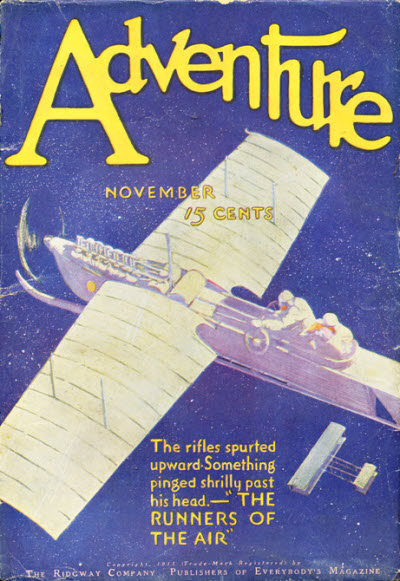
Roberts's "Runners of the Air" was the cover story for the November 1911 issue of Adventure.

In 1897, Roberts left his wife and children in Canada and moved to New York City to work free-lance. Between 1897 and 1898, he worked for The Illustrated American as an associate editor.

In New York, Roberts wrote prose in many genres, but had most success with animal stories, drawing upon his early experience in the wilds of the Maritimes. He published about a dozen volumes of these, beginning with Earth's Enigmas in 1896 and ending with Eyes of the Wilderness in 1933.

Roberts also wrote historical romances and novels. Barbara Ladd (1902) is the story of a young girl who runs away from her aunt in New England in 1769; it sold 80,000 copies in the US. He also wrote descriptive text for guide books, such as Picturesque Canada and The Land of Evangeline and Gateways Thither for Nova Scotia's Dominion Atlantic Railway.

Roberts became involved in a literary debate known as the nature fakers controversy after John Burroughs denounced his popular animal stories, and those of other writers, in a 1903 article for Atlantic Monthly. The controversy lasted for nearly six years and included American environmental and political figures of the day, including President Theodore Roosevelt.

=== Europe and return to Canada ===
In 1907, Roberts moved to Europe. First living in Paris, he moved to Munich in 1910, and in 1912 to London, where he lived until 1925. During his stay in London, Roberts wrote a series of short stories about dinosaurs and prehistoric humans. These stories were later collected as the 1919 book In the Morning of Time. In Britain he became a member of Legion of Frontiersmen. During World War I he enlisted with the British Army as a trooper, eventually becoming a captain and a cadet trainer in England. After the war he joined the Canadian War Records Office in London.

Roberts returned to Canada in 1925 and began once more to write poetry." During the late 1920s he was a member of the Halifax literary and social set, The Song Fishermen.

He married his second wife Joan Montgomery on October 28, 1943, at the age of 83, but became ill and died shortly thereafter in Toronto. The funeral was held in Toronto; his ashes were interred in Forest Hill Cemetery, Fredericton.

== Poetry ==
=== Early work ===
Roberts's first book, Orion and Other Poems (1880), was a collection of poetry written in his teen years. It was a vanity book; he paid an advance of $300 to have it published, borrowing money from George E. Fenety, the Queen's Printer for New Brunswick, and his father-in-law-to-be. Much later, in 1958, the critic Desmond Pacey deemed it a "remarkable performance" considering the age of the writer. Editor Ross Kilpatrick called the poems "imitative, naively romantic, defective in diction", but also "facile, clever, and occasionally distinctly beautiful".

Roberts' second book, In Divers Tones is filled with selections which vary in quality, style and subject. Those written after 1883 demonstrated developing skill, and three in particular, 'The Tantramar Revisited,' 'The Sower,' and 'The Potato Harvest, were considered superior.

By the time of Songs of the Common Day, and Ave! (1893), Roberts poetic style was well developed. The sonnet sequence of Songs of the Common Day drew attention from critics; some colourfully described landscapes in Tantramar (lines such as "How sombre slope these acres to the sea' ('The Furrow"), 'These marshes pale and meadows by the sea' ('The Salt Flats'), and 'My fields of Tantramar in summer-time' ('The Pea-Fields')).

=== Middle period ===
After Roberts turned to free-lance writing in 1895, he began concentrating on writing fiction in order to support himself. He published two more books of poetry by 1898, but managed only two more in the following 30 years.

His 1897 book of seasonal poems in The Book of the Native was a collection of works designed to appeal to monthly magazines: 'The Brook in February,' 'An April Adoration,' 'July,' and 'An August Woodroad.' Some of the poems demonstrated Roberts' skill at colourful depictions of nature through Romantic verse; however, the book also included examples of a shift toward a more mystical style.

Roberts's 1898 book New York Nocturnes and Other Poems was filled mainly with poetry written before his move to New York. Written during a difficult time in his life, much of the work is unremarkable. The poem 'The Solitary Woodsman,' was later included in a number of anthologies. His poems about New York focus less on descriptions of visual interest and more on urban problems such as noise, fumes and crowding.

The first and title section of The Book of the Rose (1903) was a collection of love poetry of varying effectiveness. Among the poems in the second section, "Heat in the City," about the distress and despair of the tenement-dwellers, has been praised as "the best poem he ever wrote about city life". Also notable is the introspective final poem in the book, "The Aim."

"New Poems, a slim volume published in 1919, shows the drop in both the quantity and quality of Roberts' poetry during his European years. At least half of the pieces had been written before he left America, some as early as 1903."

=== Later poems ===
Roberts's "return to Canada in 1925 led to a renewed production of verse with The Vagrant of Time (1927) and The Iceberg and Other Poems (1934)." Literary critic Desmond Pacey calls this period "the Indian summer of his poetic career".

"Among the best of the new poems" in The Vagrant of Time "is the one with this inspired opening line: 'Spring breaks in foam along the blackthorn bough.' In another love poem, 'In the Night Watches,' written in 1926, his command of free verse is natural and unstrained, unlike the laboured language and forced rhymes of his earlier love poetry. Its synthesis of lonely wilderness setting with feelings of separation and longing is harmonious and poignant."

"Most critics rank "The Iceberg" (265 lines), the title poem of the new collection" published in 1934, "as one of Roberts' outstanding achievements. It is almost as ambitious as 'Ave!' in conception; its cold, unemotional images are as apt and precise in their detached way as the warmly-remembered descriptions in 'Tantramar Revisited.'

== Animal stories ==
The Canadian Encyclopedia says that "Roberts is remembered for creating in the animal story, along with Ernest Thompson Seton, the one native Canadian art form." A typical Roberts animal story is "The Truce". Many of Roberts' stories are told from the point of view of the animals themselves.

In his introduction to The Kindred of the Wild (1902), Roberts called the animal story "a potent emancipator. It frees us for a little from the world of shop-worn utilities, and from the mean tenement of self of which we do well to grow weary. It helps us to return to nature, without requiring that we at the same time return to barbarism. It leads us back to the old kinship of earth, without asking us to relinquish by way of toll any part of the wisdom of the ages, any fine essential of the 'large result of time.' (Kindred 28)"

Critics began to take interest in Roberts's animal stories in the 1960s and 70s. Some critics saw the animal stories as an allegory for Canadian nationhood, seeing in Seton's and Roberts' depictions of the brutal lives of animals a reflection of Canada's fate in dealing with the United States.

Margaret Atwood devotes a chapter of her 1971 critical study Survival: A Thematic Guide to Canadian Literature to animal stories, where she states the same thesis: "the stories are told from the point of view of the animal. That's the key: English animal stories are about the 'social relations,' American ones are about people killing animals; Canadian ones are about animals being killed, as felt emotionally from inside the fur and feathers. (qtd. in Sandlos 74; emphasis in original)."

== Recognition ==
Charles G. D Roberts was elected a Fellow of the Royal Society of Canada in 1893.

Roberts was elected to the United States National Institute of Arts and Letters in 1898.

He was awarded an honorary LLD from UNB in 1906, and an honorary doctorate from Mount Allison University in 1942.

For his contributions to Canadian literature, Roberts was awarded the Royal Society of Canada's first Lorne Pierce Medal in 1926.

On June 3, 1935, Roberts was one of three Canadians on King George V's honour list to receive a knighthood (Knight Commander of the Order of St. Michael and St. George).

Roberts was honoured by a sculpture erected in 1947 on the UNB campus, portraying him with Bliss Carman and fellow poet Francis Joseph Sherman.

The 1980s were a period of renewed interest in Roberts' work: a number of monographs were written; a book containing all his poems, a biography, and a collection of his letters were published. Mount Allison University hosted a Roberts Symposium in 1982, as did the University of Ottawa in 1983. There were several new studies of his poetry.

Roberts was declared a Person of National Historic Significance in 1945, and a monument to him was erected by the Historic Sites and Monuments Board of Canada in Westcock in 2005.

His alma mater, the University of New Brunswick, offers a "Charles G.D. Roberts Memorial Prize" for best short story by an undergraduate.

Roberts' poem "The Maple" was set to music by composer Garrett Krause, and performed in 2018 as part of the Luminous Voices concert in Calgary.

== Publications ==
=== Poetry ===
- Orion, and Other Poems. Philadelphia, Pennsylvania: J. B. Lippincott & Co. 1880.; also: "Orion, and Other Poems". Canadian Poetry Press. Archived from the original on 23 July 2011.; Orion, and Other Poems at Google Books
- In Divers Tones. Boston, Massachusetts: D. Lothrop and Company. 1886.; also: "In Divers Tones". Canadian Poetry Press. Archived from the original on 23 July 2011.; In Divers Tones at Google Books
- AVE! An Ode for the Shelley Centenary. Toronto: Williamson, 1892.
- Songs of the Common Day and, AVE! An Ode for the Shelley Centenary. Toronto, Ontario: William Briggs. 1893. Archived from the original on 23 July 2011.; Songs of the Common Day and, AVE! An Ode for the Shelley Centenary at Google Books
- The Book of the Native. Toronto, Ontario: Copp Clark. 1896. Archived from the original on 23 July 2011.
- New York Nocturnes and Other Poems. Boston, Massachusetts: Lamson Wolffe. 1898. Archived from the original on 23 July 2011.
- Poems. New York: Silver, Burdett, 1901.
- The Book of the Rose. Boston, Massachusetts: L. C. Page & Company. 1903. Archived from the original on 23 July 2011.; The Book of the Rose at Google Books
- New Poems. London: Constable. 1919. Archived from the original on 23 July 2011.
- The Sweet o' the Year and Other Poems. Toronto, Ontario: Ryerson. 1925. Archived from the original on 23 July 2011.; The Sweet o' the Year and Other Poems at Google Books
- The Vagrant of Time. Toronto, Ontario: Ryerson. 1927. Archived from the original on 23 July 2011.; The Vagrant of Time at Google Books
- The Iceberg and Other Poems Selected Poems of Sir Charles G.D. Roberts. 1934. Archived from the original on 23 July 2011.
- Selected Poems of Sir Charles G.D. Roberts. Toronto, Ontario: Ryerson. 1936.
- Flying Colours. Miami, Florida: Granger Books. 1942.
- Pacey, Desmond, ed. (1955). The Selected Poems of Charles G.D. Roberts. Toronto, Ontario: Ryerson.
- Keith, W.J., ed. (1974). Selected Poetry and Critical Prose. Toronto, Ontario: University of Toronto Press.
- Pacey, Desmond; Adams, Graham, eds. (1985). Collected Poems of Sir Charles G.D. Roberts. Wolfville, Nova Scotia: Wombat Press.

=== Fiction ===
- The Raid from Beauséjour and How the Carter Boys Lifted the Mortgage. New York: Hunt & Eaton. 1894.; The Raid from Beausejour and How the Carter Boys Lifted the Mortgage at Google Books
- Reube Dare's Shad Boat: A Tale of the Tide Country. New York: Hunt & Eaton. 1895.; Reube Dare's Shad Boat - A Tale of the Tide Country at Google Books
- Around the Campfire. Toronto: Musson Book Co. 1896.
- Earth's Enigmas. Boston: Lamson, Wolffe. 1896. Archived from the original on 7 May 2012.; Earth's Enigmas: A Volume of Stories at Google Books
- The Forge in the Forest. Boston: Lamson, Wolffe. 1896.
- By the Marshes of Minas. Boston: Silver, Burdett and Company. 1900.
- A Sister to Evangeline. Boston: Silver, Burdett and Company. 1900.
- The Feet of the Furtive. London: Ward, Lock & Co. 1900.
- The Heart of the Ancient Wood. Boston: L. C. Page & Company. 1902.
- The Haunters of the Silences: A Book of Animal Life. London: Thomas Nelson. 1900.
- Barbara Ladd. Boston: The Page Company. 1902.
- The Kindred of the Wild. Boston: The Page Company. 1902. Archived from the original on 23 July 2011.; The Kindred of the Wild: A Book of Animal Life at Google Books
- The Prisoner of Mademoiselle: A Love Story. Boston: L.C. Page. 1904.
- The Watchers of the Trails. Toronto: Copp Clark. 1904. (Illustrated by Julek Heller in 1976)
- Red Fox. Boston: L. C. Page & Company. 1905.
- The Watchers of the Campfire. Boston: L.C. Page & Company. 1906.
- The Heart That Knows. Boston: L.C. Page & Company. 1906.
- The Cruise of the Yacht "Dido": A Tale of the Tide Country. Boston: L.C. Page & Company. 1906.
- The Little People of the Sycamore. Charles Livingston Bull illus. Boston: L.C. Page & Company. 1906.
- The Return to the Trails. Charles Livingston Bull illus. Boston: L.C. Page & Company. 1906.
- In the Deep of the Snow. New York: T.Y. Crowell. 1907.
- The Young Acadian Boston. Boston: L.C. Page & Company. 1907.
- The Haunters of the Silences. Boston: L.C. Page & Company. 1907.
- The House in the Water. Boston: L.C. Page & Company. 1908.
- The Backwoodsmen. New York: Macmillan. 1909.
- Kings in Exile. New York: Macmillan. 1910.
- Neighbours Unknown. London: Ward, Lock & Co. 1910.
- More Kindred of the Wild. London: Ward, Lock & Co. 1911.
- Babes of the Wild. Warwick Reynolds, illus. London: Cassell. 1912.
- Children of the Wild. Paul Bramson, illus. New York: Macmillan. 1913.
- A Balkan Prince. London: Everett & Co. 1913.
- Hoof and Claw (reprint ed.). New York: Macmillan. 1920 [1914].
- The Secret Trails. New York: Macmillan. 1916.
- The Ledge on Bald Face. London: Ward, Lock, & Co. 1918.
- In the Morning of Time. London: Hutchinson & Co. 1919. LCCN 20000098. (digital copy at HathiTrust) – 1912 magazine stories, extended; with eight illustrations by seven artists
- Some Animal Stories. Dent. 1921.
- More Animal Stories. Dent. 1922.
- Wisdom of the Wilderness. Read Books. 1923. ISBN 978-1-4733-0956-2.
- They Who Walk in the Wilds. Read Books. 1924. ISBN 978-1-4733-1140-4.
- Eyes of the Wilderness. New York: Macmillan. 1933.
- Further Animal Stories. Dent. 1935.
- The Last Barrier and Other Stories. Toronto: McClelland & Stewart. 1970.
- Ware, Martin, ed. (1992). The Vagrants of the Barren and Other Stories of Charles G.D. Roberts. Ottawa, Ontario: Tecumseh. ISBN 978-0-9196-6235-3.

=== Non-fiction ===
- The Canadians of Old. New York: D. Appleton and Company. 1890.; reed. Cameron of Lochiel. Boston: L. C. Page & Company. 1905. (English translation of Les Anciens Canadiens (1863) by Philippe-Joseph Aubert de Gaspé)
- The Canadian Guide-Book: The Tourist's and Sportsman's Guide to Eastern Canada and Newfoundland. New York: D. Appleton 1891.
- A History of Canada. Boston, Massachusetts: The Page Company. 1897.
- Discoveries and Explorations in the Century. London: Linscott. 1906.
- Canada in Flanders (1918) – non-fiction

=== Edited ===
- Poems of Wild Life. London: W. Scott, 1888.
- Canada Speaks of Britain and Other Poems of the War. Toronto: Ryerson, 1941.

=== Papers ===
- Sir Charles G. D. Roberts papers. Charles George Douglas Roberts; Linda Dumbleton; Rose Mary Gibson. Kingston : Queen's University Archives, {c.1983}.
- The Collected Letters of Sir Charles G.D. Roberts. Fredericton, NB: Goose Lane, 1989.

== See also ==
- Canadian literature
- Canadian poetry
- List of Canadian poets
- William Harris Lloyd Roberts
