= Confederation Poets =

Cohort of Canadian poets

Confederation Poets is the name given to a group of Canadian poets born in the decade of Canada's Confederation (the 1860s) who rose to prominence in Canada in the late 1880s and 1890s. The term was coined by Canadian professor and literary critic Malcolm Ross, who applied it to four poets – Charles G.D. Roberts (1860–1943), Bliss Carman (1861–1929), Archibald Lampman (1861–1899), and Duncan Campbell Scott (1862–1947) – in the Introduction to his 1960 anthology, Poets of the Confederation. He wrote, "It is fair enough, I think, to call Roberts, Carman, Lampman, and Scott our 'Confederation poets.'"

The term has also been used since to include William Wilfred Campbell (?1860-1918) and Frederick George Scott (1861–1944), sometimes Francis Joseph Sherman (1871–1926), sometimes Pauline Johnson (1861–1913) and George Frederick Cameron (1854–1885), and Isabella Valancy Crawford (1850–1887) as well.

== History ==
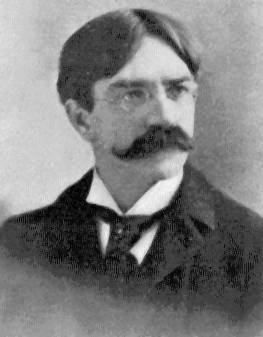
Sir Charles G.D. Roberts

The Confederation Poets were the first Canadian writers to become widely known after Confederation in 1867.

Charles G. D. Roberts (recognized in his lifetime as "the father of Canadian poetry") led the group, which had two main branches: One, in Ottawa, consisted of the poets Archibald Lampman, Duncan Campbell Scott, and William Wilfred Campbell. The other were Maritime poets, including Roberts and his cousin, Bliss Carman. The four major poets in the group were Roberts, Carman, Lampman and Scott, with Lampman "most often regarded as the finest poet" among them, according to the Twentieth-Century Literary Movements Dictionary.

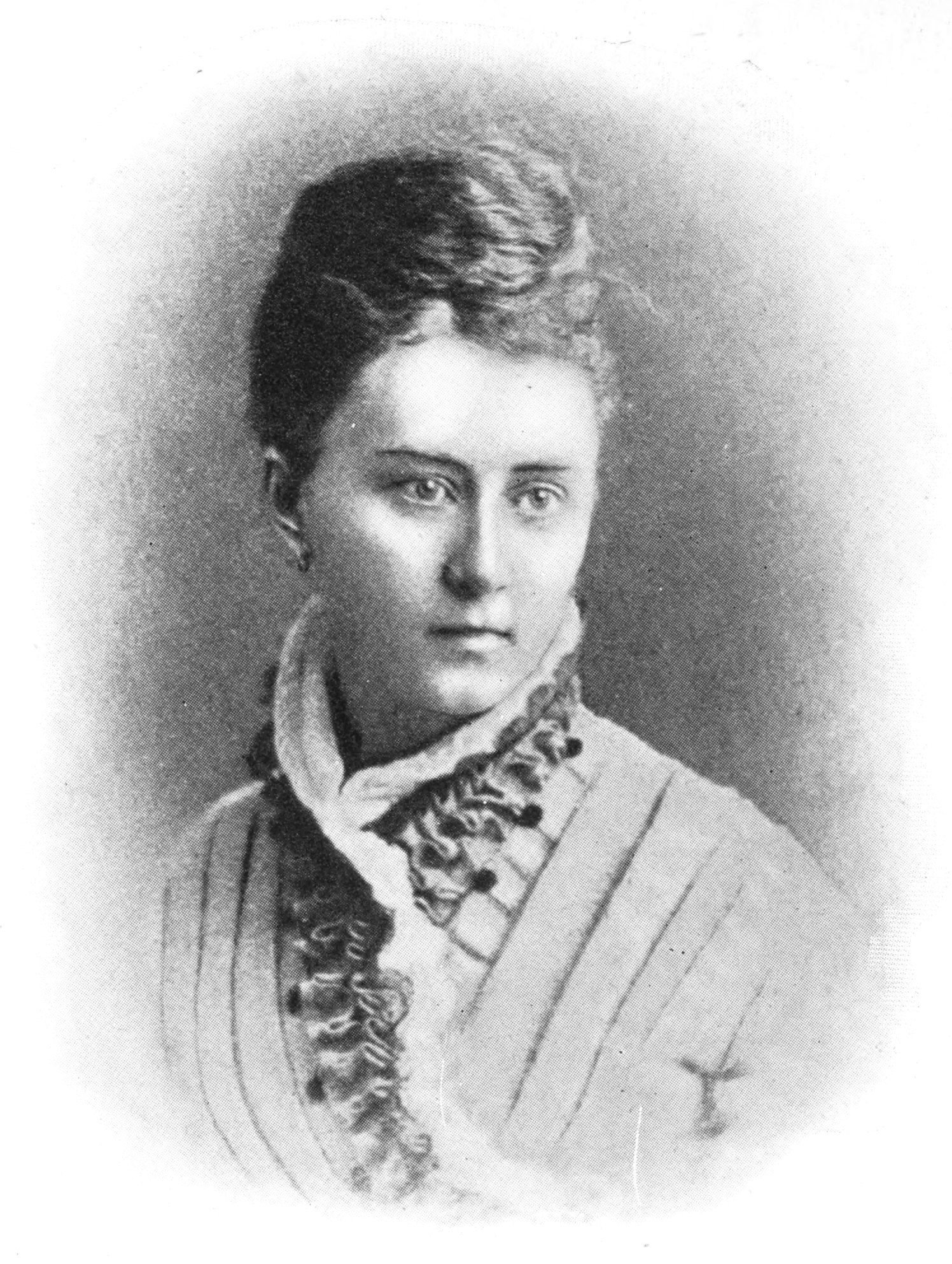
Isabella Valancy Crawford, c.1919

The group, which thrived from the 1890s to the 1920s, generally paid attention to classical forms and subjects, but also realistic description, some exploration of innovative technique and, in subject matter, an examination of the individual's relationships both to the natural world and modern civilization.

None of the above poets ever used the term "Confederation Poets", or any other term, for themselves as a distinct group. Nothing indicates that any of them considered themselves to be a group. They "were in no way a cohesive group." The "Confederation Poets" became known as a group by a later, retroactive process of canonization: "Malcolm Ross's retrospective application of the term ‘Confederation poets’ is a good example of canon-making along national lines.

Several reasons have been given for treating the Confederation Poets as a distinct group. Roberts, Lampman, Carman, and Scott were among the first critically acclaimed poets to be published after the formation of the Dominion of Canada". Lampman wrote about his excitement in encountering Roberts's work:

One May evening somebody lent me Orion and Other Poems, then recently published. Like most of the young fellows about me I had been under the depressing conviction that we were situated hopelessly on the outskirts of civilization, where no art and no literature could be, and that it was useless to expect that anything great could be done by any of our companions, still more useless to expect that we could do it ourselves. I sat up all night reading and rereading Orion in a state of the wildest excitement and when I went to bed I could not sleep.

The Confederation poets had some biographical and literary connections among They were about the same age, born in the early 1860s. Francis Zichy motes: "Roberts and Carman were cousins; Roberts briefly edited Goldwin Smith's Toronto literary magazine The Week, in which Carman published his first poem." Lampman also published in the Week, and he and Roberts became friends by mail. In the early 1890s, when Carman worked on the editorial staffs of The Independent and The Chapbook, and other American magazines, he published poems by the other three.

=== At the Mermaid Inn ===
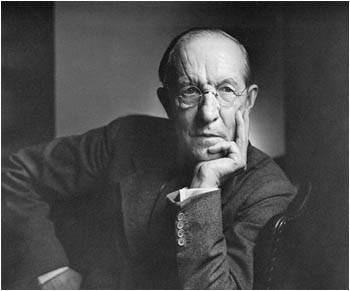
Duncan Campbell Scott

"Lampman and Scott were close friends; with Wilfred Campbell they began the column "At the Mermaid Inn" in the Toronto Globe, in 1892."

Originally they wrote the column in order to raise some money for Campbell, who was in financial difficulty. As Lampman wrote to a friend: "Campbell is deplorably poor.... Partly in order to help his pockets a little Mr. Scott and I decided to see if we could get the Toronto "Globe" to give us space for a couple of columns of paragraphs & short articles, at whatever pay we could get for them. They agreed to it; and Campbell, Scott and I have been carrying on the thing for several weeks now."

"Scott ... came up with the title for it. His intention was to conjure up a vision of The Mermaid Inn Tavern in old London where Sir Walter Raleigh founded the famous club whose members included Ben Jonson, Beaumont and Fletcher, and other literary lights."

Campbell expressed some unorthodox opinions in the column, including an outline of the history of the cross as a mythic symbol. When some readers of the Globe demanded an apology, Campbell apologized for overestimating their intelligence, further angering the readership and his fellow columnists.

The column ran until July 1893. In that year Campbell left to take a full-time civil service position in the Department of Militia and Defence. With his financial crisis over, the writers ended their column.

== Poetry ==
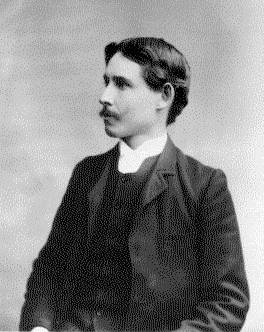
Archibald Lampman

The Confederation writers' poetry, while including some Canadian elements of style and content, showed the strong influence of English Victorian verse.

As is clear from the Lampman quote, what Roberts was striving for, and what Lampman was responding to, was not the idea of a distinctly Canadian poetry, a poetry 'of our own'. Rather, it was that a Canadian, 'one of our own,' was writing "great" poetry. Regardless of their explicit statements about nationalism, in terms of their aesthetics, the Confederation Poets were not Canadian nationalists, but thorough-going cosmopolitans. They did not intend to create a Canadian literature; they aspired to world-class literature created by Canadians.

In the late 19th century, world-class literature among English speakers meant British literature, which was Victorian by definition. These poets were writing in the tradition of late Victorian literature. The most obvious influences on them and others in that tradition were the Romantics.

The Confederation poets were the first to publish works in this traditional style while referring to Canadian events and places in their poetry: Roberts's "Tantramar," Carman's "Grand Pré," Lampman's "Lake Temiscamingue," Scott's "Height of Land," Campbell's "Lake Region." Canadian readers for the first time had the opportunity to read poetry by Canadians that had content related to their country. As Northrop Frye said in 1954,

"The impact of Lampman, Carman, Roberts, and D.C. Scott on Canadian poetry was very much like the impact of Thomson and Group of Seven painting two decades later," wrote literary critic Northrop Frye. "Contemporary readers felt that whatever entity the word Canada might represent, at least the environment it described was being looked at directly."

Frye saw other parallels between those four poets and the Group of Seven: "Like the later painters, these poets were lyrical in tone and romantic in attitude; like the painters, they sought for the most part uninhabited landscape."

The Oxford Companion to Canadian Literature says:

"All four poets drew much of their inspiration from Canadian nature, but they were also trained in the classics and were cosmopolitan in their literary interests. All were serious craftsmen who assimilated their borrowings from English and American writing in a personal mode of expression, treating the important subjects and themes of their day, often in a Canadian setting. They have been aptly called the first distinctly Canadian school of writers."

== Evaluation ==
=== Canonization ===
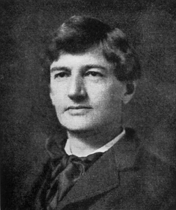
Bliss Carman

Like Thomson and the Group of Seven, the Confederation Poets became the new country's canon. This canon-building began in their lifetimes but, as noted, they were not identified as a group by that name until 1960.

In 1883 Roberts's friend Edmund Collins published his biography, The Life and Times of Sir John A. MacDonald, which devoted a lengthy chapter to "Thought and Literature in Canada." Collins dethroned men who had been ranked as English Canada's top poets, the 'three Charleses': Charles Heavysege, Charles Sangster, and Charles Mair. "Collins allots Heavysege only one paragraph, dismisses Sangster’s verse as 'not worth a brass farthing,' and ignores Mair completely." In contrast, Collins devoted fifteen pages to Roberts. "... more than anyone else, Edmund Collins is probably responsible for the early acceptance of Charles G.D. Roberts as Canada’s foremost poet."

In Songs of the Great Dominion (1889), anthologist W.D. Lighthall said "The foremost name in Canadian song at the present day is that of Charles George Douglas Roberts." Lighthall also included poetry by Roberts (who had published two books by then), Lampman, Campbell, and F.G. Scott (who had each published one book), and also by Carman and D.C. Scott, who had published in magazines although neither had yet published a book.

Adams suggests, "The publication in 1893 of a little anthology called Later Canadian Poems, edited by J.E. Wetherell, was a defining event in bringing attention to the Confederation Poets as a group." Roberts, Lampman, Carman, Campbell, the Scotts, and George Frederick Cameron are the male poets represented. That would be the pattern repeated in subsequent anthologies, with minor variations: Campbell boycotted being published in A Treasury of Canadian Verse (1900). He edited The Oxford Book of Canadian Verse (1913), devoting "more pages to his own poetry than that of anyone else."

These same poets were included in the books on Canadian literature that were published in the early 20th century: Archibald MacMurchy's Handbook of Canadian Literature (1906), followed by T.G. Marquis's English Canadian Literature (1913). "The decade following the First World War saw the appearance of five more handbooks on Canadian literature.... As different as these five books are from each other, they all recognize the accomplishments of the Confederation Poets as an important advance in Canadian literature."

=== Criticism ===
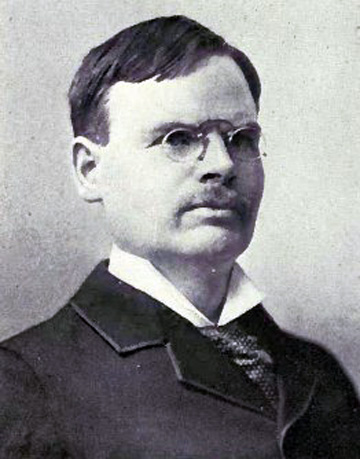
William Wilfred Campbell

As the canon, the Confederation Poets set the standard. Their work became the type of poetry Canadian readers wanted and expected, and therefore Canadian magazines published. Since that standard was Romantic and Victorian, the Confederation Poets have since been "blamed" by some for retarding the development of Modernist poetry in Canada. For example, the Twentieth-Century Literary Movements Dictionary says of them that: "Their legacy of Realism, Romanticism, and nationalism was so powerful that it lasted well into the first decades of the 20th century, beyond when much of their best work had been published."

The Montreal Group or McGill Movement complained of the influence of the older poets. They were "a group of young intellectuals under the influence of Ezra Pound and T.S. Eliot.... In Montreal the assault was spearheaded by The McGill Fortnightly Review (1925-1927), edited chiefly by two graduate students, A.J.M. Smith and F. R. Scott (son of Frederick George Scott)." "In various editorials, Smith argued that Canadian poets must go beyond the ‘maple-leaf school’ of Bliss Carman, Archibald Lampman, Duncan Campbell Scott, and Charles G.D. Roberts in favour of free verse, imagistic treatment, displacement, complexity, and a leaner diction free of Victorian mannerisms." The term "Maple Leaf School" was picked up from the progressive magazine Canadian Forum, which was waging a similar crusade for literary modernism.

"Probably the most resounding salvo by the Canadian Modernists is F. R. Scott’s 'The Canadian Authors Meet,' the first draft of which appeared in The McGill Fortnightly in 1927. One of its six stanzas lampooned the attention given to the Confederation Poets":

The air is heavy with Canadian topics,
And Carman, Lampman, Roberts, Campbell, Scott,
Are measured for their faith and philanthropics,
Their zeal for God and King, their earnest thought.

But, such complaints overlook that modernist poetry was being written in the 1920s: by W.W.E. Ross, Dorothy Livesay, Raymond Knister, and even by a couple of the Confederation Poets. By the 1930s Roberts had begun introducing the themes and techniques of Modernist poetry into his work. (See, for example, "The Iceberg" from 1931.) Scott had been doing the same since the early 1920s. (See, for example, "A Vision" from 1921.)

After Smith had gained a reputation as an anthologist of Canadian poetry (The Book of Canadian Poetry 1943, Modern Canadian Verse 1967), he changed his opinion of the Confederation Poets' work. He said that his earlier disparagement of them was due to youthful ignorance: "Bliss Carman was the only Canadian poet that we had heard of and what we heard, we didn't care for much. It was only later, when I began to compile books on Canadian poetry, that I found that Lampman, Roberts and Carman had written some very fine poetry."

=== Re-evaluation ===
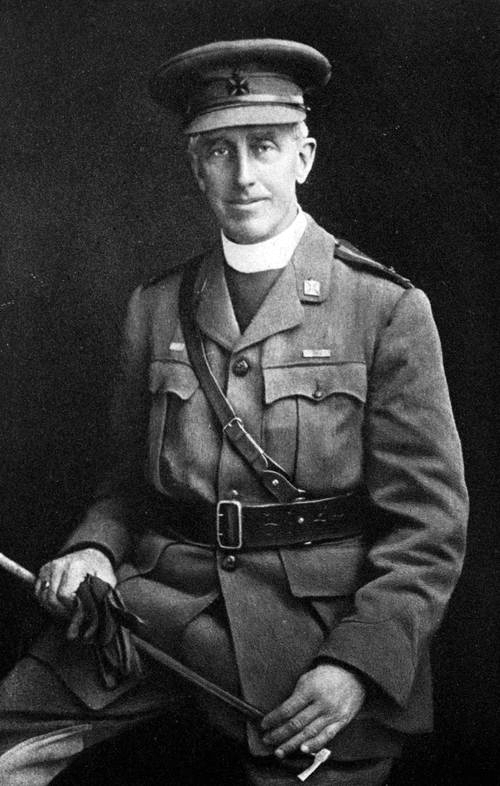
Frederick George Scott

The rehabilitation of the Confederation writers began with a rise of Canadian nationalism during the late 1950s, in what has been called "a cultural moment inspired by the founding of the Canada Council (1957), and the establishment of the New Canadian Library, with [Malcolm] Ross himself as general editor." Ross's Poets of the Confederation was published as New Canadian Library Original N01. "As Hans Hauge puts it, Ross ‘is beginning to construct a national literature and he does so by providing it with a past, that is to say, by projecting the project of a Canadian national literature into the past’ (‘The invention of national literatures’, in Literary Responses to Arctic Canada, ed. Jørn Carlsen, 1993)."

Ross said that his four Confederation Poets were Canadians who "were poets – at their best, good poets." "Here, at least, was skill, the possession of the craft, the mystery. Here was another – one like oneself. Here was something stirring, something in a book by one of ourselves,' something as alive and wonderful in its own way as the [achievements] of the railway builders. Our empty landscape of the mind was being peopled at last."

Ross de-emphasized, but did not question, the modernist debunking of the Confederation Poets: "It is natural enough that our recent writers have abandoned and disparaged 'The Maple Leaf School' of Canadian poetry. Fashions have changed. Techniques have changed."

Similarly, by the mid-1980s the modernist presumptions behind the Montreal Group's debunking were themselves being questioned. "A proper recognition of his nineteenth-century contexts can enhance our appreciation of Carman, and of his Confederation peers," Tracy Ware wrote in Canadian Poetry in 1984. "I am suggesting that Confederation poetry be given the respect that is customarily accorded the poetry of the McGill movement. Such a critical approach might succeed in removing the pervasive but dubious anti-Romantic tenets of Canadian modernism, tenets that have lingered here long after they have been questioned elsewhere."

In the same issue, Canadian Poetry editor D.M.R. Bentley, using Lampman's term for himself, dubbed the Confederation school "Minor Poets of a Superior Order." He argued that "What James Reaney has recently written of Crawford, Lampman and Roberts can be extended to Carman, Scott, Campbell, Sherman, Pickthall and others: they 'wrote well and were of note.'"
