= Song Fishermen =

Informal group of poets from Atlantic Canada from 1928 to 1930

The Song Fishermen, or the Song Fishermen's Circle (1928–1930), were an informal group of poets and writers from Atlantic Canada that included the Canadian poets Bliss Carman and Charles G. D. Roberts.

== History ==
The group was led by Andrew and Tully Merkel, whose Halifax, Nova Scotia, home became "a favourite rendezvous for writers and artists". The historian Thomas Raddall described the group in his memoirs:

In the mid-1920s some of the poets formed a sort of flying squad, calling themselves whimsically the Song Fisherman, including Charles G.D. Roberts, Bliss Carman, Robert Norwood, Evelyn Tufts, Stewart MacAuley, Kenneth Leslie, Ethel Butler and other lively spirits. ... From time to time this group made sallies by car into the countryside or by sail along the coast, always on the spur of the moment, and staying a day or a week wherever they chose to alight.

Other members of the set included Charles Bruce, James D. Gillis, and Joe Wallace. Besides road trips, the group organized recitals and lectures, produced broadsheets, and kept in contact with Maritime poets who had moved away from the region. Outside of poetry, writers associated with the group included novelist Frank Parker Day.

They published broadsheets and mimeographed Song Fishermen Songbooks which were distributed to fans across North America, including a published memorial to Bliss Carman after his death in 1929. Publishing was arranged by J. B. Livesay of Canadian Press, (modernist poet Dorothy Livesay's father). When that publishing outlet was closed in 1929, the Song Fishermen officially disbanded in September 1929 with a two-day celebration including poetry, reciting, piping, Highland dancing, and a marine trip to East Dover, Nova Scotia.

A short-lived attempt was made to revive the publishing arm of the group using Theodore Goodridge Roberts's Acadie publishing facilities in Saint John in 1930.

In The Quest of the Folk, Ian McKay discusses the anti-modernist tendencies of The Song Fishermen, who "combined Scottish romance with the cult of the fisherfolk".
