= Marjorie Pickthall =

Canadian writer (1883–1922)

Marjorie L.C. Pickthall
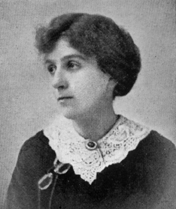
- Pickthall in Canadian Poets (1916)
- Born: Marjorie Lowry Christie Pickthall; 14 September 1883; Gunnersbury, London, UK
- Died: 22 April 1922 (aged 38); Vancouver
- Occupations: Novelist, poet, librarian
- Writing career
- Language: English
- Notable works: Lamp of Poor Souls, Woodcarver's Wife

Marjorie Lowry Christie Pickthall (14 September 1883, in Gunnersbury, London – 22 April 1922, in Vancouver) was a Canadian writer who was born in England but lived in Canada from the time she was seven. She was once "thought to be the best Canadian poet of her generation."

== Life ==
Marjorie Pickthall was born in 1883 in the west London district of Gunnersbury, to Arthur Christie Pickthall, a surveyor and the son of a Church of England clergyman, and Elizabeth Helen Mary Pickthall (née Mallard), daughter of an officer in the Royal Navy, part Irish and part Huguenot.

According to her father, Pickthall had planned her career before she was six; she would be a writer and illustrator of books. Her parents encouraged her artistic talents with lessons in drawing and music; an accomplished violinist, she continued studying the instrument until she was twenty.

By 1890, Pickthall and her family had moved to Toronto, Ontario, Canada where her father initially worked at the city's waterworks before becoming an electrical draftsman. Her only brother died in 1894.

Marjorie was educated at the Church of England day school on Beverley Street in Toronto, (possibly St. Mildred's College) and from 1899 at the Bishop Strachan School. She developed her skills at composition and made lasting friendships at these schools, despite poor health and suffering from headaches, dental, eye and back problems. Summers were spent walking and studying nature on the Toronto islands. As well, she read poetry: her favourite English poets were Fiona Macleod, William Morris, and Dante Gabriel Rossetti.

=== Canadian writing career ===
According to The Canadian Encyclopedia From an early age [Pickthall] contributed stories to the magazines and newspapers; and before her first book appeared, her genius was recognized. She sold her first story, "Two-Ears", to the Toronto Globe for $3 in 1898, when she was still a student at Bishop Strachan.

"Two-Ears" (along with one of Pickthall's poems) would go on the next year to win The Mail and Empire's writing competition. By the age of 17 she was writing for both the Mail and Empire and the Globe, contributing to their "Young People's Corner" and "Circle of Young Canada" pages.

Pickthall won the Mail and Empire contest again in 1900, this time for her poem "O Keep the World For Ever At the Dawn." "With its Canadian inflection of the dream landscapes of late-19th-century aestheticism and its impassioned language and musicality," says the Dictionary of Canadian Biography, "it attracted the attention of professors whose critical support would ensure Pickthall's lasting reputation." To those academics, Pickthall's "rejection of modernism ... and futurism's abrasive forms represented continuity with the idealism of the 'Confederation Poets'." In that year, she quit school and began to write full-time.

In July 1903 Pickthall's short story The Greater Gift was featured in the first edition of East and West (Toronto), a church magazine for young people. She became a regular contributor. Three serials she wrote for the magazine – Dick's Desertion: A Boy's Adventures in Canadian Forests (1905), The Straight Road (1906), and Billy's Hero, or, The Valley of Gold (1908) – were published as juvenile novels, illustrated by Charles William Jefferys.

In 1904 her poem "The Homecomers" won third prize in a poetry contest and caught the attention of Pelham Edgar, professor of English at the University of Toronto's Victoria College. He began publishing her work regularly in the college magazine, Acta Victoriana. He also introduced her to Sir Andrew Macphail, editor of the prestigious University Magazine, who also began regularly printing her poetry from 1907 on.

In 1905 Pickthall hired a New York agent, and soon began appearing in American magazines like the Atlantic Monthly, The Century Magazine, Harper's, McClure's, and Scribner's. "Pickthall wrote more fiction during her very productive decade after 1905. Her poetry might be highly praised, but it paid little, while stories fetched as much as $150."

Pickthall was devastated by her mother's death in February 1910. With the help of poet Helena Coleman, she got a job at the Victoria College library to make ends meet. However, back problems (and possibly a nervous breakdown) caused her to take a leave of absence in spring 1912. Later that year, determined to see some of the world, Pickthall went to England.

In her absence from Canada, Macphail's University Magazine published Pickthall's first collection of poetry, The Drift of Pinions, "in an edition of 1,000 boxed copies that sold out in ten days in November, 1913."

=== Move to England ===
In England, Pickthall first stayed with her uncle, Dr. Frank Reginald Mallard, in Hammersmith and then began renting Chalke Cottage in Bowerchalke, Wiltshire, with her second cousin Edith Emma Whillier. Successive summers were spent at Chalke Cottage. She began writing again and in 1914 wrote the historical novel Poursuite Joyeuse, which was published in 1915 as Little Hearts. The book was a failure; "it earned no more than £15. Nor, despite favourable reviews, did it facilitate Pickthall's entry into the London literary world, which she felt was closed to her as a colonial.... Moreover, she was out of touch with the American market."

In 1916 she published The Lamp of Poor Souls, an expanded volume of poetry.

During 1915 and 1916 Pickthall trained in automobile mechanics to do her part in the war effort. She was not accepted, so instead took work as a secretary and market gardener. This experience formed the basis of an essay, Women On the Land In England, which was subsequently published in East and West. It also led to an unsuccessful commercial venture in 1917, growing vegetables at Chalke Cottage with a woman known as Long-John.

In May 1918 health problems forced her to quit as assistant librarian in the South Kensington Meteorological Office, so she returned to Bowerchalke and completed 20 stories by the end of the year, "half of which were sold by January. Another creative burst between September and December 1919 produced a novel (The Bridge: A Story of the Great Lakes), a verse drama (The Wood Carver's Wife), and 16 stories."

=== Return to Canada ===
On 22 May 1920 she sailed from Liverpool for Toronto, and then journeyed on to Lang Bay in the Sunshine Coast area of British Columbia with Edith Joan Lyttleton; then on to the Boundary Bay summer camp of Isabel Ecclestone Mackay where she revised The Bridge. She then began a new novel, The Beaten Man: "She struggled over this novel in Victoria in the winter of 1920–21 ... and rejected five drafts."

'The Wood Carver's Wife', published in the University Magazine in April 1920, "was staged at the New Empire Theatre in Montreal in March 1921 and later at Hart House Theatre in Toronto." Audiences and reviewers responded enthusiastically.

In 1921 Pickthall settled in the Clo-oose community of the Ditidaht people on the west coast of Vancouver Island (a community immortalized in her poem, "The Sailor's Grave at Clo-oose, V.I."). Soon, though, her health failed and she was admitted to a nursing home in Victoria, British Columbia.

=== Death and commemoration ===
Pickthall was 38 years old when, 12 days after surgery, she died of an embolism in Vancouver in 1922. She is buried beside her mother in St. James Cemetery. Although her father was her executor her estate was bequeathed to her aunt, Laura Mallard, in whose home she had done most of her writing.

A collection of her poems and a volume of her collected short stories were both published posthumously.

"Her father compiled and published her Collected Poems in 1925 and again, definitively, in 1936."

== Writing ==
Marjorie Pickthall "stood as proof in the eyes of the next generation of female poets that women could indeed earn the respect and attention of a literary establishment dominated by men."

=== Poetry ===
"Pickthall's literary reputation rests ultimately on the ... poetry published during her lifetime." During her lifetime, that was a high reputation indeed. For John Garvin, writing in Canadian Poets in 1916, even back in Pickthall's days on the youth pages it had been "evident that a genius of a rare order had appeared in Canadian literature." Nor was he alone in thinking that. By 1913, when her first book of poetry was released: "For once the reviewers and critics generally were of one opinion that the work was the product of genius undefiled and radiant, dwelling in the realm of pure beauty and singing with perfect naturalness its divine message." Garvin quoted from the book review in Saturday Night magazine:

"The Drift of Pinions is exquisitely lyrical, with a flawless rhythm and melody.... This poet pays no heed to the headlines of to-day ... but goes her way in the world of iris-buds and golden fern, hearing and seeing only the things that are most excellent.... It is impossible in comment or quotation to give an idea of the subtle beauty of execution, the ideal spirituality of conception, which make such poems as 'The Lamp of Poor Souls' and 'A Mother in Egypt' poetic achievements of the rarest kind.... The singer's gifts are splendour and tenderness of colour, sweetness of silvery phrase, and a true poet's unwavering belief in 'the subtle thing called spirit.

At Pickthall's death, Pelham Edgar wrote: "Her talent was strong and pure and tender, and her feeling for beauty was not more remarkable than her unrivalled gift for expressing it." Archibald MacMechan called her "the truest, sweetest singing voice ever praised in Canada." In his 1925 biography, Marjorie Pickthall: A Book of Remembrance, Lorne Pierce could point to ten poetic tributes from top Canadian poets. Pierce himself praised her "Colour, Cadence, Contour, Craftsmanship."

Yet, as Donald A. Precosky writes in Pickthall's Poetry Foundation biography of today: "Probably no other Canadian writer has suffered such a plunge in reputation as Marjorie Pickthall.... Now her work, except for two or three anthologized pieces, goes unread.".

For Precosky, the reason for that change was simple: "The fact is that her initial popularity was based upon extraliterary criteria. Her rejection of modernism in style and attitude made her the darling of conservative Canadian critics." Such an artificial popularity would be transitory almost by definition. "But she has fallen victim to time.... modernism has replaced nineteenth-century romantic verse."

To a modernist like Precosky, the very things Saturday Night saw to praise in Pickthall's work a century ago – its flawless rhyme and rhythm, and that the poet does not write with an eye on the headlines – are the very things wrong with it:

The verses are gentle, dreamy, and musical yet somehow empty. She has nothing to say but she says it harmoniously. The world of her poetry, with its ivory towers, Persian lovers, and 'amber bars' of sunlight, is not drawn from life but from her reading of romantic literature."

Pickthall's poetry became, to an extent, a pawn in a literary game between traditionalists and modernists. Just as traditionalists like MacPhail boosted her poetry due to their rejection of modernism, modernists deprecated it due to their rejection of traditionalism; her decline in popularity was no less based on "extraliterary criteria" than her earlier popularity.

To take one notorious example: "In his On Canadian Poetry (1943), E.K. Brown ridiculed the poetry of Marjorie Pickthall with such malicious conviction that it is perhaps not surprising to find Lorne Pierce, whose loyal appreciation for Pickthall knew no bounds, rescinding his evaluation of the poet in the same year." Brown saw Pickthall as "the object of a cult" – the anti-modernist cult. To him, her verses represented "the final phase" of English Canada's tradition of Romantic poetry.

Finis

Give me a few more hours to pass
With the mellow flower of the elm-bough falling,
And then no more than the lonely grass
And the birds calling.

Give me a few more days to keep
With a little love and a little sorrow,
And then the dawn in the skies of sleep
And a clear to-morrow.

Give me a few more years to fill
With a little work and a little lending,
And then the night on a starry hill
And the road's ending.

— Marjorie Pickthall, The Canadian (Dec. 1919).

Pierce subsequently tried to offer a balanced judgement of her work in his Introduction to her 1957 Selected Poems, where he talked about both strengths and weaknesses. Pickthall's strengths, as he saw them, were "grace and charm, restrained Christian mysticism, and unfailing cadence;" her weaknesses, "preoccupation with the unearthly, with death and regret, with loneliness and grief, where the tendency is toward emotional interpretations of life, and rapture and intuition are substituted for the discipline of reason."

For Pierce, Pickthall had already begun to repeat herself by the time of her first book: "'Bega,' 'The Little Sister of the Prophet,' and 'The Bridgegroom of Cana,' all published in 1909, ... [show] the full maturity of her powers. When Drift of Pinions ... appeared in 1913, she had already written much of her best poetry, and was to continue not only the repetition of her favourite attitudes and metaphors, but even the vocabulary that included such words as gray, little, silver, rose, dreams, mist, dove, and moth."

Northrop Frye, for one, found Pierce's judgement too dismissive: "The introduction is written with much sympathy, but tends to confirm the usual view of this poet as a diaphanous late romantic whose tradition died with her.... I have some reservations about this. She died at thirty-nine: if Yeats had died at the same age, in 1904, we should have had an overwhelming impression of the end of a road to Miltown that we now realize would have been pretty inadequate.... Pickthall was, of course, no Yeats, but her Biblical- Oriental pastiches were not so unlike the kind of thing that Ezra Pound was producing at about the same time, and there are many signs of undeveloped possibilities in this book."

The comparisons to Yeats and Pound are apt. Like Pound and his mentor Eliot, Pickthall crammed her verses with literary allusions; but while this made Pound and Eliot cutting-edge to some, all it got her was the epithet, "Pickthall the Obscure." Like Yeats, she used recurring symbols (like the rose) throughout her poems; but while Yeats's symbolism has long been admired, Pickthall received only the criticism that she was repeating "even the vocabulary" of her older work.

"However," as Wanda Campbell noted in her essay on Pickthall in Hidden Rooms: Early Canadian Women Poets, "an increasing number of scholars are discovering that Pickthall, once labelled 'Pickthall the Obscure,' did indeed have something to say, though it was often buried beneath traditional forms, decorative surfaces, and Pre-Raphaelite lushness. Both Diana Relke and Alex Kizuk explore aspects of a feminist poetic and offer new interpretations of individual poems."

Kizuk's interpretation is interesting: "Pickthall's verse achieves that quality of poetic autonomy that Roman Jakobson called 'literariness.' Her verse might best be introduced as an intense apostrophe to literary beauty: a turning away from the trial to address the judges in impassioned language that an audience may only overhear. Her poems draw upon a body of literary precedents in order to construct a coherent and fantastic defence against unsatisfied desire and what she perceived to be a fundamental incoherence in modern life."

Discussing Pierce's later judgement, Sandra Campbell cautions the reader against accepting anyone's interpretations or judgements, urging him or her to read the poems instead and make a judgement of his or her own: "Sandra Campbell explains that Pierce had his own reasons for presenting Pickthall in this way, and argues for a reconsideration of her as 'A woman writer of pain and presence whom we all, male and female alike, ought to read, hear, see, and assess with new eyes.'"

=== Fiction ===
Much of Pickthall's fiction is disposable. Her three juvenile novels, for instance, were magazine serials, written to a formula to meet a deadline. "In each book a boy or young man, isolated by orphanhood or financial straits, is forced to undertake a journey, during which he must solve a trying problem; its solution, through a combination of luck ('Providence'), a new spiritual and moral rectitude, and a fresh sense of duty, leads to his re-integration into the family or society."

The Encyclopedia of Literature says: "Of Pickthall's adult fiction, Little Hearts (1915), set in the eighteenth-century Devonshire countryside, and The Bridge: A Story of the Great Lakes (1922), employ melodramatic incident." (The Bridge, like her juveniles, began as a magazine serial.) "As in most of her short stories, Pickthall in these novels fails to integrate fully descriptive detail, character, and incident."

Others have had more favorable impressions. Poet and critic Anne Compton wrote of Pickthall's first novel: "Little Hearts (1915) reveals an Impressionist's awareness of light and confirms Robert Garrett's observation that '[f]ew writers know how to paint air as she does.' Light erases outlines, turns landscapes fluid: ... 'a small wood lay, long and narrow, like a river turned to trees'.... Not only landscapes, but also characters, and their conditions, are depicted in terms of light.... As Oakshott expectantly enters the wood for a meeting, 'the world was a cool silver light that dazzled him.'"

In The Bridge, Pickthall "attempted a sharper psychological characterization and a realistic style culled from reading Balzac."

=== Drama ===
Because "Pickthall's reputation rests predominantly on her career as a poet," says the Columbia Encyclopedia of Modern Drama, "her play The Wood Carver's Wife has only recently gained the critical attention it deserves.'" Many have expressed their surprise on reading the play. Frye, for instance, wrote: "I expected to find it Celtic twilight with a lot of early Yeats in it. It turned out to be a violent, almost brutal melodrama with a lot of Browning in it."

Others have been surprised, considering Pickthall's reputation as the poster child for traditionalism, to find it to be a "modernist drama", "not typical of Pickthall's ... poetry." As a Modern Drama article by P. L. Badir was headlined: "'So entirely unexpected': the modernist dramaturgy of Marjorie Pickthall's The Wood Carver's wife."

The plot, set in pre-Conquest Quebec, concerns a carver who "murders his wife's lover in order to have a model for the proper expression of grief for his wooden pietà. Here Pickthall's use of synaesthesia conveys her vision of the complex web of human and natural realms, in which masculine containment contrasts with feminine intertwining. 'The cedar must have known ... I should love and carve you so,' the sculptor sang to his wife/model." "The Wood Carver's Wife touches on issues of gender, race, and eroticism, all charged with violence and intensity that though not easily accessible in the 1920s ultimately became an object of great interest for modern feminist critics."

== Publications ==
Pickthall published over 200 stories and approximately 100 poems, plus numerous articles. She was published in Atlantic Monthly, The Century Magazine, Harper's, McClure's, Scribner's, plus many other journals and young people's magazines.

=== Poetry ===
- "The Homecomers" (1904) and other successive poems in the periodical journal Acta Victoriana
- 1907 onwards – poems featured in University Magazine of McGill University in Montreal and were published as a collection The drift of pinions (1913)
- The Drift of Pinions (Montreal: University Magazine, 1913)
- The Lamp of Poor Souls, and Other Poems. (New York: Lane, 1916) – includes poems published in the earlier volume (reprinted 1972)
- The Wood Carver's wife, a verse-drama, begun in England in 1919 and finished in Victoria in 1920, first presented by the Community Players of Montreal at the New Empire Theatre.
- The Wood Carver's Wife, and Later Poems. Toronto: McClelland, 1922.
- Mary Tired. (London: Stonebridge Press, 1922)
- Two Poems (Toronto: Ryerson, 1923)
- Little Songs (McClelland, 1925)
- The Complete Poems of Marjorie Pickthall (Toronto: McClelland, 1925) – compiled by her father, including 'fugitive and hitherto unpublished poems' (2nd edition 1936)
- The Naiad and Five Other Poems (Toronto: Ryerson, 1931)
- The Selected Poems of Marjorie Pickthall, Ed. Lorne Pierce (Toronto: McClelland, 1957)

=== Stories ===
- "Two Ears" (1898) story, published in the Toronto Globe
- "The Greater Gift" (July 1903), in the first issue of East and West (Toronto)
- Angels' Shoes (London: Hodder, 1923) anthology of 24 short stories – Pickthall's proposed title was Devices and desires

=== Novels ===
- Poursuite Joyeuse (1914) – historical novel. published as Little Hearts (London: Methuen, 1915)
- The Bridge: a Story of the Great Lakes (London: Hodder, 1922)
  - novel, serialised in 1919 in Everybody's Magazine (New York) for $1,000 and The Sphere (London)
- The Beaten Man (1921) – unpublished novel, redrafted throughout 1920–21

=== Children's novels ===
- Dick's Desertion Toronto: Musson, 1905.
- The Straight Road Toronto: Musson, 1906.
- Billy's Hero, or, The Valley of Gold Toronto: Musson, 1908.

Except where noted, bibliographic information courtesy Brock University.
