= Francis Joseph Sherman =

Canadian poet

Francis Sherman
- Born: Francis Joseph Sherman; February 3, 1871; Fredericton, New Brunswick, Canada
- Died: June 15, 1926 (aged 55); Atlantic City, New Jersey
- Resting place: Forest Hill Cemetery, Fredericton
- Citizenship: British subject
- Education: University of New Brunswick
- Occupation: banker
- Spouse: Ruth Ann Sullivan
- Children: Francis, Jerry
- Writing career
- Language: English
- Genre: poetry

Francis Joseph Sherman (February 3, 1871 – June 15, 1926) was a Canadian poet.

He published a number of books of poetry during the last years of the nineteenth century, including Matins and In Memorabilia Mortis (a collection of sonnets in memory of William Morris).

== Life ==
Sherman was born in Fredericton, New Brunswick, the son of Alice Maxwell Myshrall and Louis Walsh Sherman. He attended Fredericton Collegiate School, where he came under the influence of headmaster George R. Parkin, "an Oxonian with an enthusiasm for the poetry of Rossetti, Swinburne, and, notably, Morris," who had also taught Bliss Carman and Charles G.D. Roberts. For a short time, Carman was one of Sherman's teachers.

Sherman entered the University of New Brunswick in 1886, but had to drop out after a year for financial reasons. Louis Sherman abandoned his family, and Francis, as the eldest of the seven children, had to help support them. In 1887, he took a junior post in the Merchants' Bank of Halifax in Woodstock, New Brunswick, transferring back to Fredericton the next year.

Charles G.D. Roberts, who first met Sherman in 1895, described him as "very tall, lean, very dark, with heavy black eyebrows like his mother, and with the large wistful eyes of the poet rather than the banker." Sherman was writing poetry at that time, and with Roberts's encouragement published his first book the next year.

Sherman was engaged to May Whelpey of Fredericton when they were both in their twenties. However, the marriage was called off after she was stricken with infantile paralysis.

By 1898, Sherman was the manager of the Merchants' Bank Fredericton branch, "the youngest man in Canada to hold such an office." He was transferred to the Montreal office in 1899, and in November of that year sent to Havana, Cuba, as the bank's first agent there. He "had established the bank's influence throughout Cuba and the Caribbean by 1901, when the Merchants' Bank changed its name to the Royal Bank of Canada."

Sherman last published work appeared at Christmastime, 1900, and he appears to have stopped writing poetry entirely in 1901. "Outside business hours, his chief hobby was reading, and collecting first editions. What little spare time remained he devoted to swimming and yachting. A love of the seas was in his veins. He sailed his own yacht, White Wings, in many races, and was Vice-Commodore of the Havana Yacht Club at the time of his return to Canada." Sherman stayed in Cuba until 1912, at which time he transferred back to Montreal.

When World War I broke out in 1914, Sherman left his bank position, enrolling with the Officers' Training Corps at McGill University, and then enlisting as a private for reinforcements of Princess Patricia's Canadian Light Infantry in 1915. In France, he became a captain and later was transferred to the Royal Canadian Pay Corps, where he reached the rank of major.

After the War Sherman returned to the Royal Bank, but had to resign in 1919 due to ill health caused by his military service.

Sherman married Ruth Ann Sullivan of Philadelphia on June 16, 1921. They had two sons, Francis and Jerry. Francis Sherman died in Atlantic City, New Jersey, in 1926, and is buried in Forest Hill Cemetery in Fredericton.

== Writing ==
=== Matins ===
In 1896, Sherman visited Bliss Carman's publishers, Copeland and Day, in Boston, taking with him "a slim manuscript of thirty poems in an assortment of styles, most either sonnets or ballads." Copeland and Day published them as his first book, Matins. Copeland and Day subsequently became the regular publisher of Sherman's work. Bliss Carman called Matins "the most notable first volume of verse of the past year," while Roberts called it "a work of considerable significance." In the United States, the Hartford Courant cited the book for "dignity, art, and much beauty of thought and expression", and the Boston Transcript added that it was "of genuine literary importance." Rudyard Kipling reportedly also praised the book.

The poetry of this first volume "is unmistakably derived from Rossetti and the early Morris". Many of the stories recall Morris poems: "a narrator speaks from beyond life, a fantastic setting is located beyond space and time, a ballad and a dramatic monologue are written in the Froissartian tone, interior and exterior landscapes reflect the speakers' disturbed psychological states, precise details of colour predominate, italics are used for effect, atmospheres are Medieval, and, in general, the subjects are love, fate, and death." At the same time, as Roberts notes, in "some respects Sherman was most akin to Rossetti. 'A Memory,' 'The Path,' 'The Last Flower' and 'The Kingfisher' ... vividly recall Rossetti's brilliance of light color, but most of all his rich imagery and sensuous recollection."

=== In Memorabilia Mortis ===
Sherman's next publication, In Memorabilia Mortis, also published in 1896, was an elegy he had composed just two months after Morris's death that October. The elegy consists of six stanzas, each of which is also a technically perfect sonnet. Roberts says of these that, "In mastery of the sonnet form, in beauty of cadence, in verbal felicity and adequacy of thought content, with the nineteen sonnets of lofty faith published, in 1899, under the title of The Deserted City, they fully establish him in the same rank with Lampman, our master sonneteer."

The elegy contains obvious allusions to Morris's work: "the seasonal and perceptual subjects of Sherman’s elegy recall The Earthly Paradise sequence of lyrics as a whole; in a sense, In Memorabilia Mortis returns Morris's art to him in a modified and relevant Canadian form and by so doing demonstrates the universality of his mythmaking project."

=== A Prelude ===
Sherman's long poem "A Prelude" was published privately by Copeland and Day in 1897. It "demonstrates a subtle shift away from the Pre-Raphaelites. Its diction is not as anachronistic as the previous collections, though it is still freighted with elevated language. Sherman incorporates Canadian foliage such as birches, maples, and pines more perceptibly here and allows himself a closer association to New Brunswick subject matter." Roberts called "A Prelude" "a sustained contemplative poem of nature interwoven with human interest, inspired with that seriousness, that unawareness of the trivial, so characteristic of all Sherman's work. It is written, with unfaltering technique throughout, in that most exacting Italian verse form, the Terza Rima, which scarcely any one else except Shelley has known how to handle successfully in English."

=== The Deserted City ===
Three years later, Copeland and Day published (again privately) The Deserted City, "nineteen lyrical and finely disciplined sonnets on faith and love, described by Roberts as the work of a 'master sonneteer'." Modelled on Dante Gabriel Rossetti's "House of Life," the sonnet sequence "demonstrates Sherman's attempts to reconcile spiritual/secular dichotomies by exploring the soul/body conflict." The Deserted City "exhibits a less elevated language and explores the Canadian scene in a more realistic sense" than in his earlier work.

=== A Canadian Calendar: XII Lyrics ===
Sherman's last collection was A Canadian Calendar: XII Lyrics, privately published in Havana in 1900. This cycle, meant to describe Canadian nature over a full year, show "a more authentic New Brunswick, partly because Sherman exhibits a greater diversity of metrical pattern than in previous works." Roberts calls this book "Sherman's most mature and deepest work. Life has marked him inescapably. The tragedy of his great love and his great loss inspires every one of these twelve poems, but always it is expressed interpretatively in terms of the changing seasons."

In this last book, "Sherman's ability to apply the techniques of Rossetti and, especially, Morris to specifically Canadian subjects appears most clearly.... Sherman presents the particularities of seasonal changes in landscape, as well as the correspondent variations in human mood, with sensitivity and clarity. Form and content blend. 'A Song in August' and 'Three Gray Days' are examples of this suitability."

=== An Acadian Easter ===
"An Acadian Easter," published in The Atlantic Monthly in 1900, is considered Sherman's strongest piece of work. "This is an attempt — a very successful attempt — to present an heroic and supremely tragic episode of Canadian history, the episode of Madame La Tour ... but impressionistically and by allusion. It is written in firmly woven but intensely emotionalized blank verse interspersed with plangent lyrics. It is a poetical, but hardly a popular, triumph."

The poem is a dramatic monologue spoken by Madame LaTour, "with varying stanza forms reminiscent of Morris's 'Sir Peter Harpdon's End' and 'Rapunzel'. Whereas the personal voice of Lady La Tour recalls that of Guenevere, her historical voice and situation have similarities with those of Peter Harpdon. The speaker's reflections on her betrayal by both love and history give her words the psychological intensity and nostalgic depth of the Guenevere poems.... Her vision is, then, 'Pre-Raphaelite but, at the same time, distinctively Canadian."

In her essay, "'There Was One Thing He Could Not See': William Morris in the Writing of Archibald Lampman and Francis Sherman," Karen Herbert sums up: "Sherman's integration of Canadian history, landscape, and perspective into Morris's psychological narrative, colour symbolism, and form creates an exemplary Canadian myth. All in all, Sherman's poetry acknowledges both his debt to Morris and Rossetti and his allegiance to a Canadian mode of vision and voice. This dialectic predominates in the work of Francis Sherman, a personally diffident but artistically assured turn-of-the-century Canadian poet."

== Recognition ==
In a 1934 address to the Royal Society of Canada, Roberts referred to the complete neglect of Sherman's work by critics.

In 1935 Sherman's Complete Poems were published, with a memoir by the editor, Lorne Pierce, and a foreword by Sir Charles G.D. Roberts.

In 1945, Sherman's name was added to the Canadian Government's list of Persons of National Historic Significance.

He is commemorated by a sculpture erected on the University of New Brunswick campus in 1947 that portrays him with fellow poets Bliss Carman and Sir Charles G.D. Roberts.

== Publications ==
- Matins. Boston: Copeland and Day, 1896.
- In Memorabilia Mortis. Boston: Copeland and Day, 1896.
- A Prelude. Boston: Copeland and Day, 1897.
- Two Songs at Parting. by John Bodkin and Francis Sherman. Fredericton: n.p., 1899.
- The Deserted City. Boston: Copeland and Day, 1899.
- A Canadian Calendar: XII Lyrics. Havana: n.p., 1900.
- "An Acadian Easter," The Atlantic Monthly, April 1900.
- The complete poems of Francis Sherman. Lorne Pierce ed., Sir Charles G.D. Roberts fwd. Toronto: Ryerson P, 1935.

Except where noted, bibliographical information courtesy of New Brunswick Literary Encyclopedia.
