= Basodee =

Black Canadian youth literature

Basodee: An Anthology Dedicated to Black Youth
- Author: Fiona Raye Clarke (editor)
- Cover artist: Magdelene Carson
- Language: English
- Genre: Anthology
- Publisher: General Store Publishing House (Canada)
- Publication date: 2012
- Publication place: Canada
- ISBN: 9781771230117

Basodee: An Anthology Dedicated to Black Youth (2012), edited by Fiona Raye Clarke, is a youth-created and youth-centred anthology created by a Black writing collective in honour of Black History Month, and authentic diversity in Canada. It highlights the Black Canadian experience and to promote awareness about the complexities of contemporary Black youth experience in Ontario.

The book consists of a foreword by the President of the Ontario Black History Society, Rosemary Sadlier, OOnt and work by various youth on issues of identity, belonging, and Canadian Black History.

The anthology was created in partnership with the Office of the Provincial Advocate of Children and Youth in Ontario a commission of the Legislative Assembly of Ontario which puts youth at its centre and uses rights to improve the lives and conditions of youth in systems of care in Ontario. The anthology was started in January 2012 and was published by General Store Publishing House in July 2012.

The title "Basodee" comes from the Trinidadian creole word of the same name meaning "half-conscious" and "disoriented." The term was chosen as the title of the book to express the confusion and identity crisis of Black Canadian youth.

The book consists of photography, essays, short stories and poetry by 13 youth expressing what it is to be young, Black and Canadian. Many are immigrants to the country or first-generation Canadians. Some have had experience with the mental health or criminal justice system and some are in care. Each shares their personal stories and views on what it means to be Black and Canadian today.

== Context ==
Basodee makes its debut at a time when concern about escalating gun violence in the City of Toronto such as the shooting at the Toronto Eaton Centre on June 2, 2012 and in Scarborough on July 16, 2012 has resulted in statements by Toronto Mayor Rob Ford that he wishes to force individuals convicted of a gun charge out of the city and more money from the province during a 'gun summit' for "anti-crime" initiatives such as the Toronto Anti-Violence Intervention Strategy (TAVIS) which places increased police presence in priority neighbourhoods.

In response to the July 16 shooting, the Toronto Star published a cartoon by Michael de Adder cartoon depicting a little black girl's alleged "expected" injuries before the age of two -"boo boo from highchair, mark from tricycle, and head laceration from a medium-caliber bullet." After numerous complaints the Star apologized for the cartoon's insensitivity to the complex issues at play in gun violence. It is media sanctioned expressions of negative stereotypes like these that Basodee tries to fight, using the voices of many of the youth these stereotypes and top-down solutions attempt to silence.

When many expressions of a voice other than the mainstream Canadian voice are being squelched and co-opted, such as Sway Magazine or Caribana due to economic considerations and a clear climate of devaluation of diversity, the Basodee collective comes together to bring true diversity back to the Canadian cultural milieu and show youth commitment to celebrations such as Black History Month, which are often seen as outdated and unnecessary in a post-racial "multicultural" society such as Toronto. Michael de Adder and Rob Ford's comments and many of the pieces in Basodee, however, prove that Toronto is very much a race conscious city and is nowhere near embracing multiculturalism as many have been publicly threatened by the chief city official with exile.

== Major themes ==
Some of the major themes in Basodee include identity, struggle and belonging. The book argues that part of the "basodeeness" of Black youth stems from "mis-education" about their history. The term "mis-education" is borrowed from Carter G. Woodson's book The Mis-Education of the Negro. Basodee contains essays outlining the history of discrimination in the Canadian education system against Blacks and the present struggle for solutions to this ongoing discrimination such as the establishment of the Africentric Alternative School.

The book also contains an essay tracing a history of Canadian human rights abuses against Blacks extending into the present day. Basodee argues that this history which is seldom spoken about form a major part of Black youth's basodeness. When many Black youth feel that dropping out of school and turning to a life of crime are the only way to protect themselves from discrimination and secure against mainstream attempts to erode their identity.

Given this real struggle of Black youth to safeguard their identity, the main thesis of Basodee is that Black youth in Canada have not been given a place of belonging in Canadian society, despite being here for generations and even since the time of slavery. Thus, the book presents examples from its contributors of how to find that identity – such as remembering where you came from, the struggles you have gone through, and undergoing negrescence.

== Purpose ==
The collective hopes that Basodee will one day become a resource to Black youth struggling to find themselves in the midst of media stereotypes, threats of exile, and stigmatization. In partnering with the Office of the Provincial Advocate for Children and Youth, the collective hopes to get the book in the hands of youth in the system who need the ideas it explores the most – Crown wards, youth in detention centres, and youth in care. The collective is currently looking for more organizations that work with Black youth as part of their mandate to share the book and also partner with in the future.

== See also ==
Black Canadians
