= Lorne Pierce =

Canadian publisher, editor, and literary critic

- Born: August 3, 1890; Delta, Ontario
- Died: November 27, 1961 (aged 71); Toronto, Ontario
- Occupations: Publisher, literary critic
- Spouse: Edith Chown (m. 1916)
- Writing career
- Period: 20th century
- Genres: History, editing

Lorne Albert Pierce (3 August 1890 – 27 November 1961) was a Canadian publisher, editor, and literary critic.

== Biography ==
Pierce was born in Delta, Ontario. He attended several universities including Queen's University in Kingston, Ontario, Victoria College at the University of Toronto and the Wesleyan Theological College in Montreal. He became a Methodist Church minister and later a United Church minister. In 1916, he married Edith Chown who came from a prominent Kingston family. In 1920, he was appointed as literary advisor to the Ryerson Press and from 1922 to 1960 he was editor.

Among the many writers whom Pierce fostered at Ryerson Press were Frederick Philip Grove, E. J. Pratt, A. J. M. Smith, Louis Dudek, A. M. Klein, P. K. Page, Dorothy Livesay, Earle Birney, and Marjorie Pickthall. Along with novels and poetry, Ryerson also published important anthologies and books of literary criticism. Pierce was a member of the Arts and Letters Club of Toronto; fellow members J. E. H. MacDonald and Frederick Varley designed covers and endpapers for some Ryerson books, and others such as Pratt and George Locke were published by the press. Beginning in 1927, Pierce edited the series of Ryerson books of prose and verse, which brought Canadian literature into Canadian school classrooms, and he was the author of critical studies of Pickthall and the early Canadian novelist William Kirby.

During his more than forty years as editor he oversaw the publishing and promotion of Canadian literature. A committed nationalist, he viewed literature as an important aspect of Canada's cultural development in the mid-twentieth century, Pierce lent his name to the Lorne Pierce Medal, established in 1926 to honor writers, critics, and educators for their outstanding contributions to the development of Canadian literature and culture.

== Works ==
- Our Canadian Literature, (1922) [co-edited]
- Albert Durant Watson: An Appraisal, (1923)
- Methodism And The New Catholicism, (1923)
- Primitive Methodism And The New Catholicism, (1923)
- Fifty Years Of Public Service: A Life Of James L Hughes, (1924)
- Marjorie Pickthall: A Book Of Remembrance, (c1925)
- In Conference With The Best Minds, (1927)
- An Outline Of Canadian Literature (French And English), (1927)
- William Kirby: A The Portrait Of A Tory Loyalist, (1929)
- Toward The Bonne Entente, (1929)
- The Chronicle Of A Century: Publishing, Churches, (1929) [edited]
- New History For Old: Discussions On Aims And Methods, (1931)
- English Canadian Literature 1882-1932, (1932)
- Unexplored Fields Of Canadian Literature, (1932)
- Three Fredericton Poets, (1933)
- Master Builders, (1937)
- A Postscript Of J E H Macdonald 1873-1932, (1940)
- Thoreau Macdonald, (1942)
- Marjorie Pickthall: A Memorial Address, (1943)
- E Grace Coombs (Mrs James Sharp Lawson), AOCA, OSA, (1949)
- In Memoriam: Charles W Jefferys 1869-1951, (1951)
- The House Of Ryerson, (1954)

== Legacy ==
The Lorne Pierce Medal remains an important award for the recognition of excellence in Canadian literature and criticism. After Pierce's death, his large collection of Canadian literary first editions was bequeathed to Queen's University in Kingston, Ontario, where it has been expanded and remains a significant repository of rare Canadian books.
