= New Canadian Library =

Subsidiary series publisher

- Parent company: McClelland & Stewart
- Founded: 1958
- Founder: Jack McClelland and Malcolm Ross
- Country of origin: Canada
- Headquarters location: Toronto
- Publication types: Books
- Official website: www.mcclelland.com/NCL/index.html

The New Canadian Library is a publishing imprint of the Canadian company McClelland and Stewart. The series aims to present classic works of Canadian literature in paperback. Each work published in the series includes a short essay by another notable Canadian writer, discussing the historical context and significance of the work. These essays were originally forewords, but after McClelland and Stewart's 1985 sale to Avie Bennett, the prefatory material was abandoned and replaced by afterwords.

It was founded by Malcolm Ross with the intention of providing affordable material for his students; David Staines has been the general editor of the series since 1986. In 2007, the University of Toronto Press published New Canadian Library: The Ross-McClelland Years, 1952-1978, a work by Janet Beverly Friskney that provides an account of the New Canadian Library during the years of Ross's editorship.

== Titles in the New Canadian Library ==
=== Numbered series ===
Originally, all titles in the series were numbered sequentially.

| Spine No. | Title | Author | Foreword by |
|---|---|---|---|
| 1 | Over Prairie Trails | Frederick Philip Grove | Malcolm Ross |
| 2 | Such Is My Beloved | Morley Callaghan | Malcolm Ross |
| 3 | Literary Lapses | Stephen Leacock | Robertson Davies |
| 4 | As for Me and My House | Sinclair Ross | Roy Daniells |
| 5 | The Tin Flute | Gabrielle Roy | Hugo McPherson |
| 6 | The Clockmaker | Thomas Chandler Haliburton | Robert L. McDougall |
| 7 | The Last Barrier and Other Stories | Charles G. D. Roberts | Alec Lucas |
| 8 | Barometer Rising | Hugh MacLennan | Hugo McPherson |
| 9 | At the Tide's Turn and Other Stories | Thomas Head Raddall | Allan Bevan |
| 10 | Arcadian Adventures with the Idle Rich | Stephen Leacock | Ralph Curry |
| 11 | Habitant Poems | William Henry Drummond | Arthur Phelps |
| 12 | Thirty Acres | Ringuet | Albert LeGrand |
| 13 | Earth and High Heaven | Gwethalyn Graham | Eli Mandel |
| 14 | The Man from Glengarry | Ralph Connor | S. Ross Beharriell |
| 15 | Sunshine Sketches of a Little Town | Stephen Leacock | Malcolm Ross |
| 16 | The Stepsure Letters | Thomas McCulloch | Northrop Frye |
| 17 | More Joy in Heaven | Morley Callaghan | Hugo McPherson |
| 18 | Wild Geese | Martha Ostenso | Carlyle King |
| 19 | The Master of the Mill | Frederick Philip Grove | R. E. Watters |
| 20 | The Imperialist | Sara Jeannette Duncan | Claude Bissell |
| 21 | Delight | Mazo de la Roche | Desmond Pacey |
| 22 | The Second Scroll | A. M. Klein | M. W. Steinberg |
| 23 | The Mountain and the Valley | Ernest Buckler | Claude Bissell |
| 24 | The Rich Man | Henry Kreisel | John Stedmond |
| 25 | Where Nests the Water Hen | Gabrielle Roy | Gordon Roper |
| 26 | The Town Below | Roger Lemelin | Glen Shortliffe |
| 27 | The History of Emily Montague | Frances Brooke | Carl Klinck |
| 28 | My Discovery of England | Stephen Leacock | George Whalley |
| 29 | Swamp Angel | Ethel Wilson | Desmond Pacey |
| 30 | Each Man's Son | Hugh MacLennan | Alec Lucas |
| 31 | Roughing it in the Bush | Susanna Moodie | Carl Klinck |
| 32 | White Narcissus | Raymond Knister | Philip Child |
| 33 | They Shall Inherit the Earth | Morley Callaghan | F. W. Watt |
| 34 | Turvey | Earle Birney | George Woodcock |
| 35 | Nonsense Novels | Stephen Leacock | S. Ross Beharriell |
| 36 | Grain | Robert J.C. Stead | Thomas Saunders |
| 37 | Last of the Curlews | Fred Bodsworth | John Stevens |
| 38 | The Nymph and the Lamp | Thomas Head Raddall | John Matthews |
| 39 | Judith Hearne | Brian Moore | John Stedmond |
| 40 | The Cashier | Gabrielle Roy | W. C. Lougheed |
| 41 | Under the Ribs of Death | John Marlyn | Eli Mandel |
| 42 | Woodsmen of the West | M. Allerdale Grainger | Rupert Scheider |
| 43 | Moonbeams from the Larger Lunacy | Stephen Leacock | Robertson Davies |
| 44 | Sarah Binks | Paul Hiebert | A. Lloyd Wheeler |
| 45 | Son of a Smaller Hero | Mordecai Richler | George Woodcock |
| 46 | Winter Studies and Summer Rambles in Canada | Anna Brownell Jameson | Clara Thomas |
| 47 | Remember Me | Edward Meade | Norman Shrive |
| 48 | Frenzied Fiction | Stephen Leacock | David Dooley |
| 49 | Fruits of the Earth | Frederick Philip Grove | M. G. Parks |
| 50 | Settlers of the Marsh | Frederick Philip Grove | Thomas Saunders |
| 51 | The Backwoods of Canada | Catharine Parr Traill | Clara Thomas |
| 52 | Music at the Close | Edward McCourt | Allan Bevan |
| 53 | My Remarkable Uncle | Stephen Leacock | John Stevens |
| 54 | The Double Hook | Sheila Watson | John Grube |
| 55 | Tiger Dunlop's Upper Canada | William Dunlop | Carl Klinck |
| 56 | Street of Riches | Gabrielle Roy | Brandon Conron |
| 57 | Short Circuits | Stephen Leacock | David Dooley |
| 58 | Wacousta | John Richardson | Carl Klinck |
| 59 | The Stone Angel | Margaret Laurence | W. H. New |
| 60 | Further Foolishness | Stephen Leacock | D. W. Cole |
| 61 | Marchbanks' Almanack | Robertson Davies | Gordon Roper |
| 62 | The Lamp at Noon and Other Stories | Sinclair Ross | Margaret Laurence |
| 63 | The Harbor Master | Theodore Goodridge Roberts | Desmond Pacey |
| 64 | The Canadian Settler's Guide | Catharine Parr Traill | Clara Thomas |
| 65 | The Golden Dog | William Kirby | Derek Crawley |
| 66 | The Apprenticeship of Duddy Kravitz | Mordecai Richler | Allan Bevan |
| 67 | Behind the Beyond | Stephen Leacock | Donald Cameron |
| 68 | A Strange Manuscript Found in a Copper Cylinder | James De Mille | R. E. Watters |
| 69 | Last Leaves | Stephen Leacock | J. M. Robinson |
| 70 | The Tomorrow-Tamer | Margaret Laurence | Clara Thomas |
| 71 | Odysseus Ever Returning | George Woodcock | W. H. New |
| 72 | The Curé of St. Philippe | Francis William Grey | Rupert Scheider |
| 73 | The Favourite Game | Leonard Cohen | Rowland J. Smith |
| 74 | Winnowed Wisdom | Stephen Leacock | None |
| 75 | The Seats of the Mighty | Gilbert Parker | Elizabeth Waterston |
| 76 | A Search for America | Frederick Philip Grove | Stanley E. McMullin |
| 77 | The Betrayal | Henry Kreisel | Sidney Warhaft |
| 78 | Mad Shadows | Marie-Claire Blais | Naïm Kattan |
| 79 | The Incomparable Atuk | Mordecai Richler | Malcolm Ross |
| 80 | The Luck of Ginger Coffey | Brian Moore | Keath Fraser |
| 81 | Essays, Controversies and Poems | John Sutherland | Miriam Waddington |
| 82 | Peace Shall Destroy Many | Rudy Wiebe | J. M. Robinson |
| 83 | A Voice from the Attic | Robertson Davies | Robert Cockburn |
| 84 | Next Episode (Prochain épisode) | Hubert Aquin | Ronald Sutherland |
| 85 | Roger Sudden | Thomas Head Raddall | J. R. Leitold |
| 86 | Mist on the River | Hubert Evans | W. H. New |
| 87 | The Fire-Dwellers | Margaret Laurence | Allan Bevan |
| 88 | The Deserter | Douglas LePan | F. W. Watt |
| 89 | Antoinette de Mirecourt | Rosanna Eleanor Leprohon | Carl Klinck |
| 90 | Allegro | Félix Leclerc | Elizabeth Jones |
| 91 | The End of the World and Other Stories | Mavis Gallant | Robert Weaver |
| 92 | In the Village of Viger and Other Stories | Duncan Campbell Scott | Stan Dragland |
| 93 | The Edible Woman | Margaret Atwood | Alan Dawe |
| 94 | In Search of Myself | Frederick Philip Grove | D. O. Spettigue |
| 95 | Feast of Stephen | Stephen Leacock | None |
| 96 | A Bird in the House | Margaret Laurence | Robert Gibbs |
| 97 | The Wooden Sword | Edward McCourt | Winnifred Bogaards |
| 98 | Pride's Fancy | Thomas Head Raddall | Fred Cogswell |
| 99 | Ox Bells and Fireflies | Ernest Buckler | Alan Young |
| 100 | Above Ground | Jack Ludwig | Margaret Laurence |
| 101 | New Priest in Conception Bay | Robert Lowell | Patrick O'Flaherty |
| 102 | The Flying Years | Frederick Niven | Jan de Bruyn |
| 103 | Wind Without Rain | Selwyn Dewdney | John Stevens |
| 104 | Tête Blanche | Marie-Claire Blais | Philip Stratford |
| 105 | Tay John | Howard O'Hagan | Patricia Morley |
| 106 | Canadians of Old | Philippe Aubert de Gaspé | Clara Thomas |
| 107 | Headwaters of Canadian Literature | Archibald MacMechan | M. G. Parks |
| 108 | The Blue Mountains of China | Rudy Wiebe | W. J. Keith |
| 109 | The Hidden Mountain | Gabrielle Roy | M. J. Edwards |
| 110 | The Heart of the Ancient Wood | Charles G. D. Roberts | Joseph Gold |
| 111 | A Jest of God | Margaret Laurence | G. D. Killam |
| 112 | Self-Condemned | Wyndham Lewis | Rowland J. Smith |
| 113 | Dust Over the City | André Langevin | Ronald Sutherland |
| 114 | Our Daily Bread | Frederick Philip Grove | D. O. Spettigue |
| 115 | The Canadian Novel in the Twentieth Century | George Woodcock | George Woodcock |
| 116 | The Viking Heart | Laura Salverson | Alison Hopwood |
| 117 | Down the Long Table | Earle Birney | Bruce Nesbitt |
| 118 | Glengarry School Days | Ralph Connor | S. Ross Beharriell |
| 119 | The Plouffe Family | Roger Lemelin | John Moss |
| 120 | Windflower | Gabrielle Roy | Lorraine McMullen |
| 121 | The Disinherited | Matt Cohen | John Moss |
| 122 | The Temptations of Big Bear | Rudy Wiebe | Allan Bevan |
| 123 | Pandora | Sylvia Fraser | David Staines |
| 124 | House of Hate | Percy Janes | Margaret Laurence |
| 125 | A Candle to Light the Sun | Patricia Blondal | Laurence Ricou |
| 126 | This Side Jordan | Margaret Laurence | G. D. Killam |
| 127 | The Red Feathers | Theodore Goodridge Roberts | Martin Ware |
| 128 | I Am Mary Dunne | Brian Moore | Alan Kennedy |
| 129 | The Road Past Altamont | Gabrielle Roy | Joyce Marshall |
| 130 | Knife on the Table | Jacques Godbout | Gillian Davies |
| 131 | The Manawaka World of Margaret Laurence | Clara Thomas | None |
| 132 | Consider Her Ways | Frederick Philip Grove | D. O. Spettigue |
| 133 | His Majesty's Yankees | Thomas Head Raddall | James Gray |
| 134 | Jean Rivard | Antoine Gérin-Lajoie | Vida Bruce |
| 135 | Bogle Corbet | John Galt | Elizabeth Waterston |
| 136 | A Choice of Enemies | Mordecai Richler | Bruce Stovel |
| 137 | Responses and Evaluations: Essays on Canada | E. K. Brown | David Staines |
| 138 | The Master's Wife | Andrew Macphail | Ian Ross Robertson |
| 139 | The Cruelest Month | Ernest Buckler | Alan Young |
| 140 | The Atonement of Ashley Morden | Fred Bodsworth | D. W. Cole |
| 141 | Wild Animals I Have Known | Ernest Thompson Seton | Alec Lucas |
| 142 | Scann | Robert Harlow | Robert Diotte |
| 143 | On Poetry and Poets | A. J. M. Smith | A. J. M. Smith |
| 144 | Crackpot | Adele Wiseman | Margaret Laurence |
| 145 | Sawbones Memorial | Sinclair Ross | Lorraine McMullen |
| 146 | The Diviners | Margaret Laurence | David Staines |
| 147 | High Bright Buggy Wheels | Luella Creighton | Rae McCarthy Macdonald |
| 148 | Big Lonely (formerly The Lonely Ones) | James Bacque | D. M. R. Bentley |
| 149 | Wooden Hunters | Matt Cohen | John Moss |
| 150 | God's Sparrows | Philip Child | Dennis Duffy |
| 151 | The Outlander | Germaine Guèvremont | Anthony Mollica |
| 152 | Great Comic Book Heroes and Other Essays | Mordecai Richler | Robert Fulford |
| 153 | Beautiful Losers | Leonard Cohen | Stan Dragland |
| 154 | The Emperor of Ice-Cream | Brian Moore | Patrick Moore |
| 155 | Garden in the Wind | Gabrielle Roy | Dennis Cooley |
| 156 | The Scorched Wood People | Rudy Wiebe | [[ ]] |
| 157 | The Lost Salt Gift of Blood | Alistair MacLeod | Joyce Carol Oates |
| 158 | Lord Nelson Tavern | Ray Smith | [[ ]] |
| 159 | Everything in the Window | Shirley Faessler | [[ ]] |
| 160 | The Camera Always Lies | Hugh Hood | [[ ]] |
| 161 | The Selena Tree | Patricia Joudry | [[ ]] |
| 162 | Watchers at the Pond | Franklin Russell | [[ ]] |
| 163 | Two in the Bush and Other Stories | Audrey Thomas | [[ ]] |
| 164 | Bloody Harvest | Grahame Woods | [[ ]] |
| 165 | The Neighbour and Other Stories | Naim Kattan | [[ ]] |
| 166 | The Manuscripts of Pauline Archange | Marie-Claire Blais | [[ ]] |
| 167 | Sandbars | Oonah McFee | [[ ]] |
| 168 | Selected Stories | John Metcalf | [[ ]] |
| 169 | The Angel of the Tar Sands | Rudy Wiebe | [[ ]] |
| 170 | The Innocent Traveller | Ethel Wilson | [[ ]] |
| 171 | The Sweet Second Summer of Kitty Malone | Matt Cohen | [[ ]] |
| 172 | Bear | Marian Engel | Aritha van Herk |
| 173 | Spirit Wrestler | James Houston | [[ ]] |
| 174 | The Coming of Winter | David Adams Richards | Rick Hillis |
| 175 | Five Legs and Communion | Graeme Gibson | [[ ]] |
| 176 | Laugh with Leacock | Stephen Leacock | [[ ]] |
| 177 | The Book of Eve | Constance Beresford-Howe | [[ ]] |
| 178 | The Channel Shore | Charles Bruce | [[ ]] |
| 179 | Amongst Thistles and Thorns | Austin Clarke | [[ ]] |
| 180 | Flowers of Darkness | Matt Cohen | [[ ]] |
| 181 | The New Ancestors | Dave Godfrey | [[ ]] |
| 182 | Judith | Aritha van Herk | [[ ]] |
| 183 | St. Lawrence Blues | Marie-Claire Blais | Margaret Atwood |
| 184 | Blood Ties | David Adams Richards | Merna Summers |
| 185 | St. Urbain's Horseman | Mordecai Richler | Guy Vanderhaeghe |
| 186 | The Lark in the Clear Air | Dennis T. Patrick Sears | [[ ]] |
| 187 | Lives of Short Duration | David Adams Richards | Alistair MacLeod |
| 188 | A Population of One | Constance Beresford-Howe | [[ ]] |
| 189 | Lunatic Villas | Marian Engel | [[ ]] |
| 190 | Cocksure | Mordecai Richler | Margaret Drabble |
| 191 | The Township of Time | Charles Bruce | [[ ]] |
| 192 | Bayo | Chipman Hall | [[ ]] |
| 193 | The Sparrow's Fall | Fred Bodsworth | [[ ]] |
| 194 | The Tiger in the Tiger Pit | Janette Turner Hospital | [[ ]] |
| 195 | The Mangan Inheritance | Brian Moore | Christopher Ricks |
| 196 | The Tent Peg | Aritha van Herk | [[ ]] |

=== Unnumbered series ===
Books published in the collection after the sequential numbering ceased were:

| Title | Author | Essay |
|---|---|---|
| The Acrobats | Mordecai Richler | Ted Kotcheff |
| Across the Bridge | Mavis Gallant | Robertson Davies |
| The Afterlife of George Cartwright | John Steffler | Renée Hulan |
| The Alley Cat | Yves Beauchemin | Kenneth Radu |
| Ancient Lineage and Other Stories | Morley Callaghan | William Kennedy |
| Anne of Green Gables | Lucy Maud Montgomery | Margaret Atwood |
| Any Time at All and Other Stories | Joyce Marshall | Timothy Findley |
| As Birds Bring Forth the Sun and Other Stories | Alistair MacLeod | Jane Urquhart |
| Black Robe | Brian Moore | Marilyn Bowering |
| Deep Hollow Creek | Sheila Watson | Jane Urquhart |
| Digging Up the Mountains | Neil Bissoondath | David Staines |
| Emily Climbs | Lucy Maud Montgomery | Jane Urquhart |
| Emily of New Moon | Lucy Maud Montgomery | Alice Munro |
| Emily's Quest | Lucy Maud Montgomery | P. K. Page |
| The Equations of Love | Ethel Wilson | Alice Munro |
| Evening Snow Will Bring Such Peace | David Adams Richards | Wayne Johnston |
| Execution | Colin McDougall | Warren Cariou |
| A Father's Kingdom | Sheila Watson | Glenn Wilmott |
| A Fine Balance | Rohinton Mistry | Pico Iyer |
| For Those Who Hunt the Wounded Down | David Adams Richards | Joan Clark |
| Good Bones | Margaret Atwood | Rosemary Sullivan |
| Hetty Dorval | Ethel Wilson | Northrop Frye |
| The Invention of the World | Jack Hodgins | George McWhirter |
| Joshua Then and Now | Mordecai Richler | Eric Wright |
| The Kissing Man | George Elliott | Bonnie Burnard |
| Life in the Clearings versus the Bush | Susanna Moodie | Carol Shields |
| Light Shining Out of Darkness and Other Stories | Hugh Hood | John Metcalf |
| Love and Salt Water | Ethel Wilson | Anne Marriott |
| Man Descending | Guy Vanderhaeghe | Leo McKay Jr. |
| The Man from the Creeks | Robert Kroetsch | |
| The Moslem Wife and Other Stories | Mavis Gallant | Mordecai Richler |
| Mrs. Golightly and Other Stories | Ethel Wilson | David Stouck |
| Murder in the Dark | Margaret Atwood | Steven Heighton |
| My Financial Career and Other Follies | Stephen Leacock | David Staines |
| Nights Below Station Street | David Adams Richards | P. K. Page |
| No Love Lost | Alice Munro | Jane Urquhart |
| Perpetual Motion | Graeme Gibson | Ramsay Cook |
| The Prophet's Camel Bell | Margaret Laurence | Clara Thomas |
| The Resurrection of Joseph Bourne | Jack Hodgins | Iain Higgins |
| Running in the Family | Michael Ondaatje | Nicole Brossard |
| The Sacrifice | Adele Wiseman | |
| A Season in the Life of Emmanuel | Marie-Claire Blais | Nicole Brossard |
| Solomon Gursky Was Here | Mordecai Richler | |
| Spit Delaney's Island | Jack Hodgins | Robert Bringhurst |
| The Street | Mordecai Richler | William Weintraub |
| Such a Long Journey | Rohinton Mistry | Alberto Manguel |
| Surfacing | Margaret Atwood | Marie-Claire Blais |
| Tales from Firozsha Baag | Rohinton Mistry | W. H. New |
| Tales from the Uncertain Country and Other Stories | Jacques Ferron | |
| Two Solitudes | Hugh MacLennan | Robert Kroetsch |
| The Whirlpool | Jane Urquhart | Lynn Coady |
| Who Has Seen the Wind | W. O. Mitchell | Robert Kroetsch |

=== Poetry collections ===
- Canadian Poetry: From the Beginnings Through the First World War edited by Carole Gerson and Gwendolyn Davies
- Poets Between the Wars edited by Milton Wilson
- Poets of Contemporary Canada 1960–1970 edited by Eli Mandel
- Poets of the Confederation
- Masks of Fiction
- Masks of Poetry
- Poetry of Mid-Century
- The Poems of Earle Birney
- Nineteenth-Century Narrative Poems
- The Poems of Bliss Carman
- Poems of Al Purdy
- The Damnation of Vancouver
- The Selected Poems of Irving Layton

=== Canadian writers ===
- Marshall McLuhan
- E. J. Pratt
- Margaret Laurence
- Frederick Philip Grove
- Leonard Cohen
- Mordecai Richler
- Stephen Leacock
- Hugh MacLennan
- Earle Birney
- Northrop Frye
- Malcolm Lowry
- James Reaney
- George Woodcock
- Farley Mowat
- Ernest Buckler
- Morley Callaghan
- Robertson Davies
