= The Dalhousie Review =

- Discipline: Literary journal
- Language: English

Publication details
- History: 1921 to present
- Publisher: Dalhousie University (Canada)
- Frequency: Triannual

Standard abbreviations
- ISO 4: Dalhous. Rev.

Indexing
- ISSN: 0011-5827
- LCCN: 24030546
- OCLC no.: 213801941

Links
- Journal homepage; Archives

The Dalhousie Review is a Canadian literary magazine, founded in 1921 and associated with Dalhousie University. It publishes three times a year, in the spring, summer, and fall. Content includes fiction, poetry, literary essays and book reviews.

== History ==
The Review was founded by Herbert L. Stewart, professor of philosophy at Dalhousie University, and the journal has been in continuous operation since then. Stewart edited The Dalhousie Review for twenty-six years, until January 1947. The review began with a strong Atlantic Canadian focus, printing philosophical articles and literary criticism alongside articles of interest to Halifax and the Atlantic region.

Since its inception, the Review has been receptive to diversity: to the work of political thinkers, historians, literary scholars, poets, and writers of fiction. Contributors during the magazine's early years included Archibald MacMechan, R. MacGregor Dawson, Sir Robert Borden, Duncan Campbell Scott, Eliza Ritchie, E. J. Pratt, Douglas Bush, Charles G. D. Roberts, Frederick Philip Grove, Robert Stanfield, Hugh MacLennan, Hilda Neatby, Eugene Forsey, Thomas Raddall, Earle Birney and A. J. M. Smith.

In the fifty-year period following Stewart's resignation (1947–97), The Dalhousie Review went through a variety of transformations in editorial emphasis and visual design, but without ever abandoning the direction chosen by its first editor. One of the more significant changes was the practice, adopted in the 1950s, of printing works of short fiction alongside discursive articles and poetry). Contributors of articles and reviews during the later period include Norman Ward, Peter Waite, George Woodcock, Mavor Moore, J. M. S. Tompkins, Owen Barfield, Chinua Achebe, Nadine Gordimer, Margaret Atwood, James Doull, Juliet McMaster, Wilfrid Sellars, Peter Schwenger, John Fekete, and Daniel Woolf.

This list includes distinguished contributors from Great Britain (Barfield and Tompkins), Africa (Achebe and Gordimer), and the United States (Sellars)—a sign of the increasing globalization of intellectual culture during the period in question. During the same period The Review published creative work by well-known poets (Miriam Waddington and Alden Nowlan) and award-winning fiction writers (Malcolm Lowry and Guy Vanderhaeghe) as well as work by many new and less celebrated creative writers.

Today academic articles and book reviews comprise about one quarter of an issue's content. Fiction and poetry comprise the other three quarters, roughly, and the journal no longer has a Halifax or Atlantic Canadian focus.
