= Patricia Blondal =

Canadian novelist (1926–1959)

- Born: Patricia Jenkins; December 12, 1926; Souris, Manitoba, Canada
- Died: November 4, 1959 (aged 32); Montreal, Quebec, Canada
- Education: University of Manitoba
- Occupation: writer
- Spouse: Harold Blondal
- Writing career
- Genres: fiction, poetry
- Notable work: A Candle to Light the Sun

Patricia Blondal, née Jenkins (December 12, 1926 – November 4, 1959) was a Canadian writer, best known for her novel A Candle to Light the Sun.

== Biography ==
Patricia was born in Souris, Manitoba, she grew up primarily in Winnipeg. She studied literature at the University of Manitoba, where she was a classmate of both Margaret Laurence and Adele Wiseman. In 1947, she graduated with a Bachelor of Arts. During this time she wrote both fiction and poetry, including an unfinished novel titled Brass Tower, but later destroyed much of her early writing. From 1958 on, she considered these years as the "poetry phase."

She married Harold Blondal, a physician who became a cancer researcher, in 1946. The couple had two children, Stephanie and John; She worked as a journalist as well as in public relations before devoting herself to getting published as a creative writer in 1955. Soon afterward, however, she was diagnosed with breast cancer, and died in 1959 just one month after A Candle to Light the Sun was accepted for publication by McClelland & Stewart; the novel was published posthumously in 1960, and was later reissued by the New Canadian Library series in 1976.

Blondal's only other published novel, From Heaven with a Shout, was serialized in Chatelaine before being published in book form in 1963. From her first novel to her second novel, her view point was shifted from Western Canadian to Western African. Most of Blondal's poetry was never published; however, one previously unpublished poem about her breast cancer treatment was released by her daughter Stephanie to the literary magazine Winnipeg Connection in 2006. The titles of her novels were taken from the Bible, specifically Thessalonians IV.

Blondal's personal records are held by the University of British Columbia Library.
