= John Errington =

John Errington may refer to:

- John Edward Errington (1806–1862), English civil engineer
- John Errington Moss (born 1940), Canadian author
- John Miles (musician) (born John Errington; 1949–2021), British musician
