= Canadian Literature (journal) =

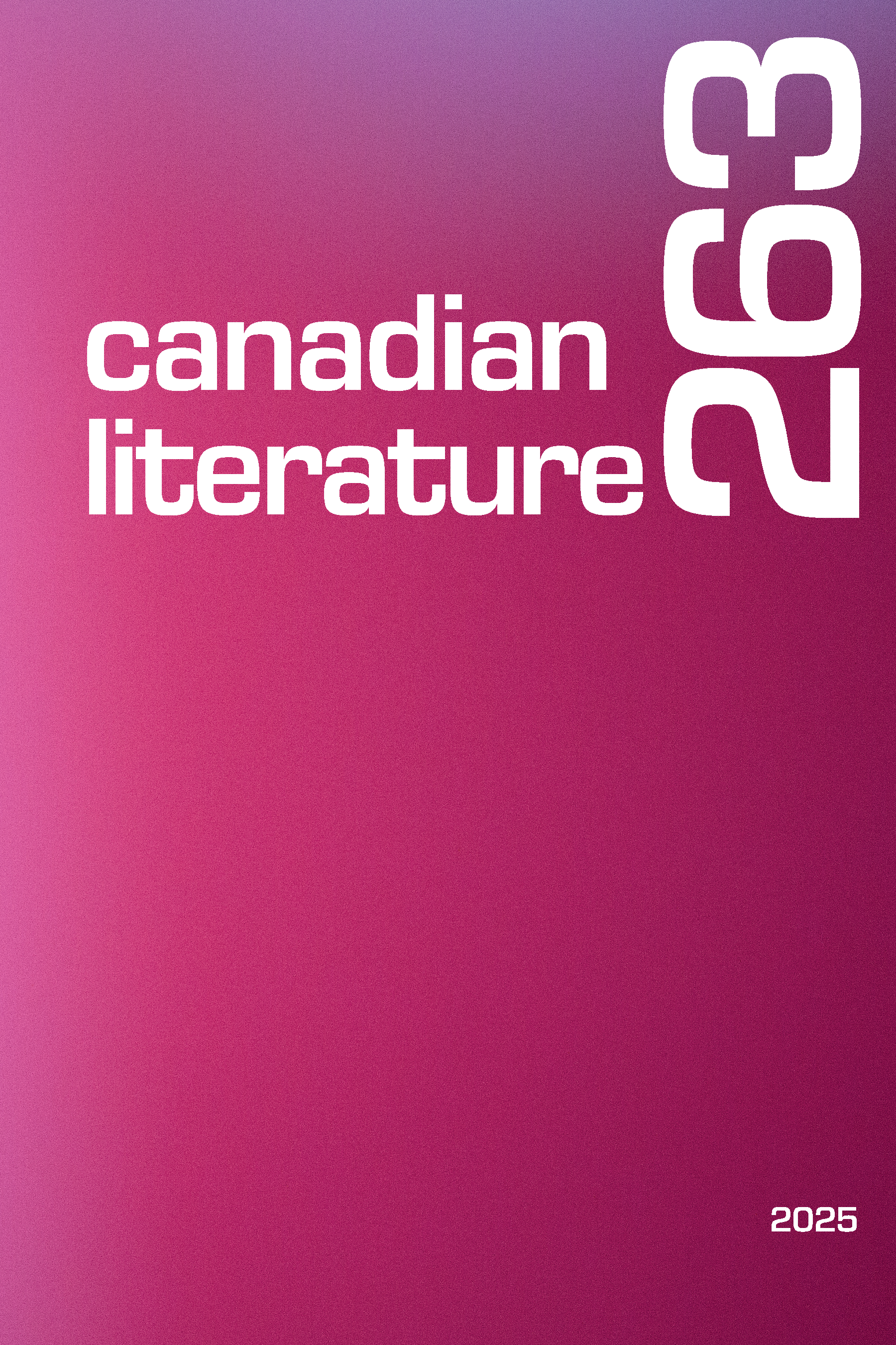
- Issue 263
- Discipline: Literature
- Language: English, French
- Edited by: Mary Chapman

Publication details
- History: 1959–present
- Publisher: University of British Columbia (Canada)
- Frequency: Quarterly

Standard abbreviations
- ISO 4: Can. Lit.

Indexing
- ISSN: 3110-9349 (print); 0008-4360 (web)
- OCLC no.: 1553179

Links
- Journal homepage; CanLitGuides Educational Resource; Open Journal Systems (OJS)

Canadian Literature is a quarterly peer-reviewed journal of criticism and review, founded in 1959 and owned by the University of British Columbia. The journal publishes articles of criticism and reviews about Canadian literature in English and French by Canadian and international scholars. It also publishes around 24 original poems a year and occasional interviews with writers. Each issue contains an extensive book review section. Rather than focusing on a single theoretical approach, Canadian Literature contains articles on all subjects relating to writers and writing in Canada. Each issue contains content from a range of contributors, and the journal has been described as "critically eclectic".

== Publication ==
Canadian Literature publishes both general and special issues. The general issues deal with a range of periods and topics, while the special issues focus on more specific topics, including issues on themes such as travel, ethnicity, women's writing, multiculturalism, and Indigenous literature; particular genres such as Canadian poetry, historical novels; life writing, and speculative fiction; or the work of prominent authors of Canadian literature such as Thomas King, P.K. Page, or Leonard Cohen.

The journal's average length is 208 pages. Canadian Literature reaches a global readership and is distributed in print in Canada, US, and twenty-five other countries. Institutions make up the majority of its print subscription base, which largely consists of university and college libraries. In 2007, Canadian Literature's subscriber base was 45% Canadian, 36% American and 19% international. The journal's back catalogue of issues is openly accessible through its website, which also houses original resources such as the CanLit Guides educational project, the CanLit Poets database, interviews, opinions, and other content. In 2013–14, the journal's website had 452,237 visitors and its articles were downloaded 193,506 times.

== History ==
=== Founding and early history ===
Canadian Literature was established in the autumn of 1958 by Roy Daniells and George Woodcock at the University of British Columbia. The first issue appeared in the summer of 1959, to skeptical reception because of a general belief that Canada had no national literature; some critics predicted that the journal would run out of material after only a few issues. Initially, editor George Woodcock intended that Canadian Literature would be fully bilingual in French and English, but due to the lack of French submissions, after ten years of publication French-language material never rose above 10% of an issue's content. At the time of its foundation, Canadian Literature was the first and only quarterly entirely devoted to the discussion and criticism of Canadian writing and literature.

Although the position of editor eventually went to George Woodcock, the university's first choice was a bibliographer, UBC's only specialist in Canadian literature, Reginald Watters; the position was offered to Woodcock after Watters decided to accept a fellowship in Australia. As editor, Woodcock strove to keep the journal from being purely academic, instead adopting a tone "serious but not academic, popular but not journalistic, contextual more than textual" (Fetherling). As the first journal dedicated to the study of Canadian writers and writing, Canadian Literature supported the "newly institutionalized field of Canadian literature" during a period of increasing cultural nationalism in Canada. Woodcock later attributed Canadian Literature's success to having arrived "at the right moment in the development of a Canadian literary tradition, and created its own ground swell of critical activity."

=== Peer review and expanded focus ===
Woodcock resigned from the editorship in 1977, having edited 73 issues of the journal. After Woodcock's retirement, the University of British Columbia invited William H. New, who had been an assistant editor since 1965, to act as editor. Under New's editorship, the journal "often placed the Canadian within the broader Commonwealth field" of postcolonial criticism. New chose to give priority to First Nations, Asian Canadian, Caribbean Canadian and other minority literatures, which previously had been under-represented in Canadian literary criticism. For example, in 1985 New had Joseph Pivato co-edit an issue devoted to Italian-Canadian writers (number 106), and in 1990 he edited the first special issue on Indigenous literatures in Canada, titled Native Writers & Canadian Writing (no. 124–125, published the same year as a book by University of British Columbia Press). New's work as the journal's editor has been described as "pioneer[ing] in changing preconceptions about Canadian writing throughout the 1980s" and the Canadian literary canon. New also set up a peer review process for the journal, with the goal of drawing readership from both general and scholarly audiences. New retired as editor in 1995, having edited 72 issues.

=== Editorial board and academic presence ===
Between 1995 and 2003, Eva-Marie Kröller was the editor. In addition to producing thirty-four issues, Kröller raised the journal's reputation worldwide by establishing an international editorial board made up of Canadian and international scholars. She refined the peer-review process for article submissions: currently, articles are assessed by two expert readers who are at arm's length from the author, whose name they do not know. In turn, their names are not revealed to the author (double-blind peer review). During Kröller's editorship, Canadian Literature fortified its commitment to Canadian francophone writers by appointing its first Associate Editor specifically for francophone writing, Michel Rocheleau. Under Associate Editor Réjean Beaudoin's guidance, Canadian Literature published several special issues featuring a majority of French content, such as "Littérature Francophone hors-Québec / Francophone Writing Outside Quebec."

As of 2025, the journal is edited by Mary Chapman (University of British Columbia), supported by associate editors Glenn Deer, Danielle Wong (both University of British Columbia), and Sophie McCall (Simon Fraser University). The journal also maintains an Associate Editor for Book Reviews, Nicholas Bradley (University of Victoria), and an Assistant Editor for Poetry, Phinder Dulai, and a Managing Editor, Brianne Colon. The international editorial board continues to reflect the journal's global reach, drawing scholars from institutions across Canada, the United States, the United Kingdom, Europe, and Asia.

=== Design changes and resources ===
In 1995, the journal underwent major design changes: it moved from plain beige covers to coloured, changed to a narrower trim, and added more pages to each issue in order to accommodate an expanded focus on themes such as postcolonialism, poetics, cultural history, and multiculturalism. The journal also continued publishing original poems by Canadian writers.

In 2003, Laurie Ricou, an ecocritic and specialist in the literature of the Pacific Northwest who had been either an associate or acting editor of Canadian Literature since 1983, became the journal's editor. In addition to publishing a range of special issues, Ricou oversaw the relaunch of Canadian Literature's website and the creation of the CanLit Poets resource. Ricou's term ended in 2007.

Beginning with issue 248 in Fall 2022, the journal introduced a bold redesign, replacing the earlier coloured covers with solid-cover backgrounds and the modern lowercase wordmark, signaling a more contemporary visual identity. With issue 254 in Winter 2023, the covers evolved further, incorporating gradient backgrounds that blend several colors, while retaining the distinctive large issue-number typographic treatment introduced in the 2022 redesign.

=== Online presence and contemporary history ===
In 2007, Margery Fee, a specialist in Indigenous literatures and Canadian literature and language, became the journal's fifth editor. During Fee's editorship, Canadian Literature made its back catalogue of issues openly accessible through the journal's website, and in 2012 launched the CanLit Guides open-access online educational resource, which uses archival material from the journal to teach students of Canadian literature about academic writing and reading.

Laura Moss was the journal's sixth editor, having taken over from Fee in 2015. In recent years, Canadian Literature has published special issues on topics such as Indigenous literature, Asian Canadian critique, the literature of Vancouver, global perspectives on Canadian literature, as well as issues supporting the work of emerging scholarship and graduate students. Moss's work as editor sought "to ensure that the journal continues to be vital to a wide readership," keeping in Canadian Literature's tradition of critical eclecticism while emphasizing the "social utility" of Canadian literary criticism and the "journal as a space to speak freely, debate passionately, think safely, question vigorously, argue vehemently, and express contentious opinion."

Christine Kim served as the journal's seventh editor from 2020 to 2025. An associate professor of English at the University of British Columbia, Kim specializes in Asian North American literature and theory, diaspora studies, and cultural studies. She is the author of The Minor Intimacies of Race (University of Illinois Press, 2016) and co-editor of Cultural Grammars of Nation, Diaspora, and Indignity (Wilfrid Laurier University Press, 2012). Her editorship continued Canadian Literature's commitment to publishing work on Asian Canadian critique and transnational perspectives, while bringing her expertise in diaspora and cultural studies to the journal's editorial vision.

Mary Chapman became the journal's eighth editor in 2025. A professor of English at the University of British Columbia, Chapman specializes in modernist and twentieth-century literatures, transnational American studies, suffrage literature and activism, women's poetry, periodicals, digital humanities, and public humanities. Her award-winning scholarly edition Becoming "Sui Sin Far": Early Fiction, Journalism and Travel Writing by Edith Maude Eaton (McGill-Queen's University Press, 2016) assembles uncollected texts from Edith Maude Eaton's early career. Her current research involves a microhistory of the family of Asian American authors Edith and Winnifred Eaton.

=== Anniversary celebrations ===
Canadian Literature celebrated its 50th anniversary in 2009 by holding a four-day gala from September 30 to October 3, 2009. It included a two-day conference entitled "The Future of Canadian literature / Canadian Literature" featuring talks by Canadian writers and scholars Thomas King, Roch Carrier, Steven Galloway and Aritha Van Herk, along with presentations and short talks by Canadian and international academics and graduate students.

The conference was followed by the launches of Sherrill Grace's book On the Art of Being Canadian, published by UBC Press and From A Speaking Place: Writings from the First Fifty Years of Canadian Literature, edited by W. H. New, and published by Ronsdale Press. A silent art auction to support undergraduate students interning at Canadian Literature included pieces donated by Margaret Atwood, Leonard Cohen, Dennis Lee, Thomas King, Patrick Lane, Joni Mitchell, and Fred Wah.

Canadian Literature's 60th anniversary was celebrated in 2019 with a reading emceed by the poetry editor, Phinder Dulai, featuring Jordan Abel, Sonnet L’Abbé, Daphne Marlatt, Cecily Nicholson, and Shazia Hafiz Ramji, followed by the awarding of the 60th Anniversary Graduate Student Essay Prize.

== Editors ==
- George Woodcock (1959–1977)
- W.H. New (1977–1995)
- Eva-Marie Kröller (1999–2003)
- Laurie Ricou (2003–2007)
- Margery Fee (2007–2015)
- Laura Moss (2015–2020)
- Christine Kim (2020–2025)
- Mary Chapman (2025–present)

== CanLit Guides ==
CanLit Guides is an online, open-access, and flexible educational resource created and maintained by Canadian Literature. The project is designed to supplement classroom learning and assist students and educators to critically engage with Canadian writing while promoting independent study. The website offers a variety of content composed of textbook-style modular "Chapters" that are organized into larger thematic "Guides", available for users to curate into customized reading lists. The Chapters and Guides cover topics of importance to studying, reading, contextualizing, and writing about Canadian literature, including on literary theory; literary, cultural, and political history; specific authors and works of fiction, non-fiction, poetry, and drama; and skills-based research and composition topics. CanLit Guides draws from Canadian Literature's journal archives of articles, editorials, reviews, and poetryt. The chapters and activities are freely accessible to the public and published to support learning at undergraduate and advanced high school levels.

In 2018, CanLit Guides expanded by launching new peer-reviewed Chapters written by external specialists from across Canada and internationally. The website serves a wide international user base that has gradually expanded from ~18,000 users in its inaugural year, to now receiving roughly a quarter of a million visits annually from 75,000 users in 184 countries.

== Awards ==
In 1988, Canadian Literature became the only journal to win the Gabrielle Roy Prize for best English book-length studies in Canadian and Québec literary criticism. The US-based Council of Editors of Learned Journals (CELJ) presented Eva-Marie Kröller with a Distinguished Editor award in 2004 in recognition of her work with Canadian Literature. In 2004, William H. New was awarded the Governor General's International Award for Canadian Studies. In 2006, Eva-Marie Kröller and Laurie Ricou joined W. H. New, who was elected in 1986, as Fellows of the Royal Society of Canada, and Margery Fee became a Fellow of the Royal Society in 2017. In 2007, the governor general named New an Officer of the Order of Canada. In 2009, Canadian Literature won a Canadian Online Publishing Award for Best Cross Platform for their poetry archive CanLit Poets. In 2019, the Canadian Association of Learned Journals awarded the journal the Scholarly and Research Communication Innovation Award for its CanLit Guides project.

The publication of Canadian Literature is assisted by the Social Sciences and Humanities Research Council the UBC Faculty of Arts, and acknowledges the financial support of the Government of Canada through the Canada Magazine Fund towards web enhancement.

== Abstracting and indexing ==
The journal is indexed by, among others, Canadian Magazine Index, Canadian Periodical Index, European Reference Index for the Humanities, Humanities International Complete, and the MLA International Bibliography. It is indexed and abstracted by EBSCO Information Services, ProQuest, and ABES.
