= Lorne Pierce Medal =

Biennial award given by the Royal Society of Canada

The Lorne Pierce Medal is awarded every two years by the Royal Society of Canada to recognize achievement of special significance and conspicuous merit in imaginative or critical literature written in either English or French. The medal was first awarded in 1926. The award itself consists of a gold-plated silver medal and is currently awarded every two years if there is a suitable candidate. (Between 1926 and 1964 it was awarded annually.) The award bears the name of Lorne Pierce (1890–1961), who was editor of Ryerson Press for forty years, contributing greatly to the development and appreciation of Canadian literature, and who originally established the award.

== Recipients ==
Source: Royal Society of Canada

- 1926: Charles G. D. Roberts
- 1927: Duncan Campbell Scott, FRSC
- 1928: Bliss Carman
- 1929: Camille Roy, FRSC
- 1930: Sir Andrew Macphail, FRSC
- 1932: Archibald MacMechan, FRSC
- 1934: Frederick Philip Grove
- 1935: Édouard Montpetit, MSRC
- 1936: Pelham Edgar, FRSC
- 1937: Stephen Leacock, FRSC
- 1938: Mazo de la Roche
- 1939: Wilfrid Bovey, FRSC
- 1940: E. J. Pratt, FRSC
- 1941: Léon Gérin, MSRC
- 1942: Watson Kirkconnell, FRSC
- 1943: George H. Clarke, FRSC
- 1944: Audrey Alexandra Brown
- 1945: Félix-Antoine Savard, MSRC
- 1946: Charles Norris Cochrane, FRSC
- 1947: Dorothy Livesay
- 1948: Gabrielle Roy, MSRC
- 1949: John Murray Gibbon, FRSC
- 1950: Marius Barbeau, FRSC
- 1951: E. K. Brown
- 1952: Hugh MacLennan, MSRC
- 1953: Earle Birney, FRSC
- 1954: Alain Grandbois
- 1955: Bruce Hutchison, FRSC
- 1956: Thomas Head Raddall, FRSC
- 1957: A. M. Klein
- 1958: Northrop Frye
- 1959: Philippe Panneton
- 1960: Morley Callaghan
- 1961: Robertson Davies, FRSC
- 1962: F. R. Scott, FRSC
- 1963: Léo-Paul Desrosiers, MSRC
- 1964: Ethel Wilson
- 1966: A. J. M. Smith
- 1968: Robert Finch, FRSC
- 1970: Roy Daniells, FRSC
- 1972: Desmond Pacey
- 1974: Rina Lasnier, MSRC
- 1976: Douglas LePan, FRSC
- 1978: Carl Klinck, FRSC
- 1980: Antonine Maillet, MSRC
- 1982: Malcolm M. Ross, FRSC
- 1984: Sheila Watson
- 1986: Rudy Wiebe
- 1989: Maurice Lemire, MSRC
- 1991: Gilles Marcotte
- 1993: Alice Munro
- 1996: Clément Moisan, FRSC
- 1998: David Staines
- 2000: Jean-Louis Major, MSRC
- 2002: Sandra Djwa, FRSC
- 2004: W. H. New, FRSC
- 2006: Paul Wyczynski
- 2008: Rosemary Sullivan, FRSC
- 2010: Sherrill Grace, MSRC
- 2012: Aritha Van Herk
- 2014: Jack Hodgins
- 2016: Linda Hutcheon
- 2018: Margaret Atwood
- 2020: Michel Biron, MSRC
- 2022: Robert Lecker
- 2024: Ruth Panofsky
