= York University Libraries =

Library system in Toronto, Canada

Coordinates: 43.772288°N 79.505702°W

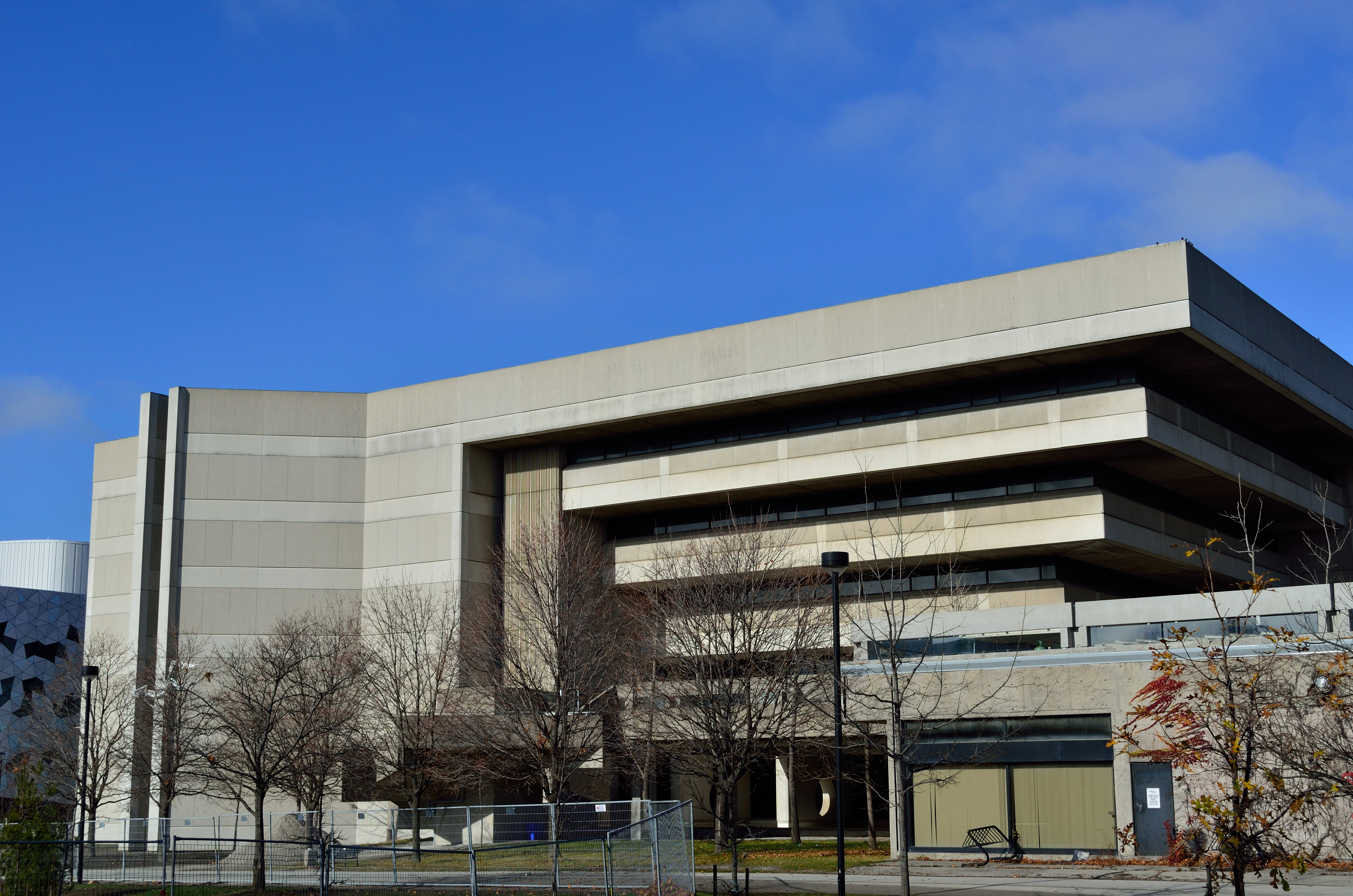
- Location of W.P. Scott Library
- Location: Toronto, Canada
- Type: Academic library
- Established: 1961; 65 years ago
- Branches: 4

Collection
- Size: 2,500,000 items

Access and use
- Population served: 50,000

Other information
- Director: Joseph Hafner
- Parent organisation: York University
- Website: Official website

York University Libraries (YUL) is the library system of York University in Toronto, Ontario. The four main libraries and one archives contain more than 2,500,000 volumes.

== History ==
The first York library opened in 1961 at Glendon College and was housed in Falconer Hall. In 1963 the library moved to its own building, named after recent Ontario premier Leslie Frost.

The first library on the large Keele campus was the Steacie Science Library (now the Steacie Science and Engineering Library), which opened in 1965, and was named after chemist Edgar William Richard Steacie.

The large W.P. Scott Library opened in 1971. The need to build an appropriate collection in a short space of time was immediate and pressing. Accordingly, chief librarian Thomas F. O'Connell, formerly at the Harvard Library, made arrangements to purchase the entire stock of two bookstores: the Starr Book Company in Boston and Librarie Ducharme in Montreal. An early decision was also made not to duplicate research strengths at the University of Toronto and soon the Libraries owned impressive collections in American history, French Canadiana, and later sociology and psychology. Archibald Macleish was awarded an honorary degree at a special convocation at the official opening of the building on 30 October 1971.

== Branches ==
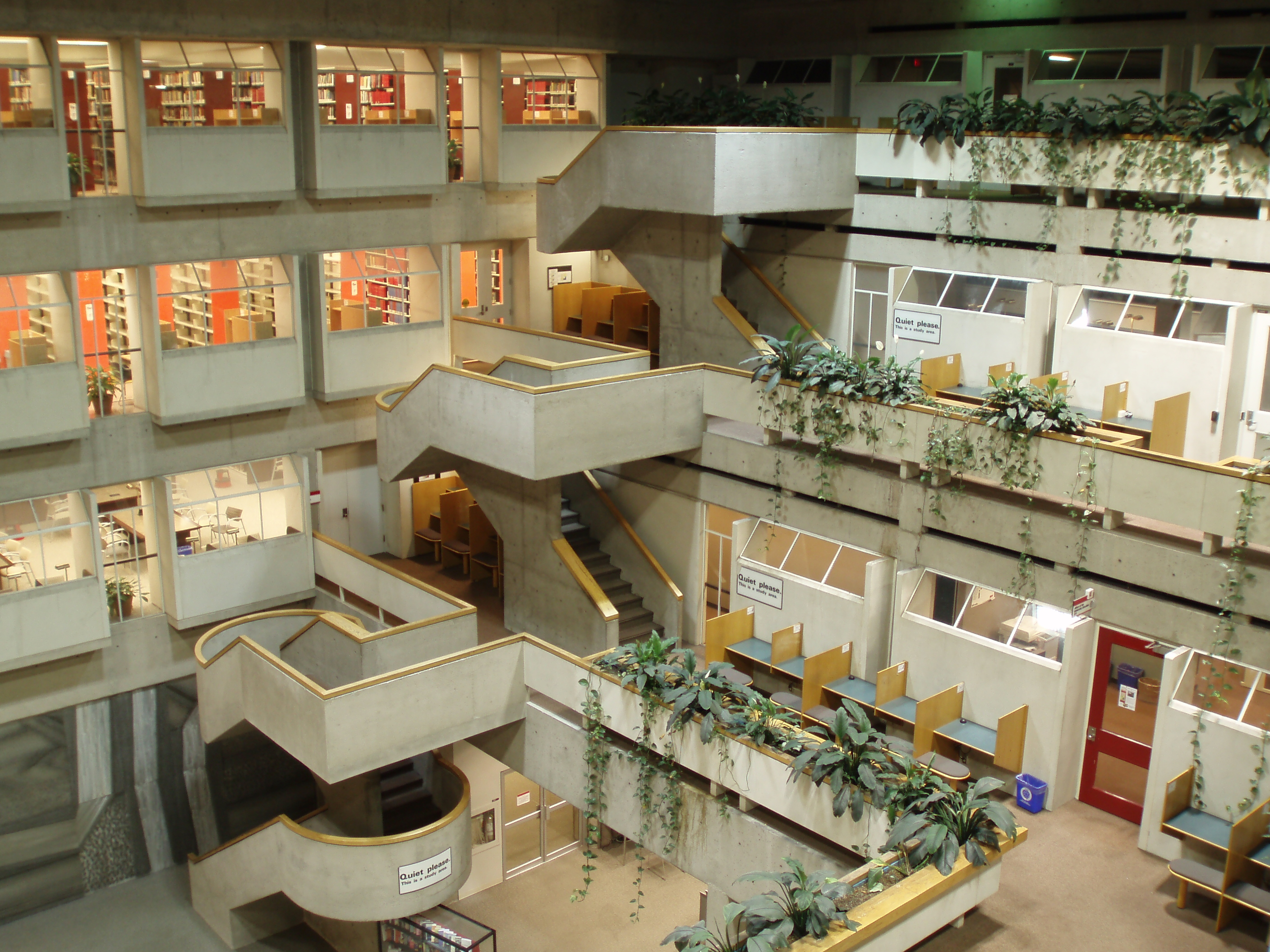
Stairs of Scott Library

The system has four branches, one containing two smaller libraries and an archives. At the main Keele Campus:

- W.P. Scott Library (for humanities, social sciences and fine arts). Separate film/music and map/GIS libraries are located within.
- Clara Thomas Archives and Special Collections (named after York professor Clara Thomas), also inside the Scott Library; it contains the literary and personal papers of many notable Canadian cultural figures such as Margaret Laurence, Rohinton Mistry, Av Isaacs, Adele Wiseman, bill bissett, Jean Augustine, and others.
- Steacie Science and Engineering Library.
- Peter F. Bronfman Business Library.

At the Glendon College campus:

- Leslie Frost Library at Glendon College, with a significant proportion of research materials in the French language.

At the Markham Campus:

- Markham Campus Library, with a reading room, gaming lab, media creation spaces and a makers space, which opened in fall 2024.

In addition to almost 150 full-time staff, approximately 40 academic librarians are responsible for faculty liaison, collection development, and research instruction across every major discipline and field taught at York.

Other libraries at York, which are not branches of YUL but work closely with it, include these, both on Keele Campus:

- Nellie Langford Rowell Library, affiliated with the School of Gender, Sexuality and Women's Studies
- Osgoode Hall Law School Law Library, the largest law library in Canada

The Archives of Ontario is on York's Keele campus but is not affiliated with York.

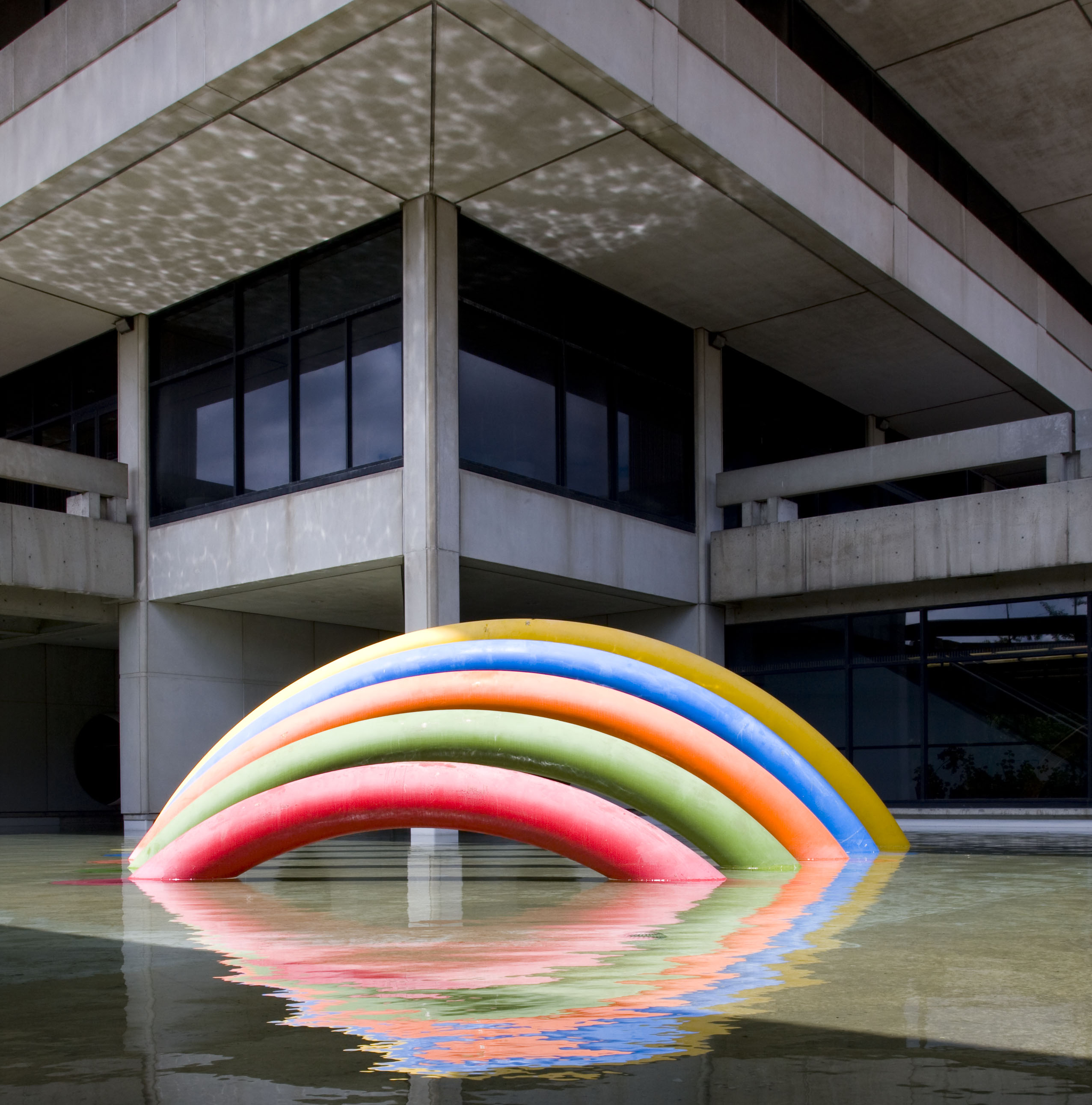
An outdoor art exhibit outside of Scott Library, Keele Campus

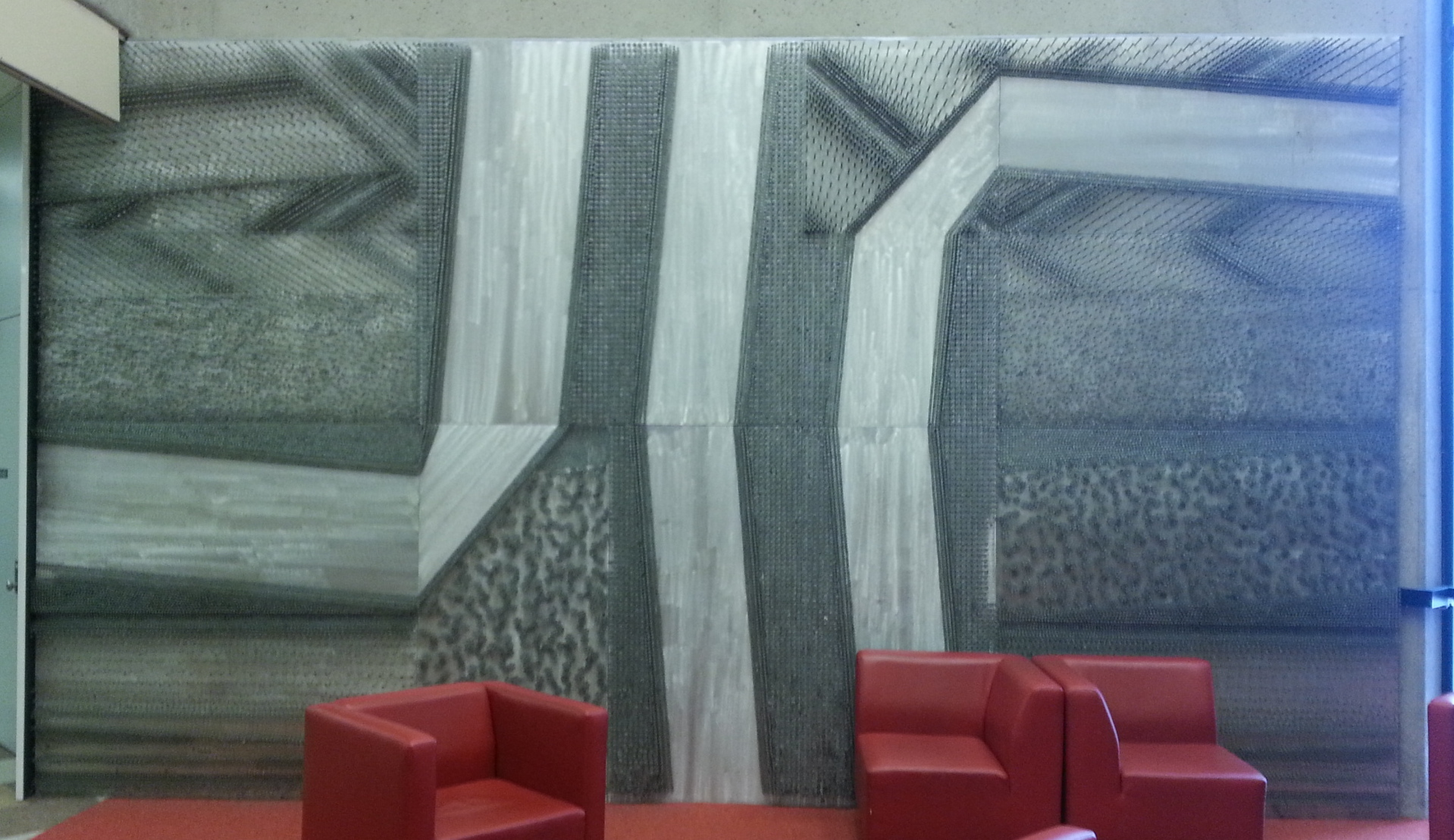
David Partridge's "Strata" (1969) (in Scott Library)

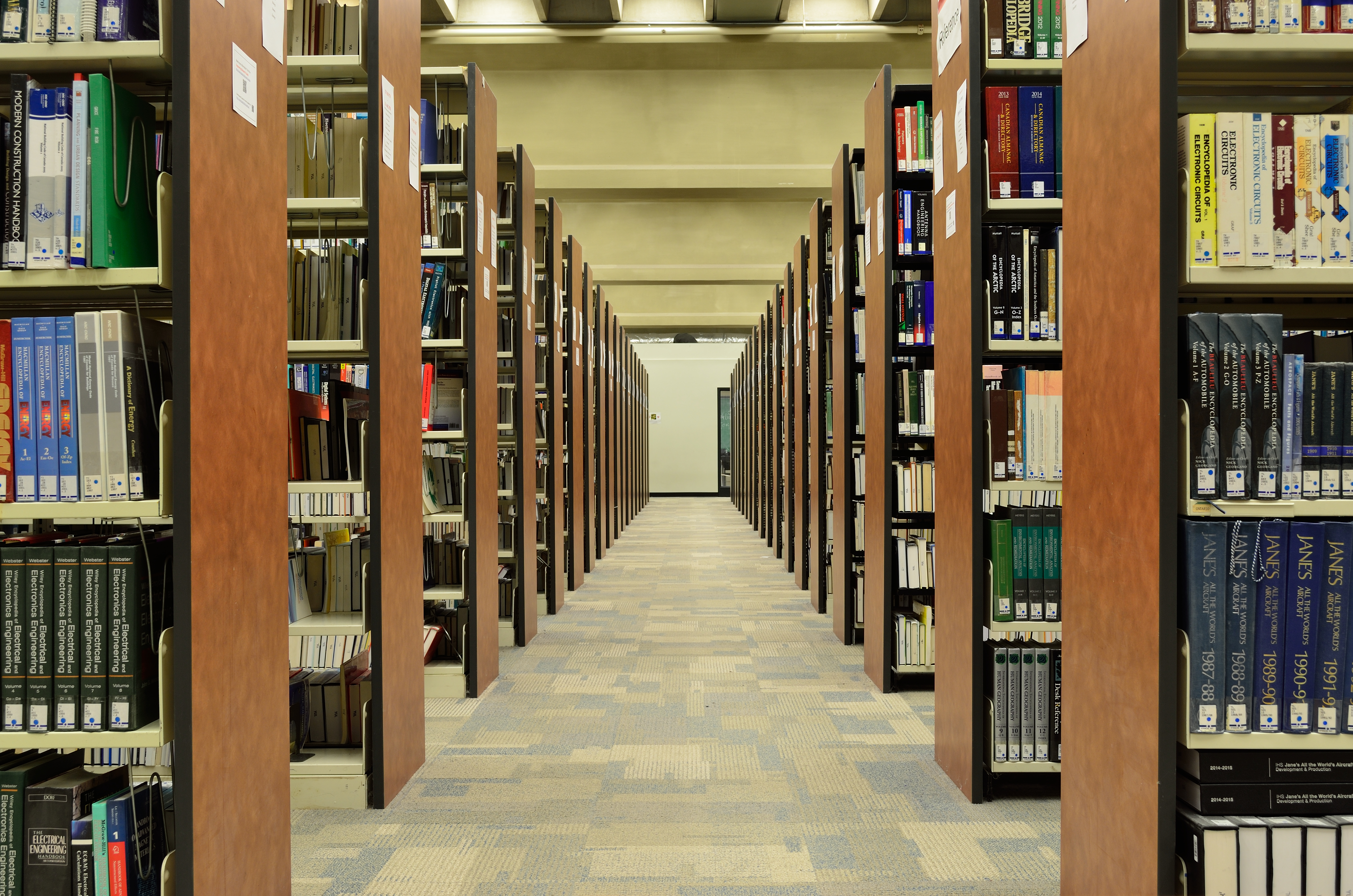
Steacie Science and Engineering Library

== Partnerships and collaboration ==
The Library is a member of the Canadian Association of Research Libraries, the Association of Research Libraries and the Ontario Council of University Libraries, and is a contributor to Open Content Alliance.

== Chief librarians ==
- Douglas G. Lochhead: 1960–63
- Thomas F. O'Connell: 1963–76
- William Newman (acting) 1976–78
- Anne Woodsworth: 1978–83
- Ellen J. Hoffmann 1983–2001
- Cynthia Archer: 2001–14
- Catherine Davidson (interim): 2014–15
- Joy Kirchner: 2015–2023
- Andrea Kosavic (interim): 2023–2024
- Joseph Hafner: 2024–

The position has been known by various titles through the years, changing from Director of Library Services to Director of Libraries to University Librarian, and then to Dean of Libraries.
