= George Elliott (Canadian writer) =

Canadian short story writer

George Matthew Elliott (4 July 1923 – 18 May 1996) was a Canadian short story writer.

== Biography ==
Born in London, Ontario, Elliott attended the University of Toronto, where he was an editor for the student newspaper, The Varsity. He later became editor of the Strathroy Age-Dispatch, in Strathroy, Ontario, and was that community's correspondent for the London Free Press. He later became a reporter and editor with the Timmins Daily Press. He was Vice-President (Creative) of MacLaren Advertising in Toronto. He served as Minister-Counsellor for Public Affairs at the Embassy of Canada in Washington D.C. from 1976 to 1980. He retired to St. Jean Ile d'Orleans, Quebec.

== Bibliography ==
=== Short story collections ===
- The Kissing Man. Toronto: New Canadian Library. 1962. ISBN 0-7710-3465-2.
- The Bittersweet Man. Guelph: Red Kite Press. 1994. ISBN 0-920493-10-6.
- Crazy Water Boys. Guelph: Red Kite Press. 1995. ISBN 0-920493-14-9.
- Sand gardens on First Beach. Guelph: Red Kite Press. 2010. ISBN 978-0-920493-18-2.

=== Travel/Photography ===
- God's Big Acre: Life in 401 Country (with photography by John Reeves). Toronto: Methuen. 1986. ISBN 0-45880400-2.

=== Stories ===
- "Hutchison's Lock". The New Quarterly. V (4). 1986.

== See also ==
Southern Ontario Gothic
