= Malcolm Ross (literary critic) =

Canadian literary critic (1911–2002)

Malcolm Mackenzie Ross
- Born: Malcolm Mackenzie Ross; January 2, 1911; Fredericton, New Brunswick, Canada
- Died: November 4, 2002 (aged 91); Halifax Regional Municipality, Nova Scotia, Canada
- Education: University of New Brunswick; University of Toronto; Cornell University
- Awards: Guggenheim Fellowship; Order of Canada; Lorne Pierce Medal

Malcolm Mackenzie Ross OC FRSC (January 2, 1911 – November 4, 2002) was a Canadian literary critic. He was a cofounder of the publishing imprint New Canadian Library and a member of the Canada Council.

== Education ==
Ross was born on January 2, 1911, in Fredericton, New Brunswick, the son of Cora Elizabeth Hewitson and Charles Duff Ross. He attended Fredericton High School before receiving a Bachelor of Arts degree in English and Philosophy from the University of New Brunswick in 1933. He received a Master of Arts degree from the University of Toronto in 1934 and a Ph.D. from Cornell University in 1941.

== Academic career ==
Prior to receiving his Ph.D. from Cornell, Ross had lectured there in its English department. From 1941-42, Ross taught at Indiana University-Bloomington. From 1945 to 1950, he taught at the University of Manitoba. In 1949, Ross received a Guggenheim Fellowship and spent six months studying at Harvard University and six months writing Poetry & dogma: the transfiguration of eucharistic symbols in seventeenth century English poetry in Pasadena, California.

Ross was a professor of English at Queen's University. He was head of the Department of English from 1957 to 1960 and held the James Cappon Professorship in English from 1960 to 1962. In 1962, he went to the University of Toronto and was the Dean of Arts from 1962 to 1968. From 1968 to 1982, he was a professor and a Thomas McCulloch Professor at Dalhousie University. He was also among the original Editorial Advisors of the scholarly journal Dionysius.

== Other career activities ==
Ross, alongside Jack McClelland, cofounded the New Canadian Library imprint, published by McClelland and Stewart, and for several years was its general editor. In 2007, the University of Toronto Press published New Canadian Library: The Ross-McClelland Years, 1952-1978, a work by Janet Beverly Friskney that provides an account of the New Canadian Library during the years of Ross's editorship.

Ross served on the Canada Council, where he was a chief policymaker. In Strange Bedfellows: The State and the Arts in Canada, George Woodcock relates a weekend he spent with Ross, Alex Colville, Dennis Lee, Gratien Gelinas, Pierre Trottier, and R. Murray Schafer as guests of Governor General Jules Leger at Rideau Hall in the autumn of 1976 to discuss and formulate a policy for the arts and culture in Canada.

== The World War II years ==
John Grierson, the head of the National Film Board of Canada (NFB), asked Ross to become the Head of Distribution at the NFB in 1942. There Ross's job was to supervise the distribution of all NFB productions, both theatrical and nontheatrical. This included rural, industrial, and trade union circuits, the preview library, and relations with volunteer projection services. He was also responsible for all foreign distribution and the translation of Canadian films into the leading European languages. He was also involved in advising the making of many propaganda films and, therefore, got to know directors such as Joris Ivens who did Action Stations and Corvette Port Arthur for the NFB. The Academy of Motion Picture Arts and Sciences (AMPAS) awarded a special Oscar for the work that the NFB did during World War II. In 1945, when Grierson was preparing to leave the NFB, he suggested Ross as one of three possibilities for his replacement; however, Prime Minister William Lyon Mackenzie King decided instead to downsize the NFB since the war was over.

== Honours ==
In 1976, Ross was made an Officer of the Order of Canada "for his contributions to numerous educational bodies and for his work as an author and as editor of the New Canadian Library". In 1982 he won the Lorne Pierce Medal.

Ross received honorary degrees from the following Canadian universities: St. Thomas (1976); Trent (1982); Dalhousie (1983); Queen's (1989); Windsor (1989); Toronto (1990); and Acadia (1991). In 1986, Scotland's University of Edinburgh also awarded Ross an honorary degree.

== Death ==
He died of pneumonia in Halifax, Nova Scotia in 2002.

== Selected works ==
- Our sense of identity: a book of Canadian essays (Ryerson Press, 1954)
- The arts in Canada: a stock-taking at mid-century (Macmillan, 1959)
- Poets of the Confederation (McClelland & Stewart, 1960)
- Poetry & dogma: the transfiguration of eucharistic symbols in seventeenth century English poetry (Octagon Books, 1969)
- Milton's Royalism: A Study of the Conflict of Symbol and Idea in the Poems (Russell & Russell, 1970)
- The impossible sum of our traditions: reflections on Canadian literature (McClelland and Stewart, 1986)
