= Roy Daniells =

Canadian poetry professor

- Born: April 6, 1902; London, England
- Died: April 13, 1979 (aged 77); Vancouver, British Columbia
- Education: University of Toronto; University of British Columbia
- Awards: Order of Canada
- Scientific career
- Fields: poetry
- Workplaces: University of Manitoba; University of British Columbia

Roy Daniells, CC (April 6, 1902 – April 13, 1979) was a Canadian poetry professor. He helped build the University of British Columbia's creative writing department and fostered the careers of several major Canadian writers.

== Education and career ==
Daniells was born in London (UK) on April 6, 1902, but received the bulk of his education in Canada following his family's relocation to Victoria, BC in 1910. He attended University of British Columbia (UBC) and University of Toronto, receiving a Ph.D. from the latter in 1936. Thereafter, he worked at the University of Manitoba, heading its English department until 1946 when he took a position at his alma mater UBC. When Garnet Sedgewick retired in 1948, Daniells became department head, holding that post until 1965. During that time, he helped establish a Creative Writing Department at UBC and also promoted the university's funding of studies in Canadian Literature.

In 1965, Daniells was named the first University Professor of English Language and Literature. Daniells helped the writing careers of Margaret Avison, Earle Birney, Joy Coghill, Daryl Duke, Roderick Haig-Brown, Eli Mandel, Margaret Laurence, Eric Nicol, Sheila Watson, Phyllis Webb, Adele Wiseman, and George Woodcock, among others. He retired in 1974.

There is a biography of Daniells by author Sandra Djwa.

== Publications ==
As an academic, Daniells had broad focus, specializing in John Milton and seventeenth century English literature, but also published widely on Canadian literature and history, including the 1969 volume Alexander Mackenzie and the North West (Great Travellers Series, London, Faber and Faber). He was also a poet with two published volumes.

== Awards and honours ==
- first University Professor of English Language and Literature (1965)
- Lorne Pierce Medal (1970)
- Companion of the Order of Canada (1971)

== Sources ==
- Roy Daniells Fonds
- BC Bookworld: Roy Daniells

Professional and academic associations
Preceded by Claude Ernest Dolman	President of the Royal Society of Canada; 1970–1971	Succeeded by Henry Duckworth
