= Clara Thomas (academic) =

Canadian academic

Clara Thomas FRSC
- Born: Clara McCandless; May 22, 1919; Strathroy, Ontario, Canada
- Died: September 26, 2013 (aged 94); Strathroy, Ontario, Canada
- Occupation: Academic

Academic background
- Education: University of Western Ontario (BA); University of Toronto (PhD)
- Doctoral advisor: Northrop Frye

Academic work
- Discipline: English literature
- Sub-discipline: Canadian women writer
- Institutions: York University

Clara Thomas FRSC (née McCandless; May 22, 1919 – September 26, 2013) was a Canadian academic. A longtime professor of English at York University, she was one of the first academics to devote her work specifically to the study of Canadian literature, and was especially known for her studies of Canadian women writers such as Anna Brownell Jameson, Susanna Moodie, Catharine Parr Traill, Isabella Valancy Crawford and Margaret Laurence.

== Background ==
Born in Strathroy, Ontario, she studied English literature at the University of Western Ontario. After graduating in 1941 she married Morley Thomas, a meteorologist. The couple spent some time living in Manitoba, where Clara taught university courses to military servicemen in Dauphin, before returning to Ontario where she worked at Western's library while completing her master's degree. She decided to study Canadian authors for her thesis, an idea so radical at the time that William Arthur Deacon, the books editor for The Globe and Mail, contacted her to offer his personal support.

After completing her master's she published Canadian Novelists, a biographical dictionary of 150 Canadian writers, in 1946. She then applied to the University of Toronto to pursue her doctorate, but her application was declined because she was married; although she accepted the decision at the time, she reapplied a number of years later and was accepted. Her academic supervisor, Northrop Frye, supported her interest in Canadian literature and encouraged her to publish her thesis on Jameson. She completed her doctorate in 1962.

== Career ==
She joined the department of English at York University in 1961, the first woman ever hired as a faculty member by that department and only the second female academic hired by the entire university. When she and Eli Mandel introduced the university's first dedicated Canadian literature course in 1969, interest was so high that within a week of the announcement and several weeks before registration for the course was even formally open, they had already received double the total number of registration requests that they had expected.

Her published work during her career at York included an essay on Moodie and Traill for the anthology The Clear Spirit; Ryerson of Upper Canada, a biography of Egerton Ryerson; The Manawaka World of Margaret Laurence, a critical study of Laurence's Manawaka sequence of novels; contributions to the omnibus Literary History of Canada; Love and Work Enough: The Life of Anna Jameson; and William Arthur Deacon: A Canadian Literary Life, a biography of Deacon, coauthored with colleague John Lennox, which was a shortlisted finalist for the Toronto Book Awards in 1983.

Thomas retired from full-time teaching in 1984, but remained with York as a professor emeritus and a research fellow in Canadian studies. She was also named a fellow of the Royal Society of Canada, received honorary degrees from York, Trent University and Brock University, and served on literary award juries. She continued to write literary criticism and biographical work for academic journals, as well as the afterwords for the New Canadian Library editions of works by Jameson, Laurence, Traill and Philippe-Joseph Aubert de Gaspé, and published the memoir Chapters in a Lucky Life in 1999.

== Personal ==
Following Morley's RCAF service in World War II, Thomas relocated to Toronto with a stint in Ottawa from 1951 to 1953. They lived in Sunnybrook area until they moved to Strathroy.

== Death and legacy ==
In 2005, York University's library system renamed its archival division the Clara Thomas Archives and Special Collections in her honour.

Thomas died on September 26, 2013, in Strathroy.
