= Aritha Van Herk =

Canadian writer, critic, editor and professor

Aritha van Herk CM AOE FRSC
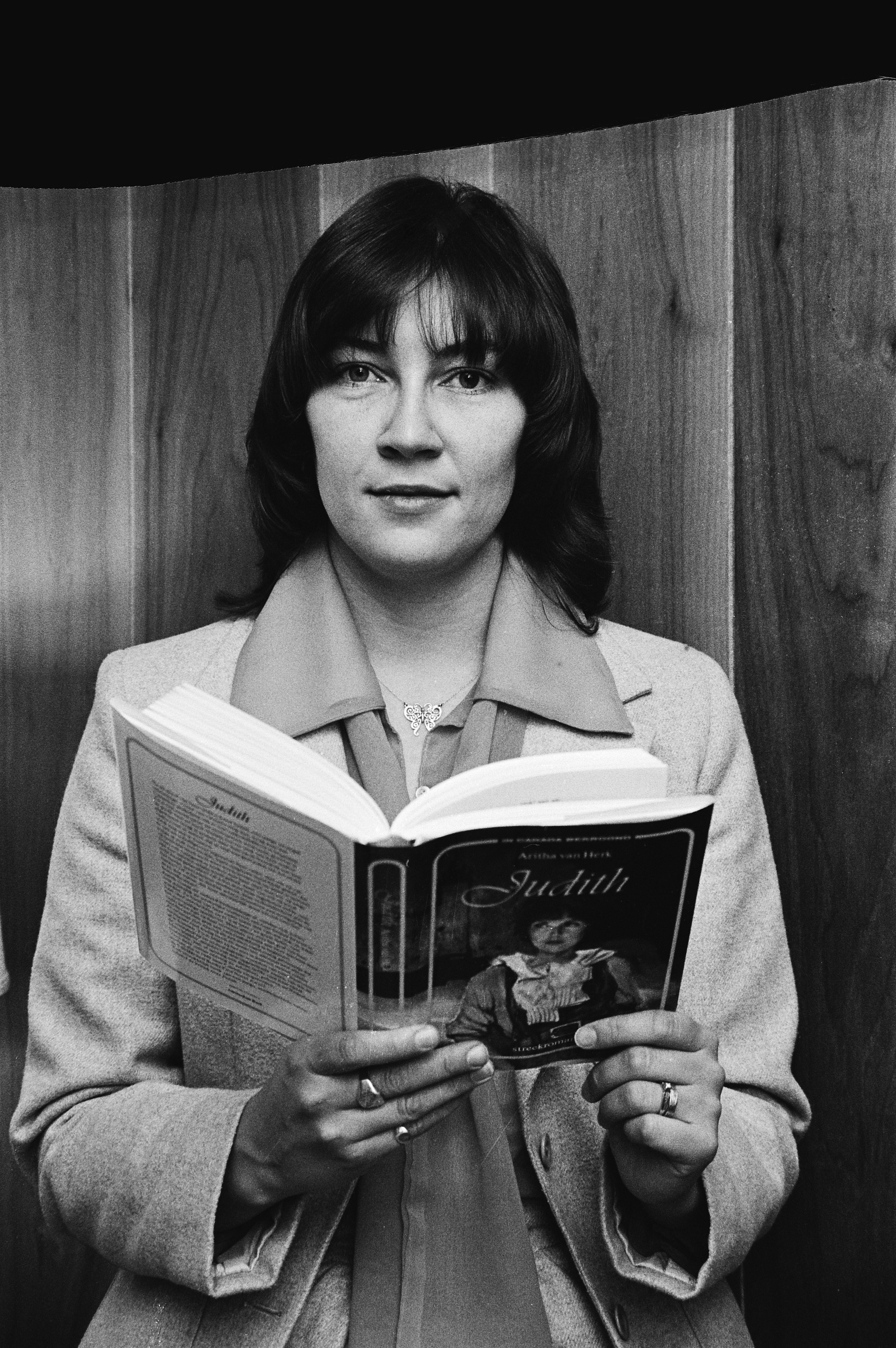
- Aritha van Herk (1979)
- Born: 26 May 1954 (age 72); Wetaskiwin, Alberta, Canada
- Education: University of Alberta (B.A., M.A.)
- Occupations: Critic, editor, writer, professor, public intellectual
- Honours: University of Manitoba (Hon. D.Can.L.); Athabasca University (Hon. D.Lit.)
- Writing career
- Notable work: Judith
- Notable awards: Seal First Novel Award; Howard O'Hagan Award; Grant MacEwan Author's Award; Lorne Pierce Medal
- Website: www.arithavanherk.com

Aritha van Herk, CM AOE FRSC, is a Canadian writer, critic, editor, public intellectual, and university professor. Her work often includes feminist themes, and depicts and analyzes the culture of western Canada.

== Early life and education ==
Aritha van Herk was born in Wetaskiwin, Alberta (near Edmonton), on 26 May 1954 and spent her childhood in the village of Edberg, Alberta. Her parents and elder siblings immigrated to Canada from the Netherlands before she was born, having endured Nazi occupation in WWII.

Van Herk studied Canadian literature and Creative Writing at the University of Alberta in Edmonton, graduating with a B.A. Honours degree in 1976, and an M.A. in 1978.

== Career ==
Since 1983, van Herk has been teaching at the University of Calgary. She teaches Creative Writing (prose), Canadian Literature (fiction), and Contemporary World Fiction in English, and Fiction by Women.

She won the University of Calgary Students' Union Teaching Excellence Award for the Faculty of Arts in 2011. In the same year, she received the Writers' Guild of Alberta's Golden Pen Lifetime Achievement Award and the Alberta Order of Excellence.

She received an honorary Doctor of Canon Law from St. John's College, University of Manitoba, in 2013.

In 2016, Van Herk gave the Lecture of a Lifetime at the University of Calgary and wrote a short book to commemorate the university's 50th anniversary.

She received an honorary Doctor of Letters from Athabasca University in 2018.

== Novels ==
Van Herk's writing career began with the publication of her M.A. thesis in 1978. Judith, a novel that explores a female protagonist's experiences in both rural and urban Canadian spaces, was the first winner of the Seal First Novel Award (C$50,000) from McClelland and Stewart, which granted the book international distribution throughout North America and Europe. In 2018, Judith was adapted to the stage by Heather Davies. The play, titled Judith: Memories of a Lady Pig Farmer, premiered at the Blyth Festival in Blyth, Ontario on 27 June 2018.

With her second novel, The Tent Peg (1981), van Herk continued to focus on issues of both female experience and the Canadian wilderness in a narrative where the female protagonist disguises herself as a man in order to get a job as a cook in a northern geological bush-camp.

Van Herk challenged literary conventions with her third novel, No Fixed Address: An Amorous Journey (1986), a parody of the picaresque genre in which underwear saleswoman Arachne Manteia traverses the Canadian prairies in her vintage Mercedes-Benz. The novel, nominated for the Governor General's Award, won the Writers' Guild of Alberta Award for Fiction.

Like No Fixed Address, van Herk's fourth novel Restlessness (1998) is written in an a-typical narrative form, and features another female character on the fly. In this reversed Scheherazade tale, Dorcas, a nomadic protagonist, divulges her life story to the man whom she has contracted to kill her.

== Criticism ==
Van Herk has published a number of works blending fiction and criticism, often set in the Canadian west and the far north. In 1990, she initiated a new genre she called geografictione, with Places Far From Ellesmere. As a travel narrative that analyzes the concepts of both travel and narrative, Places Far From Ellesmere questions the journeys that take place within fiction itself, including Tolstoy's Anna Karenina. Van Herk wrote the afterword for the 1990 New Canadian Library edition of Marian Engel's novel Bear and the introduction to the 2000 University of Alberta Press edition of Robert Kroetsch's The Studhorse Man.

Van Herk has also published two collections of essays and ficto-criticism, In Visible Ink (crypto-frictions) (1991) and A Frozen Tongue (1992). Both works combine aspects of fiction, memoir, poetry, and criticism.

== Non-fiction ==
Van Herk's more recent work has focused on the history of Alberta, with Mavericks: an Incorrigible History of Alberta (2001), winner of the Grant MacEwan Author's Award. Mavericks led to a permanent exhibition by the same name. It opened at Calgary's Glenbow Museum in 2007, was nominated for an Alberta Tourism Award in the category of Alberta Pride, and won the White Hat of the Year Award from the city of Calgary. Audacious and Adamant: the Story of Maverick Alberta (2007) was published to correspond with the Mavericks Exhibition.

== Periodical writing and professional work ==
Van Herk's short stories, essays, articles, and book reviews regularly appear in The Globe and Mail, Calgary Herald, Alberta Views, Elle, Chatelaine, Canadian Fiction Magazine, Canadian Geographic, and The Walrus, as well as other national and international periodicals and newspapers.

Van Herk is a Fellow of the Royal Society of Canada since 1997, and has served on juries, including the Governor General's Award and the Commonwealth Writers' Prize. As a university professor she has taught graduate students who have gone on to literary success, including Anita Rau Badami, Thomas Wharton, and Jessica Grant.

Van Herk continues to present her creative and critical work in venues in many countries.

== Bibliography ==
=== Novels ===
- Judith. Toronto: McClelland and Stewart, 1978.
- The Tent Peg. Toronto: McClelland and Stewart, 1981.
- No Fixed Address. Toronto: McClelland and Stewart, 1986.
- Places Far From Ellesmere: a geografictione. Red Deer, AB: Red Deer, 1990.
- Restlessness. Red Deer, AB: Red Deer, 1998.

=== Criticism ===
- In Visible Ink: Crypto-frictions. Edmonton: NeWest, 1991.
- A Frozen Tongue: Selected Criticism and Ficto-Criticism. Mundelstrup, Denmark: Dangeroo, 1992.

=== Non-fiction ===
- Mavericks: An Incorrigible History of Alberta. Toronto: Penguin, 2001.
- Audacious and Adamant: The Story of Maverick Alberta. Toronto: KeyPorter, 2007.
- In This Place Calgary: 2004-2011. Photographs by George Webber, words by Aritha van Herk. Calgary: Frontenac House, 2011.
- Prairie Gothic. Photographs by George Webber, words by Aritha van Herk. Victoria: Rocky Mountain Books, 2012.
- The Age of Audacity: 50 Years of Ambition and Adventure at Calgary's Own University. Calgary: University of Calgary Press, 2016.

=== Prose-Poetry ===
- Stampede and the Westness of the West. 2016

=== Books edited ===
- More Stories From Western Canada. Toronto: Macmillan, 1980 (with Ruby Wiebe).
- West of Fiction. Edmonton: NeWest, 1983 (with Leah Flater & Ruby Wiebe).
- Alberta Re/Bound. Edmonton: NeWest, 1990.
- Boundless Alberta. Edmonton: NeWest, 1993.
- Due West. Coteau, NeWest and Turnstone, 1996 (with Wayne Tefs and Geoffrey Ursell).
- Building Liberty: Canada and World Peace, 1945-2005. Groningen, the Netherlands: Barkhuis, 2005 (with Conny Steenman-Marcusse).
- Carol Shields: Evocation and Echo. Groningen: Barkuis Publishing, 2009 (with Conny Steenman-Marcusse).
- The Canadian Postmodern: A Study of Contemporary Canadian Fiction. Oxford: Oxford University Press, 2012 (with Linda Hutcheon).
- The Domestic Space Reader. Toronto: University of Toronto Press, 2012 (with Chiara Briganti and Kathy Mezei).
- The Worlds of Carol Shields. Otaawa: University of Ottawa Press, 2014 (with David Staines).
