= Desmond Pacey =

Canadian literary critic & author (1917–1975)

Desmond Pacey FRSC
- Born: William Cyril Desmond Pacey; May 1, 1917; Dunedin, New Zealand
- Died: July 4, 1975 (aged 58); Fredericton, New Brunswick, Canada

Academic work
- Era: 1940–1975
- Main interests: Canadian history, Canadian Literature
- Notable works: Creative Writing in Canada, Ten Canadian Poets
- Influenced: Fred Cogswell

William Cyril Desmond Pacey FRSC (May 1, 1917 – July 4, 1975) was a pioneer of Canadian literary criticism. He was also a notable author of verse and short fiction and a long-time university administrator. He was awarded the Lorne Pierce Medal by the Royal Society of Canada in 1972.

As chair of the University of New Brunswick English Department in the 1940s, Pacey worked closely with Roy Daniels of the University of British Columbia to initiate English PhD programs at both universities, effectively breaking the academic stranglehold the University of Toronto held on higher education in Canadian universities.

== Biography ==
=== Early life, education, and career ===
Pacey was born in 1917 in Dunedin, New Zealand to parents William and Mary. After his father was killed during the First World War, Pacey and his mother moved to England; in 1931, Mary married a Canadian farmer, and the family emigrated to Ontario, Canada.

As an undergraduate, Pacey attended the University of Toronto, where he earned a degree in English and Philosophy. Upon graduation, he enrolled at Cambridge, where he was awarded his doctorate in 1941.

Pacey began his academic career in 1940 when he accepted a post at Brandon University in Manitoba. In 1944, he accepted a position of chair of the Department of English at the University of New Brunswick, where he worked in various professorial and administrative capacities – as dean of graduate studies, as academic vice president, and as acting president – until his death in 1975.

Pacey published important work on Frederick Philip Grove, Sir Charles G.D. Roberts, and Ethel Wilson, among others. He worked as a contributing editor for Carl Klinck's landmark Literary History of Canada.

=== Legacy and honors ===
Pacey was awarded honorary degrees from the University of New Brunswick and from Mount Allison University in 1973. UNB launched its annual W.C. Desmond Pacey Memorial Lecture in 1980/81, at which time the first lecture was given by Northrop Frye. Most recently, in 2011/12, the lecture was given by Tony Penikett, two-term Premier of the Yukon.

According to Philip Kokotalio, Pacey is often "regarded as a champion of social and environmental realism in Canada." The critic Frank Davey has argued that Pacey "demanded that the Canadian writer demonstrate his freedom from colonial mimicry by attending to Canadian experience."

== Selected works ==
=== Academic ===
- Frederick Philip Grove. Toronto: Ryerson, 1945
- Creative Writing in Canada: A Short History of English-Canadian Literature. Toronto: Ryerson, 1945
- Ten Canadian Poets: A Group of Biographical and Critical Essays. Toronto: Ryerson, 1958
- Ethel Wilson. New York: Twayne, 1968
- Essays in Canadian Criticism, 1938–1968. Toronto: Ryerson, 1969

=== Creative ===
- Hippity Hobo and the Bee and Other Verses for Children. Fredericton: Brunswick, 1952
- The Picnic, and Other Stories. Toronto: Ryerson, 1958
