= Joyce Marshall =

Canadian writer and translator

- Born: November 28, 1913; Montréal
- Died: October 22, 2005 (aged 91); Toronto
- Occupations: novelist, translator
- Writing career
- Language: English

Joyce Marshall (November 28, 1913 – October 22, 2005) was a Canadian writer and translator.

== Biography ==
The daughter of William Marshall and Joyce Chambers, she was born in Montreal and was educated there and in the Eastern Townships. She went on to earn a BA from McGill University, where she was the first woman to become a senior editor for The McGill Daily. Although she continued to improve her fluency in French, Marshall did not feel at home in the conservative Quebec of the Duplessis era and moved to Toronto in 1937. She was a reader and editor for the CBC Radio programs Canadian short stories and Anthologies, where many of her short stories first aired. She also was writer-in-residence at Trent University.

She had begun writing at a young age and published her first novel Presently Tomorrow in 1946. It was followed by Lovers and Strangers in 1957. Marshall also published a number of collections of short stories: A Private Place (1975), Any Time at All and Other Stories (1993) and Blood and Bone/En chair et en os (1995). Her stories have been included in various anthologies.

Marshall translated the works of Gabrielle Roy and Marie of the Incarnation into English. She received a Canada Council Prize for translation in 1976. She was a founding member of the Literary Translators' Association of Canada. Her literary reviews and essays have appeared in the Tamarack Review, Books in Canada and Canadian Literature. She also contributed to the first edition of The Oxford Companion to Canadian Literature.

She died in Toronto at the age of 91.
