= Alec Lucas =

Welsh footballer

Personal information
- Full name: Alec Leroy Lucas
- Date of birth: 1 December 1945 (age 80)
- Place of birth: Wrexham, Wales
- Position: Full-back

Youth career
- Queens Park Rangers

Senior career*
Years	Team	Apps	(Gls)
- Bradley Rangers
1965–1967	Wrexham	55	(0)
- Bangor City
- * Club domestic league appearances and goals

Alec Leroy Lucas (born 1 December 1945) is a Welsh former professional footballer who played as a full-back. He made appearances in the English Football League with Wrexham. He also played for Bradley Rangers and Bangor City.
