= W. H. New =

Canadian poet and literary critic (born 1938)

William Herbert New (born March 28, 1938) is a Canadian poet and literary critic.

== Early life and education ==
New was born in Vancouver, British Columbia. He was educated at John Oliver Secondary School, where he received one of the top matriculation exam scores in British Columbia in 1956. He also attended the University of British Columbia and the University of Leeds.

== Career ==
He taught English literature at the University of British Columbia from 1965 to 2003, where he was also the assistant dean of graduate studies from 1975 to 1977, and an acting head of the English department. He also was an associate in 1971 at the University of Cambridge's Clare Hall.

On October 5, 2006, he was appointed an Officer of the Order of Canada and was invested October 26, 2007.

For 29 years, he held editorial positions at Canadian Literature and, in 2004, was made editor emeritus.

== Personal life ==
He is the son of John New and Edith New (nee Littlejohn).

On July 6, 1967, New married Margaret Elizabeth Frances Ebbs-Canavan.

He is the father of actor Peter New.

== Selected works ==
=== Criticism ===
- Malcolm Lowry — 1971
- Articulating West — 1972
- Among Worlds: An Introduction to Modern Commonwealth and South African Fiction — 1975
- Malcolm Lowry: A Reference Guide — 1978
- Dreams of Speech and Violence: The Art of the Short Story in Canada and New Zealand — 1987
- A History of Canadian Literature — 1989
- Land Sliding: Imagining Space, Presence & Power in Canadian Writing — 1997
- Reading Mansfield and Metaphors of Form — 1999
- The Encyclopedia of Canadian Literature — 2002
- Grandchild of Empire: About Irony, Mainly in the Commonwealth — 2003

=== Poetry ===
- Science Lessons — 1996
- Raucous — 1999
- Stone | Rain — 2001
- Riverbook and Ocean — 2002
- Night Room — 2003
- Underwood Log — 2004
- Touching Ecuador — 2006
- Along a Snake Fence Riding — 2007
- The Rope-maker's Tale — 2009
- YVR — 2011
- New & Selected Poems — 2015
- Neighbors — 2017
- In the Plague Year — 2021
- Inventing What We Need to Know — 2025

=== Children's books ===
- Vanilla Gorilla — 1998
- Llamas in the Laundry — 2002
- Dream Helmet — 2005
- The Year I Was Grounded — 2008
- Sam Swallow and the Riddleworld League — 2013

=== Anthologies edited ===
- Four Hemispheres — 1971
- Voice and Vision — 1972 (with Jack Hodgins)
- Dramatists in Canada — 1972
- Critical Writings on Commonwealth Literatures: A Bibliography — 1975
- Modern Stories in English — 1975 (with H.J. Rosengarten)
- Modern Canadian Essays — 1976
- Margaret Laurence: The Writer and Her Critics — 1977
- A Political Art: Essays and Images in Honour of George Woodcock — 1978
- Active Voice — 1980 (with W.E. Messenger)
- The Active Stylist — 1981 (with W.E. Messenger)
- A 20th Century Anthology — 1984
- Canadian Short Fiction — 1986
- Canadian Writers Since 1960 — 1986
- Canadian Writers Since 1960, 2nd series — 1987
- Canadian Writers 1920-1959 — 1988
- Canadian Writers 1920-1959, 2nd series — 1989
- Native Writers and Canadian Writing — 1990
- Canadian Writers Before 1890 — 1990
- Canadian Writers 1890-1920 — 1990
- Inside the Poem — 1992
- Literature in English — 1993 (with W.E. Messenger)
- Encyclopedia of Literature in Canada — 2002
- Tropes and Territories: Short Fiction, Postcolonial Readings, Canadian Writings in Context — 2007 (with Marta Dvorak)
- From a Speaking Place: Writings from the First Fifty Years of Canadian Literature — 2009 (with Réjean Beaudoin, Susan Fisher, Iain Higgins, Eva-Marie Kröller and Laurie Ricou)

== Honours and awards ==
- Fellow of the Royal Society of Canada — 1986
- Confederation of University Faculty Associations of BC Paz Buttedahl Career Achievement Award — 2001
- Lorne Pierce Medal — 2004
- Officer of the Order of Canada — 2006
- Mayor's Award for Literary Arts in Vancouver — 2012
- City of Vancouver Book Award — 2012
- George Woodcock Lifetime Achievement Award — 2013
