= David Staines =

Canadian literary critic

David McKenzie Staines, CM OOnt (born August 8, 1946) is a Canadian literary critic, university professor, writer, and editor.

Staines was born in Toronto, Ontario, and studied at the University of Toronto, where he obtained a BA in 1967, and at Harvard University, where he obtained an MA in 1968 and a PhD in 1973. Staines graduated from St. Michael's College School, a private academic high school in Toronto.

After a career that saw him teach at Harvard, the University of Prince Edward Island, Smith College, Mount Holyoke College, and UMass Amherst, Staines became a professor of English at the University of Ottawa. Staines specializes in three particular areas: medieval, Victorian and Canadian literatures, with particular interest in the relationship between literature and its social context.

In his studies of medieval literature Staines has examined the evolution of romance traditions, which resulted in a landmark new translation of the classic tales of Chrétien de Troyes: The Complete Romances of Chrétien de Troyes (1990). He is also an authority on Arthurian legends.

Staines is particularly active in the field of Canadian studies, for example, as editor of the scholarly Journal of Canadian Poetry since 1986 and general editor of McClelland and Stewart's New Canadian Library series since 1988. He has published a number of major essay collections, including The Canadian Imagination (1977), a book that introduced Canadian literature and literary criticism to an American audience, as well as studies on Morley Callaghan and Stephen Leacock.

He is also interested in farming, in particular, the raising of livestock, such as donkeys.

Staines was awarded the Royal Society of Canada's Lorne Pierce Medal in 1998. He was also member of the jury for the Giller Prize in 1994, 1995, 1996 and 2003. In 2005, he was made a Fellow of the Royal Society of Canada. In 2011, he was awarded the Order of Ontario for helping to establish the Giller Prize, Canada's highest award for fiction, and the Charles Taylor Prize for Literary Non-Fiction. In 2011, he was made a Member of the Order of Canada "for his contributions as a champion of Canadian literature and mentor to young writers."
