= Ethel Wilson =

Canadian writer (1888–1980)

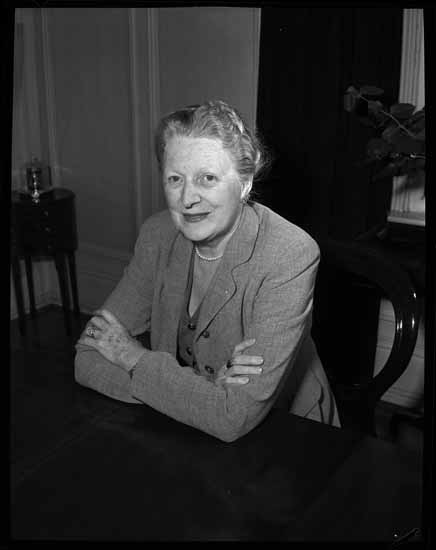
- Born: Ethel Davis Bryant; January 20, 1888; Port Elizabeth, Cape Colony
- Died: December 22, 1980 (aged 92); Vancouver, B.C.
- Occupation: Writer (novelist)
- Spouse: Wallace Wilson
- Writing career
- Period: 20th century
- Genre: fiction

Ethel Davis Wilson, OC (January 20, 1888 – December 22, 1980) was a Canadian writer of short stories and novels. Her works include Hetty Dorval (1947), The Innocent Traveller (1949), Swamp Angel (1954) and Mrs Golightly and Other Stories (1961).

== Life ==
Wilson was born in 1888 in Port Elizabeth, Cape Colony, to Robert and Lila Bryant. She moved to England with her father in 1890 following the death of her mother. In 1898, after the death of her father, she was taken to live with her maternal grandmother, Annie Malkin in Vancouver, British Columbia, but moved back to England at fourteen to attend a school for Methodist ministers' daughters. Ethel eventually returned to Vancouver and received her teacher's certificate a year later in 1907, and for thirteen years taught in Vancouver elementary schools. In 1921 she married Wallace Wilson, President of the Canadian Medical Association and professor of medical ethics at the University of British Columbia. Wilson died in 1980 after suffering a series of small strokes.

== Writing career ==
Ethel Wilson's first published work appeared in 1919 as The Surprising Adventures of Peter, a children's serial that ran in the Vancouver Daily Province. Ethel preferred to ignore this debut, and instead later claimed her publishing career began in the 1930s while in the car as her husband made medical calls. It was in this decade that Wilson published a few short stories and began a series of fictionalized family reminiscences which were later published as The Innocent Traveller (1949). Her first published novel, Hetty Dorval, appeared in 1947, and was followed, seven years later by Swamp Angel (1954), generally thought of as her most accomplished work. Her final book was Mrs Golightly and Other Stories (1961).

Wilson is known as one of the first Canadian writers to depict the natural beauty of British Columbia. She wrote often of places in British Columbia that were important to her and was able to detail the ruggedness and magic of the landscape. Yet in 1958 at the University of British Columbia, in a talk entitled "An Approach to Some Novels," Wilson stated that there was no school of 'Canadian novel-writing,' nor was one necessary. In her opinion, there were novels written in Canada by Canadians, but these were written with no prescribed formula for what would make a 'Canadian novel.' While Wilson was not overly patriotic in her writing, she did find environment to be very important to her characters. In fact, the connection to place is central in her writings to exploring relationships and the way people react to life. Wilson's characters are observed in relation to the environment. In Love and Salt Water, she states that "the formidable power of geography determines the character and performance of a people."

Wilson is the subject of one work of criticism, Ethel Wilson by Desmond Pacey, and two biographies, The Other Side of Silence: A Life of Ethel Wilson by Mary McAlpine and Ethel Wilson: A Critical Biography.

== Works ==
- Hetty Dorval — 1947 (Republished in 2005 by Persephone Books)
- The Innocent Traveller — 1949
- The Equations of Love (Tuesday and Wednesday; Lilly's Story) — 1952
- Swamp Angel — 1954
- Love and Salt Water — 1956, in German: Liebe und Salzwasser, Hamburg 2026, ISBN 978-3-86648-751-2
- Mrs. Golightly and Other Stories — 1961
- Ethel Wilson: Stories, Essays, and Letters — 1987 (edited by David Stouck)

== Awards and recognition ==
For her contribution to Canadian literature, Wilson was awarded one of the Governor General's Literary Awards in 1961 and the Royal Society of Canada's Lorne Pierce Medal in 1964. In 1970, she was made an Officer of the Order of Canada "for her contribution to Canadian literature".

The Ethel Wilson Fiction Prize is named in her honour.
