= Gordon Roper =

Canadian academic

Gordon Roper was chair of English at Trinity College, a member of the graduate faculty at the university, a senior founder of Massey College and responsible as Senior Fellow Emeritus for developing the Massey College library, later renamed the Robertson Davies library. Northrop Frye and E. J. Pratt were his friends. Governor General Adrienne Clarkson was a former student.
