= Henry Kreisel =

Canadian writer (1922–1991)

Henry Kreisel OC (June 5, 1922 – April 22, 1991) was a Canadian writer of novels and essays and a professor of literature.

Kreisel was born in Vienna, Austria to a Polish-born mother and a Romanian-born father. The family, which was Jewish, managed to reach Britain just before the Second World War, but, like many other German-speaking refugees, they were declared enemy aliens after the war began.

In 1940 Kreisel was relocated to Canada. He lived on a farm in New Brunswick until 1941. It was there that he began his career as a writer, deciding to write in English and modelling himself on the bilingual author Joseph Conrad. He wanted to emancipate himself from the German language, which was the language of Hitler. After Canada decided to release the refugees from the camps they had been assigned to, Kreisel decided to pursue his dream of writing and was educated at the University of Toronto, BA, 1946, MA, 1947. Kreisel earned a PhD from the University of London in 1954.

Kreisel became one of the first Jewish writers to write about Jewish-Canadian issues. In 1947 he began teaching at the University of Alberta in Edmonton, later becoming Head of the English Department and then VP Academic. He retired in 1987 as Professor of Comparative Literature. His time spent in Western Canada is reflected in some of his short stories and his essay "The Prairie: A State of Mind", a frequently anthologized discussion of Western Canadian regionalism.

He was made an Officer of the Order of Canada in 1987. In order to honour him, the University of Alberta's Canadian Literature Centre in Edmonton organizes an annual Henry Kreisel Memorial Lecture.

An inventory of his papers is at the University of Manitoba Archives & Special Collections.

== Publications ==
- The Rich Man, 1948; reed. 1961, 2006
- The Betrayal, 1964
  - The Betrayal, play, 1965 Canadian Broadcasting Corporation TV production
- The Prairie. A State of Mind, 1968 (= Transactions of the Royal Society of Canada, Vol. 6)
- The Almost Meeting, 1981
- Another Country: Writings by and about Henry Kreisel. Shirley Neumann ed., Edmonton 1985 (including: Diary of an internment, 1940 – 1941)
- Complete bibliography at athabascau.ca (and some essays about him)
