= Douglas Killam =

Canadian scholar of African literature (1930–2020)

- Born: Gordon Douglas Killam; August 26, 1930
- Died: November 17, 2020 (aged 81)
- Education: University College London
- Occupation: Scholar of African literature

Gordon Douglas Killam (August 26, 1930 – November 17, 2020), known to friends as Doug Killam, was a Canadian scholar of African literature.

== Life ==
Killam was born on August 26, 1930, the son of Harry and Margaret Killam of British Columbia. After working as a producer with CBC Television, he gained a PhD from University College London in 1964 and moved into academia. He travelled and taught in Africa, in Sierra Leone, Nigeria and Tanzania. He also taught at Canadian universities, including the University of British Columbia (UBC), the University of Alberta and University of Acadia. At the University of York he was the Founding Master of Bethune College. At the University of Guelph, he made the Department of English a recognised centre of post-colonial studies.

Predeceased by his wife Shelagh (née Anderson) in 1996, Killam died on November 17, 2020, of Parkinson's disease.

== Works ==
- Africa in English Fiction, 1874-1939. Ibadan: Ibadan University Press, 1968.
- The Novels of Chinua Achebe. New York: Africana Pub. Corp., 1969.
- (ed.) African Writers on African Writing. Evanston: Northwestern University Press, 1972.
- An Introduction to the Writings of Ngugi. London: Heinemann Educational, 1980.
- The Writing of East and Central Africa. London: Heinemann, 1984.
- Critical Perspectives on Ngugi wa Thiong'o. Washington: Three Continents Press, 1984.
- (ed. with Ruth Riwe) The Companion to African Literatures. Indiana University Press, 1999.
- Literature of Africa. Westport, Conn.: Greenwood Press, 2004.
- (ed. with Alicia L. Kerfoot) Student Encyclopedia of African Literature. Westport, Conn.: Greenwood Press, 2007.
