= Archibald MacMechan =

Canadian academic (1862–1933)

Archibald McKellar MacMechan FRSC
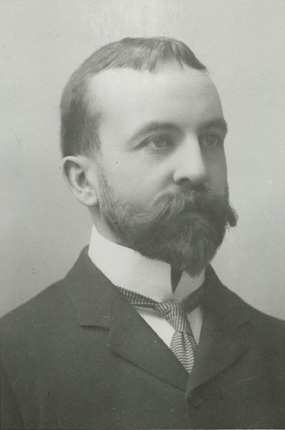
- MacMechan in 1897
- Born: June 21, 1862; Berlin, Canada West
- Died: August 7, 1933 (aged 71)
- Awards: Lorne Pierce Medal (1932)

Archibald McKellar MacMechan FRSC (June 21, 1862 – 7 August 1933) was a Canadian academic at Dalhousie University and writer. His works deal mainly with Nova Scotia and its history. The Halifax Disaster (Explosion) was an official history of the Halifax Explosion.

Born in Berlin, Ontario (now known as Kitchener), he is credited with reviving Herman Melville's reputation in North America. He had written to Melville in 1889, right at the end of his life.

He was awarded the Lorne Pierce Medal in 1932.

He was a long-term member of the Royal Nova Scotia Historical Society.

== Works ==
- Concerning The Oldest English Literature, (1889)
- The Relation Of Hans Sachs To The Decameron, (1889)
- Vergil, (1897)
- William Greenwood, (1914)
- The Winning Of Popular Government, (1915)
- Three Sea Songs: Nova Scotia Chapbook, (1919)
- The Sagas of the Sea, (1923)
- Old Province Tales..., (1924)
- Head-Waters Of Canadian Literature, (1924)
- The Book of Ultima Thule, (1927)
- There Go the Ships, (1928)
- The Centenary Of Haliburton's 'Nova Scotia', (1930)
- Red Snow On Grand Pré, (1931)
- Late Harvest, (1934)
- The Halifax Disaster (Explosion), (1978)
