= Carl Klinck =

Canadian literary historian

Carl Klinck OC FRSC
- Born: Carl Frederick Klinck; March 24, 1908; Elmira, Ontario
- Died: October 22, 1990 (aged 82); London, Ontario, Canada
- Occupations: Literary historian and academic

Carl Frederick Klinck OC FRSC (March 24, 1908 – October 22, 1990) was a Canadian literary historian and academic.

Born in Elmira, Ontario, he received a BA from Waterloo College (now Wilfrid Laurier University) in 1927, and a MA and PhD from Columbia University in 1929 and 1943. In 1928, he became an associate professor of English at Waterloo College, becoming head of the department in 1940. From 1943 to 1948, he was the Dean of Waterloo College. He was the editor of Literary History of Canada in 1965.

In 1973, he was made an Officer of the Order of Canada. In 1978, was awarded the Royal Society of Canada's Lorne Pierce Medal.
