= John Errington Moss =

Canadian author (born 1940)

John Errington Moss (born February 7, 1940) is a Canadian author. Notable for the Quin and Morgan novels that he began after teaching for many years at the University of Ottawa, he has lectured on Canadian literature in Europe, the United States, Japan, Greenland, and the Canary Islands. He is a Fellow of the Royal Society of Canada.

== Life ==
Born in Galt, Ontario, Canada, Moss is the second of five children of George Francis Moss and Mary Margaret Clare, both of Preston, now Cambridge, Ontario. He grew up in the village of Blair until age eleven when the family left Waterloo County where their roots go back to its earliest settlement in 1802. After a period in Clarkson and Port Credit, near Toronto, he returned to Preston to complete his secondary education. He received a Bachelor of Arts degree from Huron College in 1961, a Master of Arts degree from The University of Western Ontario in 1969, a Master of Philosophy degree from the University of Waterloo in 1970, and a Doctor of Philosophy from the University of New Brunswick in 1973, where he was co-founder with David Arnason of the Journal of Canadian Fiction and wrote his first critical book, Patterns of Isolation (McClelland and Stewart, 1974).

In 1965 he married Virginia Lavin and they had two children, Julia Clare Zillah and Laura Frances Errington. Divorced after a lengthy separation, he married Beverley Haun and they had one child, Jack Austen (1999, deceased). He and his wife live in Peterborough, Ontario.

== Career ==
After working in a variety of casual jobs, as an archivist, and studio director for the Canadian Broadcasting Corporation, along with travel adventures such as working as a stand-in for Peter O'Toole in Lawrence of Arabia and hitchhiking through Scandinavia in mid-winter, he returned to graduate school and settled into an academic career at a series of universities, from Concordia University in Montreal to the University of British Columbia and Queen's in Kingston, and finally the University of Ottawa for a period of almost three decades, before retiring as professor emeritus in 2005.

In 2005 he was elected as a Fellow of the Academy of Humanities and Social Sciences of The Royal Society of Canada. His citation stated:

John Moss has been a major force in shaping Canadian literary criticism and in advancing the understanding of Canada's literary culture. He has authored or edited 24 books and has written over two hundred chapters, articles, papers, review articles, and reviews. Among his most influential books are Patterns of Isolation (1974), A Reader's Guide to the Canadian Novel (1981; rpt 1987), Enduring Dreams (1994), The Paradox of Meaning (1999), and Being Fiction (2001). Between 1973 and the present Moss has contributed to the crucial transformations that have occurred in the history of our critical thought.

== The Quin and Morgan Mysteries ==
The stories are set in Toronto, early in the new millennium. After ten years working in Homicide together, detectives Miranda Quin and David Morgan are a virtual couple who could not possibly live together, yet are incomplete being apart.

== Works ==
- To Set the Stone Trembling. 2022
- Surviving the End of the World. 2019.
- Lindstrom Unbound. 2019.
- Lindstrom's Progress. 2018.
- Lindstrom Alone. 2018.
- The Jewel in a Cave. 2018.
- The Girl in a Coma. 2016.
- Blood Wine. A Quin and Morgan Mystery. 2014.
- The Dead Scholar. A Quin and Morgan Mystery. 2013.
- Reluctant Dead. A Quin and Morgan Mystery. 2011.
- Grave Doubts. A Quin and Morgan Mystery. 2009.
- Still Waters. A Quin and Morgan Mystery. 2008.
- Being Fiction. Short Stories. 2001.
- Invisible among the Ruins: Field Notes of a Canadian in Ireland. 2000.
- The Paradox of Meaning: Cultural Poetics and Critical Fictions. 1999.
- Enduring Dreams: An Exploration of Arctic Landscape. 1994.
- Arctic Landscape and the Metaphysics of Geography. 1992.
- A Reader's Guide to the Canadian Novel: Second Edition. 1987.
- Invisible in the House of Mirrors. 1984.
- Bellrock. 1983.
- A Reader's Guide to the Canadian Novel. 1981.
- The Ancestral Present: Sex and Violence in the Canadian Novel. 1977.
- Patterns of Isolation. 1974.

== Books edited ==
- Margaret Atwood: The Open Eye. Edited with a prefatory essay. 2006.
- At the Speed of Light There Is Only Illumination: A Reappraisal of Marshall McLuhan, Edited with an Introduction. 2004.
- Wacousta. Canadian Critical Edition. Edited with an Introduction. 1998.
- Echoing Silence: Essays on Arctic Narrative. Edited with an Introduction. 1997.
- From the Heart of the Heartland. Sinclair Ross: A Reappraisal. Edited with an Introduction. 1992.
- Future Indicative: Literary Theory and Canadian Literature. Edited with an Introductory Essay. 1987.
- Present Tense. Edited with an Introductory Essay. 1985.
- Beginnings: Revised Edition. Edited with an Introductory Essay. 1984.
- Modern Times. Edited with an Introductory Essay. 1982
- Beginnings. Edited with an Introductory Essay. 1980.
- Here and Now. Edited with an Introductory Essay.1978.
- Raymond Knister: Poems, Stories and Essays. Edited by David Arnason, John Moss and John Robert Sorfleet. 1975.
- Early Canadian Prose. Edited with a Preface. Book Edition, Journal of Canadian Fiction. 1973.

== Periodicals and series ==
- Canadian Critical Editions. 1993–2006.
- Northern Review. Guest Editor, Special Issue: Landscape Writing Landscape. 1998.
- Arctic Circle. Contributing Editor. 1991 to 1994.
- University of Ottawa Canadian Short Stories Series. General Editor, 1988 to 1996.
- Weber-Malakhov Polar Expedition Newsletter. Editor, 1991–92.
- Journal of Canadian Fiction. Editor; Managing Editor. 1971–76.
- Folio. Poetry Editor. University of Western Ontario, 1959–61.
