= Frederick Philip Grove =

German-born Canadian novelist and translator (1879–1948)

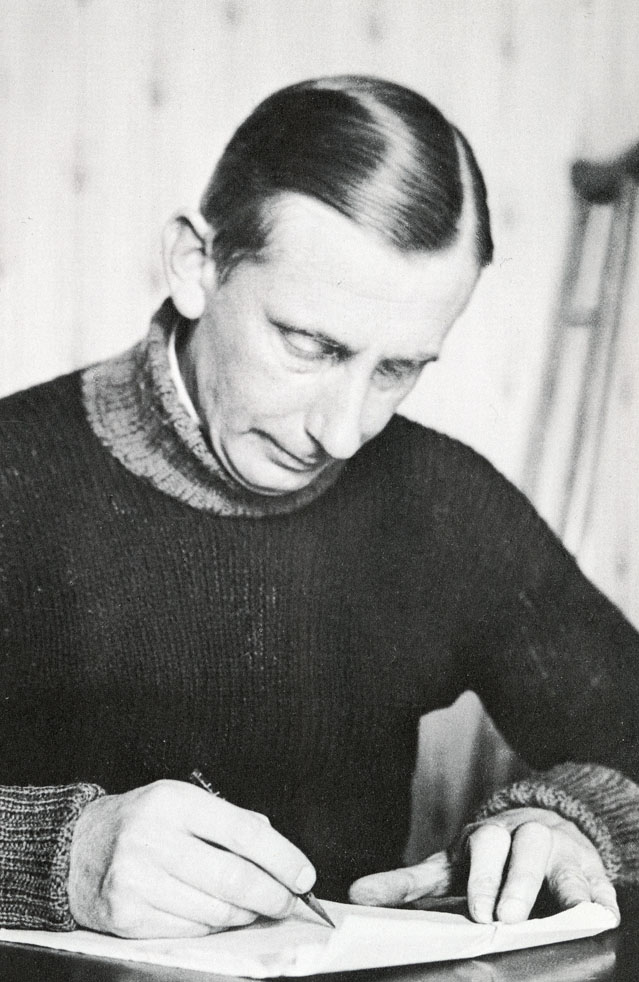
Grove circa 1921

Frederick Philip Grove (February 14, 1879 – September 9, 1948) was a German-born Canadian novelist and translator.

He was a prolific translator in Germany, working under his original name Felix Paul Greve and posing as a dandy, before he left Berlin to start a new life in North America in late July 1909. Settling in Manitoba, Canada, in 1912, he became a well known Canadian fiction writer exploring Western prairie pioneer life in vibrant multi-cultural communities. A bigamist, Grove constructed his entire life as an intricate web of fact and fiction. He died in 1948 on his estate in Simcoe, Ontario, where he had resided since 1930.

== Life ==
=== Early life in Europe ===
Grove was born Felix Paul Greve in Radomno, West Prussia, but was brought up in Hamburg where he graduated with the Abitur from the Gymnasium Johanneum in 1898. After studying classical languages and archaeology in Bonn, he became a prolific translator of world literature and a member of Stefan George's homoerotic group, the George-Kreis, around 1900. During his year in Munich, he befriended Karl Wolfskehl, and briefly shared an address with Thomas Mann at the Pension Gisels from August to September 1902. In early 1903, amidst scandal, he settled in Palermo, Italy, with Else Plötz Endell, the wife of renowned architect August Endell (she would later become Baroness Elsa von Freytag-Loringhoven). In his 1946 autobiography In Search of Myself, Grove suggests that despite the homoerotic context of his work up to late 1902, his first sexual encounter with Elsa determined his sexuality: "If I had not always been so, I had become definitely, finally heterosexual."

Grove's rising career took a dramatic downward spin that followed his alliance with Else. Unable to repay loans made by his intimate friend and wealthy patron Herman Kilian, he was promptly charged and convicted of fraud; from 1903–04, he served a deeply humiliating one-year sentence in the penitentiary in Bonn, leaving his reputation destroyed. Much suggests that Kilian (whose Anglo-German ancestry Grove would later appropriate for himself in his Canadian autobiographies) had acted from motives of jealousy. While in prison, Grove composed his first novel, Fanny Essler, a thinly veiled roman à clef about Else's sexual adventures, including her marriage with August Endell. The novel, which moreover poked fun at the Stefan George circle, prompted a complete break from George's coterie. From 1904 to early 1906, the pair lived in voluntary exile, first in Wollerau, Switzerland, then in Paris-Plage, France, from where Grove paid H. G. Wells a few visits in his Sandhurst villa just across the Channel. In 1906, the couple returned to Berlin, where they were married on August 22, 1907.

=== Life in North America ===
By 1909, Grove was again in deep financial trouble, having double-sold his latest German translation, Jonathan Swift's Prosa Werke in four volumes. With his wife's help, he staged his suicide and departed for North America on the White Star Line's SS Megantic in late July 1909. His wife joined him a year later in Pittsburgh, and the couple farmed near Sparta, Kentucky, until 1911, when Grove left her permanently. She modeled for artists in nearby Cincinnati, and later became well known in New York dada circles as the Baroness Elsa von Freytag-Loringhoven after her marriage in 1913 to the German Baron Leopold von Freytag-Loringhoven. Grove moved west and stayed on a large Bonanza farm near Fargo (based on the Amenia & Sharon Land Company) in the late summer of 1912.

In 1912, Grove, whose legal name was still Greve, arrived in Manitoba, Canada, where he changed his name to Frederick Philip Grove and married a young schoolteacher, Catherine Wiens, on August 2, 1914. There are no records of a divorce from his first wife, who details in her memoir that he had suddenly deserted her. He first taught in rural areas, such as Haskett, Winkler, Virden, and Gladstone, but after settling in Rapid City in 1922, he devoted himself entirely to his writing career. In 1927, Grove and his wife suffered the devastating loss of their only child, Phyllis May, shortly before her twelfth birthday. In 1928–29, Grove went on three coast-to-coast lecture tours, before the couple moved to Ontario in the fall of 1929. There, their son, Arthur Leonard Grove, was born on October 14, 1930. Grove briefly became an editor with Graphic Publishers, who had published his first autobiographical novel, A Search for America, in 1927, before moving to Simcoe, Ontario. From there, he continued to write despite increasing ill-health, until he suffered a crippling stroke in late 1946. While in Simcoe, he ran for the Co-operative Commonwealth Federation (CCF) in the 1943 Ontario general election.

== Work and legacy ==
Frederick Philip Grove is best known for exploring the Canadian West and its pioneer landscape in non-fiction and semi-fictionalized works such as Over Prairie Trails, Settlers of the Marsh, A Search for America, and In Search of Myself. "Grove gave a voice to the land-hungry pioneers of the West, but also cloaked his past in the ostensible honesty of the prairie pioneer novel."

His literary works focus on realism and naturalism, depicting pioneer life in Western Canada. His novels frequently feature recurring character archetypes, such as Niels Lindstedt, a Swedish immigrant pioneer in Settlers of the Marsh (1925); Abe Spalding, a single-minded pioneer in Fruits of the Earth (1933); and John Elliot, an aging patriarch in Our Daily Bread (1928). In his writing, male patriarchs are typically portrayed as strong yet tragic figures who struggle to articulate their feelings or alter their circumstances. In contrast, female characters are depicted as adaptable, articulate, and often assuming non-traditional roles. Broadly, his fiction documents the multicultural immigrant communities of the Canadian prairie during the early 20th century.

His novels are populated with a range of Swedish, German, French, Icelandic, and Ukrainian immigrants, offering a vibrant multi-culturalism as a vision for Canada's social fabric. As an author he assumed the role of "spokesperson for the young Canadian nation," who cleverly staged himself as "an adopted son [in Canada]" in lecture tours, essays, and advertisements.

Grove also experimented with forms of modernism, both in staging fictionalized selves in his autobiographical fiction, and in experimenting with unreliable narrators and time shifts in his late novel, The Master of the Mill.

== Grove's Archives ==
Grove's papers were acquired by the University of Manitoba (UM) from his widow Catherine Wiens in the early 1960s. This source collection fills 24 archival boxes, and contains many published and unpublished manuscripts, typescripts, and notebooks, as well as six German poems in Grove's hand—one of which is obviously related to Greve's published poem "Erster Sturm" (1907). – A voluminous Finding Aid for Mss 2 was prepared in 1972. [see the UM catalogue description of the collection's contents]

Since the mid-1990s, the UM's FPG (Greve/Grove) & FrL Collections Website has made available numerous big & small e-texts by/about FPG and the Baroness von Freytag-Loringhoven (FrL), as well as bio-bibliographical information, notably:

- A list of the FPG (Greve/Grove) Sources & Documents held at the University of Manitoba Archives
- A description of the FPG (Greve/Grove) Sources & Documents held at the University of Manitoba Archives (based on a promotional brochure distributed at the 1996 Learneds Societies' Convention in Ottawa)
- A brief history of UMA e-Projects

Related source and research collections

In addition to the central Grove Collection Mss 2, the University of Manitoba Grove Archives have the following sources and research collections:

Professor D. O. Spettigue's Research Papers (Mss 57, 1985 & 1995, 16 Boxes) document the sensational discovery of the FPG identity in 1971. They also include three German poems and two letters Thomas Mann sent to Grove from Princeton in 1939. – An additional Spettigue cluster was acquired in January 1995. It included Greve's correspondence with André Gide, Karl Wolfskehl, O. A. H. Schmitz, and contained materials related to the English translation of Greve's 1905 novel Fanny Essler. – Thanks to professors Spettigue and Hjartarson's capital finding in ca. 1987 that Greve's Else became the New York dadaist Baroness von Freytag-Loringhoven (FrL), the Spettigue Collections' curator Gaby Divay was able to obtain, in early 1991, FrL's autobiography in typescript and manuscript form from the University of Maryland in exchange for a Fanny Essler microfilm.

Professor Margaret Stobie's Collection (Mss 13, 2 Boxes) documents Grove's early teaching activities in Manitoba, and contains Grove's first Canadian publication, the sprawling article "Rousseau als Erzieher" in the German newspaper Der Nordwesten (Nov./Dec. 1914).

Dr. Gaby Divay's Research Papers (Mss 12, 8 Boxes, ongoing) contain many documents pertaining to her FPG & FrL discoveries such as:

- six manuscript poems Greve submitted in 1902 for publication in Stefan George's prestigious Blätter für die Kunst, and six sonnets he translated from Dante's Vita Nuova in 1898 (both clusters were found in the Stefan-George-Archiv, Stuttgart, in May 1990, copies courtesy of Dr. Ute Oelmann)
- Claude Martin's 1976 masterly edition of Gide's 1904 Conversation avec un allemand (with two confessional letters by Greve)
- Centennial e-Ed. in Germ & Eng. of seven poems published in 1904/5 under the joint pseud. 'Fanny Essler' in Die Freistatt (found in the DLA, Marbach, in April 1990)
- Greve's passage to North America on the White Star Liner Megantic from Liverpool to Montreal in July 1909 (found shortly after the 1998 international FPG Anniversary Symposium)
- the Bonanza Farm "in the Dakotas" described in A Search for America (1925) (found in March 1996 at the NDSU archives, Fargo, & video-recorded as the Linguistic Circle of Manitoba & North Dakota's 1996 LCMND Presidential Dinner Address at the University of Winnipeg)
- Else & Greve's Sparta, Kentucky, location in 1910/11 (known ONLY from her poem "Schalk" in the University of Maryland, College Park, FrL Collection; discovered there in April 1991, & included as facsimile 49b in FPG's Poetry Ed. published in Dec. 1993. – [e-Ed.] of this poem in comparison with Greve's "Erster Sturm")
- two NYT articles about FPG & FrL Pittsburgh arrest for cross-dressing & smoking in public, Sep. 1910, and about FrL's 1915 modelling jobs in NY
- two FrL images showing her in exotic garb & pose (found in 2006 at the Library of Congress' Bain Collection): one showing FrL alone, the other showing FrL leaning on Jamaican poet Claude McKay

FPG book collections: Greve's translations and Grove's library

The UMA hold all of Grove's and Greve's known publications. Canadian and some foreign theses are also extant in various formats.

The Grove Library & the Greve Translations Collections are available online:

- The Grove Library Collection of some 500 titles contains many of the incredible number of books Grove translated into German when he was Greve. Most notable are perhaps certain Meredith titles, & a complete set of Temple Scott's Swift edition.
- The FPG Translations Collection reflects a complete record of Greve's titanic efforts, 1898–1909, starting out with Dante sonnets, Oscar Wilde texts & criticism, Browning, Dowson, Pater, Meredith, Swinburne (both of whom died in 1909 when Greve chose voluntary exile), H. G. Wells, Balzac, Flaubert, & Gide, as well as all 12 v. from Burton's Arabian Nights.

"In Memoriam FPG": 1998 Anniversary Symposium The international anniversary symposium "In Memoriam FPG: 1879-1948-1998" was recorded on 12 videos. In 2007, they were digitized & became the Symposium's e-Proceedings.

FPG & FrL Endowment (1995ff) A FPG & FrL Endowment Fund devoted to Greve/Grove and Freytag-Loringhoven projects was established in 1995/96. Promotional brochures, various e-text publications, and the FPG & FrL Website were all partly or entirely funded by this endowment.

== Pseudonyms ==
Grove used so many aliases that Karl Wolfskehl called him a Pseudologe and referred to his Munchhausiaden.

FPG: he used these initials on both sides of the Atlantic.

Grove: a modification of the author's real name, Greve. On the Immigration Manifesto of the White Star Liner Megantic on July 31, 1909, Grove's name was smudged, though the central vowel looks like an "o".

Fanny Essler: Joint pseudonym for F.P. Greve and Else Greve used in 1904–05, for poem published in Die Freistatt.

F. C. Gerden: used in correspondence with his Insel publishers for translations of decadent literature (Dowson, Browning).

Konrad Thorer: used for translations of works by Miguel de Cervantes and Alain-René Lesage.

Andrew R. Rutherford: a pseudonym suggested (but not used) for his first Canadian book Over Prairie Trails (1922); the name, which references Grove's friend Herman Kilian's maternal grandfather, a renowned Scottish judge, also appears in relation to his unpublished typescript in the University of Manitoba Archives, Jane Atkinson (ca. 1923, e-publ. 2000).

== Works about Grove ==
Elsa von Freytag-Loringhoven wrote a poem entitled "Kinship," which is dedicated to Grove: "Memory to F.P.G." In this poem, she juxtaposes the beginning and the ending of their ten-year relationship, using eroticized horseback riding as a metaphor for a highly charged journey through memory.

The Canadian heavy metal band Torture for Pleasure quote from Groves' novel Settlers of the Marsh in their song "TETELESTAI (Sweet Darkness)," released independently in 2013.

== Biographies and scholarship ==
D. O. Spettigue discovered Grove's identity behind a web of fiction in October 1971 in the British Museum. Uncovering Grove's prison incarceration in Germany, Spettigue published his findings in his 1973 book FPG: The European Years. This monograph was followed by Paul I. Hjartarson's volume of essays, A Stranger to My Life, and prompted the translation of Grove's German fiction into English, Fanny Essler, and The Master Mason's House, both closely based on the life of Grove's first wife Elsa Plötz (aka The Baroness). Desmond Pacey edited The Letters of F.P. Grove in addition to publishing a monograph, Frederick Philip Grove, while Margaret Stobie explored Grove's teaching years in Manitoba in her book, Frederick Philip Grove.

Leading later efforts to establish the identity of Greve/Grove by unearthing new biographical information and relevant records, Klaus Martens has been "the chief pioneer" (W.J. Keith). Exploring both the European and Canadian contexts, Martens published Felix Paul Greves Karriere (in German), Felix Paul Greve – André Gide (correspondence in English, French, and German), and F. P. Grove in Europe and Canada: Translated Lives, the first well documented biography of the author in English. Martens' vast compilation Over Canadian Trails: F.P. Grove in New Letters and Documents includes the most extensive published collection of letters from and to Grove, including the Phelps correspondence, documents, many photographs, and much relevant commentary by the editor. This was preceded by Martens' A Dirge for My Daughter, a careful edition of selected poems by Grove which includes photographs and reproductions of handwritten letters and notes. In addition to his Grove monographs and editions, Martens published numerous articles on both Grove and Else Plötz.

In her book Sexualizing Power in Naturalism: Theodore Dreiser and Frederick Philip Grove, Irene Gammel examined the gender relationships of Grove's fiction, focussing in particular on his sexualized (and modern) female figures and the overexposed relationships of power. Gammel also traced Grove's relationship with Elsa Plötz (Baroness Elsa) in her biography Baroness Elsa: Gender, Dada, and Everyday Modernity, documenting that the couple had been legally married and that Grove's reasons for hiding his identity had much to do with his fear of being discovered by his former wife, the dada artist Baroness Elsa. It has also been argued, by Martens in Over Canadian Trails, perhaps more persuasively, that Greve understandably changed his identity in order to escape internment as a German national at the outbreak of the Great War.

In his essay "Felix Paul Greve, The Eulenburg Scandal, and Frederick Philip Grove," Richard Cavell proposed a queering approach to Grove's work, while Paul Hjartarson and Tracy Kulba's collection Baroness Elsa von Freytag-Loringhoven and Felix Paul Greve assembles a range of perspectives by a number of scholars, including the editors, as well as Jutta Ernst, Klaus Martens, and Paul Morris.

A great deal of research results have been provided by Dr. Gaby Divay at the University of Manitoba Archives, who also published a comprehensive edition of Grove's, Greve's and "Fanny Essler"s poetry in December 1993, and as an e-Edition in 2007.

== Further research and portraits ==
- Greve in Germany & Europe, 1879–1909
- FPG in the USA, 1909–1912
- Grove in Canada, 1912–1948
- "Solar Grove" (UMA 1996)
- "Six Times Solar Grove" (UMA 2005)

== Works ==
Felix Paul Greve, 1901–1909

- Wanderungen (Poems) – 1902
- Helena und Damon (Play) – 1902
- Gedichte/Ein Portrait: Drei Sonette/ Gedichte, Von Fanny Essler (joint pseud. for F. P. Greve & Else Endell/Freytag-Loringhoven) in Die Freistatt – 1904/5
  - Bilingual e-Edition UMA 2005
- Fanny Essler: ein Berliner Roman (about Else Plötz, Endell, Greve, & later von Freytag-Loringhoven) – 1905
  - Fanny Essler: a novel (Engl. Transl., 2v.) – 1984
- Maurermeister Ihles Haus (about Else von Freytag-Loringhoven) – 1906
  - The Master Mason's House (Engl. Transl.) – 1976
- [Der Sentimentalist (Novel) – announced ca. 1907)]
- [Der heimliche Adel (Drama) – announced ca. 1907)]

Frederick Philip Grove, 1914–1948

- Rousseau als Erzieher (Essay by "Fred Grove", Winkler, Manitoba) – Der Nordwesten (Winnipeg), 1914
- Over Prairie Trails (Essays) – 1922
- The Turn of the Year (Essays) – 1923
- Settlers of the Marsh (Novel) – 1925
- A Search for America (Autobiogr. Novel) – (1927
  - e-Edition with Introduction & Commentaries, UMA – 2000/5
- Our Daily Bread (Novel) – 1928
- It Needs to be Said (Essays) – 1929
- The Yoke of Life (Novel) – 1930
- Fruits of the Earth (Novel) – 1933
- Two Generations (Novel) – 1939
- The Master of the Mill (Novel) – 1944
- In Search of Myself (Autobiography) – 1946 (Won Governor General's Award)
  - e-Edition, UMA – 2007
- Consider Her Ways (Novel) – 1947

Posthumous

- Tales from the Margin (Short Stories) – 1971 [Forward, introduction, notes and appendix written by Desmond Pacey]
- Letters of Frederick Philip Grove (contains letters by Felix Paul Greve) – 1976
- The Adventure of Leonard Broadus (1983, 2015)
  - Boys' novel first published in a heavily redacted version in a church magazine in the 1940s; original manuscript published in Canadian Children's Literature in 1983 and in book form in 2015
- Poems/Gedichte by/von Frederick Philip Grove, Felix Paul Greve, und 'Fanny Essler' – 1993
- A Dirge for My Daughter, Poems by Frederick Philip Grove – 2006
  - Historical-critical e-Edition, UMA – 2007
- Jane Atkinson (ts. Novel, ca. 1923) e-Edition, UMA – 2000

Related books by/about FPG (Greve/Grove)

- "Greve's & Freytag-Loringhovens 'Fanny Essler' Poems: FPG's or Else's?", UMA – 2005
