= Earle Birney =

Canadian poet (1904–1995)

Earle Birney OC FRSC
- Born: Earle Alfred Birney; 13 May 1904; Calgary, Alberta District, North-West Territories, Canada
- Died: 3 September 1995 (aged 91); Toronto, Ontario, Canada
- Education: University of British Columbia; University of Toronto
- Spouse: Esther Bull (1940–1977)
- Partner: Wailin Low (1973–1995)
- Writing career
- Notable works: David and Other Poems (1942); Now Is Time (1945); The Bear on the Delhi Road (1973)
- Notable awards: Governor General's Award (1942; 1945); Lorne Pierce Medal (1953)

Earle Alfred Birney OC FRSC (13 May 1904 – 3 September 1995) was a Canadian poet and novelist, who twice won the Governor General's Award, Canada's top literary honour, for his poetry.

== Life ==
Birney was born in Calgary in what was then the District of Alberta, and raised on a farm in Erickson, near Creston, British Columbia. His childhood was somewhat isolated. After working as a farm hand, a bank clerk, and a park ranger, he went on to college to study chemical engineering, but graduated with a degree in English. He studied at the University of British Columbia, the University of Toronto, the University of California, Berkeley and the University of London.

During his year in Toronto he became a Marxist–Leninist. Through a brief and quickly annulled marriage to Sylvia Johnston, he was introduced to Trotskyism. In the 1930s, he was an active Trotskyist in Canada, the United States and Britain, and was the leading figure in the Socialist Workers League, but he disagreed with the Trotskyist position on World War II and left the movement.

During the conflict, he served as a personnel officer in the Canadian Army, an experience that he used in his 1949 novel, Turvey.

In 1946, Birney began teaching at the University of British Columbia, "where he founded and directed the first Canadian creative writing programme." His work led to the establishment of Canada's first Department of Creative Writing at UBC.

The American poet William Stafford was a friend and correspondent of Birney's, writing the introduction to his 1968 poetry collection Memory No Servant.

In 1995, Birney died of a heart attack.

== Writing ==
=== Fiction ===
Birney's World War II experiences inspired the creation of the title character of his comic military novel, Turvey (1949), a saga of one hapless soldier's struggle to get to 'the sharp end' of the fighting in the Netherlands and Germany during 1944–1945. The character of Turvey is a fascinating melange of country boy innocent, common sense utilitarian and town fool, and seems to have been fashioned as a foil to the eccentrically pseudo-sophisticated Canadian military life as illustrated in the novel. The book has been described as "uproariously ribald", winning the Stephen Leacock Medal for Humour. Turvey was a hit in Canada, selling 30,000 copies.

Birney published his second novel, Down the Long Table, a Marxist novel about the Great Depression, in 1955. It did not match the first novel's success.

=== Poetry ===
Beginning with David and Other Poems (1942), much of his poetry was published during his tenure at the University of Toronto. Birney's poetry consistently explored the resources of language with passionate and playful curiosity. That first volume won Birney a Governor General's Award in 1942. The title work, "a poem about euthanasia, became quite a controversial poem, frequently anthologized and taught in Canadian literature courses." "A generation of Canadian schoolchildren and university students has grown up knowing the story," Al Purdy wrote in 1974. "At one time or another in the last 25 years, "David" has been required reading for high schools and universities in every Canadian province."

His second book of poetry, Now Is Time, won Birney a second Governor General's Award in 1945.

By the time of Birney's Trial of a City and other Verse in 1952, literary critic Northrop Frye was calling him one of "Canada's two leading poets" (the other being E. J. Pratt).

The Royal Society of Canada awarded Birney its Lorne Pierce Medal for literature in 1953.

In the mid-1960s, Birney collaborated with electronic composer Terry Rusling on CBC Radio. A poem was performed combined with electronic music and afterwards they discussed their respective work and experimental approaches.

Birney's typography became increasingly more experimental during the 1960s, and in his 1966 Selected Poems he revised many of his older poems, dropping punctuation and sentence structure. He explained his reasoning in the preface to that book:

Our intricate system of speckles between words evolved comparatively recently and merely to ensure that prose became beautifully unambiguous – Instant Communication. For a while the poets went along with this, even though what they were shooting at was the art of indefinitely delayed communication – Indefinite Ambiguity. Belatedly but willingly influenced by contemporary trends, I've come to surround my pauses with space rather than with typographical spatter, and to take advantage of the new printing processes to free my work occasionally from the tyranny of one-direction linotype.

In 1970, Birney was made an Officer of the Order of Canada.

In 1974, Birney was still being called "one of the two best poets in Canada," this time by Al Purdy (the other being Irving Layton).

In 1982, Birney recorded Nexus & Earle Birney, a triple-album collaboration with avant-garde percussion group Nexus.

The Canadian Encyclopedia sums up: "In long poems and lyrics, sight poems, sound poems and found poems, whether on the page or in his collection of recorded poems with the percussion ensemble NEXUS (1982), Birney demonstrated his deep commitment to making language have meaning in every possible and eloquent way."

== Publications ==
=== Poetry ===
- David and Other Poems. Toronto: Ryerson Press, 1942.
- Now Is Time. Toronto: Ryerson Press, 1945.
- The Strait of Anian. Toronto: Ryerson Press, 1948.
- Trial of a City and Other Verse. Toronto: Ryerson, 1952.
- Ice Cod Bell or Stone. Toronto: McClelland and Stewart, 1962.
- Near False Creek Mouth. Toronto: McClelland and Stewart, 1964.
- Two Poems. Halifax, 1964.
- Selected Poems: 1940–1966. Toronto: McClelland and Stewart, 1966.
- Memory No Servant, 1968.
- The Poems of Earle Birney: a New Canadian Library selection (New Canadian library original N06), Toronto: McClelland and Stewart, 1969.
- pnomes jukollages & other stunzas, 1969.
- Rag & Bone Shop. Toronto: McClelland and Stewart, 1970.
- The Bear on the Delhi Road: selected poems. London: Chatto & Windus, 1973.
- what's so big about GREEN?. Toronto: McClelland and Stewart, 1973.
- The Collected Poems of Earle Birney. Toronto: McClelland and Stewart, 1975.
- Alphabeings and Other Seasyours. London, Ont.: Pikadilly Press, 1976.
- The Rugging and the Moving Times: Poems New and Uncollected 1976. Coatsworth, ON: Black Moss Press, 1976.
- Ghost in the Wheels: Selected Poems. Toronto: McClelland and Stewart, 1977.
- Fall by Fury & Other Makings. Toronto: McClelland and Stewart, 1978.
- The Mammoth Corridors. Okemos, MI.: Stone Press, 1980.
- Copernican Fix. Toronto: ECW Press, 1985.
- Last Makings: Poems. Toronto: McClelland & Stewart, 1991.
- One Muddy Hand: Selected Poems, Sam Solecki (ed.), 2006.
- The Essential Earle Birney, Jim Johnstone (ed.), 2014.
- January Morning/Downtown Vancouver.

=== Fiction ===
- Turvey: A Military Picaresque. Toronto: McClelland & Stewart, 1949.
- Down the Long Table. Toronto: McClelland & Stewart, 1955.
- Big Bird in the Bush: Selected Stories and Sketches. Oakville, ON: Mosaic Press, 1978.

=== Non-fiction ===
- The Creative Writer, 1966
- The Cow Jumped Over the Moon: The Writing and Reading of Poetry, Toronto: Holt, Rinehart and Winston, 1972.
- Essays on Chaucerian Irony, 1985.
- Spreading Time: Remarks on Canadian Writing and Writers, 1904–1949, 1989.
- Conversations with Trotsky, Earle Birney and the Radical 1930s: Collected Trotskyist Writings of Birney and Related Material, University of Ottawa Press, 2017, ISBN 9780776624631.

=== Plays ===
- The Damnation of Vancouver. New Canadian Library original; N 011. Toronto: McClelland & Stewart, 1977.
- Words on Waves: selected radio plays of Earle Birney. Kingston, ON: Quarry Press & CBC Enterprises, 1985.

=== Edited ===
- Twentieth Century Canadian Poetry, an anthology with introduction and notes. Toronto: Ryerson Press, 1953.
- Four parts sand. New Canadian poets. [Ottawa]: Oberon Press, 1972.

Except where noted, bibliographic information courtesy University of Toronto.

== Discography ==
- Nexus & Earle Birney (Nexus, 1982)
- Celebration: Famous Canadian Poets on CD (with Irving Layton) (Canadian Poetry Association 2001) ISBN 1-55253-029-9.

== Filmography ==
Writer (4 titles)

- 1995: Trawna Tuh Belvul
- 1993: David (short) (poem)
- 1983: Aloud (short) (poem)
- 1970: Espolio (short) (poem)

Actor (1 title)

- 1983: Aloud (short) Reciter

Self (3 titles)

- 1993: View from the Typewriter; Himself
- 1981: Earle Birney: Portrait of a Poet; Himself
- 1965: Ladies and Gentlemen... Mr. Leonard Cohen (documentary)(uncredited)

Except where noted, film information from Internet Movie Database.

== See also ==
- Canadian literature
- Canadian poetry
- List of Canadian poets
