= Adele Wiseman =

Canadian writer (1928–1992)

- Born: May 21, 1928; Winnipeg, Manitoba, Canada
- Died: June 1, 1992 (aged 64); Toronto, Ontario, Canada
- Education: University of Manitoba (BA, 1949)
- Occupations: Novelist, playwright, essayist
- Writing career
- Notable works: The Sacrifice; Crackpot
- Notable awards: Governor General's Award for English-language fiction (1956)

Adele Wiseman (May 21, 1928 – June 1, 1992) was a Canadian author.

Born in Winnipeg, Manitoba, she received a Bachelor of Arts in English literature and psychology from the University of Manitoba in 1949. Her parents were Russian Jews who emigrated from Ukraine to Canada, in part, to escape the pogroms that accompanied the Russian Civil War.

In 1956, Wiseman published her first novel, The Sacrifice, which won the Governor General's Award, Canada's most prestigious literary prize. Her novel, Crackpot, was published in 1974. Both novels deal with Jewish immigrant heritage, the struggle to survive the Depression and World War II, and the challenges the next generation faced in acculturating to Canadian society.

Wiseman also published plays, children's stories, essays, and other non-fiction. Her book, Old Woman at Play, examines and meditates on the creative process while paying tribute to Wiseman's mother and the dolls she made.

Wiseman was lifelong friends with Margaret Laurence who was another Canadian author from Manitoba. She was an active and accessible Writer-in-Residence at the University of Windsor in her final years. At a campus rally against the First Gulf War, she read passionately a new poem denouncing war.

== Awards ==
- Governor General's Award for English-language fiction for The Sacrifice (1956)
- Beta Sigma Phi Sorority Award (1957)
- Brotherhood Award of the National Conference of Christians and Jews (1957)
- Canadian Foundation fellowship (1957)
- Guggenheim fellowship (1958)
- Canada Council Arts Scholarship (1959)
- Leipzig Book Fair Bronze Medal (1964)
- Canadian Booksellers Association Book Award (1974)
- J. I. Segal Foundation Award (1974 and 1988)
- Three Guineas Charitable Foundation Agency Award (1984–1985)

== Selected works ==
- The Sacrifice (1956)
- Old Markets, New World (1964)
- Crackpot (1974)
- Old Woman at Play (1978)
- Memoirs of a Book Molesting Childhood and Other Essays (1987)
- Kenji and the Cricket (1988)
- Puccini and the Prowlers (1992)
