= Charles Heavysege =

Canadian poet and dramatist

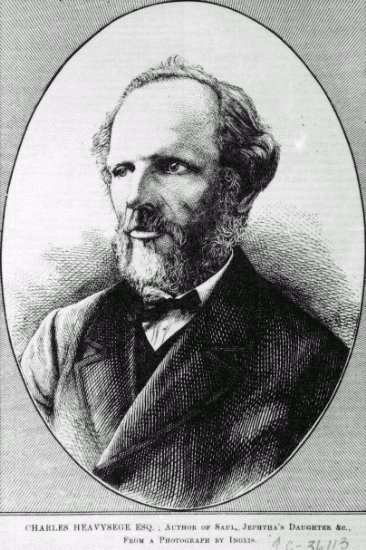
- Born: 2 May 1816; Huddersfield, Yorkshire, England
- Died: 14 July 1876 (aged 60); Montreal, Quebec
- Citizenship: British subject
- Writing career
- Language: English
- Notable works: Saul, Jephthah's Daughter

Charles Heavysege (May 2, 1816 – July 14, 1876) was a Canadian poet and dramatist. He was one of the earliest poets to publish in Canada. He is known for his critically acclaimed play Saul.

== Life and writing ==
Heavysege was born in Huddersfield, Yorkshire, England. Heavysege left school at 9, to return only briefly later. He emigrated to Montreal in 1853 where he worked as a wood carver. In 1860 he became a reporter for the Montreal Transcript, and later for the Montreal Daily Witness, where he eventually became city editor.

As a poet, Heavysege was mainly influenced by "Milton, Shakespeare, and the Bible." His first published work was The revolt of Tartarus, a poem in six parts, published in two editions: one under his own name in London in 1852, and a second, heavily edited and published anonymously in Montreal, in 1855.

He published Sonnets in 1855, Saul: a drama in three parts in 1857, Count Filippo; or, the unequal marriage in 1860, The Owl (an imitation of Poe's "The Raven") and The Huntsman in 1864, The Advocate (a prose work) and Jephthah's daughter in 1865, and Jezebel in 1867.

During his lifetime, Saul was Heavysege's best-known work. Nathaniel Hawthorne passed on a copy to the North British Review, where it was given a laudatory (unsigned) review by Coventry Patmore, who called it "indubitably the best poem ever written out of Great Britain." That was followed by further favorable reviews in the Atlantic Monthly, Galaxy, and New York Evening Post. Saul was published in two further editions, in 1859 (also in Montreal) and 1869 (in Boston). (The Boston edition was reprinted in 1876 and again in 1967.) Other admirers of Saul were Canadian Prime Minister Sir John A. Macdonald and American poet Henry Wadsworth Longfellow.

Heavysege was internationally known by the 1860s and 1870s, paving the way for later Anglo-Canadian poets, including Charles Sangster and Charles G.D. Roberts.

W.D. Lighthall, who included Heavysege's work in his 1889 anthology Songs of the Great Dominion, wrote that Heavysege's poetry was not particularly Canadian, and that he didn't have a large readership in Canada. Nonetheless, he declared that Canadian critics "claim him as perhaps their greatest, most original writer." He believed that Heavysege's poetry was worth appreciating and would continue to be popular.

However, his reputation declined in later decades; as national pride grew in the 1920s, he was criticized for not really being a "Canadian writer". He continued to be supported by poets W.W.E. Ross, Ralph Gustafson, and A.J.M. Smith.

In 1956, while dismissing Saul and Count Filippo as "Victorian dinosaurs," Canadian literary critic Northrop Frye acknowledged Heavysege as the "first poet who really came to grips with" what Frye considered to be "the central Canadian tragic theme" (that being "the indifference of nature to human values"): "His third poem, Jephthah's Daughter, seems to me to reflect more directly the influence of his Canadian environment, as its main themes are loneliness, the indifference of nature, and the conception of God as a force of nature."

Saul was produced as a radio drama by the Canadian Broadcasting Corporation in 1974. Alan Scarfe performed the title role.

== In fiction ==
Solly Bridgetower, a character in Robertson Davies' The Salterton Trilogy, is an associate professor of English at the fictional Waverley University, and is urged by his department chair, Dr. Sengreen, to stake out a claim in the emerging field of "Amcan" (American-Canadian literature) by editing a scholarly edition of Heavysege's collected works, in order to earn tenure and make a name for himself (Leaven of Malice, 1954).

== Publications ==
Heaysege published nine works of poetry and prose in his lifetime:

- The revolt of Tartarus. London, UK: Simpkin, Marshall & Co, 1850. Liverpool, UK: D. Marples, 1850. Montreal, 1855.
- Sonnets (Montreal: H. & G.M. Rose, 1855)
- Saul: a drama Montreal: H. Rose, 1857; John Lovell, 1859. Boston: Fields, Osgood, 1869, 1876.
- Count Filippo; or, the unequal marriage. Montreal: B. Dawson, 1860. Toronto, R.& A. Miller, 1860.
- The Owl (Montreal, 1864)
- The Dark Huntsman (a dream) Montreal, "Witness" Steam Print House, 1864. ISBN 0-665-35998-5 Ottawa: Golden Dog, 1973. ISBN 978-0-919614-04-8
- The Advocate. Toronto, 1865. Montreal: R. Worthington, 1865. A novel.
- Jepthtah's Daughter. London : S. Low, Son, and Marston, 1865., Montreal: H. Dawson, 1865). Reprint, 1983. ISBN 0-665-35958-6
- "Jezebel", New Dominion Monthly (Montreal), 1867. Jezebel. Ottawa: Golden Dog, 1972.
- Saul and Selected Poems Toronto, Buffalo: U of Toronto P, 1977. ISBN 978-0-8020-6262-8
