= Rosanna Eleanor Leprohon =

Canadian writer and poet (1829–1879)

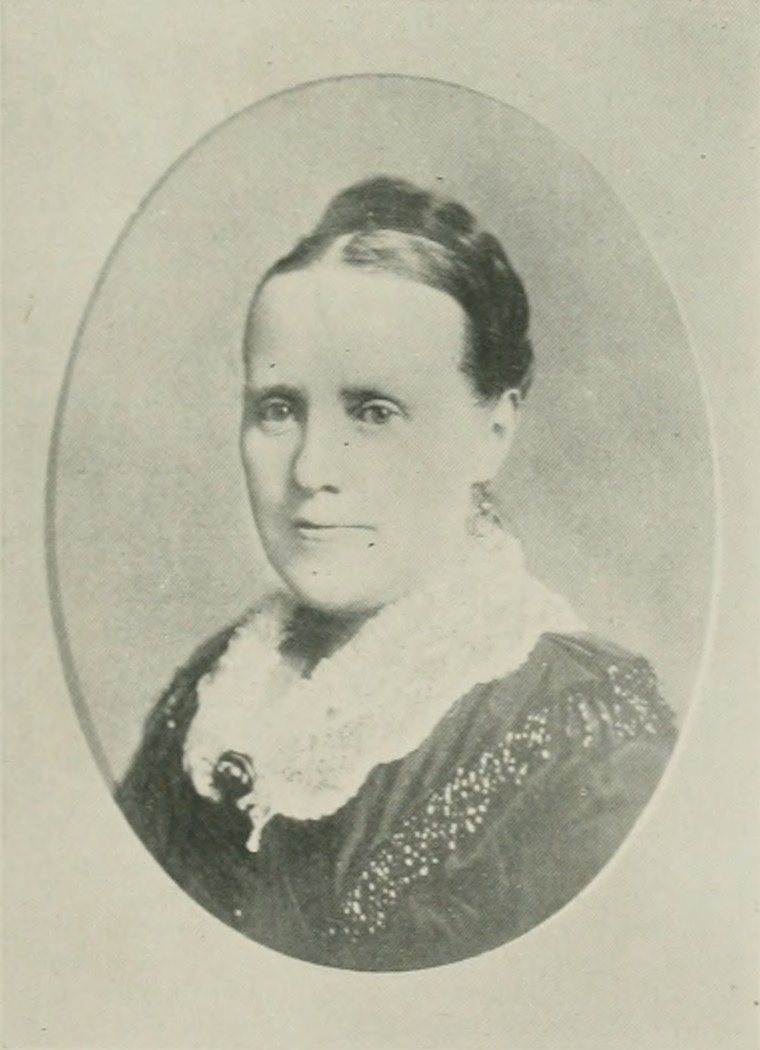
- Born: Rosanna Eleanor Mullins; January 12, 1829; Montreal, Lower Canada
- Died: September 20, 1879 (aged 50); Montreal, Quebec
- Citizenship: British subject
- Occupations: Author, poet
- Spouse: Dr. Jean-Lukin Leprohon
- Writing career
- Language: English, French
- Genre: fiction

Rosanna Eleanor Leprohon (January 12, 1829 – September 20, 1879), born Rosanna Eleanor Mullins, was a Canadian writer and poet. She was "one of the first English-Canadian writers to depict French Canada in a way that earned the praise of, and resulted in her novels being read by, both anglophone and francophone Canadians."

== Life ==
Leprohon was born on January 12, 1829, in Montreal to Francis and Rosanna Mullins. The second daughter of a wealthy merchant, she was educated at the Convent of the Congregation of Notre Dame. She later wrote the poems "A Touching Ceremony" and "On the Death of the Same Reverend Nun" to honor the nuns and convent.

She "published her first poetry, at age 17, in Literary Garland, followed by serialized novels of manners set in England, published annually from 1848 to 1851." Ida Beresford, her first novel, first ran in the Garland in nine instalments in 1848. The novel was praised by Susanna Moodie, who called it "a story written with great power and vigor" that promised its author "a bright wreath of fame."

On June 17, 1851 Rosanna married Dr. Jean-Lucien Leprohon, and went to live with him in Saint-Charles-sur-Richelieu. Within a year she was pregnant; she would go on to have 13 children (of whom eight survived). Her literary output suffered. By 1859, though she was back in Montreal and had resumed writing, with a new novel, Eveleen O'Donnell, serialized in Boston magazine The Pilot.

The experience of being married to a French-Canadian, and living in the heart of French Canada, gave her a perspective denied to most English Canadian novelists—one she put to use in her next novel, The Manor House of De Villerai: A Tale of Canada Under the French Dominion, which was published in installments by the Montreal Family Herald in 1859-1860. In this novel, "Leprohon used a Canadian setting and depicted events of crucial importance in Canadian history. She depicted these events, furthermore, from the point of view of French Canadians," something new in English-Canadian literature.

Leprohon continued to write of French Canada in her next two novels, Antoinette de Mirecourt or, Secret Marrying and Secret Sorrowing, and Armand Durand or, A Promise Fulfilled, which were published by Lovell in 1864 and 1868. "While Leprohon's earlier works have non-Canadian settings, these [three] novels are set in Quebec and effectively depict Québécois history and culture."

All three of these Canadian novels "were well reviewed at the time of their first publication in both the English- and French-Canadian press." A French translation of each was quickly published, and all three "became part of both Canadian literatures." "Le manoir de Villerai (Montréal, 1884) and the French translation of Armand Durand were still being published in the mid-1920s." "Le Manoir de Villerai (installments 1851, book form 1861), frequently reprinted in French, has yet to appear in book form in the original English."

Five of Leprohon's poems were included in Edward Hartley's 1864 anthology, Selections from Canadian Poets. In 1867, the biographical dictionary Bibliotheca Canadensis said she had done "more almost than any other Canadian writer to foster and promote the growth of a national Literature."

Another novel, Ada Dunmore, was published in the Canadian Illustrated News in installments in 1869-70. "'Clive Weston's wedding anniversary' appeared in The Canadian Monthly and National Review in 1872. Leprohon's last published work, 'A school-girl friendship' (1877), was published in the Canadian Illustrated News in 1877."

In 1881, Montreal Gazette editor John Reade edited a posthumous collected poems, The Poetical Works of Mrs. Leprohon, also published by Lovell. A poem from the volume, "A Canadian Summer Evening," was included in W.D. Lighthall's 1889 anthology, Songs of the Great Dominion.

== Recognition ==
Leprohon's novels were popular in both English and French Canada in the late 19th century, and were still being reprinted in French in the mid-1920s. They gradually went out of fashion in the early 20th century, as literary styles changed.

"Since 1970, however,"says the Dictionary of Literary Biography, "the life and works of Rosanna Eleanor Mullins Leprohon have been frequently noted and increasingly praised by critics and scholars of both English-and French-Canadian literature, and new editions of her works have been published."

== Publications ==
=== English ===
- Antoinette de Mirecourt: Or, Secret Marrying and Secret Sorrowing. Montreal: John Lovell, 1864.
  - Antoinette de Mirecourt: Or, Secret Marrying and Secret Sorrowing: Ottawa: Carleton UP, 1989. ISBN 0-88629-092-9
  - Antoinette de Mirecourt: Or Secret Marrying and Secret Sorrowing. Toronto: McClelland & Stewart New Canadian Library, 2000. ISBN 0-7710-3469-5
- Armand Durand: or A Promise Fulfilled. Montreal: John Lovell, 1868.
  - Armand Durand: or A Promise Fulfilled Hardcover, Ottawa: Tecumseh Press, 1994. ISBN 0-919662-46-3
  - Armand Durand: or A Promise Fulfilled Softcover, Ottawa: Tecumseh Press, 1994. ISBN 0-919662-47-1
- The Poetical Works of Mrs. Leprohon. 1881.

=== French ===
- Le manoir de Villerai. Montreal: Beauchemin, 1925
