= John Reade =

Canadian journalist, essayist, and poet

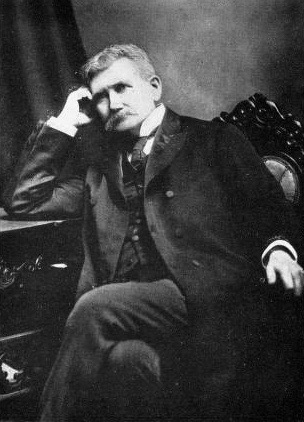
- Born: November 13, 1837; Ballyshannon, Ireland
- Died: March 26, 1919 (aged 81); Montreal, Quebec
- Citizenship: British subject
- Education: Queen's College, Belfast
- Writing career
- Language: English
- Notable awards: FRSC, FRSL

John Reade (November 13, 1837 – March 26, 1919) was an Irish-born Canadian journalist, essayist, and poet once considered "the grand old man of Canadian letters." He is best known as the literary editor of the Montreal Gazette, a position he held for almost 50 years.

== Life ==
John Reade was born in Ballyshannon, Donegal, Ireland, in 1837, the son of Frances Smyth and Joseph Reade. He was educated at Portora School, Enniskillen, and Queen's College, Belfast.

Reade immigrated to the Province of Canada with his parents in 1856, settling in Montreal. Within a year he had founded and was editing Montreal Literary Magazine. In 1859, after beginning studying law, he became rector of Lachute Academy, and began studying theology. He was ordained an Anglican minister in 1865, and served in two parishes (Mascouche and Mansonville) before leaving the ministry in 1867 due to ill health.

Returning to Montreal in 1868, Reade began writing for the Montreal Gazette. In 1870 he became the Gazette's literary editor, and held that position until his death in 1919.

At the Gazette Reade was best known for his weekly column, "Old and New," but he also wrote "hundreds of unsigned editorials, reviews, and articles" for the paper. In addition, he "published poems, essays, translations, or short fiction in virtually all of the major Canadian journals of his day."

Reade was a Fellow of the British Royal Society of Literature, and a founding Fellow of the Royal Society of Canada in 1882. He was a member, and served as president, of both the Society of Canadian Literature and the Society for Historical Studies. He was also a member of the Société littéraire et historique de Québec.

Eight of Reade's poems were published in the 1864 anthology, Selections from Canadian Poets. His own book, Merlin's Prophecy and Other Poems (a book "steeped in Victorian Romanticism"), appeared in 1870. The title poem, which used the form of Tennyson's Idylls of the King, was a purported prophecy of contemporary Canada and the British Empire, which Reade wrote to commemorate Prince Arthur's 1869 visit to Canada. John Lesperance called it "the most perfect poem ever written in Canada." The book also included Reade's translations of Aeschylus, Euripides, Homer, Horace, and Virgil.

In 1881 Reade edited Rosanna Eleanor Leprohon's posthumous collected poems, The Poetical Works of Mrs. Leprohon.

Rose-Belford's Canadian Monthly and National Review printed Reade's long poem, "Madeleine de Vercheres," in 1878. In 1889, W.D. Lighthall selected "Madeleine" and two other Reade poems for his anthology Songs of the Great Dominion: "Hastings," which he used to begin the book, and "The Winter Carnival." Reade, Lighthall declared, was "one of the chief figures in Canadian literature, and probably the sweetest poet."

== Recognition ==
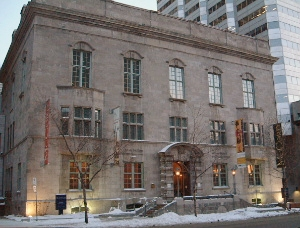
Reade's papers are at the McCord Museum of Canadian History in Montreal.

Reade was appointed a charter Fellow of the Royal Society of Canada in 1882, and was elected a Fellow of the Royal Society of Literature of Great Britain in 1896.

He was awarded an honorary doctorate from the University of Ottawa in 1909.

The Dictionary of Canadian Biography notes that although Reade "was appropriately identified in his later years as 'the grand old man of Canadian letters,' his reputation has not fulfilled the dream of his friend John Boyd that 'no anthology of Canadian verse will ever be complete without a wide selection from John Reade’s work, rich as it is in content and faultless in its technique.' Despite such praise, the late-Victorian personal, political, and poetic values characteristic of Reade’s poetry and criticism led to their general disregard within a few years of his death."

== Publications ==
=== Books of poetry ===
- The Prophecy of Merlin and Other Poems. Montreal: Dawson Bros., 1870.
- Madeleine de Vercheres (Toronto, [189–])

=== Anthologized poems ===
- Eight poems, Selections from Canadian poets, E.H. Dewart ed. Montreal, 1864; repr., intro. D. Lochhead, Toronto and Buffalo, N.Y., 1973.
- "Hastings," "The Winter Carnival," "Madeleine de Vercheres," Songs of the Great Dominion: Voices from the Forests and Waters, the Settlements and Cities of Canada, William Douw Lighthall ed. London: Walter Scott, 1891.

=== Prose ===
- "Thomas D’Arcy McGee – the poet," New Dominion Monthly (Montreal), February 1870: 12–21;
- "Winty Dane’s transformation," New Dominion Monthly, August 1874: 878–879. (short story)
- "Canada a hundred years ago," Belford's Monthly Magazine (Toronto), 1 (1877): 621–36:
- "The testimony of names of places," Rose-Belford's Canadian Monthly and National Review (Toronto), 1 (July–December 1878): 602–8;
- "Great explorers before Columbus," Trans. Literary and Hist. Soc., 17 (1882–1883), 3-31;
- "Lord Tennyson," Dominion Illustrated Monthly (Montreal), [2nd ser.], 1 (February 1892–January 1893): 631–39;
- "What is imperialism?" Canadian Magazine, 19 (May–October 1902): 316–18.

=== Edited ===
- Rosanna Leprohon, The Poetical Works of Mrs. Leprohon. Lovell, 1881.
- George Murray, Poems.. Montreal: E.G. O'Connor, 1912.

=== Fonds ===
Reade's papers are at the McCord Museum of Canadian History in Montreal.

Except where noted, bibliographic information courtesy Dictionary of Canadian Biography.
