= Charles Sangster =

Canadian poet

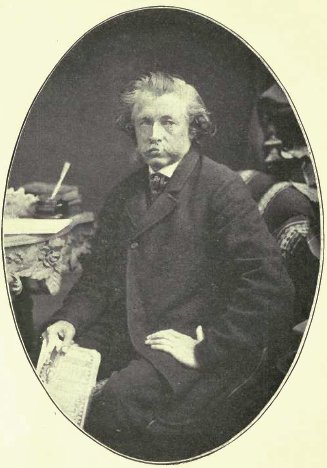
- Born: July 16, 1822 near Kingston, Upper Canada
- Died: December 9, 1893 (aged 71); Kingston, Ontario
- Resting place: Cataraqui Cemetery, Kingston
- Citizenship: British subject
- Occupations: journalist, civil servant
- Partner(s): Mary Kilborn, Henrietta Meagher
- Children: Charlotte, Florence, Gertrude, Roderick
- Writing career
- Language: English
- Genre: Poetry
- Notable works: The Saint Lawrence and the Saguenay

Charles Sangster (July 16, 1822 – December 9, 1893) was a Canadian poet. He was the first poet to write poetry which was substantially about Canadian subjects. The Dictionary of Canadian Biography calls him "the best of the pre-confederation poets."

== Life ==
Sangster was born at the Navy Yard on Point Frederick (now the site of Royal Military College of Canada), near Kingston, Ontario, the son of Ann Ross and James Sangster. A twin sister died in infancy. His father, a "joiner" or shipbuilder who worked for the British Navy around the Great Lakes, died at Penetanguishene just before Charles turned 2. His mother raised Charles and his 4 siblings on her own.

Sangster was an indifferent student, and showed little interest in the school curriculum. At 15 years old, he left school to help provide for the family. He took a job in the naval lab making cartridges at Fort Henry and two years later was transferred to the Ordnance office at the fort, where in his own words he “ranked as a messenger, received the pay of a labourer, and did the duty of a clerk.”

About this time (1839) Sangster wrote his first serious poem, a 700-line narrative in rhyming couplets called "The Rebel." Considering that it had been written by a boy with little formal education, the poem demonstrated a considerable vocabulary and a wealth of historical and geographical knowledge more typical of an experienced writer.

During the twelve years he worked at the Ordinance office Sangster began doing part-time work for a Kingston newspaper, the British Whig. He also continued writing poetry and submitting it, anonymously or pseudonymously, to the local papers.

=== Writing career and success ===
In 1849 Sangster quit his job at Fort Henry and moved to Amherstburg, Ontario, where he became editor of the Amherstburg Courier. When James Reeves, owner of the Courier, died the same year, Sangster returned to Kingston, to work as a proofreader and bookkeeper for the British Whig.

Sangster first gained national attention as a poet in 1850, when his poetry began appearing in Literary Garland, Canada's foremost literary magazine. Soon his work appeared in other magazines, such as Anglo-American Magazine.

In 1853 Sangster took a steamship excursion down the St. Lawrence River and up the Saguenay River in Quebec, which he wrote about for the Whig in a series of travel letters called "Etchings by the Way"—material he would also use in his long poem, "The St. Lawrence and the Saguenay".

Sangster published his first book of poetry, The St Lawrence and the Saguenay, and Other Poems, in 1856. The book was widely praised by reviewers and readers. According to the Dictionary of Canadian Biography, the volume "was received with unanimous acclaim as the best and most important book of poetry produced in Canada until that time." Susanna Moodie wrote to Sangster; "If a native of Canada, [one] may well be proud of her Bard, who has sung in such lofty strains the natural beauties of his native land." The National Magazine of London echoed the same sentiment: "Well may the Canadians be proud of such contributions to their infant literature.... In some sort, and according to his degree, Mr. Sangster may be regarded as the Wordsworth of Canada."

That same year, Sangster married Mary Kilborn, a 21-year-old Kingston woman. The couple moved into a brick house at 144 Barrie Street. An historical plaque was later erected to educate the public about the Sangster home. Mary died of pneumonia 16 months later.

In 1859, Sangster wrote the poem "Brock", commissioned for the inauguration of the monument to General Isaac Brock at Queenston Heights.

Sangster's second book of poetry, Hesperus and Other Poems and Lyrics, appeared in 1860, published in Kingston and Montreal. This second book proved even more popular than the first, and many critics considered it better than The St. Lawrence and the Saguenay. The same year, Sangster remarried, to Henrietta Charlotte Mary Meagher, who was only 17 years of age (to his 38).

In 1864, Sangster became a reporter for the Kingston Daily News, and 16 of his poems appeared in the first published anthology of Canadian poetry, Selections from Canadian Poets. The same year, the Sangsters' first child, Charlotte Mary, was born.

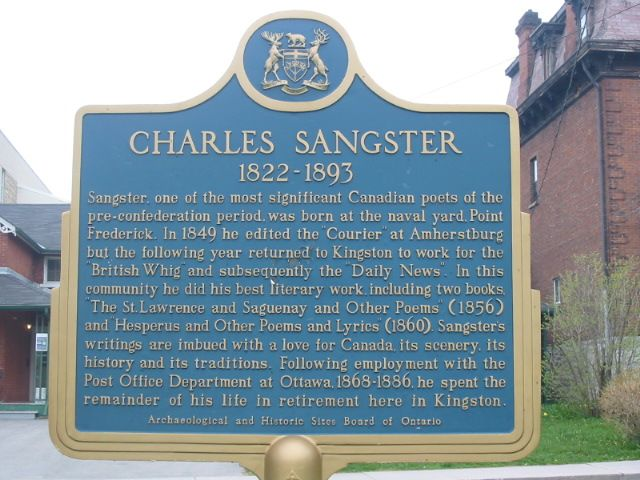
Charles Sangster plaque, Barrie St., Kingston, Ontario. Photo by Alan L. Brown, June 2004.

=== Post office and retirement ===
By 1867, Sangster was in poor health, suffering from depression and a nervous disorder. He was also having financial difficulties. To help him out his neighbor, the new Postmaster-General Alexander Campbell arranged a job for the 46-year-old Sangster in Ottawa with Canada's new Post Office Department in 1868. His daughter Charlotte died in 1868, shortly after the move to Ottawa. The same year, though, Mrs. Sangster gave birth to a second daughter, Florence. Two years later, in 1870, their third daughter, Gertrude was born, followed in 1879 by a son, Roderick.

Sangster's job required long hours and didn't pay very well. He published 16 poems in magazines between 1868 and 1878, most of which he had written before moving to Ottawa. He wrote virtually nothing for the 18 years he worked at the Post Office. As he later wrote: "When I went down to Ottawa ... I took a pile of M.S. of a third volume with me, as I thought 'ready for the press', but in all the 18 years I remained there I did little more than correct.... When they get a man into the Civil Service, their first duty is to crush him flat, and if he is a fool of a Poet, or dares to think of any nonsense of that kind, draw him through a Knot or a gimlet hole a few times, pile with agony of toil, toil, toil until his nerves are flattened out, all the rebound knocked out of him, and then – superannuate him ... and tell him he should be thankful."

Sangster had a nervous breakdown in 1875, and developed a chronic nervous system condition during the 1880s. In 1882 he was elected to the Royal Society of Canada. His wife Henrietta died sometime between 1883 and 1886, leaving him to raise his new family alone. After another breakdown in March 1886, he took a six-month leave of absence, and also resigned from the Royal Society. Finally, that September he retired and moved back to Kingston.

For the first years of retirement, Sangster did little but convalesce. In July 1888, he received a letter from W.D. Lighthall, inquiring about new poems for an upcoming anthology (most likely Lighthall's 1889 Songs of the Great Dominion. Sangster replied the next day, and the two men struck up a friendship by mail.

Revitalized, Sangster began revising his poetry. He doubled the size of "The Saint Lawrence and the Saguenay" to over 200 stanzas, and sent the manuscript to his cousin Amos Sangster to illustrate. When Amos died, the manuscript and the new poem was lost. However, 40 of the new stanzas had been published in various magazines, and so survived.

Sangster also cut many of the "other" poems in the first volume, and made over 2,000 changes to the ones he kept. Hesperus got off easier, but Sangster still made more than 200 revisions to the work. As well, Sangster prepared two more volumes for publication, mostly from poems he'd written before moving to Ottawa: Norland Echoes & Other Strains, and The Angel Guest & Other Poems.

By the summer of 1871, all four manuscripts were complete, and Sangster sent them off to Lighthall (who had become his literary executor). However, before any of them could be published, Sangster died. None of them were published until the 1970s.

Charles Sangster died in Kingston in 1893, and is buried in the city's Cataraqui Cemetery.

== Writing ==
The Canadian Encyclopedia says that "Sangster's poetry distinguishes him as a lover and keen observer of the natural world. He displays overwhelming passion in some poems and equally extreme melancholy in others. Whatever his mood he is consistently and intensely serious and deeply religious."

Sangster's inspiration was drawn from three themes: love, nature and religion. He wrote many poems about his experiences and was commended for his ability to express the beauty of Canada's landscapes. Sangster was often called the "father of Canadian poetry" because of this. Many of the love poems from his first book were directed towards his first wife; the nature poems were of his travels.

For a man with limited educational training, Charles Sangster had a vast vocabulary and an extensive knowledge of history, classics, mythology and authors. His poems demonstrate familiarity with classic, historic, and mythological works, as well as British and American authors, including Shakespeare, Milton, Burns, Wordsworth, P.J. Bailey, and Longfellow.

== Recognition ==
Sangster was elected a Fellow of the Royal Society of Canada in 1892.

== Publications ==
- The St. Lawrence and the Saguenay, and Other Poems. Kingston, ON: J. Creighton & J. Duff, 1856. New York: Miller, Orton & Mulligan, 1856.
- Hesperus, and Other Poems and Lyrics. Kingston: J. Creighton, 1860. Montreal: J. Lovell, 1860. London, UK: Trubner, 1860.
- Our Norland. Toronto: Copp Clark, [1890].
- The St Lawrence and the Saguenay and other poems; Hesperus and other poems and lyrics, intro. Gordon Johnston (Toronto: University of Toronto Press and Buffalo, N.Y., 1972. ISBN 0-8020-1935-8
- Norland echoes and other strains and lyrics,. Frank M. Tierney ed. Ottawa: Tecumseh, 1976. ISBN 0-919662-59-5
- The angel guest and other poems and lyrics. Frank M. Tierney ed. Ottawa: Tecumseh, 1977. ISBN 0-919662-63-3
- Hesperus and other poems and lyrics (rev. ed.). Frank M. Tierney ed. Ottawa: Tecumseh, 1979. ISBN 0-919662-72-2
- St. Lawrence and the Saguenay and other poems (rev. ed.). Frank M. Tierney ed. Ottawa: Tecumseh, 1984. ISBN 0-919662-95-1, ISBN 0-919662-96-X

Except where noted, bibliographic information courtesy Dictionary of Canadian Biography.
