= E. Pauline Johnson =

First Nations poet and performer from Canada (1861–1913)

Emily Pauline Johnson Tekahionwake
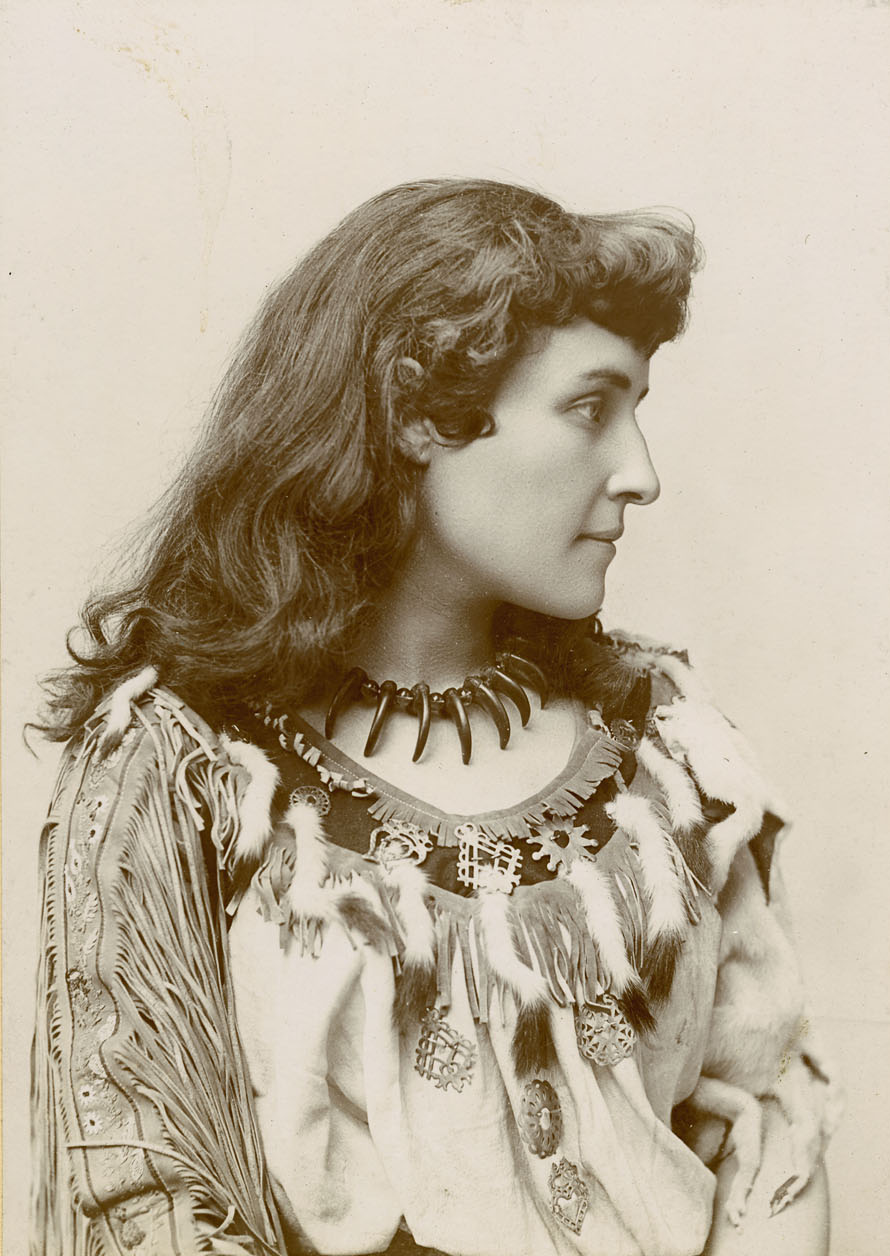
- E. Pauline Johnson, c. 1885–95
- Born: Emily Pauline Johnson; 10 March 1861; Six Nations, Canada West
- Died: 7 March 1913 (aged 51); Vancouver, British Columbia, Canada
- Resting place: Stanley Park, Vancouver
- Citizenship: Mohawk Nation; British subject
- Occupations: Poet; writer; stage performer
- Writing career
- Language: Mohawk, English
- Genre: Poetry
- Notable works: The White Wampum; Canadian Born; Flint and Feather; Legends of Vancouver

Emily Pauline Johnson (10 March 1861 – 7 March 1913), also known by her Mohawk stage name Tekahionwake (pronounced dageh-eeon-wageh, lit. 'double-life'), was a Canadian poet, author, and performer who was popular in the late 19th and early 20th centuries. Her father was a hereditary Mohawk chief, and her mother was an English immigrant.

Johnson's poetry was published in Canada, the United States, and Great Britain. She was among a generation of widely-read writers who began to define Canadian literature. She was a key figure in the construction of the field as an institution and has made an indelible mark on Indigenous women's literature and theater.

Johnson was notable for her poems, short stories, and performances that celebrated her mixed-race heritage, drawing from both Indigenous and English influences. She is most known for her books of poetry The White Wampum (1895), Canadian Born (1903), and Flint and Feather (1912); and her collections of stories Legends of Vancouver (1911), The Shagganappi (1913), and The Moccasin Maker (1913). While her literary reputation declined after her death, since the late 20th century there has been a renewed interest in her life and works. In 2002, a complete collection of her known poetry was published, entitled E. Pauline Johnson, Tekahionwake: Collected Poems and Selected Prose.

== Personal life ==
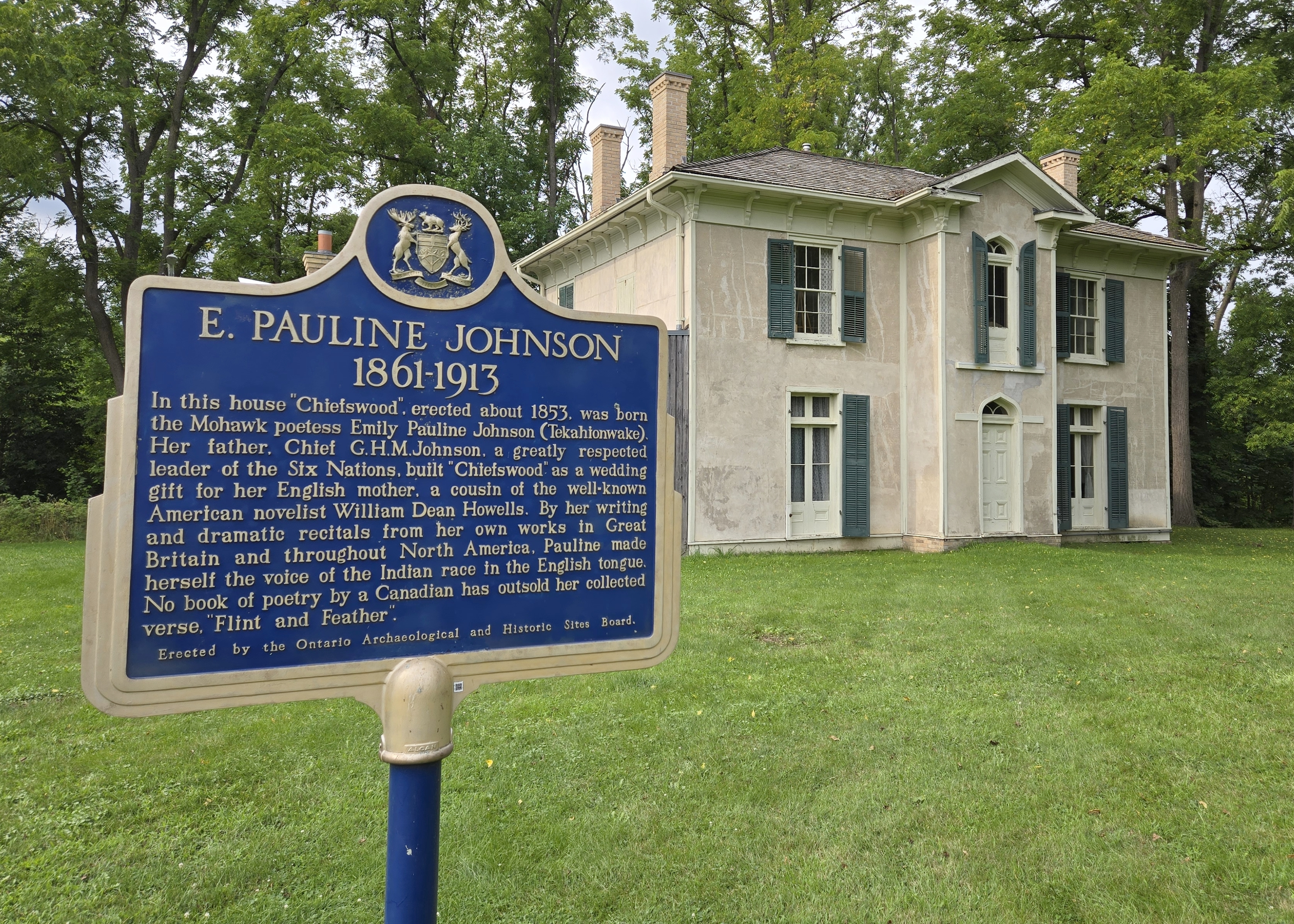
Chiefswood

=== Early life ===
Emily Pauline Johnson was born on 10 March 1861 at Chiefswood, her family home on the Six Nations reserve near Brantford, Ontario. She was the youngest of four children of Emily Susanna Howells Johnson, an English immigrant, and George Henry Martin Johnson, a Mohawk hereditary clan chief.

Her father worked as an interpreter, acting as a link between Mohawk communities, British officials, and representatives of the Canadian government. Because of this, the Johnson family held a prominent social position. Their home at Chiefswood received notable visitors, including the Governor General of Canada and inventor Alexander Graham Bell.

Johnson grew up in a household shaped by both Mohawk and Victorian English traditions. Her mother emphasized discipline, manners, and social presentation, while her father encouraged his children to understand and navigate both their Mohawk and English heritage.

Her early life was also shaped by differing systems of identity. Under Canadian law, the Johnson children were considered Mohawk and wards of the Crown. However, in Mohawk society, identity and clan membership were passed through the mother. As a result, Johnson and her siblings did not belong to a Mohawk clan and were excluded from some aspects of community and ceremonial life.

=== Early education ===
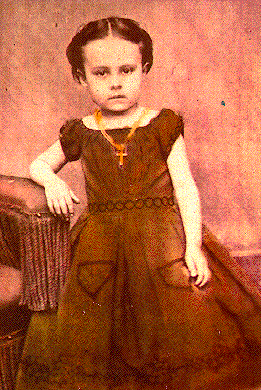
Johnson as a child

A sickly child, Johnson did not attend Brantford's Mohawk Institute, a residential school established in 1834. Her education was mostly at home and informal, derived from her mother, a series of non-Native governesses, a few years at the small school on the reserve, and self-guided reading in her family's expansive library. She read deeply in the works of Byron, Tennyson, Keats, Browning and Milton, and enjoyed reading tales about Indigenous people such as Longfellow's epic poem The Song of Hiawatha and John Richardson's Wacousta. These informed her own literary and theatrical work.

Her paternal grandfather John Smoke Johnson was a respected authority figure for Johnson and her siblings. He educated them by traditional Indigenous oral storytelling before his death in 1886. Johnson taught his life lessons and stories in Mohawk; the children understood it but were not fluent in speaking it. Smoke Johnson's dramatic talents as a storyteller were absorbed by Pauline, who became known for her talent for elocution and her stage performances. Later in her life, Johnson expressed regret for not learning more of her grandfather's Mohawk heritage and language.

At the age of 14, Johnson went to Brantford Central Collegiate with her brother Allen. She graduated in 1877.

=== Romantic life ===
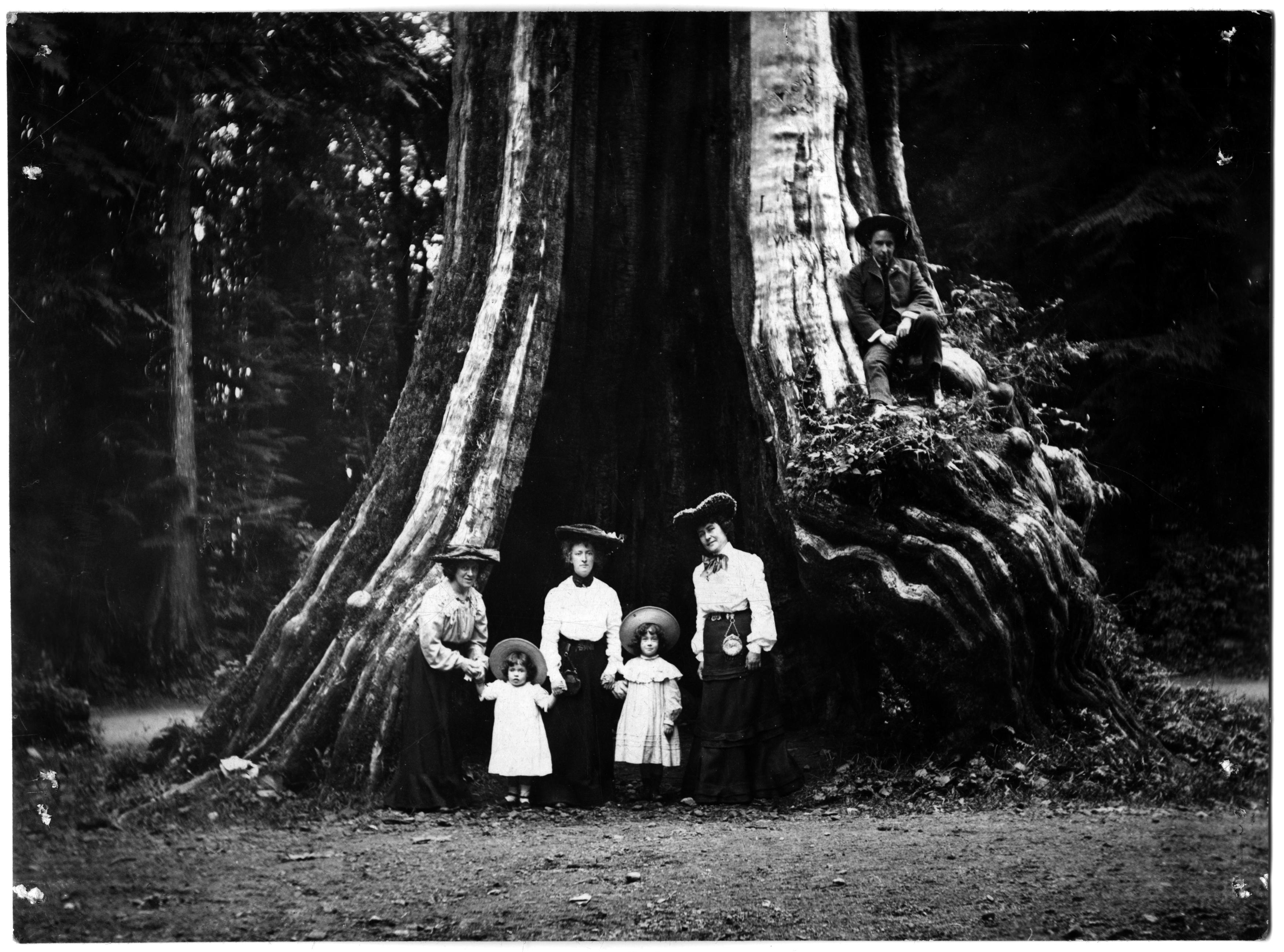
E. Pauline Johnson and friends

Johnson attracted many potential suitors, and her sister recalled more than half a dozen marriage proposals from Euro-Canadians in her lifetime. Though the number of official romantic interests remains unknown, two later romances were identified as Charles R. L. Drayton in 1890 and Charles Wuerz in 1900. But, Johnson never married nor remained in relationships for very long. She was said to have flirted with boys in Grand River. Later she wrote what was described as "intensely erotic poetry." Due to her career, she was unwilling to set aside her racial heritage and adapt to placate partners or in-laws. Despite everything, Johnson consistently had a strong network of supportive female friends and attested to the importance they had in her life.

Johnson said:

Women are fonder of me than men are. I have had none fail me, and I hope I have failed none. It is a keen pleasure for me to meet a congenial woman, one that I feel will understand me, and will in turn let me peep into her own life- having confidence in me, that is one of the dearest things between friends, strangers, acquaintances, or kindred.

== Stage career ==
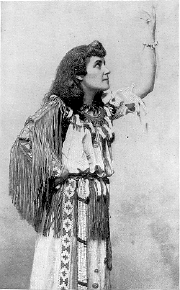
E. Pauline Johnson posing in her "Indian" costume

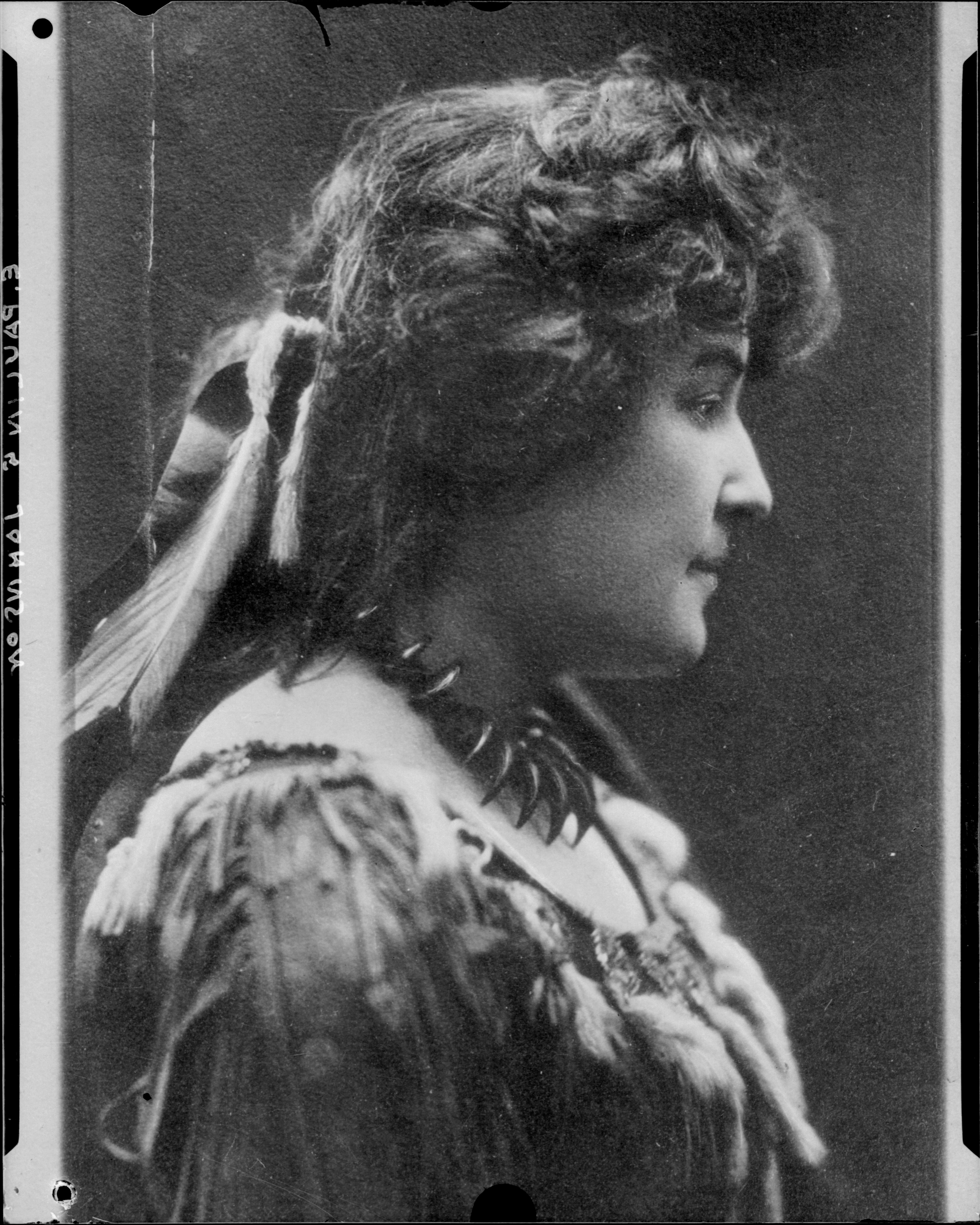
E. Pauline Johnson (Tekahionwake), [ca. 1900] - June 1929

During the 1880s, Johnson wrote and performed in amateur theatre productions. She enjoyed the Canadian outdoors, where she travelled by canoe. Shortly after her father's death in 1884, the family rented out Chiefswood. Johnson moved with her widowed mother and sister to a modest home in Brantford. She worked to support them all, and found that her stage performances enabled her to make a living. Johnson supported her mother until her death in 1898.

The Young Men's Liberal Association invited Johnson to a Canadian authors evening in 1892 at the Toronto Art School Gallery. The only woman at the event, she read to an overflow crowd, along with poets including William Douw Lighthall, William Wilfred Campbell, and Duncan Campbell Scott. "The poise and grace of this beautiful young woman standing before them captivated the audience even before she began to recite—not read, as the others had done"—her "Cry from an Indian Wife". She was the only author to be called back for an encore. "She had scored a personal triumph and saved the evening from turning into a disaster." The success of this performance began the poet's 15-year stage career.

Johnson was signed up by Frank Yeigh, who had organized the Liberal event. He gave her the headline for her first show on 19 February 1892, where she made her debut with a new poem written for the event, "The Song My Paddle Sings".

At 31 years old, Johnson was perceived as a young and exotic Native beauty. After her first recital season, she decided to emphasize the Native aspects of her public persona in her theatrical performances. Johnson created a two-part act that would confound the dichotomy of her European and Indigenous background. In act one, Johnson would appear as Tekahionwake, the Mohawk name of her great-grandfather, wearing a costume that served as a pastiche and assemblage of generic "Indian" objects that did not belong to one single nation. But, her costume from 1892 to 1895 included items she had received from Mohawk and other sources, such as scalps inherited from her grandfather that hung from her wampum belt, spiritual masks, and other paraphernalia. During this act she would recite dramatic "Indian" lyrics.

At intermission, she changed into fashionable English dress. In act two, she came out as a pro-North West Mounted Police (now known as the RCMP) Victorian English woman to recite her "English" verse. Many of the items on her native dress were sold to museums such as the Ontario Provincial Museum, or to collectors such as the prominent American George Gustav Heye. Upon her death she willed her "Indian" costume to the Museum of Vancouver.

There are many interpretations of Johnson's performances. The artist is quoted saying "I may act till the world grows wild and tense". Her shows were tremendously popular. She toured all across North America with her friend and fellow performer, and later business manager, Walter MacRaye. Her popularity was part of the immense interest by European Americans and Europeans in Indigenous peoples throughout the 19th century; the 1890s were also the period of popularity of Buffalo Bill's Wild West show and ethnological aboriginal exhibits.

== Literary career ==
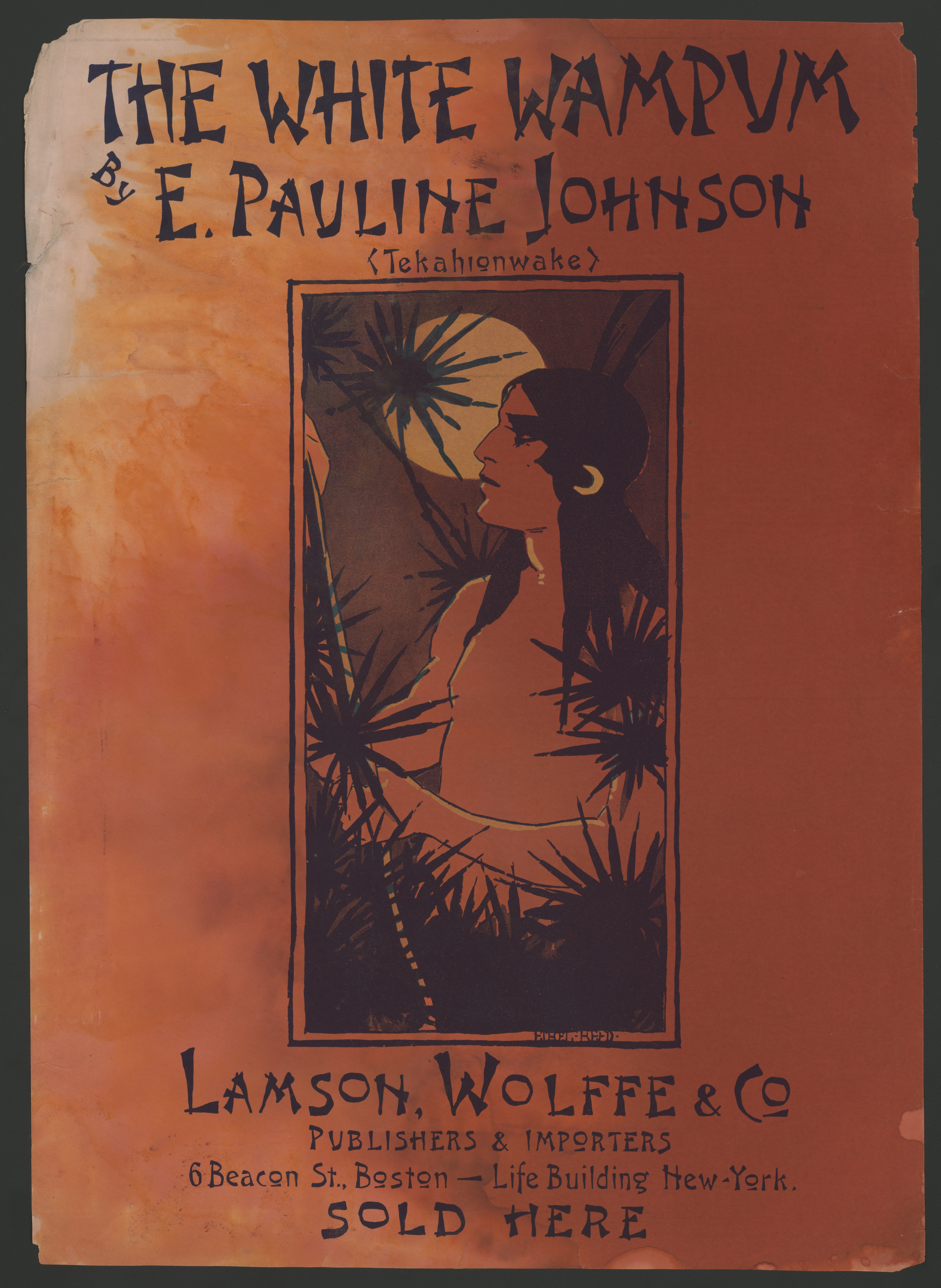
The White Wampum (1895)

In 1883 Johnson published her first full-length poem, "My Little Jean", in the New York magazine Gems of Poetry. She began to increase the pace of her writing and publishing afterwards.

In 1885, poet Charles G. D. Roberts published Johnson's "A Cry from an Indian Wife" in The Week, Goldwin Smith's Toronto magazine. She based it on events of the battle of Cut Knife Creek during the Riel Rebellion. Roberts and Johnson became lifelong friends. Johnson promoted her identity as a Mohawk, but as an adult spent little time with people of that culture. In 1885, Johnson travelled to Buffalo, New York, to attend a ceremony honouring the Haudenosaunee leader Sagoyewatha, also known as Red Jacket. She wrote a poem expressing admiration for him and a plea for reconciliation between British and Native peoples.

In 1886, Johnson was commissioned to write a poem to mark the unveiling in Brantford of a statue honouring Joseph Brant, the important Mohawk leader who was allied with the British during and after the American Revolutionary War. Her "Ode to Brant" was read at a 13 October ceremony before "the largest crowd the little city had ever seen". It called for brotherhood between Native and white Canadians under British imperial authority. The poem sparked a long article in the Toronto Globe, and increased interest in Johnson's poetry and heritage. The Brantford businessman William Foster Cockshutt read the poem at the ceremony, as Johnson was reportedly too shy.

During the 1880s, Johnson built her reputation as a Canadian writer, regularly publishing in periodicals such as Globe, The Week, and Saturday Night. In the late 1880s and early 1890s, she published nearly every month, mostly in Saturday Night. Johnson is considered among a group of Canadian authors who were contributing to a distinct national literature. The inclusion of two of her poems in W. D. Lighthall's anthology, Songs of the Great Dominion (1889), signalled her recognition. Theodore Watts-Dunton noted her for praise in his review of the book; he quoted her entire poem "In the Shadows" and called her "the most interesting poetess now living". In her early works, Johnson wrote mostly about Canadian life, landscapes, and love in a post-Romantic mode, reflective of literary interests shared with her mother, rather than her Mohawk heritage.

After retiring from the stage in August 1909, Johnson moved to Vancouver, British Columbia, where she continued writing. Her pieces included a series of articles for the Daily Province, based on stories related by her friend Chief Joe Capilano of the Squamish people of North Vancouver. In 1911, to help support Johnson, who was ill and poor, a group of friends organized the publication of these stories under the title Legends of Vancouver. They remain classics of that city's literature.

One of the stories was a Squamish legend of shape shifting: how a man was transformed into Siwash Rock "as an indestructible monument to Clean Fatherhood". In another, Johnson told the history of Deadman's Island, a small islet off Stanley Park. In a poem in the collection, she named one of her favourite areas "Lost Lagoon", as the inlet seemed to disappear when the water emptied at low tide. The body of water has since been transformed into a permanent, fresh-water lake at Stanley Park, but it is still called Lost Lagoon.

Johnson drew on her mixed ethnic background and cultural heritages as a major theme in her work. The heroine of her short story "The De Lisle Affair" (1897), was disguised. Readers were discomforted due to the uncertainty of appearances, particularly amongst women. Due to their subordinated social, economic, and political positions, women often had to play the roles as mediators for men, practising ambiguity and disloyalty for the sake of their safety and sanctity. The notion of shifting identity is seen in "The Ballad of Yaada" (1913), where a female character explains "not to friend – but unto foeman I belong ... though you hate, / I still must love him," which suggests the potential for communities to understand one another through love and kindness. But she also explores the risk of the coming together of communities and cultures. Johnson's mixed-race heroine Esther, in "As It Was in the Beginning", kills her unfaithful White lover. With the words "I am a Redskin, but I am something else, too – I am a woman", Esther is demanding recognition of multiple subjectivities. Johnson was trying to convey that the real world consists of much more than oppressive ideologies and artificial divisions of race and nation enforced by authoritative figures such as the racist Protestant minister in this story, revealingly nicknamed "St Paul" after the biblical misogynist.

The posthumous Shagganappi (1913) and The Moccasin Maker (1913) are collections of selected stories first published in periodicals. Johnson wrote on a variety of sentimental, didactic, and biographical topics. Veronica Strong-Boag and Carole Gerson provided a provisional chronological list of Johnson's writings in their book Paddling Her Own Canoe: The Times and Texts of E. Pauline Johnson (Tekahionwake) (2000).

== Death ==
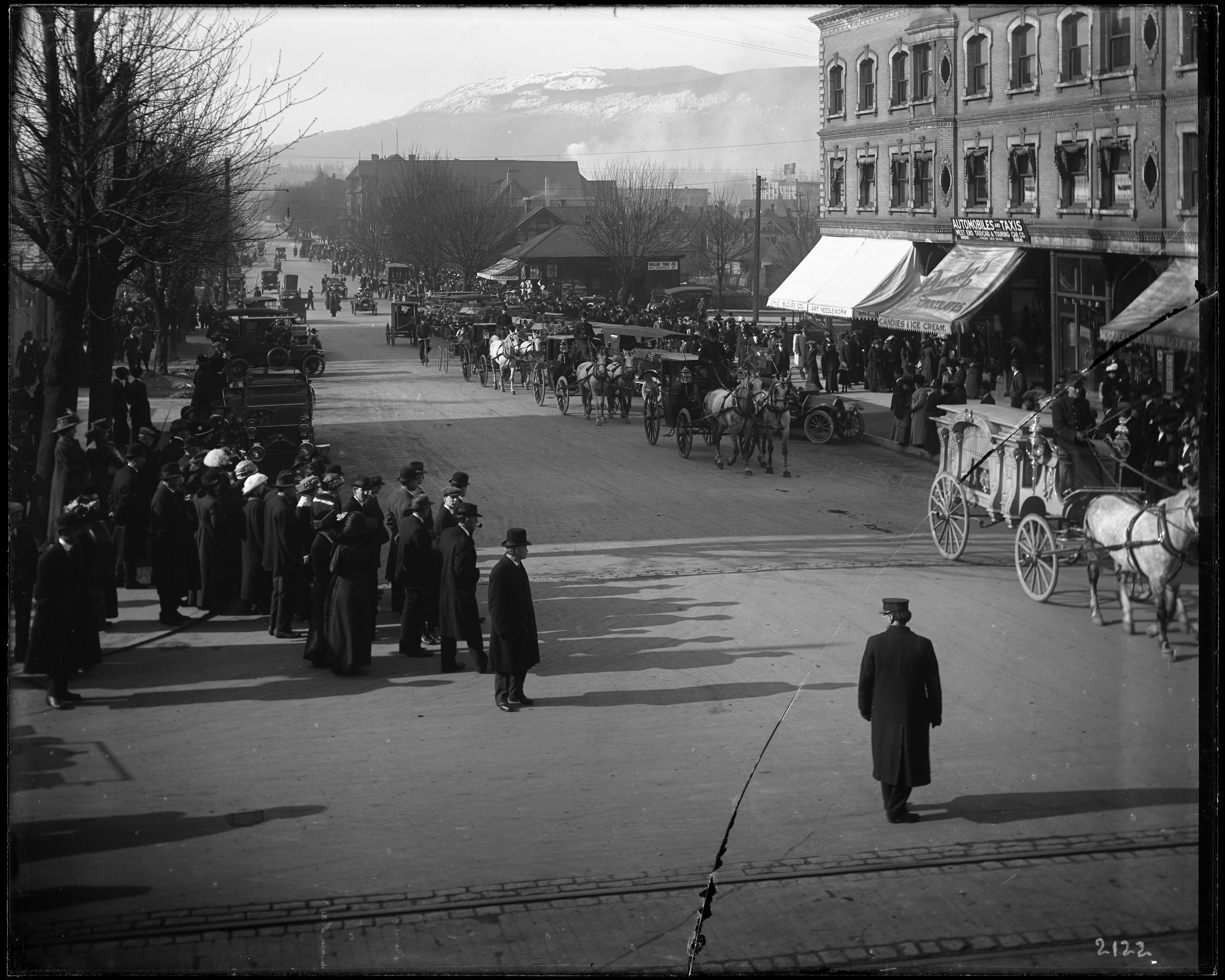
E. Pauline Johnson's funeral procession

Johnson died of breast cancer on 7 March 1913 in Vancouver, British Columbia. Devotion to her persisted after her death. Her funeral was held on what would have been her 52nd birthday. It was the largest public funeral in Vancouver history to that time. The city closed its offices and flew flags at half-mast; a memorial service was held in Vancouver's most prestigious church, the Anglican cathedral supervised by the Women's Canadian Club. Squamish people also lined the streets and followed her funeral cortege on 10 March 1913. The Vancouver Province headline on the day of her funeral said, "Canada's poetess is laid to rest". Smaller memorial services were also held in Brantford, Ontario, organized by Euro-Canadian admirers.

Johnson's ashes were placed in Stanley Park near Siwash Rock, through the special intervention of the governor general, the Duke of Connaught, who had visited during her final illness, and Sam Hughes, the minister of militia.

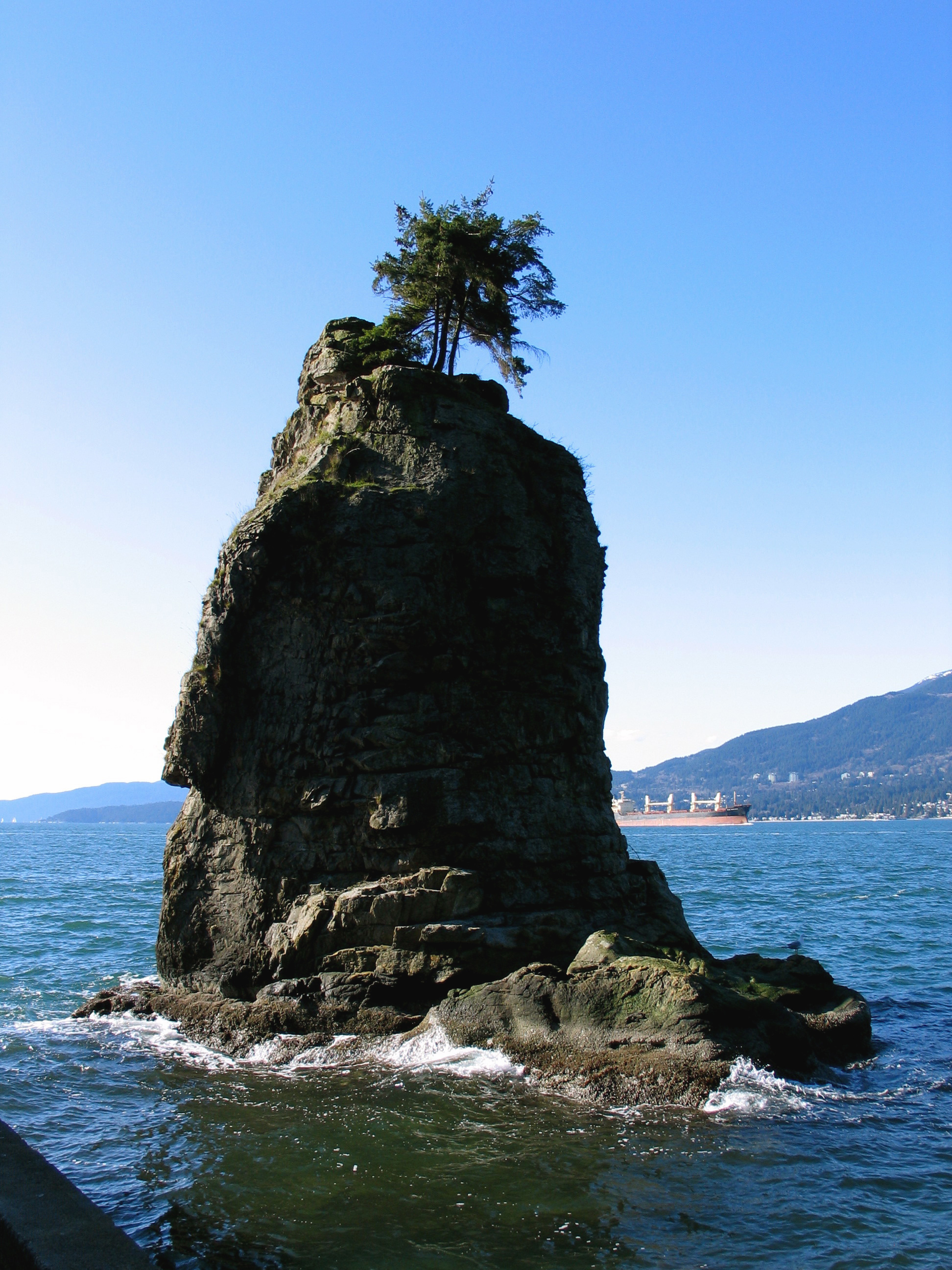
Siwash Rock Vancouver

Her will was prepared by the prestigious firm of Sir Charles Hibbert Tupper, son of the former 6th prime minister of Canada. Despite Johnson's preference for an unmarked grave, the Women's Canadian Club sought to raise money for a monument for her. In 1922, a cairn was erected at her burial site with the inscription stating, in part, "In memory of one whose life and writings were an uplift and a blessing to our nation". During World War One, part of the royalties from Legends of Vancouver went to purchase a machine gun inscribed "Tekahionwake" for the 29th Battalion of the Canadian Expeditionary Force. Johnson left a mark on Canadian history that has carried on long after her death.

== Reception ==
Scholars have had difficulty identifying Johnson's complete works, as much was published in periodicals. Her first volume of poetry, The White Wampum, was published in London in 1895. It was followed by Canadian Born in 1903. The contents of these volumes, together with additional poems, were published as the collection Flint and Feather in 1912. Reprinted many times, this book has been one of the best-selling titles of Canadian poetry. Since the 1917 edition, Flint and Feather has been misleadingly subtitled The Complete Poems of E. Pauline Johnson.

But in 2002, professors Carole Gerson and Veronica Strong-Boag produced an edition, Tekahionwake: Collected Poems and Selected Prose, that contains all of Johnson's poems found up to that date. A number of biographers and literary critics have downplayed her literary contributions, as they contend that her performances contributed most to her literary reputation during her lifetime. W. J. Keith wrote: "Pauline Johnson's life was more interesting than her writing ... with ambitions as a poet, she produced little or nothing of value in the eyes of critics who emphasize style rather than content."

Despite the acclaim she received from contemporaries, Johnson had a decline in reputation in the decades after her death. It was not until 1961, with commemoration of the centenary of her birth, that Johnson began to be recognized as an important Canadian cultural figure. This was also the beginning of a period when the writing of women and First Nations people began to be re-evaluated and recognized.

Canadian author Margaret Atwood admitted that she did not study literature by Native authors when preparing Survival: A Thematic Guide to Canadian Literature (1972), her seminal work. At its publication, she had said she could not find Native works. She mused, "Why did I overlook Pauline Johnson? Perhaps because, being half-white, she somehow didn't rate as the real thing, even among Natives; although she is undergoing reclamation today." Atwood's comments indicated that Johnson's multicultural identity contributed to her neglect by critics.

As Atwood noted, since the late 20th century, Johnson's writings and performance career have been reevaluated by literary, feminist, and postcolonial critics. They have appreciated her importance as a New Woman and a figure of resistance to dominant ideas about race, gender, Native Rights, and Canada. The growth in literature written by First Nations people during the 1980s and 1990s has also prompted writers and scholars to investigate Native oral and written literary history, to which Johnson made a significant contribution.

Johnson has received much less attention than one might expect for an accomplished and controversial literary figure. Older critics often dismissed Johnson's work; in 1988 critic Charles Lillard characterized her readers dismissively as "tourists, grandmothers ... and the curious". In 1992, a Specialized Catalogue of Canadian Stamps, issued by Canada Post misrepresented Johnson as a "Mohawk Princess", ignoring her scholarly accomplishments. And in 1999 Patrick Watson introduced the History Channel's biography of Johnson by deprecating "The Song My Paddle Sings". Even in regard to scholarship, Johnson was often overlooked in the 1980s in favour of Duncan Campbell Scott for writing about indigenous life, although he was Euro-Canadian. But a new generation of feminist scholars has begun to counter narratives of Canadian literary history and Johnson is being recognised for her literary efforts.

An examination of the reception of Johnson's oeuvre over time traces the change in notions of literary value and the shifting demarcation between high and popular culture. During her lifetime, this line scarcely existed in Canada, where nationalism prevailed as the primary evaluative criterion. The Vancouver Province headline on the day of her funeral in March 1913 stated simply: "Canada's poetess is laid to rest". During the following decade, an "elegiac quality often imbued references to Pauline Johnson". To Euro-Canadians, she was considered the last spokesperson for a people destined to disappear: "The time must come for us to go down, and when it comes, may we have the strength to meet our fate with such fortitude and silent dignity as did the Red Man his."

In the 21st century, some have questioned the moral ambiguity of Johnson's work, and asked whether she herself was racist. In 2017, school administrators at the High Park Alternative Public School in Toronto characterized the song "Land of the Silver Birch" as racist, mistakenly asserting that Johnson wrote the poem on which the song is based. In a letter to parents, they said, "While its lyrics are not overtly racist [...] the historical context of the song is racist." Some experts disagreed with this assertion, and the music teacher, who arranged for the song to be performed at a school concert, sued the administration for defamation.

== Legacy ==
=== Canadian literature ===
A 1997 survey by Hartmut Lutz of the state of Canadian Native Literature in the 1960s, pointed to the importance of this era as establishing the foundation for the new wave of Indigenous writing that surged in the 1980s and 1990s. Lutz identified "1967 as the beginning of contemporary writing by Native authors in Canada", marking the publication of George Clutesi's landmark work, Son of Raven, Son of Deer. His discussion briefly mentioned Johnson but he did not acknowledge that 1961 marked the centennial of Johnson's birth; the resulting celebration nationally demonstrated the endurance of her prominence in Indigenous and Canadian literature and popular culture.

As a writer and performer, Johnson was a central figure in literary and performance history of Indigenous women in Canada. Of her importance, Mohawk writer Beth Brant wrote "Pauline Johnson's physical body died in 1913, but her spirit still communicates to us who are Native women writers. She walked the writing path clearing the brush for us to follow."

Johnson influence over other female Indigenous Canadian writers was expressed by their references to her throughout various decades, for example:

- 1989 - Poet Joan Crate (Metis) referred to Johnson in the title of her book of poetry Pale as Real Ladies: Poems for Pauline Johnson.
- 2000 - Jeannette Armstrong (Okanagan) opened her novel Whispering in Shadows with Johnson's poem "Moonset".
- 2002 - Poet Janet Rogers (Mohawk) published her play Pauline and Emily, Two Women, recasting Johnson as a friend and interlocutor of Canadian artist Emily Carr, who often painted Indigenous life as decayed and dying.
- 1993 - Shelley Niro (Mohawk) made a film, It Starts With a Whisper, that includes a reading of Johnson's "The Song My Paddle Sings".

Broadcaster Rosanna Deerchild (Cree) remembers stumbling across "The Cattle Thief" in the public library: "I hand-copied that entire poem right then and there and carried it around with me, reading it over and over." Later she wrote a poem about Johnson entitled "she writes us alive." There are numerous other examples of contemporary Indigenous artists, women and men alike, who were inspired by Johnson, notably within Canadian literature.

=== Canadian government ===
In the 19th and early 20th centuries, government policies towards Indigenous Canadians were increasingly cruel. Across the continent, Indigenous children were forcibly removed to residential schools; on the Prairies, communities such as the Dogrib, Cree and Blackfoot were confined to artificial reserves; settler attitudes towards the Dominion's original inhabitants curdled and hardened. Johnson critiqued some Canadian policies that resulted in such legalized and justified mistreatment of Indigenous peoples. For example, in her poem "A Cry From an Indian Wife", the final verse reads:

Go forth, nor bend to greed of white men's hands,
By right, by birth we Indians own these lands,
Though starved, crushed, plundered, lies our nation low ...
Perhaps the white man's God has willed it so.

Because of the Indian Act and faulty scientific blood quantum racial determinism, Johnson was often belittled by the term "halfbreed".

== Awards and honours ==
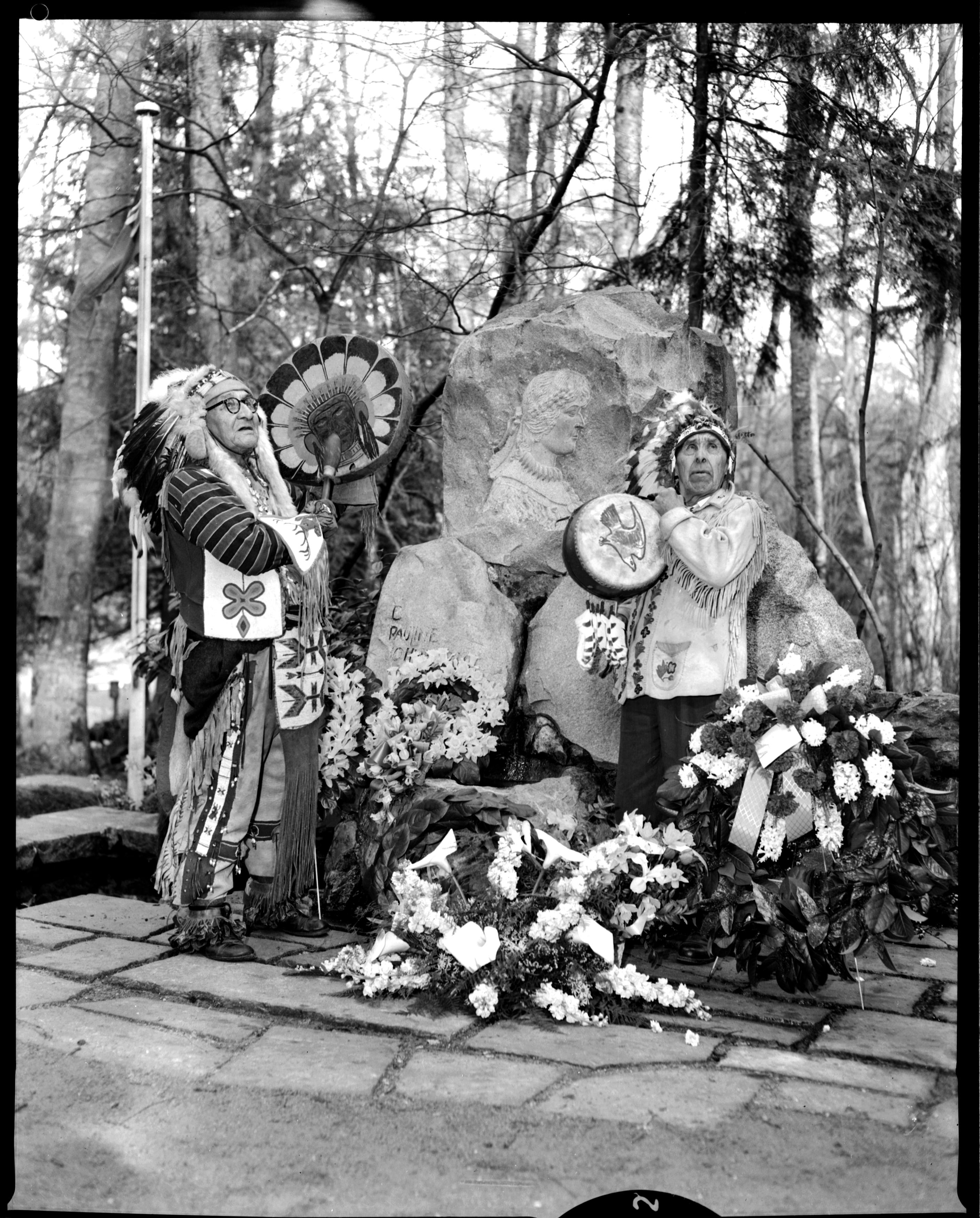
Mathias Joe and Dominic Charlie at the Pauline Johnson Memorial

=== Monuments and memorial sites ===
- After Pauline Johnson died in Vancouver, her ashes were buried in Stanley Park near Siwash Rock. A large public funeral procession accompanied the burial. She is one of the very few people whose remains were allowed to be buried in the park. (1913)
- A monument to Johnson was later erected in Stanley Park near the place where she was buried. The memorial recognizes her strong connection to Vancouver during the last years of her life and remains one of the park's notable literary memorials. (1922)

=== Historic designations ===
- The Government of Canada recognized Johnson's importance to Canadian history by designating her a Person of National Historic Significance. (1945)
- Chiefswood, Johnson's childhood home on the Six Nations reserve near Brantford, Ontario, was designated a National Historic Site. The house was built in 1856 by her father, Mohawk Chief George Henry Martin Johnson, and is now preserved as a museum. It is one of the oldest surviving Indigenous family homes in Canada from before Confederation. (1953)
- The Province of Ontario installed an Ontario Historical Plaque at the Chiefswood house museum to recognize Johnson's role in the region's cultural and literary history. (2004)

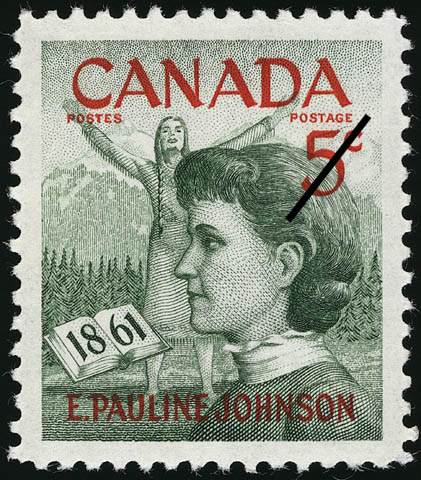
E. Pauline Johnson 1961 stamp

=== National recognition ===
- Canada Post issued a commemorative postage stamp with Johnson's portrait to mark the 100th anniversary of her birth. She was the first woman other than the reigning monarch, the first author, and the first Indigenous Canadian to appear on a Canadian stamp. (1961)
- Johnson was one of five finalists considered for inclusion on Canadian banknotes in a national process to select a historically significant Canadian woman. Viola Desmond was ultimately chosen for the note. (2016)

=== Institutions named in her honour ===
- Several Canadian schools were named after Johnson, including elementary schools in West Vancouver, Scarborough, Hamilton, and Burlington, as well as Pauline Johnson Collegiate and Vocational School in Brantford, Ontario, near the Six Nations community where she was born.

=== Artistic works inspired by her life and poetry ===
- During the opening ceremony of the Winter Olympics in Vancouver, Canadian actor Donald Sutherland read lines from Johnson's poem Autumn's Orchestra as part of the cultural program. (2010)
- Composer Jeff Enns created a choral setting of Johnson's poem At Sunset. The work was performed and recorded by the Canadian Chamber Choir under the direction of Julia Davids. (2010)
- The City Opera of Vancouver commissioned Pauline, a chamber opera about Johnson's life and identity. The opera, with music by Tobin Stokes and a libretto by Margaret Atwood, premiered at the York Theatre in Vancouver. (2014)
- Canadian composer Timothy Corlis wrote Songs of the White Wampum, a musical work based on five of Johnson's poems. It was commissioned by the Electra Women's Choir through a Canada Council grant. (2015)

== Complete literary works ==
=== Dated publications ===
This list cites the first known publication of individual texts, as well as first appearance in one of Johnson's books, based on the work of Veronica Jane Strong-Boag and Carole Gerson.

- 1883
  - Gems of Poetry
    - "My Little Jean"
- 1884
  - Gems of Poetry
    - "The Rift. By Margaret Rox"
    - "Rover"
  - Transactions of the Buffalo Historic Society
    - "The Re-interment of Red Jacket"
- 1885
  - Gems of Poetry
    - "Iris to Floretta"
    - "The Sea Queen"
  - The Week
    - "The Sea Queen"
    - "A Cry from an Indian Wife"
    - "In the Shadows"
- 1886
  - Souvenir pamphlet
    - "'Brant', A Memorial Ode"
  - The Week
    - "The Firs"
    - "Easter Lilies"
    - "At the Ferry"
    - "A Request"
- 1887
  - Musical Journal
    - "Life"
  - The Week
    - "The Vigil of St Basil" retitled "Fasting"
- 1888
  - Saturday Night
    - "My English Letter"
    - "Easter, 1888"
    - "Unguessed"
    - "The Death-Cry"
    - "Keepsakes"
    - "The Flight of the Crows"
    - "Under Canvas"
    - "Workworn"
    - "A Backwoods Christmas" retitled "The Lumberman's Christmas"
  - The Week
    - "Joe" retitled "Joe: An Etching"
    - "Our Brotherhood"
- 1889
  - Globe
    - "Evergreens"
  - Saturday Night
    - "The Happy Hunting Grounds"
    - "Close By"
    - "Ungranted" retitled "Overlooked"
    - "Old Erie" retitled "Erie Waters"
    - "Shadow River"
    - "Bass Lake (Muskoka)"
    - "Temptation"
    - "Fortune's Favors"
    - "Rondeau"
    - "Christmastide"
  - The Week
    - "Nocturne"
- 1890
  - Brantford Courier
    - "Charming Word Pictures. Etchings by an Idler of Muskoka and the Beautiful North"
    - "Charming Word Pictures. Etchings by a Muskoka Idler"
    - "Charming Word Pictures. Etchings by a Muskoka Idler"
  - Saturday Night
    - "We Three" retitled "Beyond the Blue"
    - "In April"
    - "For Queen and Country"
    - "Back Number [Chief of the Six Nations]"
    - "The Idlers"
    - "With Paddle and Peterboro"
    - "Depths"
    - "Day Dawn"
    - "'Held by the Enemy'"
    - "With Canvas Overhead"
    - "Two Women"
    - "A Day's Frog Fishing"
    - "In October" retitled "October in Canada"
    - "Thro' Time and Bitter Distance" retitled "Through Time and Bitter Distance"
    - "As Red Men Die"
- 1891
  - Brantford Expositor
    - "A'bram"
  - Dominion Illustrated
    - "Our Iroquois Compatriots"
  - Independent
    - "Re-Voyage"
    - "At Husking Time"
  - Outing
    - "The Camper"
    - "Ripples and Paddle Plashes: A Canoe Story"
  - Saturday Night
    - "The Last Page"
    - "The Showshoer"
    - "Outlooking"
    - "The Seventh Day"
    - "The Vagabonds"
    - "Prone on the Earth"
    - "In Days to Come"
    - "Striking Camp"
    - "The Pilot of the Plains"
  - Weekly Detroit Free Press
    - "Canoeing"
  - Young Canadian
    - "Star Lake"
- 1892
  - Belford's Magazine
    - "Wave-Won"
  - Brantford Expositor
    - "Forty-Five Miles on the Grand"
  - Dominion Illustrated
    - "Indian Medicine Men and their Magic"
  - Lake Magazine
    - "Penseroso"
  - Outing
    - "Outdoor Pastimes for Women"
  - Saturday Night
    - "A Story of a Boy and a Dog"
    - "Rondeau. The Skater"
    - "Glimpse at the Grand River Indians"
    - "The Song My Paddle Sings"
    - "At Sunset"
    - "Rainfall"
    - "Sail and Paddle"
    - "The Avenger"
  - Sunday Globe
    - "A Strong Race Opinion: on the Indian Girl in Modern Fiction"
  - Weekly Detroit Free Press
    - "On Wings of Steel"
    - "A Brother Chief"
    - "The Game of Lacrosse"
    - "Reckless Young Canada"
- 1893
  - American Canoe Club Yearbook
    - "The Portage"
  - Canadian Magazine
    - "The Birds' Lullaby"
  - Dominion Illustrated
    - "A Red Girl's Reasoning" retitled "A Sweet Wild Flower"
  - Illustrated Buffalo Express
    - "Sail and Paddle. The Annual Meeting of the Canoe Association"
  - Outing
    - "Outdoor Pastimes for Women", columns in the Monthly Record
    - "A Week in the 'Wild Cat'"
  - Saturday Night
    - "The Mariner"
    - "Brier"
    - "Canoe and Canvas"
    - "Princes of the Paddle"
    - "Wolverine"
  - Weekly Detroit Free Press
    - "The Song My Paddle Sings", retitled "Canoeing in Canada"
- 1894
  - Acta Victoriana
    - "In Freshet Time"
    - Art Calendar, illustrated by Robert Holmes
    - "Thistledown"
  - Globe
    - "There and Back, by Miss Poetry (E. Pauline Johnson), and Mr Prose (Owen A. Smily)", 15 December, 3–4.
  - Harper's Weekly
    - "The Iroquois of the Grand River"
  - Ladies' Journal
    - "In Gray Days"
  - Outing
    - "Moon-Set"
  - The Varsity
    - "Marsh-Lands"
  - The Week
    - "The Cattle Thief"
- 1895
  - Black and White
    - "The Lifting of the Mist"
  - Brantford Expositor
    - "The Six Nations"
  - Globe
    - "The Races in Prose and Verse, by Miss Poetry and Mr Prose"
  - Halifax Herald
    - "Iroquois Women of Canada"
  - Our Animal Friends
    - "From the Country of the Cree"
  - The Rudder
    - "Sou'wester"
    - "Canoe and Canvas. I"
    - "Canoe and Canvas. II"
    - "Canoe and Canvas. Ill"
    - "Canoe and Canvas. IV"
    - "Becalmed"
  - The Year Book
    - "The White and the Green"
  - The White Wampum
    - Previous publication unknown: "Dawendine", "Ojistoh"
- 1896
  - Black and White
    - "Low Tide at St Andrews"
    - "The Quill Worker"
  - Daily Mail and Empire
    - "The Good Old N.P."
  - Harper's Weekly
    - "Lullaby of the Iroquois"
    - "The Corn Husker"
  - Massey's Magazine
    - "The Singer of Tantramar"
    - "The Songster"
    - "The Derelict"
  - Our Animal Friends
    - "A Glimpse of the Prairie Wolf"
  - The Rudder
    - "With Barry in the Bow. Act I. Scene: The Land of Evangeline"
    - "With Barry in the Bow. Act II. Scene: The Great North Land"
    - "With Barry in the Bow. Interlude between Acts II and III"
    - "The American Canoe Association at Grindstone Island"
- 1897
  - Ludgate Magazine
    - "Gambling among the Iroquois"
  - Massey's Magazine
    - "The Indian Corn Planter"
  - Our Animal Friends
    - "In Gopher-Land"
  - The Rudder
    - "With Barry in the Bow. Act III. Scene: The Land of the Setting Sun"
    - "With Barry in the Bow. Act IV"
    - "With Barry in the Bow. Act V"
  - Saturday Night
    - "The De Lisle Affair"
- 1898
  - Canada
    - "Organization of the Iroquois"
  - Town Topics
    - "The Indian Legend of Qu'Appelle Valley", retitled "The Legend of Qu'Appelle Valley"
- 1899
  - Free Press Home Journal (Winnipeg)
    - "'Give Us Barabbas'"
  - Globe
    - "H.M.S."
  - Saturday Night
    - "As It Was in the Beginning"
  - Town Topics
    - "Some People I Have Met"
- 1900
  - Halifax Herald
    - "Canadian Born"
- 1901
  - "His Majesty the King"
- 1902
  - Evening News
    - "Letter to the Editor" (about Wacousta)
    - "Our Sister of the Seas"
    - "Among the Blackfoots"
  - Smart Set
    - "The Prodigal"
- 1903
  - Canadian Born
    - Previous publication unknown: "The Art of Alma-Tadema", "At Half-Mast", "The City and The Sea", "Golden – Of the Selkirks", "Good-Bye", "Guard of the Eastern Gate", "Lady Icicle", "Lady Lorgnette", "Prairie Greyhounds", "The Riders of the Plains" [performed 1899], "The Sleeping Giant", "A Toast", "Your Mirror Frame".
  - Saturday Night
    - "Made in Canada"
- 1904
  - Rod and Gun
    - "The Train Dogs"
- 1906
  - Black and White
    - "When George Was King"
    - Boys' World
    - "Maurice of His Majesty's Mails"
    - "The Saucy Seven"
    - "Dick Dines with his 'Dad'"
  - Daily Express (London)
    - "A Pagan in St. Paul's", retitled "A Pagan in St. Paul's Cathedral"
    - "The Lodge of the Law Makers"
    - "The Silent News Carriers"
    - "Sons of Savages"
  - Over-Seas
    - "The Traffic of the Trail"
    - "Newfoundland"
  - Saturday Night
    - "The Cariboo Trail"
  - Standard (Montreal)
    - "Chance of Newfoundland Joining Canada Switches Interest to Britain's Oldest Colony"
- 1907
  - Boys' World
    - "We-eho's Sacrifice", retitled "We-hro's Sacrifice"
    - "Gun-shy Billy"
    - "The Broken String"
    - "Little Wolf-Willow"
    - "The Shadow Trail"
  - Calgary Daily News
    - "The Man in Chrysanthemum Land"
  - Canada (London)
    - "Longboat of the Onondagas"
  - Canadian Magazine
    - "The Cattle Country", retitled "The Foothill Country"
    - "The Haunting Thaw"
    - "The Trail to Lillooet"
  - Mother's Magazine
    - "The Little Red Indian's Day"
    - "Her Dominion – A Story of 1867, and Canada's Confederation"
    - "The Home Comers"
    - "The Prayers of the Pagan"
- 1908
  - Boys' World
    - "A Night With 'North Eagle'"
    - "The Tribe of Tom Longboat"
    - "The Lieutenant Governor's Prize"
    - "Canada's Lacrosse"
    - "The Scarlet Eye"
    - "The Cruise of the 'Brown Owl'"
  - Brantford Daily Expositor
    - "Canada"
  - Mother's Magazine
    - "Mothers of a Great Red Race"
    - "Winter Indoor Life of the Indian Mother and Child"
    - "How One Resourceful Mother Planned an Inexpensive Outing"
    - "Outdoor Occupations of the Indian Mother and her Children", Heroic Indian Mothers
    - "Mother of the Motherless"
  - Saturday Night
    - "The Foothill Country", previously "The Cattle Country"
    - "The Southward Trail"
  - When George Was King, and Other Poems
    - "Autumn's Orchestra"
- 1909
  - Boys' World
    - "The Broken Barrels I"
    - "The Broken Barrels II"
    - "The Whistling Swans"
    - "The Delaware Idol"
    - "The King's Coin (Chapter One)"
    - "The King's Coin (Chapter Two)"
    - "The King's Coin (Chapter Three)"
    - "The King's Coin (Chapter Four)"
    - "The King's Coin (Chapter Five)"
    - "Jack O' Lantern I"
    - "Jack O' Lantern II"
  - Mother's Magazine
    - "The Legend of the Two Sisters", as "The True Legend of Vancouver Lions", Daily Province Magazine, 16 April 1910; retitled "The Two Sisters"
    - "Mother o' the Men"
    - "The Envoy Extraordinary"
    - "My Mother"
    - "The Christmas Heart"
  - Saturday Night
    - "The Chinook Wind"
- 1910
  - Boys' World
    - "The Brotherhood"
    - "The Wolf-Brothers"
    - "The Silver Craft of the Mohawks: The Protective Totem"
    - "The Silver Craft of the Mohawks: The Brooch of Brotherhood"
    - "The Silver Craft of the Mohawks: The Hunter's Heart"
    - "The Signal Code"
    - "England's Sailor King"
    - "The Barnardo Boy"
    - "A Chieftain Prince"
    - "The Potlatch"
    - "The Story of the First Telephone"
    - "The Silver Craft of the Mohawks: The Traitor's Hearts"
    - "The Silver Craft of the Mohawks: The Sun of Friendship"
    - "On My Honor"
  - Canadian Magazine
    - "The Homing Bee"
  - Daily Province Magazine
    - "The True Legend of Vancouver's Lions", retitled "The Two Sisters"
    - "The Duke of Connaught as Chief of the Iroquois", retitled "A Royal Mohawk Chief"
    - "A Legend of the Squamish", retitled "The Lost Island"
    - "A True Legend of Siwash Rock: a Monument to Clean Fatherhood", retitled "The Siwash Rock"
    - "The Recluse of the Capilano Canyon", retitled "The Recluse"
    - "A Legend of Deer Lake", retitled "Deer Lake"
    - "The 'Lure' in Stanley Park"
    - "The Deep Waters: A Rare Squamish Legend", retitled "The Great Deep Water: A Legend of 'The Flood'"
  - Mother's Magazine, February 1912; retitled "The Deep Waters"
    - "The Legend of the Lost Salmon Run", retitled "The Lost Salmon Run"
    - "The Sea Serpent of Brockton Point", retitled "The Sea Serpent"
    - "The Legend of the Seven White Swans"
    - "The True Legend of Deadman's Island", retitled "Deadman's Island"
    - "The Lost Lagoon"
    - "A Squamish Legend of Napoleon"
    - "The Orchard of Evangeline's Land"
    - "The Call of the Old Qu' Appelle Valley"
    - "Prairie and Foothill Animals That Despise the Southward Trail"
    - "Where the Horse is King"
    - "A Legend of Point Grey", retitled "Point Grey"
    - "The Great Heights above the Tulameen", retitled "The Tulameen Trail"
    - "Trails of the Old Tillicums"
  - Mother's Magazine
    - "The Nest Builder"
    - "The Call of the Skookum Chuck"
    - "From the Child's Viewpoint"
    - "The Grey Archway: A Legend of the Charlotte Islands"
    - "The Legend of the Squamish Twins", retitled "The Recluse of Capilano Canyon", retitled "The Recluse"
    - "The Lost Salmon Run: A Legend of the Pacific Coast", retitled "The Legend of the Lost Salmon Run"
  - Daily Province
    - "The Lost Salmon Run"
    - "The Legend of Siwash Rock"
    - "Catharine of the 'Crow's Nest'"
  - What to Do
    - "A Lost Luncheon"
    - "The Building Beaver"
- 1911
  - Legends of Vancouver
  - Boys' World
    - "The King Georgeman [I]"
    - "The King Georgeman [II]"
  - Daily Province Magazine
    - "The Grey Archway: A Legend of the Coast", retitled "The Grey Archway"
    - "The Great New Year White Dog: Sacrifice of the Onondagas"
  - Daily Province
    - "La Crosse"
  - Mother's Magazine
    - "Hoolool of the Totem Poles"
    - "The Tenas Klootchman"
    - "The Legend of the Seven Swans"
    - "The Legend of the Ice Babies"
- 1912
  - Flint and Feather
    - Previous publication unknown: "The Archers", "Brandon", "The King's Consort"
  - Mother's Magazine
    - "The Legend of Lillooet Falls"
    - "The Great Deep Water: A Legend of 'The Flood'"
  - Sun (Vancouver)
    - "The Unfailing Lamp"
- 1913
  - The Moccasin Maker
    - "Her Majesty's Guest"
  - The Shagganappi
    - "The Shagganappi"
  - Boys' World
    - "The Little Red Messenger [I]"
    - "The Little Red Messenger [II]"
  - Calgary Herald
    - "Calgary of the Plains"
  - Canadian Magazine
    - "Song"
    - "In Heidleberg"
    - "Aftermath"
  - Saturday Night
    - "The Ballad of Yaada"
  - Pamphlet (Toronto: Musson)
    - "And He Said, Fight On"
- 1914
  - Canadian Magazine
    - "Reclaimed Lands"
    - "Coaching on the Cariboo Trail"
  - Daily Province
    - "Coaching on the Cariboo Trail"
- 1916
  - Flint and Feather
    - "The Man from Chrysanthemum Land" (written for The Spectator)
- 1929
  - Town Hall Tonight by Walter McRaye
    - "To Walter McRaye"
- 1947
  - Pauline Johnson and Her Friends by McRaye
    - "The Ballad of Laloo"

=== Undated publications ===
==== Poems in the Chiefswood Scrapbook: c. 1884–1924 ====
- "Both Sides" New York Life, 1888
- "Comrades, we are serving" n.p., n.d.
- "Disillusioned" (second part "Both Sides") Judge, n.d.
- "Lent" signed Woeful Jack, n.p., n.d.
- "What the Soldier Said" Brant Churchman, n.d.

==== Clippings at McMaster University ====
- "In the Shadows. My Version. By the Pasha" n.p.
- "Traverse Bay" n.p.
- "Winnipeg – At Sunset" Free Press.
- "Interesting Description, by a Descendant of the Mohawks, of Tutela Heights, Ontario" Boston Evening Transcript.

=== Unpublished writings ===
==== Dated manuscripts ====
- 1876. "The Fourth Act"
- 1878. "Think of Me"
- 1879. "My Jeanie"
- 1890. "Dear little girl from far / Beyond the seas"
- 1901. "Morrowland" dated Holy Saturday
- 1906. "Witchcraft and the Winner"

==== Undated manuscripts ====
- Early fragment, "alas how damning praise can be"
- Epigraph, "But all the poem was soul of me"
- "The Battleford Trail" c. 1902–1903
- "If Only I Could Know" (published as "In Days to Come")
- "The Mouse's Message"
- "'Old Maids' Children"
- "The Stings of Civilization"
- "Tillicum Talks"
- "To C.H.W."
- "The Tossing of a Rose"

=== Untraced writings ===
- "Canada for the Canadians" (1902)
- "On List of Tides" (c. 1908)
- "Britain's First Born C."
- "The Flying Sun"
- "God's Laughter"
- "Indian Church Workers"
- "The Missing Miss Orme"
- "The Rain"
- "The Silent Speakers"

==== Titles from concert programs and reviews ====
- "At the Ball" (1902–1903)
- "Beneath the British Flag" (1906)
- "The Captive" (1892)
- "A Case of Flirtation" (1899)
- "The Chief's Daughter" (1898)
- "The Convict's Wife" (1892)
- "Fashionable Intelligence" (1906)
- "The Englishman" (1902–1903)
- "Half Mast" (1897)
- "Her Majesty's Troops" (1900); "His Majesty's Troops" (1904)
- "His Sister's Son" (1895–1897)
- "Legend of the Lover's Leap" (1892)
- "Mrs Stewart's Five O'Clock Tea" (1894–1906)
- "My Girls" (1897)
- "People I Have Met" (1902)
- "A Plea for the Northwest" (1892–1893)
- "Redwing" (1892–1893)
- "Stepping Stones" (1897)
- "The Success of the Season" (1894–1906)
- "The White Wampum" (1896–1897)

== See also ==
- Canadian literature
- Canadian poetry
- List of Canadian poets
