= Songs of the Great Dominion =

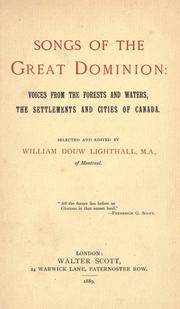
- Title page for Songs of the Great Dominion (1889)
- Author: W.D. Lighthall, ed.
- Language: English
- Series: Windsor Series
- Subject: poetry
- Publisher: Walter Scott
- Publication date: 1889
- Publication place: Canada
- LC Class: PR 9251 L5

Songs of the Great Dominion was a pioneering anthology of Canadian poetry published in 1889. The book's full title was Songs of the Great Dominion: Voices from the Forests and Waters, the Settlements and Cities of Canada. The collection was selected and edited by William Douw Lighthall of Montreal. It was published in London, England by the firm of Walter Scott, as part of its "Windsor Series" of anthologies.

The book introduced Canadian and English audiences to a new generation of Canadian writers. It marked the first publication in book form for several poets, including Bliss Carman, Pauline Johnson, and Duncan Campbell Scott.

== History ==
Lighthall was asked to put together an anthology for Walter Scott by poet William Sharp, who was working as an editor for the firm. Independently, freelance editor Ernest Rhys made the same proposal on behalf of Walter Scott to Canadian poet Charles G.D. Roberts. When the mixup was revealed, Roberts withdrew, but promised Lighthall "whatever assistance you might permit me to be." Roberts suggested several writers for inclusion, including his cousin Barry Straton and his sister Elizabeth (both of whom were included).

"Supplied with a ringing introduction which echoes with patriotic sentiment and lyrical praise for Canada," says the Canadian Encyclopedia, "this is a collection of confident poetry truly representative of the national and literary self-respect of the emergent Dominion."

In his introduction, Lighthall was lavish in his praise of Roberts. "The foremost name in Canadian song at the present day is that of Charles George Douglas Roberts," he declared. Immediately after Roberts Lighthall talked of Charles Sangster, whom he called Canada's "first important national poet" and "a kind of Wordsworth."

Lighthall was also lavish in praising the reputation of Isabella Valancy Crawford, whose one book of poetry had failed to sell in 1884, and who had died neglected in 1887 (a "sad story of unrecognized genius and death," as he put it). While gently mocking her title, Lighthall pronounced Crawford's book, Old Spookse's Pass, Malcolm's Katie, and Other Poems, to be "the most striking volume" of Canadian poetry after Roberts's, and "even more boldly new" than his. After her death, he added, "Miss Crawford's work was, in fact, seen to be phenomenal."

In a review of Songs of the Great Dominion in the September 28, 1889, Athenæum, Theodore Watts-Dunton singled out Pauline Johnson for special praise, calling her “the most interesting English poetess now living” and quoting her poem "In the Shadows" in full. Johnson (who had not yet published a book) considered this to be a big boost for her career, and felt herself "indebted" for the inclusion and the review.

One person who was unhappy with the selection was William Wilfred Campbell. "I have been cruelly misrepresented by a willful choice of my poorest work," Campbell wrote to a friend."

"The anthology is noteworthy for its attempt to include some French Canadian poetry in the appendix as well as some folksongs in translation, and for its recognition of a distinct Indian element in Canadian writing."

Walter Scott republished the anthology in 1892 under the title, Canadian Poems and Lays: Selections of native verse reflecting the seasons, legends, and life of the Dominion.

== Contents ==
Contents of the 1889 edition:

- Introduction [William Douw Lighthall] /xxi
- Entry of the Minstrels (from Masque of the Minstrels), Arthur J. Lockhart /xxxix

I. The Imperial Spirit

- Hastings (from Merlin and Other Poems), John Reade /3
- Advance of the Empire (from Jubilee Poems), Mary Barry Smith /5
- Canada to England, Anonymous /7
- Empire First, Jean-Talon L'Espérance ("Laclède") /10
- The Canadians on the Nile (from Poems), William Wye Smith /11

II. The New Nationality

- Dominion Day, "Fidelis" / 15
- Canada (from In Divers Tones), Charles G.D. Roberts /18
- The Confused Dawn (from Thoughts, Moods, and Ideals), William Douw Lighthall /21
- National Hymn (from Thoughts, Moods, and Ideals), William Douw Lighthall /22
- From "'85", Barry Straton /24
- Song for Canada, Charles Sangster /25
- Here's to the Land (from Poems), William Wye Smith /27
- Canada Not Last (from Thoughts, Moods, and Ideals), William Douw Lighthall /28
- An Ode to the Canadian Confederacy (from In Divers Tones, Charles G.D. Roberts /30
- Collect for Dominion Day (from In Divers Tones, Charles G.D. Roberts /32

III. The Indian

- A Blood-Red Ring Hung Round the Moon, John E. Logan ("Barry Dane") /35
- The Departing of Clote Scarp (from In Divers Tones), Charles G.D. Roberts /36
- Change on the Ottawa (from Marguerite), George Martin /38
- From "Tecumseh" (Act I, Scene 2), Charles Mair /42
- The Arctic Indian's Faith (from Poems), Hon. Thomas D'Arcy McGee /44
- Taapookaa: A Huron Legend (from Hesperus), Charles Sangster /45
- The Caughnawaga Beadwork Seller, William Douw Lighthall /49
- The Indian's Grave, Bishop George Jehoshaphat Mountain /51
- Wahonomin: Indian Hymn to the Queen (from Soul's Quest), Frederick George Scott /52
- Wabanaki Song, tr. Charles G. Leland /59
- Wabanaki Song, tr. Charles G. Leland /60
- Caughnawaga Song, tr. John Waniente Jocks / 62

IV. The Voyageur and Habitant

- The Old Régime (from Song of Welcome), Mrs. J.F.W. Harrison ("Seranus") / 67
- Malbrouck (Old Chanson), tr. William M'Lennan /71
- A La Claire Fontaine (Old Chanson), tr. William Douw Lighthall /74
- En Roulant Ma Boule (Old Chanson), tr. William M'Lennan /76
- Gai le Rosier (Old Chanson), tr. William M'Lennan /78
- Entre Paris et Saint-Denis (Old Chanson), tr. William M'Lennan /80
- Marianson (Old Chanson), tr. William M'Lennan /83
- The Resettlement of Acadia, Arthur Wentworth Eaton /87
- At the Cedars, Duncan Campbell Scott /91
- Rose Latulippe (A French-Canadian Legend), Mrs. J.F.W. Harrison ("Seranus") / 94
- Adieu to France (from Roberval), John Hunter-Duvar /104

V. Settlement Life

- Song of the Axe (from Spooks's Pass), Isabella Valancy Crawford /107
- Fire in the Woods; or, the Old Settler's Story, Alexander M'Lachlan /109
- Burnt Lands, Charles G.D. Roberts /114
- Acres of Your Own (from Poems and Songs), Alexander M'Lachlan /115
- From "Malcolm's Katie" (from Old Spooks's Pass), Isabella Valancy Crawford /117
- From "Malcolm's Katie" (from Old Spooks's Pass), Isabella Valancy Crawford /119
- The Second Concession of Deer (from Poems), William Wye Smith /125
- The Scot Abroad (from Spring Flowers), Sir Daniel Wilson /127
- The Farmer's Daughter Cherry (from Old Spooks's Pass), Isabella Valancy Crawford /129
- A Canadian Folk-Song, William Wilfred Campbell /133
- The Pioneers (A Ballad), William Douw Lighthall /134
- "Rough Ben" (North-west Rebellion Incident), Kate B. Simpson /136
- "The Injun" (Incident of Minnesota Massacre), John E. Logan ("Barry Dane") /142
- Shakespeer at Dead-Hos' Crick (A North-west Romance), John E. Logan ("Barry Dane") /148

VI. Sports and Free Life

- The Wraith of the Red Swan, Bliss Carman /157
- Birch and Paddle (from In Divers Tones), Charles G.D. Roberts /163
- The Nor-West Courier, John E. Logan ("Barry Dane") /166
- The Hall of Shadows (from Poems and Songs), Alexander M'Lachlan /168
- Canadian Hunter's Song, Mrs. Susanna (Strickland) Moodie /172
- Canadian Camping Song, James D. Edgar /173
- The Fisherman's Light (A Song of the Backwoods), Mrs. Susanna (Strickland) Moodie /174
- The Kingfisher, Charles Lee Barnes /175
- The Canoe (from Old Spooks's Pass), Isabella Valancy Crawford /177
- Canoe Song (from Old Spooks's Pass), Isabella Valancy Crawford /178
- The Walker of the Snow, Charles Dawson Shanly /181
- In the Shadows, E. Pauline Johnson /184
- On the Creek (from In Divers Tones), Charles G.D. Roberts /187
- The Rapid (St. Lawrence), Charles Sangster /190
- The Winter Spirit (Origin of the Ice Palace), Helen Fairbairn /192
- Snowshoeing Song, Arthur Weir /195
- Skating, John Lowry Stuart /197
- The Winter Carnival, John Reade /199
- The Spirit of the Carnival, "Fleurance" /203
- The Football Match, Anonymous /209

VII. The Spirit of Canadian History

- Jacques Cartier (from Poems), Hon. Thomas D'Arcy McGee /213
- L'Isle St. Croix, Arthur Wentworth Eaton /216
- The Captured Flag (from Fleur de Lys) Arthur Weir /219
- How Canada Was Saved, George Murray /222
- Madeleine de Verchères, John Reade /228
- The Battle of La Prairie (A Ballad), William Douw Lighthall /233
- The Battle of Grand Pré, M.J. Katzmann Lawson /236
- Spina Christi (from Canadian Idylls), William Kirby /240
- The Loyalists (from Laura Secord), Sarah Anne Curzon /253
- Brock (from Hesperus), Charles Sangster /254
- Capture of Fort Detroit, 1812, Charles Edwin Jakeway /256
- Tecumseh's Death (from Tecumseh), Major Richardson /260
- A Ballad for Brave Women,Charles Mair /262
- In the North-West, William Wilfred Campbell /267
- The Veteran, J.A. Fraser /269
- In Hospital, Annie Rothwell /270
- In Memoriam (from The Soul's Quest), Frederick George Scott /275

VIII. Places

- The Tantramar Revisited (from In Divers Tones), Charles G.D. Roberts /279
- Low Tide on Grand Pré, Bliss Carman /283
- The Indian Names of Acadia, attributed to DeMille /285
- On Leaving the Coast of Nova Scotia, George Frederick Cameron /287
- The Fairies in Prince Edward Island, John Hunter-Duvar /288
- The Vale of the Gaspereau (from Masque of Minstrels), Arthur J. Lockhart /290
- In the Afternoon (from In Divers Tones), Charles G.D. Roberts /291
- A Dream Fulfilled, Barry Straton /294
- The Isle of Demons (from Marguerite), George Martin /297
- The Secret of the Saguenay (from Fleur de Lys), Arthur Weir /303
- Saguenay, L.H. Fréchette, tr. J.D. Edgar /306
- Quebec (from St. Lawrence and Saguenay), Charles Sangster /307
- Montreal, William M'Lennan /308
- Montreal, William Douw Lighthall /309
- The St. Lawrence, K.L. Jones /310
- Night in the Thousand Isles (from St. Lawrence and Saguenay), Charles Sangster /312
- Ottawa, Duncan Campbell Scott /314
- At the Ferry, E. Pauline Johnson /315
- Niagara, William Kirby /317
- Lake Couchiching, W.A. Sherwood /320
- The Heart of the Lakes (from Lake Lyrics), William Wilfred Campbell /321
- Vapour and Blue (from Lake Lyrics), William Wilfred Campbell /322
- Medwayosh (from Lake Lyrics), William Wilfred Campbell /323
- Manitou (from Lake Lyrics), William Wilfred Campbell /324
- To the Lakes (from Lake Lyrics), William Wilfred Campbell /326
- The Legend of Restless River (from Lake Lyrics), William Wilfred Campbell /327
- Morning on the Beach (from Lake Lyrics), William Wilfred Campbell /330
- Dawn in the Island Camp (from Lake Lyrics), William Wilfred Campbell /331
- Lake Huron (from Lake Lyrics), William Wilfred Campbell /332
- Indian Summer (from Lake Lyrics), William Wilfred Campbell /333
- Sault Ste. Marie (from Poems of the Heart and Home), Pamelia Vining Yule /334
- Le Lac des Morts (from Songs of the Wilderness), Bishop George J. Mountain /337
- The Buffalo Plains (from Tecumseh, Act IV, Scene 7), Charles Mair /339
- The Last Bison, Charles Mair /342
- A Prairie Year (from Eos: A Prairie Dream), Nicholas Flood Davin /349
- The Laurentides (from Western Life), H.R.A. Pocock /352
- The Legend of Thunder (from Western Life), H.R.A. Pocock /357

IX. Seasons

- Heat (from In the Millet), Archibald Lampman /369
- To a Humming-bird in a Garden, George Murray /371
- In the Golden Birch, Elizabeth Gostwycke Roberts /374
- The Fir Woods, Charles G.D. Roberts /376
- Clouds (from In the Millet), Archibald Lampman /377
- Frogs, Charles G.D. Roberts /378
- Twilight (from Jephthah's Daughter), Charles Heavysege /379
- The Whip-Poor-Will, "Fidelis" /380
- A Canadian Summer Evening (from Poems), Mrs. Leprohon /382
- Evening on the Marshes, Barry Straton /383
- The Fire-Flies (from Dreamland), Charles Mair /385
- Midsummer Night (from In the Millet), Archibald Lampman /387
- The Autumn Tree (from Jephthah's Daughter), Charles Heavysege /388
- In Apple Time, Bliss Carman /389
- The Aurora Borealis, John E. Logan ("Barry Dane") /390
- The Maple (from Orion), Charles G.D. Roberts /391
- October (from Poems and Songs), Alexander M'Lachlan /392
- First Snow, Jean-Talon L'Espérance ("Laclède") /394
- Indian Summer, Mrs. Susanna (Strickland) Moodie /396
- Indian Summer (from Voices from the Hearth), Isidore G. Ascher /397
- An Indian Summer Carol, "Fidelis" /399
- To Winter (from Orion), Charles G.D. Roberts /401
- A Mid-Winter Night's Dream (from Snowflakes and Sunbeams), William Wilfred Campbell /404
- Winter Night (from Jephthah's Daughter), Charles Heavysege /405
- Carnations in Winter, Bliss Carman /406
- Icicle Drops, Arthur John Lockhart /407
- The Silver Frost, Barry Straton /409
- The Jewelled Trees, George Martin /411
- March (from Old Spooks's Pass), Isabella Valancy Crawford /413
- The Winds, John E. Logan ("Barry Lane") /417
- April (from In the Millet), Archibald Lampman /421
- In Lyric Season, Bliss Carman /424
- An Old Lesson from the Fields (from In the Millet), Archibald Lampman /425
- The Frogs (from In the Millet), Archibald Lampman /426
- Bobolink (from Poems and Songs), Alexander M'Lachlan /429
- The Canadian Song-Sparrow, J.D. Edgar /431
- In June, E.W. Thomson /432

Appendix

- I. The Old Chansons of the French Province /437
- II. Leading Modern French-Canadian Poets /440
- Notes Biographical and Bibliographical /449
- Note of Thanks /464
