= William Douw Lighthall =

Canadian lawyer, novelist and politician (1857–1954)

William Douw Lighthall KC FRSL FRSC
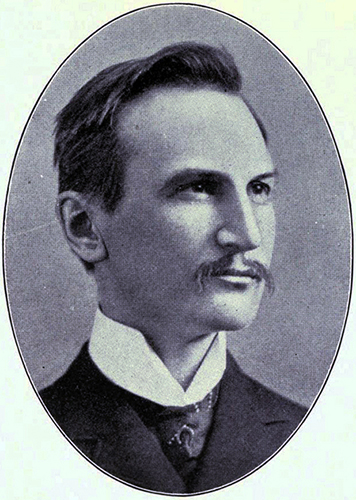
- Born: December 27, 1857; Hamilton, Canada West
- Died: August 3, 1954 (aged 96); Montreal, Quebec
- Citizenship: British subject
- Education: McGill University
- Spouse: Cybel Charlotte Wilkes
- Children: Alice Margaret Schuyler Lighthall, Cybel Katherine Schuyler Lighthall, William Wilkes Schuyler Lighthall
- Writing career
- Pen name: Wilfrid Châteauclair
- Language: English
- Genres: Poetry, novels philosophy, ontology

William Douw Lighthall KC FRSL FRSC (December 27, 1857 – August 3, 1954), often referred to as W. D. Lighthall, was a Canadian lawyer, historian, novelist, poet and philosopher.

== Life and work ==
Born in Hamilton, Canada West, to Margaret Wright [McIntyre] and William Francis Lighthall, W.D. Lighthall grew up in Montreal and attended the High School of Montreal and McGill University, where he graduated B.A. in 1879, Bachelor of Civil Laws in 1881, and M.A. in 1885. Admitted to the Quebec Bar in 1881, he practiced law in Montreal for the next 63 years, from 1881 to 1944.

In 1890 he married Cybel Charlotte Wilkes, and they had three children: Alice Margaret Schuyler Lighthall (born 1891), Cybel Katherine Schuyler Lighthall, (born 1893), and William Wilkes Schuyler Lighthall, born 1896.

In 1893, Lighthall did the legal work pro bono to incorporate the Montreal Women's Club. He served as mayor of Westmount from 1900 to 1903. Lighthall was responsible for organising civic campaigns to protest the incorporation of the Montreal Light, Heat and Power Company in 1901. His opposition to the monopolization of Montreal's utilities led him to contact the Mayor of Toronto, Oliver Howland, on June 10, 1901, about the possibility of forming an organization of municipal governments in Canada. He eventually co-founded, the Union of Canadian Municipalities (now the Federation of Canadian Municipalities) in 1901. He also served as vice president of the National Municipal League of America. In 1915, he founded Canada's first veterans' group, the Canadian Association of Returned Soldiers.

Lighthall was a member of the International Congress of Philosophy. He published in the Philosophical Review three times in the late 1920s. He took a long-time interest in Canadian history, originating the Château Ramezay Historical Museum, and serving on the Royal Historical Monuments Commission and as chairman of the McCord Historical Museum. He wrote historical books, such as Montreal After 250 Years, and monographs, like The Manor House of Lacolle.

Lighthall also wrote historical romances, initially under the pen name of Wilfrid Châteauclair, beginning with The Young Seigneur, or Nation Making in 1888. He wrote poetry as well, publishing his first book, Thoughts, Moods and Ideals, in 1887. He was an early supporter of the Canadian Authors Association, becoming its president in 1930. In literary circles, though, Lighthall "is remembered mainly for his anthology, Songs of the Great Dominion ... which included a large number of poets whose names are still familiar, for example, Wilfred Campbell, Carman, Crawford, Johnson, Lampman, and Charles G.D. Roberts."

== Recognition ==
W. D. Lighthall was elected a Fellow of the Royal Society of Canada in 1902, and served as its president in 1918 and 1919. In 1921, he was made an honorary Doctor of Laws by McGill.

== Lighthall's philosophy ==
Lighthall was among a number of the post-Darwinian thinkers of the nineteenth century who struggled with the concept of a Supreme Cause. Some of them not only struggled to redefine "God"; they also struggled to rename this entity. For his part Lighthall defined the cause as a "force of will" and called that force "The Outer Consciousness", "The Outer Knowledge", "The Directive Power", and "The Person of Evolution". However unlike the philosopher Schopenhauer or the novelist Hardy, Lighthall, who considered himself to be both a philosopher and a novelist was optimistic in his view of the nature of "the will". That optimism was based on Lighthall's unbending faith in the positive nature of evolutionary progress. His views are present in his novels particularly in The Master of Life as well as in his hope for Canada as a nation.

A reader of Lighthall's philosophical works may encounter some difficulty with the style. The main problem lies in the fact that Lighthall seldom completely reworked the lecture notes, pamphlets, and texts that he used to create the works as he published them. Furthermore, he preferred to number his paragraphs, as he considered these paragraphs to be "capsular" ideas. Perhaps due to his training in law he preferred to protect the integrity of these modules rather than sacrifice any of their meaning for the integrated flow of ideas in a particular chapter as a whole. Because of this practice the author's style appears jarringly disjointed at times. Ironically, the logical progression of deductive reasoning, so important to Lighthall's system, is often under stress because of this style.

The Lighthall system was an attempt to remarry science and religion in a single philosophical understanding of reality. Within the structure of that system Lighthall claimed to have avoided what he called the "metaphysical" problem. He insisted that all that was proposed in the hypothesis was derived from his observation of scientific fact. To be precise Lighthall considered the principles of his theory to be "proven" scientific facts and the proof to be founded upon deductive reasoning.

The system equated Instinct with Will. Further it viewed Will as the manifest cause of both the conscious and unconscious act. Lighthall stated: 'All living action is willing, and all is by nature purposive.'

Lighthall informed his readers that it was the phenomenon of the altruistic act that had been the initial "middle" ground that had led him to the formulation of the theory:

'The utilitarian school, with its intellectual solutions on the basis of joy and pains, reflected by sympathy, appeared to me to give a reasonable account of most other moral acts,-but that an individual could deliberately annihilate himself for another evidently imported some element extraneous to the individual's own ordinary machinery of willing. Determined to accept no superficial 'explanation' of the problem such as glib use of words like 'volition' and 'conation,' I reduced acts of will to their simplest forms, noting their gradual shadings into, and intimate connections with habits, instincts, functions, reflexes, etc., and observing that these led to a world outside the consciousness of the individual. Thence I was brought to conclude, like Schopenhauer, that there is a unitary directive cause behind all these processes, and I included Evolution itself, regarded as one long act of willing. The characteristics that struck me most forcibly were the independence of this outer will, and its apparently highly conscious nature.'

== Publications ==
=== History ===
- Montreal After 250 Years. Montreal: F.E. Grafton, 1892. Reprinted as Sights and Shrines of Montreal.
- A New Hochelagan Burying-Ground Discovered at Westmount on the Western Spur of Mount Royal, Montreal, July–September 1898. Montreal: Privately printed, 1898.
- The Manor House of Lacolle. C.A. Marchand, n.d.
- The Glorious Enterprise (1902)
- Canada, A Modern Nation (1904)

=== Philosophy ===
- Sketch of a new utilitarianism: including a criticism of the ordinary argument from design and other matter (1877).
- "An Organic Superpersonality?--A Rejoinder." Philosophical Review 36 (4):372-373. (1927).
- "The Directive Power." Philosophical Review 37 (6):600-606. (1928).
- "The Knowledge That is in Instinct." Philosophical Review 39 (5):491-501 (1930).
- The Person of Evolution: The Outer Consciousness, The Outer Knowledge, The Directive Power, Studies of Instinct as Contribution to a Philosophy of Evolution. Toronto: Macmillan, 1930.

=== Fiction ===
- The Young Seigneur, or Nation Making. Montreal: Drysdale, 1888.
- The False Chevalier, or, The Lifeguard of Marie Antionette. Montreal: F.E. Grafton, 1898.
- The Master of Life: A Romance of the Five Nations and of Prehistoric Montreal. Toronto: Musson, 1908.

=== Poetry ===
- Thoughts, Moods and Ideals: Crimes of Leisure. Montreal: "Witness" Steam Printing House, 1887.
- Old Measures (collected verse). Montreal: A.T. Chapman, 1922. Toronto: Musson, 1922.

=== Edited ===
- Songs of the Great Dominion: Voices from the Forests and Waters, the Settlements and Cities of Canada Walter Scott [Windsor Series], 1889.
- Canadian Poems and Lays. Walter Scott, 1892.
- Canadian Poems (Canterbury Poets, 1891).

Professional and academic associations
Preceded by Archibald Macallum	President of the Royal Society of Canada; 1917–1918	Succeeded by Rodolphe Lemieux
