= Norma Guillard =

Cuban social psychologist

Norma Guillard Limonta is a Cuban social psychologist and adjunct lecturer at the University of Havana. She is a co-founder of Grupo Oremi, a now defunct lesbian discussion group in Cuba. Her academic works borders on gender, sexuality, race and identity. Guillard is a foundation member of the Cuban branch of La Articulacion Regional de Afrodescendientes de Latinoamerica y el Caribe, a joint regional discussion group composed of individuals of African descent in Latin America and the Caribbean.

She appeared as one of the protagonists in Catherine Murphy's documentary, Maestra about the Cuban Literacy Campaign.

== Life ==
Guillard's spent her childhood in Santiago de Cuba. She participated in the Cuban Literacy Campaign when she was 16.

In 1993, Guillard joined Magin, an association of professional women media communicators and worked with the organization as a public relations specialist before it was closed down. The organization worked to create awareness about gender equality and gender bias in the media and to challenge negative images of women in the media. Her work for Magin led her to write articles about sexuality and feminism. She was later approached by Mariela Castro of National Centre for Sex Education to organize a group of Cuban lesbians which was called OREMI. Oremi, the Cuban Multidisciplinary Society for the Study of Sexuality and the National Centre for Sex Education organized a symbolic same-sex marriage in 2007, the first-ever in the country to be recognized by the government.

In 2016, Guillard did an interview with BBC World Service in which she described her life as a single, lesbian mother during the Cuban Revolution.
