= Divisions on a Ground =

Book by Northrop Frye

Divisions on a Ground: Essays on Canadian Culture
- Editor: James Polk
- Author: Northrop Frye
- Language: English
- Publisher: Anansi Press
- Publication date: 1982

Divisions on a Ground: Essays on Canadian Culture is a collection of essays by Canadian literary critic Northrop Frye, edited by James Polk and published in 1982. The collection includes lectures, addresses and previously published articles by Frye. Divisions on a Ground presents Frye's theorizing about Canada with respect to three main themes: Canadian literary writing, university education in Canada and internationally, and a more general "social order" perspective. This collection diverges from Frye's better-known The Bush Garden: Essays on the Canadian Imagination in its approach to Canada in that it does not present the "Canadian imagination" in isolation, but rather as one of several components of Canadian society identity.

== Contents ==
I Writing

- Culture as Interpenetration

(address read to UNESCO's International Council of Philosophy and Humanistic Studies, Montreal, Quebec, Canada, September 16, 1977)

- Across the River and Out of the Trees

(from University of Toronto Quarterly, vol. 50, no. 1 (Fall 1980) and The Arts in Canada: The Last Fifty Years edited by W. J. Keith and B.-Z. Shek, pp. 1-4. University of Toronto Press 1980)

- National Consciousness in Canadian Culture

(address read to the Royal Society of Canada, June 7, 1976)

- Sharing the Continent

(from "Canadian Culture Today," an address read to the "Twentieth Century Canadian Culture Symposium", Washington, D. C. February 2, 1977)

- "Conclusion" to Literary History of Canada Second Edition

(Literary History of Canada: Canadian Literature in English Second Edition, ed. Carl Klinck, University of Toronto Press, 1976)

II Teaching

- Teaching the Humanities Today

(from "The Presidential Address", delivered at the 91st annual convention of the Modern Language Association in New York City, December 27, 1976)

- Humanities in a New World

(address delivered for the installation of Claude Bissell as President of the University of Toronto, November 22, 1958)

- The Writer and the University

(from "Culture and the National Will", Convocation Address, Carleton University, May 17, 1957)

- The Teacher's Source of Authority

(address read at the American Educational Research Association Conference, March 30, 1978)

III The Social Order

- The Definition of a University

(a lecture at the Ontario Institute for Studies in Education, November 4, 1970)

- The Ethics of Change

(address given at Queen's University, Kingston, Ontario, November 8, 1968)

- Canada: New World Without Revolution

(address given at the Royal Society Symposium, October 7, 1975)

- The Rear-View Mirror: Notes Toward A Future

(from an address read on the occasion of the Royal Bank Award, Toronto, Ontario, September 18, 1978)
