= Favete linguis! =

Latin phrase encouraging silence

"Favete linguis!" is a Latin phrase, which means "facilitate [the ritual acts] with your tongues” ("tongues" as the organ of speech). In other words, "hold your tongue" or "facilitate the ritual acts by being silent".

The phrase is used by Cicero, Ovid, Horace, Pliny the Elder and Seneca.

Northrop Frye used the term in reference to the way that the philosophy of "new criticism" proscribes a limitation on the use of interdisciplinary criticism, suggesting that, for those who wish to dabble with a text by using tools from outside the literary tradition (i.e. using the critical techniques of other artistic disciplines on literature), they would do well to 'hold their tongues.'

== Origin ==
'Favour me with your tongues'. During official ritual acts a herald ordered the others to be silent by saying this phrase. It was done in order to avert an interruption by a careless, maybe also an ominous, word.

== Examples ==
- Marcus Tullius Cicero (106 BC–43 BC), De divinatione (2, 83)
- Horace (65 BC – 8 BC), Carmina (3, 1, 2)
- Ovid (43 BC – AD 17/18), Fasti (2, 654)
- Seneca (4 BC – AD 65), De vita beata (26, 7)
- Pliny the Elder (AD 23 – AD 79), Naturalis historia (28, 3)
- Northrop Frye (1919-91), Anatomy of Criticism: Four Essays (82)
