= Post-tech =

Human-centric/ethical type of technology

Post-tech, (or post-technology, post-digital-technology) is a type of technology that is more concerned about being human than about technology. It advocates a design that is not merely focused on efficiency and exploiting users by increasing their time spent with digital devices and technology itself but to support the user's focus and intent, well-being, and independence (from technology). With this interstitial spaces could also be created, similar to what Michel Foucault describes as heterotopia.

== See also ==
- Human-centered computing (discipline)
- Human-computer interaction
- Attention economy
