= Green World (disambiguation) =

Green World is a literary concept defined by critic Northrop Frye in The Anatomy of Criticism.

Green World may also refer to:

- The Green World, an album by Dar Williams
- Green World Ecological Farm, an ecological farm in Hsinchu, Taiwan
- Green World ATP Challenger, a tennis tournament held in Pingguo, China

== See also ==
- Another Green World an album by Brian Eno
- Green World Tourist, an album by Suicide Machines
- "O Green World", a song by Gorillaz
- Greenworld, a 2010 book by Dougal Dixon
- Greenworld, a planet appearing in the Spawn comics
