= Guillard =

Guillard is a surname, and may refer to:

- Charlotte Guillard, first woman printer of importance
- Georges Guillard (born 1939), French former holder of the Great Organ of the Notre-Dame church in Paris
- Marie Guillard (born 1972), French actress
- Melvin Guillard, American mixed martial artist
- Nicolas-François Guillard, French writer of operatic librettos
- Norma Guillard Limonta, Cuban social psychologist and researcher on gender, sexuality, race and identity
- Robert Guillard, French bobsledder

== See also ==
- Huillard
