= Statue of Northrop Frye =

Sculpture in Toronto, Ontario, Canada

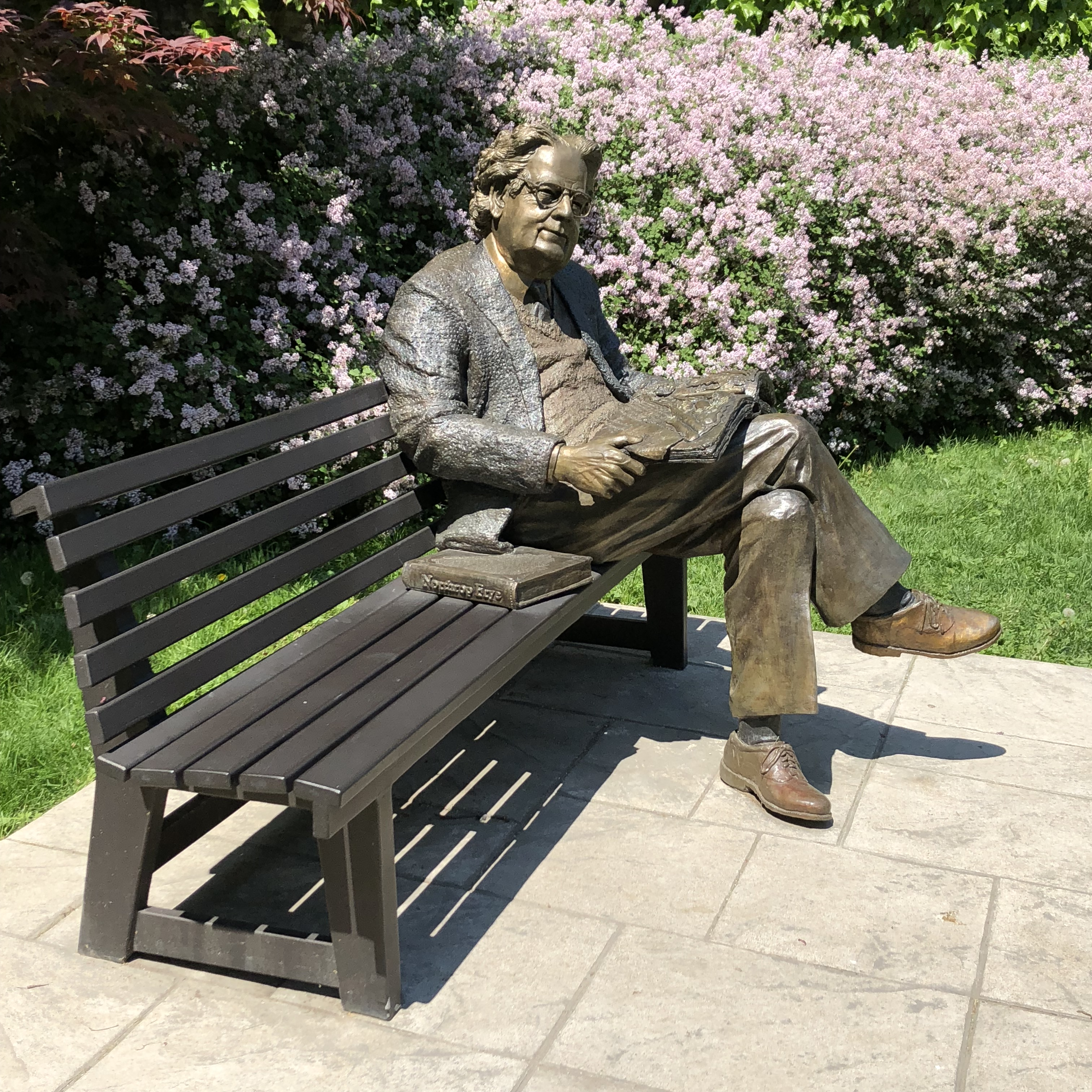
- The statue in 2018
- Artist: Darren Byers; Fred Harrison
- Year: 2012
- Subject: Northrop Frye
- Location: Victoria University, Toronto, Ontario, Canada; 43°39′59.7″N 79°23′32.4″W

A statue of Northrop Frye (1912–1991) is installed at Victoria University in Toronto, Ontario, Canada. It was unveiled in October 2012 as part of the centennial anniversary of Northrop Frye's birth, celebrated at the university.

Frye, an influential literary theorist and long-time member of Victoria University, graduated from Victoria College in 1933 and Emmanuel College in 1936 before returning to become a professor of English, where he spent the remainder of his professional career.

Created by Darren Byers and Fred Harrison, the bronze statue is a modified version of a sculpture in Frye's hometown of Moncton, New Brunswick. The statue is located west of Northrop Frye Hall, with its gaze facing eastward towards the E.J. Pratt Library, founded during Frye's tenure as principal of Victoria College. Among the stack of books that the statue holds is a class planner – meant to reflect Frye's time at Victoria University. In its right hand is sketch of a party created by Frye's wife, Helen Kemp. The book it holds contains images of an angel, the Leviathan and the divine creator, which allude to his religious background and to poet William Blake, whose work is the focus of Fearful Symmetry.
