= The Well-Tempered Critic =

The Well-Tempered Critic may refer to:

- The Well-Tempered Critic (Davies book), a 1981 collection of essays by Robertson Davies
- The Well-Tempered Critic (Frye book), a 1963 collection of essays by Northrop Frye
