= Survival: A Thematic Guide to Canadian Literature =

Literature review by Margaret Atwood

- First edition
- Author: Margaret Atwood
- Language: English
- Publisher: House of Anansi
- Publication date: 1972
- Publication place: Canada

Survival: A Thematic Guide to Canadian Literature is a survey of Canadian literature by Margaret Atwood, one of the best-known Canadian authors. It was first published by House of Anansi in 1972.

A work of literary criticism, as Atwood writes in her preface to the 2004 edition, Survival was an attempt to deal with her belief that in the early 1970s, Canadian literature was still looking for a grounding in a national identity that would be comparable to that of Great Britain or the United States. The thematic approach of the book and its intended non-academic audience corresponds with a focus on contemporary Canadian literature as a point of entry. Therefore, the book does not provide an extensive survey of the historical development of Canada's literature, but an introduction to what is Canadian about Canadian literature for readers as citizens of Canada. (Note: Compare pg. 22 in Survival.) In Survival, literature emerges as central to the development of national identity, what she calls a sense of "here".

In 1996, the work was republished. In 2004, the work was reprinted again alongside an introduction by the author. In 2012, a third reprinting occurred in a large type edition.

== Central image ==
To Atwood, the central image of Canadian literature, equivalent to the image of the island in British literature and the frontier in American literature, is the notion of survival and its central character the victim. Atwood claims that both English and French novels, short stories, plays and poems participate in creating this theme as the central distinguishing feature of the nation's literature.

The central image of the victim is not static; according to Atwood four "Victim Positions" are possible (and visible in Canadian literature). These positions are outlined below.

- Position One: To deny the fact that you are a victim.

This is a position in which members of the "victim-group" will deny their identity as victims, accusing those members of the group who are less fortunate of being responsible for their own victimhood.

- Position Two: To acknowledge the fact that you are a victim (but attribute it to a powerful force beyond human control such as fate, history, God, or biology.)

In this position, victims are likely to resign themselves to their fate.

- Position Three: To acknowledge the fact that you are a victim but to refuse to accept the assumption that the role is inevitable.

This is a dynamic position in which the victim differentiates between the role of victim and the experience of victim.

- Position Four: To be a creative non-victim.

A position for "ex-victims" when creativity of all kinds is fully possible.

== Criticism of Survival ==
From the time it first appeared in 1972, Survival was generally well-received by the popular press, but severely criticized by many Canadian literature scholars and academics as being simplistic, narrow in scope, unhistorical, biased, not supported by literary evidence, based on poorly-grounded assertions and distorting readers' views on Canadian writing. The first negative reviews of Survival were by Frank Davey, a poet, critic, and editor. (Note: Frank Davey's pertinent works being the articles "Atwood Walking Backwards." Open Letter 2:5 (1973) and "Surviving the Paraphrase." Canadian Literature 70 (1976) alongside his book Surviving the Paraphrase (1983).) Other major critics of the work include Joseph Pivato, (Note: Joseph Pivato. "Eight Approaches to Canadian Literary Criticism." Journal of Commonwealth Literature 13:3 (1979) and his book Contrasts Comparative Essays on Italian-Canadian Writing (1985 & 1991).) Robin Mathews, (Note: Robin Mathews. "Survival and Struggle in Canadian Literature." This Magazine Is About Schools 6:4 (1972-73)) George Woodcock, (Note: George Woodcock. "Horizon of Survival." Canadian Literature 55 (1973)) Paul Stuewe, (Note: Paul Stuewe. Clearing the Ground: English-Canadian Literature After Survival (1984)) Barry Cameron, and Michael Dixon. (Note: Barry Cameron and Michael Dixon. "Mandatory Subservience Manifesto: Canadian Criticism vs Literary Criticism." Studies in Canadian Literature 2 (1977)) The criticisms of these authors suggest that Atwood's Survival provided too simplistic a representation of Canadian literature.

While Atwood claims survivalism distinguishes Canadian literature from that of Great Britain and the United States, the claim is not original. She had taken inspiration from Northrop Frye's image of the "garrison mentality", found within The Bush Garden (1971), and expanded on D. G. Jones' book of critical essays Butterfly on Rock (1970). The claim itself may indeed not be particularly Canadian. American historian Frederick Jackson Turner argued for such a position in reference to the American psyche. (Note: See also Michael S. Cross, The Frontier Thesis and the Canadas: The Debate on the Impact of the Canadian Environment. Toronto, 1970.)

== Sources ==
- Atwood, Margaret. Survival: A Thematic Guide to Canadian Literature. Toronto: McClelland and Stewart, 2004. ISBN 0-7710-0872-4
