= Heterotopia (space) =

"Other" spaces with specific functions

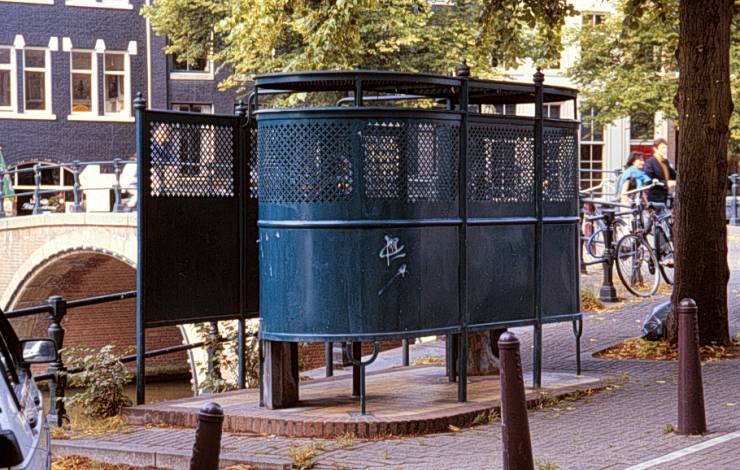
A public toilet in Amsterdam, an example of a heterotopia of ritual or purification

Heterotopia (from Greek ἕτερος, héteros 'different, other, distinct' and Greek τόπος, tópos 'place') is a concept elaborated by the philosopher Michel Foucault to describe certain cultural, institutional and discursive spaces that are somehow "other": disturbing, intense, incompatible, contradictory or transforming. Heterotopias are "worlds within worlds": both similar to their surroundings, and contrasting with or upsetting them. Foucault provides examples: ships, cemeteries, bars, brothels, prisons, gardens of antiquity, fairs, Muslim baths and many more. Foucault outlines the notion of heterotopia on three occasions between 1966 and 1967. A lecture given by Foucault to a group of architects in 1967 is the most well-known explanation of the term. His first mention of the concept is in his preface to The Order of Things, and refers to texts rather than socio-cultural spaces.

== Etymology ==
Heterotopia follows the template established by the notions of utopia and dystopia. The prefix hetero- is from Ancient Greek ἕτερος (héteros, 'other, another, different') and is combined with the Greek morpheme τόπος (topos) and means 'place'. A utopia is an idea or an image that is not real but represents a perfected version of society, such as Thomas More's book or Le Corbusier's drawings. As Walter Russell Mead has written, "Utopia is a place where everything is good; dystopia is a place where everything is bad; heterotopia is where things are different—that is, a collection whose members have few or no intelligible connections with one another."

== In Foucault ==
Foucault uses the term heterotopia (French: hétérotopie) to describe spaces that have more layers of meaning or relationships to other places than immediately meet the eye. In general, a heterotopia is a physical representation or approximation of a utopia, or a parallel space (such as a prison) that contains undesirable bodies to make a real utopian space possible.

Foucault explains the link between utopias and heterotopias using the example of a mirror. A mirror is a utopia because the image reflected is a "placeless place", an unreal virtual place that allows one to see one's own visibility. However, the mirror is also a heterotopia, in that it is a real object. The heterotopia of the mirror is at once absolutely real, relating with the real space surrounding it, and absolutely unreal, creating a virtual image.

Foucault articulates several possible types of heterotopia or spaces that exhibit dual meanings:

- A crisis heterotopia is a separate space like a boarding school or a motel room where activities like coming of age or a honeymoon take place out of sight. Foucault describes the crisis heterotopia as "reserved for individuals who are, in relation to society and to the human environment in which they live, in a state of crisis". He also points that crisis heterotopias are constantly disappearing from society and being replaced by the following heterotopia of deviation.
- Heterotopias of deviation are institutions where we place individuals whose behavior is outside the norm (hospitals, asylums, prisons, rest homes).
- A heterotopia can be a single real place that juxtaposes several spaces. A garden can be a heterotopia, if it is a real space meant to be a microcosm of various environments, with plants from around the world. Similarly, theaters and cinemas are heterotopias where multiple incompatible spaces converge on a single stage or screen, bringing together different places, times, and realities in one location.
- Heterotopias of time or heterochronies, such as museums and libraries, enclose objects from all eras and styles within a single place. They exist in time, but also exist outside of time, because they are built and preserved in such a way to be physically impervious to the ravages of time. Some heterotopias, on the other hand, are more transient and fleeting, such as festivals and amusement parks, which exist only for a limited period and offer a temporary experience outside of daily routine.
- Heterotopias of ritual or purification are spaces that are isolated and penetrable, yet not as freely accessible as a public place. Either entry to the heterotopia is compulsory, as with imprisonment, or entry requires special rituals or gestures, like in a sauna or a hammam.
- Heterotopia has a function in relation to all of the remaining spaces. The two functions are: the heterotopia of illusion, which creates a space of illusion that exposes every real space; and the heterotopia of compensation, which creates a real space—a space that is other.
- In general, therefore, a heterotopia is a place unlike another place, and since places are not all alike, every place is a potential heterotopia relative to another place. A kitchen and a bathroom stand in heterotopic relation to each other when considering a house, but when considering a house and an office, they don't, since they are subsumed under domesticity.

Foucault's elaborations on heterotopias were published in an article entitled Des espaces autres (Of Other Spaces). In the article, Foucault calls for a society with many heterotopias, not only as a space with several places of or for the affirmation of difference, but also as a means of escape from authoritarianism and repression, stating metaphorically that if people take the ship as the utmost heterotopia, then a society without ships is inherently a repressive one.

== In the work of other authors ==
Human geographers often connected to the postmodernist school have been using the term – and the author's propositions – to help understand the contemporary emergence of (cultural, social, political, economic) difference and identity as a central issue in larger multicultural cities. The idea of place (more often related to ethnicity and gender and less often to the social class issue) as a heterotopic entity has been gaining attention in the current context of postmodern, post-structuralist theoretical discussion (and political practice) in geography and other spatial social sciences. The concept of a heterotopia has also been discussed in relation to spaces in which learning takes place, such as institutes of tertiary education. There is an extensive debate with theorists, such as David Harvey, who remain focused on the matter of class domination as the central determinant of social heteronomy.

The late geographer Edward Soja worked with this concept in dialogue with the works of Henri Lefebvre concerning urban space in the book Thirdspace.

Mary Franklin-Brown uses the concept of heterotopia in an epistemological context to examine the thirteenth century encyclopedias of Vincent of Beauvais and Ramon Llull as conceptual spaces where many possible ways of knowing are brought together without attempting to reconcile them.

New media scholar Hye Jean Chung applies the concept of heterotopia to describe the multiple superimposed layers of spatiality and temporality observed in highly digitized audiovisual media. According to Chung, a heterotopic perception of digital media is to grasp the globally dispersed labor structure of multinational capitalism that produces the audiovisual representations of various spacio-temporalities.

== In literature ==
The concept of heterotopia has had a significant impact on literature, especially science fiction, fantasy, and other speculative genres. Many readers consider the worlds of China Miéville and other weird fiction writers to be heterotopias insofar as they are worlds of radical difference which are transparent to, or of indifference to, their inhabitants. Samuel Delany's 1976 novel Trouble on Triton is subtitled An Ambiguous Heterotopia and was written partly in dialogue with Ursula K. Le Guin's science fiction novel The Dispossessed, which is subtitled An Ambiguous Utopia.

== See also ==
- Green World – Literary concept defined by Northrop Frye in 1957
- Liminality#In places – Quality of ambiguity, disorientation, or state of transition
- Liminal space (aesthetic) – Internet aesthetic depicting empty or transitional places
- Non-place – Concept in anthropology
- Panopticon – Prison design
- Total institution – Place where a lot of people (in the same condition) live together, cut off from society
