= Collected Works of Northrop Frye =

Scholarly edition of the writings of literary critic Northrop Frye

The Collected Works of Northrop Frye is a uniform scholarly edition of the writings of the 20th-century literary critic Northrop Frye. The series was published by the University of Toronto Press under the general editorship of Alvin A. Lee, with the first of its thirty volumes appearing in 1996 and the last appearing in 2012. Alongside Frye's established critical writings, interviews, and speeches, the Collected Works presents previously unpublished material, such as diaries, book drafts, and juvenilia, drawn from his archives at Victoria University, Toronto. The project was funded by various grants from the Michael G. DeGroote family through McMaster University, from the Social Sciences and Humanities Research Council of Canada, and from Victoria University, Toronto.

== Volumes ==
The following volumes have been published by the University of Toronto Press:

- The Correspondence of Northrop Frye and Helen Kemp, 1932–1939. Ed. Robert D. Denham. Collected Works (CW), 1–2, 1996.
- Northrop Frye's Student Essays, 1932–1938. Ed. Robert D. Denham. CW, 3, 1997.
- Northrop Frye on Religion: Excluding "The Great Code" and "Words with Power." Ed. Alvin A. Lee and Jean O'Grady. CW, 4, 1999.
- Northrop Frye's Late Notebooks, 1982–1990: Architecture of the Spiritual World. Ed. Robert D. Denham. CW, 5–6, 2002.
- Northrop Frye's Writings on Education. Ed. Jean O'Grady and Goldwin French. CW, 7, 2001.
- The Diaries of Northrop Frye, 1942–1955. Ed. Robert D. Denham. CW, 8, 2001.
- The "Third Book" Notebooks of Northrop Frye, 1964–1972. Ed. Michael Dolzani. CW, 9, 2002.
- Northrop Frye on Literature and Society, 1936–1989. Ed. Robert D. Denham. CW, 10, 2002.
- Northrop Frye on Modern Culture. Ed. Jan Gorak. CW, 11, 2003.
- Northrop Frye on Canada. Ed. Jean O'Grady and David Staines. CW, 12, 2003.
- Northrop Frye's Notebooks and Lectures on the Bible and Other Religious Texts. Ed. Robert D. Denham. CW, 13, 2003.
- Fearful Symmetry: A Study of William Blake. Ed. Nicholas Halmi. CW, 14, 2004.
- Northrop Frye's Notebooks on Romance. Ed. Michael Dolzani. CW, 15, 2004.
- Northrop Frye on Milton and Blake. Ed. Angela Esterhammer. CW, 16, 2005.
- Northrop Frye's Writings on the Eighteenth and Nineteenth Centuries. Ed. Imre Salusinskzy. CW, 17, 2005.
- "The Secular Scripture" and Other Writings on Critical Theory, 1976–1991. Ed. Joseph Adamson and Jean Wilson. CW, 18, 2006.
- The Great Code: The Bible and Literature. Ed. Alvin A. Lee. CW, 19, 2006.
- Northrop Frye's Notebooks on Renaissance Literature. Ed. Michael Dolzani. CW, 20, 2006.
- "The Educated Imagination" and Other Writings on Critical Theory, 1933–1963. Ed. Germaine Warkentin. CW, 21, 2006.
- Anatomy of Criticism. Ed. Robert D. Denham. CW, 22, 2007.
- Northrop Frye's Notebooks for "Anatomy of Criticism." Ed. Robert D. Denham. CW, 23, 2007.
- Interviews with Northrop Frye. Ed. Jean O'Grady. CW, 24, 2008.
- Northrop Frye's Fiction and Miscellaneous Writings. Ed. Robert D. Denham and Michael Dolzani. CW, 25, 2007.
- Words with Power: Being a Second Study of The Bible and Literature. Ed. Michael Dolzani. CW, 26, 2008.
- The Critical Path and Other Writings on Critical Theory, 1963–1975. Ed. Eva Kushner and Jean O'Grady. CW, 27, 2009.
- Northrop Frye's Writings on Shakespeare and the Renaissance. Ed. Troni Grande and Garry Sherbert. CW, 28, 2010.
- Northrop Frye on Twentieth-Century Literature. Ed. Glen Robert Gill. CW, 29, 2010.
- Index to the Collected Works of Northrop Frye. Jean O'Grady. CW, 30, 2012.
