= House of Anansi Press =

Canadian publishing company

- Founded: 1967
- Founder: Dennis Lee and Dave Godfrey
- Country of origin: Canada
- Headquarters location: Toronto
- Distribution: Jaguar Book Group in Canada, Publishers Group West in the United States
- Key people: Karen Brochu (Publisher)
- Imprints: The Massey Lectures, Spiderline, Anansi Poetry, A List, Arachnide, Astoria, Anansi International, Groundwood Books
- Official website: www.houseofanansi.com

House of Anansi Press is a Canadian publishing company, founded in 1967 by writers Dennis Lee and Dave Godfrey. The company specializes in finding and developing new Canadian writers of literary fiction, poetry, and non-fiction.

== History ==
Anansi started as a small press with only one full-time employee, writer George Fetherling. It quickly gained attention for publishing significant authors such as Margaret Atwood, Matt Cohen, Michael Ondaatje, Marian Engel, Erín Moure, Paulette Jiles, George Grant and Northrop Frye. The company also published many translations of French language works by authors such as Roch Carrier, Anne Hébert, Lise Bissonnette and Marie-Claire Blais.

Anansi publishes the transcripts for many of the Massey Lectures.

House of Anansi Press was purchased in 1989 by General Publishing, parent of Stoddart Publishing. In June 2002 it was acquired by Scott Griffin, founder of the Griffin Poetry Prize.

== Select bibliography ==
- Survival: A Thematic Guide to Canadian Literature, Margaret Atwood (1972)
