= Anatomy of Criticism =

Literary criticism book by Northrop Frye

- Cloth front cover of the first edition
- Author: Northrop Frye
- Language: English
- Subject: Literary criticism; rhetoric
- Publisher: Princeton University Press
- Publication date: 1957
- Publication place: Canada
- Media type: Print
- Pages: 383
- OCLC: 230039

Anatomy of Criticism: Four Essays (Princeton University Press, 1957) is a book by Canadian literary critic and theorist Northrop Frye that attempts to formulate an overall view of the scope, theory, principles, and techniques of literary criticism derived exclusively from literature. Frye consciously omits all specific and practical criticism, instead offering classically inspired theories of modes, symbols, myths and genres, in what he termed "an interconnected group of suggestions." The literary approach proposed by Frye in Anatomy was highly influential in the decades before deconstructivist criticism and other expressions of postmodernism came to prominence in American academia in the 1980s.

Frye's four essays are sandwiched between a "Polemical Introduction" and a "Tentative Conclusion." The four essays are titled "Historical Criticism: Theory of Modes", "Ethical Criticism: Theory of Symbols", "Archetypal Criticism: A Theory of Myths", and "Rhetorical Criticism: Theory of Genres."

== Contents ==
=== Polemical introduction ===
The purpose of the introduction is to defend the need for literary criticism, to distinguish the nature of genuine literary criticism from other forms of criticism, and to clarify the difference between direct experience of literature and the systematic study of literary criticism.

There are a number of reasons why the introduction is labeled as a "polemic". In defending the need for literary criticism, Frye opposes a notion common to Tolstoy and Romantic thought that "natural taste" is superior to scholarly learning (and by extension, criticism). Frye also accuses a number of methods of criticism (e.g. Marxist, Freudian, Jungian, Neo-classical, etc.) as being embodiments of the deterministic fallacy. He is not opposed to these ideologies in particular, but sees the application of any external, ready-made ideology to literature as a departure from genuine criticism. This results in subjecting a work of literature to an individual's pet philosophy and an elevation or demotion of authors according to their conformity to the pet philosophy.

Another point is to distinguish the difference between personal taste and genuine criticism. Personal taste is too easily swayed by the prevailing morals, values and tastes of the critic's society at that point in history. If taste succumbs entirely to such social forces, the result is the same as that of consciously adopting an external ideology described above. Yet even if there is a consensus among critics that the works of John Milton are more fruitful than Richard Blackmore (to use Frye's example), a critic contributes little by saying so. In other words, value judgments contribute little to meaningful criticism.

In place of meaningless criticism, Frye proposes a genuine literary criticism which draws its method from the body of literature itself. Literary criticism ought to be a systematic study of works of literature, just as physics is of nature and history is of human action. Frye makes the explicit assumption that in order for systematic study to be possible, the body of literature must already possess a systematic nature. Frye claims that we know very little about this system as yet and that the systematic study of literature has progressed little since Aristotle.

Frye concludes his introduction by addressing the weaknesses of his argument. He mentions that the introduction is a polemic, but written in first person to acknowledge the individual nature of his views. He concedes that the following essays can only give a preliminary, and likely inexact, glimpse of the system of literature. He admits to making sweeping generalities that will often prove false in light of particular examples. Finally, he stresses that while many feel an "emotional repugnance" to schematization of poetry, the schematization should be regarded as an aspect of criticism, not the vibrant, personal, direct experience of the work itself—much as the geologist turns away from his or her systematic work to enjoy the beauty of the mountains.

=== "Historical Criticism: Theory of Modes" ===
Frye's systemization of literature begins with three aspects of poetry given by Aristotle in his Poetics: mythos (plot), ethos (characterization/setting), and dianoia (theme/idea). Frye sees works of literature as lying somewhere on a continuum between being plot driven, as in most fiction, and idea driven, as in essays and lyrical poetry. The first essay begins by exploring the different aspects of fiction (subdivided into tragic and comic) in each mode and ends with a similar discussion of thematic literature.

Fictional and Thematic Types by Mode
	Mythic	Romantic	High Mimetic	Low Mimetic	Ironic
Tragic	dionysiac	elegiac	classic tragedy	pathos	scapegoat
Comic	apollonian	idyllic	aristophanic	Menandic	sadism
Thematic	scripture	chronicle	nationalism	individualism	discontinuity

Frye divides his study of tragic, comic, and thematic literature into five "modes", each identified with a specific literary epoch: mythic, romantic, high mimetic, low mimetic, and ironic. This categorization is a representation of ethos, or characterization, and relates to how the protagonist is portrayed in respect to the rest of humanity and the protagonist's environment. Frye suggests that Classical civilizations progressed historically through the development of these modes, and that something similar happened in Western civilization during medieval and modern times. He speculates that contemporary fiction may be undergoing a return to myth, completing a full circle through the five modes. Frye argues that when irony is pushed to extremes, it returns to the mode of myth; this concept of the recursion of historical cycles is familiar from Giambattista Vico and Oswald Spengler.

Tragedy is concerned with the hero's separation from society.

- Mythic tragedy deals with the death of gods.
- Romantic tragedy features elegies mourning the death of heroes such as Arthur or Beowulf.
- High mimetic tragedy presents the death of a noble human such as Othello or Oedipus.
- Low mimetic tragedy shows the death or sacrifice of an ordinary human being and evokes pathos, as with Thomas Hardy's Tess or Henry James's Daisy Miller.
- The ironic mode often shows the death or suffering of a protagonist who is both weak and pitiful compared to the rest of humanity and the protagonist's environment; Franz Kafka's works provide multiple examples of such. At other times, the protagonist is not necessarily weaker than the average person yet suffers severe persecution at the hands of a deranged society. Nathaniel Hawthorne's Hester Prynne and Hardy's Tess exemplify this treatment.

Comedy is concerned with integration of society.

- Mythic comedy deals with acceptance into the society of gods, often through a number of trials as with Hercules or through salvation or assumption as in the Bible.
- In romantic comic modes, the setting is pastoral or idyllic, and there is an integration of the hero with an idealized simplified form of nature.
- High mimetic comedy involves a strong central protagonist who constructs his or her own society by brute force, fending off all opposition until the protagonist ends up with all honor and riches due him or her—the plays of Aristophanes or something like Shakespeare's Prospero are examples.
- Low mimetic comedy often shows the social elevation of the hero or heroine and often ends in marriage.
- Ironic comedy is perhaps more difficult, and Frye devotes a good deal more space to this than the other comedic modes. At one extreme, ironic comedy borders on savagery, the inflicting of pain on a helpless victim. Some examples of this include tales of lynch mobs, murder mysteries, or human sacrifice. Yet ironic comedy may also offer biting satire of a society replete with snobbery. It may even depict a protagonist rejected by society (thus failing the typical comic reintegration) yet who appears wiser than the rejecting society. Aristophanes, Ben Jonson, Molière, Henry Fielding, Sir Arthur Conan Doyle, and Graham Greene offer examples of the wide range of ironic comic possibility.

Finally, Frye explores the nature of thematic literature in each mode. Here, the intellectual content is more important than the plot, so these modes are organized by what is considered more authoritative or educational at the time. Also, these modes tend to organize by societal structure.

- In the mythical mode scripture, literature claiming divine inspiration is prevalent.
- In the romantic, the gods have retreated to the sky and it is up to chroniclers in a nomadic society to remember the lists of names of the patriarchs, the proverbs, traditions, charms, deeds, etc.
- In the high mimetic mode society is structured around a capital city, and "national" epics such as The Faerie Queene and The Lusiad are typical.
- In the low mimetic, thematic exposition tends toward individualism and romanticism. The individual author's own thoughts and ideas are now the center of authority, as instanced by William Wordsworth's Prelude.
- Finally, in the ironic mode, the poet figures as a mere observer rather than an authoritative commentator, producing writing that tends to emphasize discontinuity and anti-epiphany. T. S. Eliot's The Waste Land and James Joyce's Finnegans Wake exemplify this thematic mode.

=== "Ethical Criticism: Theory of Symbols" ===
Now that Frye has established his theory of modes, he proposes five levels, or phases, of symbolism, each phase independently possessing its own mythos, ethos, and dianoia as laid out in the first essay. These phases are based on the four levels of medieval allegory (the first two phases constituting the first level). Also, Frye relates the five phases with the ages of man laid out in the first essay. Frye defines a literary symbol as: "[A]ny unit of any literary structure that can be isolated for critical attention."

Symbolic phases:

- Literal/descriptive (motifs and signs)
- Formal (image)
- Mythical (archetype)
- Anagogic (monad)

The descriptive phase exhibits the centrifugal, or outward, property of a symbol. For example, when a word such as 'cat' evokes a definition, image, experience or any property connected with the word 'cat' external to the literary context of the particular usage, we have the word taken in the descriptive sense. Frye labels any such symbol a sign. He does not define the sign beyond this sense of pointing to the external, nor does he refer to any particular semiotic theory. In opposition to the sign stands the motif which is a symbol taken in the literal phase. This phase demonstrates the inward, or centripetal, direction of meaning, best described as the contextual meaning of the symbol. To Frye, literal means nearly the opposite of its usage in common speech; to say that something "literally" means something generally involves referring to a definition external to the text. Instead, literal refers to the symbol's meaning in its specific literary situation, while descriptive refers to personal connotation and conventional definition. Finally, Frye draws an analogy between rhythm and harmony with the literal and descriptive phases respectively. The literal phase tends to be horizontal, dependent on what comes before and after the symbol, while the descriptive phase tends to be laid out in space, having external meanings that vary in nearness to the contextual meaning.

Frye next introduces the formal phase, embodied by the image, in order to define the layer of meaning that results from the interplay of the harmony and rhythm of the signs and motifs. The most frequently repeated imagery sets the tone of the work (as with the color red in Macbeth), with less repeated imagery working in contrast with this tonal background. This section of the essay gives a faithful representation of literary formalism (also known as New Criticism). Frye's representation of formalism here is unique; however, its setting is part of the larger system of literary criticism Frye outlines in the entire work. The notion of form (and perhaps Frye's literal phase) relies heavily on the assumption of inherent meaning within the text—a point contested by deconstructionist critics.

The mythical phase is the treatment of a symbol as an archetype. This concept relates most closely with intertextuality and considers the symbol in a work as interconnected with similar symbolism throughout the entire body of literature. While Frye deals with myths and archetypes from a broader perspective in the third essay, in this section he focuses on the critical method of tracing a symbol's heritage through literary works both prior and subsequent to the work in question. Frye argues that convention is a vital part of literature and that copyright is harmful to the process of literary creation. Frye points to the use of convention in Shakespeare and Milton as examples to strengthen his argument that even verbatim copying of text and plot does not entail a death of creativity. Further, Frye argues that romantic, anti-conventional writers such as Walt Whitman tend to follow convention anyway. In criticism, the study of the archetypal phase of a symbol is akin to the "nature" perspective in the psychological debate over nature versus nurture. Rather than viewing the symbol as a unique achievement of the author or some inherent quality of the text, the archetypal phase situates the symbol in its society of literary kindred as a product of its conventional forebears.

Finally, Frye proposes an anagogic phase wherein a symbol is treated as a monad. The anagogic level of medieval allegory treated a text as expressing the highest spiritual meaning. For example, Dante's Beatrice in the Divine Comedy would represent the bride of Christ, i.e., the Catholic Church. Frye makes the argument that not only is there a lateral connection of archetypes through intertextuality, but that there is a transcendent almost spiritual unity within the body of literature. Frye describes the anagogic in literature as "the imitation of infinite social action and infinite human thought, the mind of a man who is all men, the universal creative word which is all words."

=== "Archetypal Criticism: Theory of Myths" ===
Frye begins the essay regarding myth as the source of all literature (as a visual, auditory and textual art form), paintings (as visual art form) and music (as an auditory art form). The underlying structures and patterns of all these forms are similar, though they have a unique style of their own.

Great Chain of Being applied to tragic and comedy vision by Frye
Six Worlds (as described in Great Chain of Being by Aristotle)	Mythical associations in Tragic vision	Mythical associations in Comic vision
Divine	angry, devilish God	God
Human	evil man, tyrant leader	good man, hero
Animal	birds of prey (wolf, serpent, vulture)	lamb
Vegetable	tree of death, sinister forest, cactus	Garden of Eden
Mineral (applied to city)	desert, rock, ruined castles	Bethlehem in Jerusalem, temple
Water	sea of destruction, water of death, sea monsters	water of life, wine

The third essay is the culmination of Frye's theory in that it unites the elements of characterization and each of the five symbolic phases presented in the first two essays into an organic whole. This whole is organized around a metaphor of human desire and frustration as manifested in the Great Chain of Being (divine, human, animal, vegetable, mineral and water) by analogy to the four seasons.

Seasons and their analogies to genres, life and myths by Frye
Season	Genres	Life Cycle	Associated Myth
Spring	Comedy	Birth (life)	Myth of birth
Summer	Romance	Youth, Growth	Myth of triumph, harmony
Autumn/fall	Tragedy	Old, Maturity	Myth of fall, decay, separation
Winter	Irony	Death	Myth of chaos, death, darkness

At one pole we have apocalyptic imagery which typifies the revelation of heaven and ultimate fulfillment of human desire. In this state, the literary structure points toward unification of all things in a single analogical symbol. The ultimate of the divine is the deity, of the human is Christ (or any other being that embodies the oneness of humanity in its spiritual culmination), of the animal is the lamb, of the vegetable is the Tree of Life or vine, and of the mineral is the heavenly Jerusalem or city of God.

At the opposite pole lies demonic imagery which typifies the unfulfillment, perversion, or opposition of human desire. In this state, things tend toward anarchy or tyranny. The divine is an angry, inscrutable God demanding sacrifice, the human is the tyrannical anti-Christ, the animal is a predator such as a lion, the vegetable is the evil wood as found at the beginning of Dante's Inferno or Hawthorne's "Young Goodman Brown", and the city is the dystopia embodied by Orwell's 1984 or Kafka's The Castle.

Great Chain of Being applied to different types of imagery discussed by Frye
Six Worlds (as described in Great Chain of Being by Aristotle)	Apocalyptic imagery (heavenly)	Demonic imagery (hellish)	Analogical imagery		
Six Worlds (as described in Great Chain of Being by Aristotle)	Apocalyptic imagery (heavenly)	Demonic imagery (hellish)	Analogy of Innocence	Analogy of Experience	Analogy of Nature & Reason
Divine	God, Christ	angry God	Christ	(very little space)	king with courtly love mistress
Human	good man, hero	tyrants, dictators, leaders with evil ego	children	(parody of ideal life)	king with courtly love mistress
Animal	lamb	dragon, vulture, serpent, wolf	lamb	ape, tiger, chimpanzee	horse (animal of proud beauty), unicorn, Phoenix
Vegetable	Garden	tree of death, sinister forest	Garden of Eden	farm, agricultural field	garden with large building
Mineral (applied to city)	Bethlehem in Jerusalem, city of God	desert, abandoned castle	Bethlehem in Jerusalem	labyrinth in modern acropolis, wasteland	city with court at center
Water	water of life, river	water of death, sea monsters, sea-storm, whirlpool, snow	wine, river water	destructive sea (salty, polluted sea)	Thames (as disciplined river)

Finally we have the analogical imagery, or more simply, depictions of states that are similar to paradise or hell, but not identical. There is a great deal of variety in the imagery of these structures, but tame animals and wise rulers are common in structures analogical to the apocalyptic (analogy of innocence), while predatory aristocrats and masses living in squalor characterize analogy to the demonic (analogy of experience).

Frye then identifies the mythical mode with the apocalyptic, the ironic with the demonic, and the romantic and low mimetic with their respective analogies. The high mimetic, then, occupies the center of all four. This ordering allows Frye to place the modes in a circular structure and point to the cyclical nature of myth and archetypes. In this setting, literature represents the natural cycle of birth, growth, maturity, decline, death, resurrection, rebirth, and the repetition of the cycle. The remainder of the chapter deals with the cycle of the four seasons as embodied by four mythoi: comedy, romance, tragedy, and irony or satire.

=== "Rhetorical Criticism: Theory of Genres" ===
In the first three essays, Frye deals mainly with the first three elements of Aristotle's elements of poetry (i.e. mythos, ethos, dianoia). In the fourth essay, he explores the last three elements:

- melos – the element dealing with the tonal, musical aspect of literature
- lexis – the written word, lying somewhere between musical and visual aspects. It may be referred to as diction (ear) or imagery (eye) depending on the critical focus.
- opsis – the element dealing with visual aspects of literature

Whereas mythos is the verbal imitation of action and dianoia the verbal imitation of thought (ethos being composed of the two), melos and opsis (with lexis composed of the two) correspond, though seen from a different (rhetorical) perspective. Frye identifies the connection as such: "The world of social action and event ... has a particularly strong association with the ear. ... The world of individual thought and idea has a correspondingly close connection with the eye ..." (Frye, 243).

Rhetoric means two things: ornamental (opsis) speech and persuasive (melos) speech. Rhetorical criticism, then, is the exploration of literature in the light of melos, opsis, and their interplay as manifested in lexis.

The radical of presentation—the relation (or idealized relation) between author and audience—is a further consideration. Difference in genre relies not on topical considerations (science fiction, romance, mystery), nor in length (e.g. epics are long, lyrics are short), but in the radical of presentation. As such, Frye proposes a total of four distinct genres:

- epos – Author speaks directly to audience (e.g. story telling, formal speech).
- fiction – Author and audience are hidden from each other (e.g. most novels).
- drama – Author is hidden from the audience; audience experiences content directly.
- lyric – Audience is "hidden" from author; that is, the speaker is "overheard" by hearers.

These four genres form the organizing principle of the essay, first examining the distinctive kind of rhythm of each, then looking at specific forms of each more closely. As Frye describes each genre, he explains the function of melos and opsis in each. Frye contends that the common usage of the term "musical" is inaccurate for purposes of criticism, drawn from analogy with harmony, a stable relationship. Music, however, does not consist of a plastic, static, continuously stable relationship, but rather a series of dissonances resolving at the end into a stable relationship. Poetry containing little dissonance, then, has more in common with the plastic arts than with music.

The original presentation of the epic was ta epe (that which is spoken), and when an author, speaker, or storyteller addresses a visible audience directly, we have epos. The rhythm of epos is that of recurrence (i.e. accent, meter, sound patterns). These are the rhythms most commonly associated with poetry.

"Fiction" is a vague term which Frye uses to avoid introducing too many new terms. Part of the difficulty comes from the fact that this is the only of the four genres which has no precedent in antiquity. He acknowledges having used the term previously in a different sense. In this essay, the term refers to literature in which the author addresses the audience through a book, or more simply stated, prose. The rhythm of prose is that of continuity of meaning.

Drama lies halfway between epos and fiction, or more accurately, its diction must fit the setting and the character. Some characters may be melos-oriented, speaking in meter or with various rhetorical effects in song and banter. Others may be opsis-oriented, speaking more in prose and conveying ideological content. Most characters alternate according to the dramatic situation. Such a marriage of the appropriate language with the character and setting (ethos) defines a rhythm of decorum, the distinctive rhythm of drama.

Classical lyrical poetry often presents a shepherd speaking of his love; he is overheard by his audience. However, the distinctiveness of lyric comes more from its peculiar rhythm than from this radical of representation. Frye describes this rhythm as associative rather than logical and is the stuff of dreams and the subconscious. It is closely related to the chant, and though it is found in all literature, it is more apparent in certain kinds of literature than others. At this point Frye suggests a connection between the four historical modes and the four genres. In this sense, the lyrical is typical of the ironic age—just as the ironic protagonist has turned away from society, the lyrical poet makes utterances without regard to the audience. The lyrical rhythm is seen in Joyce's Finnegans Wake, a work based almost entirely on associative babbles and dream utterance.

== Miscellaneous ==
- The Latin dedication at the beginning, "Helenae Uxori" is to Northrop's wife, Helen.
- Bergson's Laughter may provide a complementary view on comedy.
- The book evolved out of an introduction to Spenser's The Faerie Queene: "the introduction to Spenser became an introduction to the theory of allegory" Frye allowed (p. vii).

== See also ==
- Archetypal literary criticism – larger genre of criticism to which the "Archetypal Criticism: A Theory of Myths" essay belongs.
- Green World – a concept introduced in the "Archetypal Criticism: A Theory of Myths" essay but not specifically covered in this article.
