= The Secular Scripture =

Essay collection by Northrop Frye

The Secular Scripture: A Study of the Structure of Romance
- Author: Northrop Frye
- Language: English
- Publisher: Harvard University Press
- Publication date: 1976
- Pages: 200
- ISBN: 978-0674796768

The Secular Scripture: A Study of the Structure of Romance is a collection of essays by the Canadian literary critic Northrop Frye. The collection was originally published in 1976. It has been reviewed by E. D. Blodgett, Harold Bloom, John P. Brennan, M. W. Copeland, L. S. Dembo, Lynn Dickerson, A. C. Hamilton, Carl Lindahl, Mavor Moore, William Nelson, Barbara Nelson Sargent, Luis Ellicott Yglesias, and an anonymous reviewer.
