= Huillard =

Huillard may refer to:

- Paul Huillard (1875-1996), French designer and architect
- Xavier Huillard (born 1954), French business executive

== See also ==
- Beauchamps-sur-Huillard, a commune in the Loiret department in north-central France
- Chevillon-sur-Huillard, a commune in the Loiret department in north-central France
- Guillard, a surname
