= Reading the World =

2025 documentary film about Paulo Freire

- Lendo o Mundo
- Directed by: Catherine Murphy; Iris de Oliveira
- Produced by: Micaela Ovelar; Carina Aparecida; Rachel Dickson
- Release date: 2025
- Running time: 70 minutes
- Countries: Brazil; United States

Reading the World (Portuguese: Lendo o Mundo) is a 2025 Brazilian–American documentary film directed by Catherine Murphy and Iris de Oliveira. It examines the adult literacy project led by Brazilian educator Paulo Freire in Angicos, Rio Grande do Norte, in 1963. The film won Best Feature Documentary at the 2025 Gramado Film Festival.

== Synopsis ==
The documentary revisits the Angicos literacy project through the recollections of former learners and educators, alongside archival footage and photographs. It explores the project's culture circles, in which reading and writing were taught through discussion of participants' everyday experiences, and places the initiative in the political context preceding the 1964 Brazilian coup d'état. It also addresses Freire's subsequent exile.

The archival material includes extracts from Twenty Years Later and Maioria Absoluta, images of Francisco Julião and the Peasant Leagues, and photographs from the personal collection of Marcos Guerra, who worked with Freire in Angicos.

== Production ==
The film was produced by Micaela Ovelar, Carina Aparecida and Rachel Dickson, with the Instituto Paulo Freire as co-producer. Iris de Oliveira, Renato Maia, Mara Wollong and Luis Dechtiar are credited as its writers and editors. Executive producers include Petra Costa, Kit Miller and T. M. Scruggs.

== Festival screenings and awards ==
Reading the World screened in the documentary feature competition at the 2025 Gramado Film Festival. It received the festival's award for Best Feature Documentary.
