= Fearful Symmetry (book) =

1947 book by Northrop Frye

Fearful Symmetry: A Study of William Blake
- Cover of the first edition
- Author: Northrop Frye
- Language: English
- Genre: Literary criticism
- Publisher: Princeton University Press
- Publication date: 1947
- Publication place: United States
- Media type: Print (Hardback & Paperback)
- Pages: 462
- OCLC: 29097
- Dewey Decimal: 821.7
- LC Class: PR4147 .F7 1969

Fearful Symmetry: A Study of William Blake is a 1947 book by Canadian literary critic Northrop Frye whose subject is the work of English poet and visual artist William Blake. The book has been hailed as one of the most important contributions to the study of William Blake and one of the first that embarked on the interpretation of many of Blake's most obscure works. As Frye himself acknowledges, Blake's work is not to be deciphered but interpreted and seen within its specific historical and social contexts.

In his preface of the 1969 edition, Frye writes:

"I wrote Fearful Symmetry during the Second World War, and hideous as the time was, it provided some parallels with Blake's time which were useful for understanding Blake's attitude to the world. Today, now that reactionary and radical forces alike are once more in the grip of the nihilistic psychosis that Blake described so powerfully in Jerusalem, one of the most hopeful signs is the immensely increased sense of the urgency and immediacy of what Blake had to say".

== Reception ==
Literary critic Camille Paglia writes in Sexual Personae (1990), that Fearful Symmetry is a "pioneering study", but that Frye "optimistically promotes sexual liberation in a way that seems, a weary generation later, simplistic and naive."
