= Green World =

Literary concept defined by Northrop Frye in 1957

Green World is a literary concept defined by the critic Northrop Frye in his book Anatomy of Criticism (1957). Frye defines this term using Shakespeare's romantic comedies as the foundation. In Anatomy of Criticism, Frye describes the Green World as "the archetypal function of literature in visualizing the world of desire, not as an escape from "reality," but as the genuine form of the world that human life tries to imitate." The plots of these comedies often follow the formula of action starting in the normal world and then progressing to an alternate one in which the conflict is resolved before returning to the normal world. The plot of the Shakespearean romantic comedy is built upon the tradition established by the medieval "season ritual-play," the plots of which thematically deal with the triumph of love over the wasteland. The concept of the Green World is used to contrast the civilized world of man with the often harsh natural world.

== Presence in Literature ==
As noted in Frye's Anatomy of Criticism, the "drama of the green world" is embodied in the works of William Shakespeare. The thematic tones of the plays contain the overarching appearance of humanity eclipsing the natural worlds displayed.

=== In Shakespearean Works ===
A Midsummer Night's Dream serves as an exploration of the green world through the fairies' interference in the romantic entanglement of the Athenian lovers. The majority of the play's action takes place in the woods outside of Theseus' Athens, with Shakespeare primarily using Athens to frame the narrative in civilization. The woods of A Midsummer Night's Dream serves as an analogy to a dream-like world created out of our desires that serves to contrast the "stumbling and blinded follies of the world of experience."

As You Like It also contains considerable references to the green world. The Forest of Arden is both idealized through the usage of pastoral terms, but is also depicted in a way that shows how humans manipulate and exploit it. While the play makes use of typical pastoral motifs in describing the forest, these are often juxtaposed with images of the wood as a wild place–showing a dialectic tension between the new inhabitants and long standing forest.

The Two Gentlemen of Verona also presents an image of the literary green world. The comedy's protagonist, Valentine, enters the woods and shortly becomes the leader of a band of outlaws; afterwards, however, the other characters all venture out into the forest and become converted. As Frye notes using this example: "...the action of the comedy begins in a world represented by as a normal world, moves into the green world, goes into a metamorphosis there in which the comic resolution is achieved, and returns to the normal world."

=== In Sir Gawain and the Green Knight ===
In Sir Gawain and the Green Knight, the Green Knight is completely green, right down to his skin: he is "nature anthropomorphized." He challenges King Arthur's court by accusing them of being too indulgent rather than courageous. Sir Gawain must travel through winter's brutal conditions to arrive at Bertilak's court, which is described [by... ] as the "antithesis of winter." Despite Sir Gawain being attacked by "unnamed giants," it is made clear that the greatest threat to his survival is the harsh winter landscape as made evident in line 726 of the poem: "For werre wrathed hym not so much þat wynter nas wors."

Upon entering this alternate world, Sir Gawain is surrounded by abundance and warmth. The Green World is represented both by the frightening challenge made by the Green Knight, as well as by the refuge of Bertilak's court. Nature's cruel forcefulness as well as its power to protect are aspects of the Green World, as it offers an alternate reality in which a problem is resolved. The Green Knight, representing nature, threatens the comfortable lives of the members of King Arthur's court. The Green Chapel is described as a bare wasteland which shows another way in which nature is presented.

== Relationship to Ecocriticism ==
- Ecocriticism
- Literary criticism
- Shakespearean comedy
- William Shakespeare

== Sources ==
- Forker, Charles (1985). "The Green Underworld of Early Shakespearean Tragedy". Shakespearean Studies. 27: 26–27. ISSN 0582-9399.
- Frye, Northrop (2000). Anatomy of Criticism (15th ed.). Princeton University Press. ISBN 0-691-06004-5.
- Goldhurst, William (November 1958). "The Green and the Gold: The Major Theme of Gawain and the Green Knight". College English. 20 (2). National Council of Teachers of English: 61–65. doi:10.2307/372161. ISSN 0010-0994. JSTOR 372161.
- Rudd, Gillian (2014). "Being Green in Late Medieval English Literature". In Garrard, Greg (ed.). The Oxford Handbook of Ecocriticism. Oxford Handbooks. Oxford University Press. pp. 27–39. ISBN 9780199742929.
- Siewers, Alfred (2014). "The Green Otherworlds of Early Medieval Literature". In Westling, Louise (ed.). The Cambridge Companion to Literature and the Environment. Cambridge: Cambridge University Press. pp. 45–58. doi:10.1017/CCO9781139342728. ISBN 9781139342728 – via Cambridge Core.
- Sobecki, Sebastian (2006). "Nature's Farthest Verge or Landscapes beyond Allegory and Rhetorical Convention? The Case of Sir Gawain and the Green Knight and Petrarch's Ascent of Mount Ventoux". Studia Anglica Posnaniensia. 42. Adam Mickiewicz University in Poznań: 463–475.
- Umunç, Himmet (December 2015). "The Green Shakespeare: An Ecocritical Reading". Edebiyat Fakültesi Dergisi/Journal of Faculty of Letters. 32 (2). ISSN 1301-5737.
