= Cuban literacy campaign =

- Part of the Consolidation of the Cuban Revolution
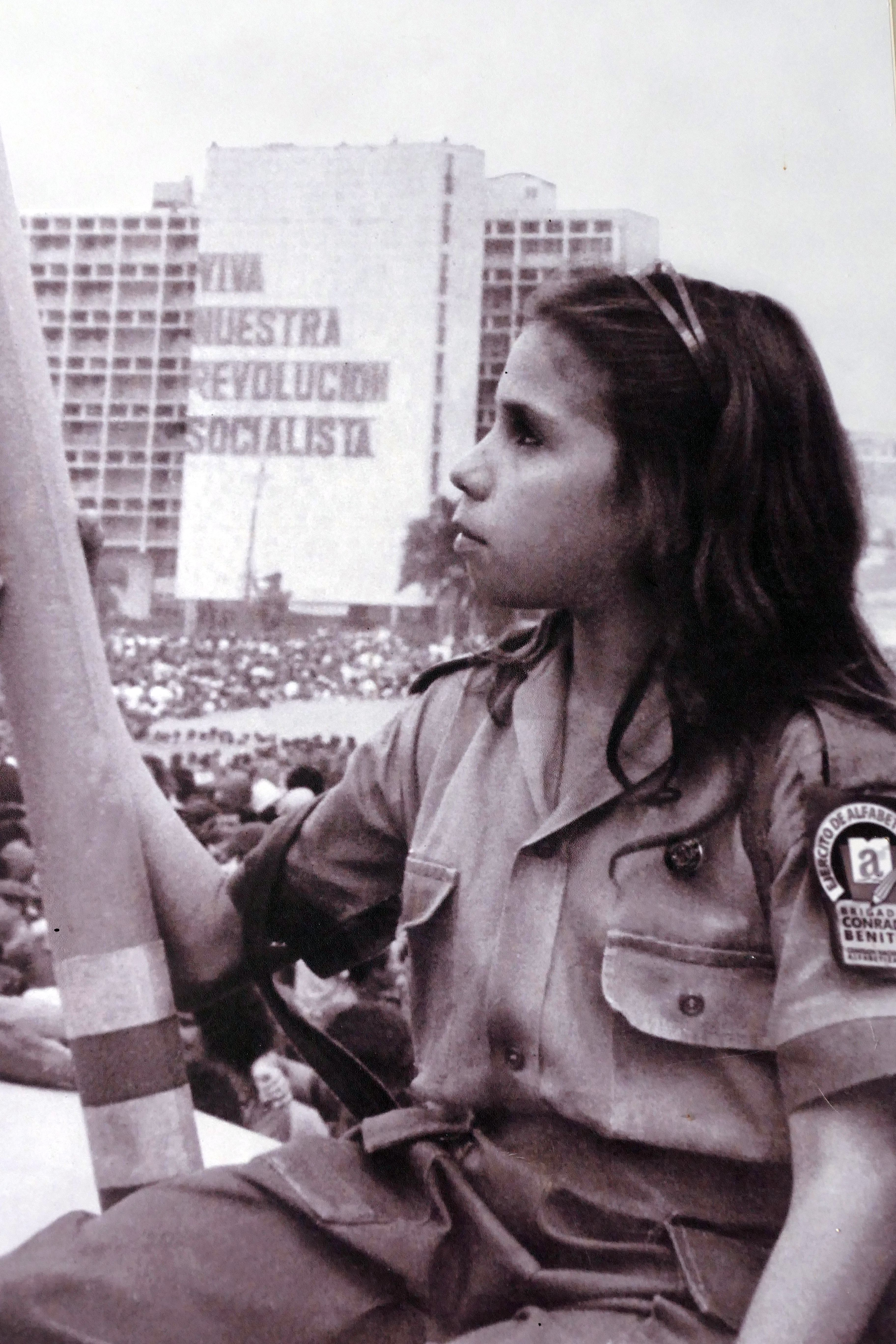
- Young literacy brigadista in Cuba.
- Date: 1960 - 1961
- Location: Cuba
- Participants: Conrado Benitez Brigadistas, adolescent volunteer teachers in the countryside.; Alfabetizadores populares, adult volunteer teachers in cities.; Patria o Muerte Brigadistas, adult working teachers in cities.; Brigadistas Obreros, adult organizers of the campaign.
- Outcome: International literacy campaigns developed; Majority of Cubans made literate; Militarization of education in Cuba; Due to rumors, parents put children into Operation Peter Pan

The Cuban literacy campaign (Spanish: Campaña Nacional de Alfabetización en Cuba) was an eight-month long effort to abolish illiteracy in Cuba after the Cuban Revolution.

== Background ==
=== Reforms ===
The dictator Fulgencio Batista was overthrown by an armed guerrilla movement known as the 26th of July Movement (Movimiento 26 de Julio) on January 1, 1959. The new revolutionary government, led by Fidel Castro and Che Guevara, immediately began a series of social and economic reforms. Among these were agrarian reform, health care reform, and education reform, all of which dramatically improved the quality of life among the lowest sectors of Cuban society.

=== Emigration ===
During the turmoil of the first several years of the revolution, the flight of many skilled workers caused a “brain drain.” This loss of human capital sparked a renovation of the Cuban education system to accommodate the instruction of new workers, who would take the place of those who had emigrated from the country.

=== Ideological developments ===
In addition to the renewal of Cuba's infrastructure, there were strong ideological reasons for education reform. In pre-Revolutionary Cuba, there was a dichotomy between urban citizens and rural citizens (who were often agricultural workers). The Cuban Revolution was driven by the need for equality, particularly among these classes. Before the campaign, the rate of illiteracy among city dwellers was 11% compared to 41.7% in the countryside.

The Literacy Campaign was designed to force contact between sectors of society that would not usually interact. So much so that the government placed urban teachers in rural environments, where they were pushed to become like the peasants in order to break down social barriers. As Fidel Castro put it in 1961 while addressing literacy teachers, “You will teach, and you will learn.” Volunteers from the city were often ignorant of the poor conditions of rural citizens until their experiences during this campaign. Besides literacy, the campaign aimed to create a collective identity of “unity, [an] attitude of combat, courage, intelligence, and a sense of history.” Politicized educational materials were used to further these ideals. Furthermore, Castro went as far as to state the need for the rural populations to take on the role of teacher, educating the urban populations. The effort was labeled a movement of “the people” and gave citizens a common goal, increasing solidarity.

== History ==
The first whispers of the Cuban Literacy Campaign came about in the form of a preparatory period that lasted between September and December 1960. The efforts to prepare for the Literacy Campaign were vast and complicated while demanding the inclusion of many departments of government to ensure the success of educating and locating brigadistas, providing oversight to them, and ensuring their successful return home. Additionally, the success of the pedagogical tools and theory can be credited to Dr. Ana Echegoyen de Cañizares, a feminist Afro-Cuban scholar credited for leading the pedagogical efforts of the Campaign in Cuba and in Latin America.

=== First Stage ===
Flag used by students in San Juan y Martínez to spread the 'Year of Education'

Following this period, the campaign was set to be implemented through a 3-stage program. This occurred in 1961, a time also known as the 'Year of Education'. The first stage consisted of professional educators training the literacy brigade — known as the Alfabetizadores populares — the curriculum and familiarizing them with the text that would be used to teach their students. This book, which had been written specifically for the purposes of the campaign was titled, Alfabeticemos (English: Let's Teach Literacy), brigaders were also exposed to the student primer, which would help them to better educate their students. This primer is better known by its title, Venceremos (English: We Shall Overcome). This training time ran from January until late April in 1961.

=== Second Stage ===
Beginning in April, Fidel elected to close schools down early for the summer. He did so in order to allow students to supplement their missed class time by joining the literacy campaign and teach illiterate adults. This plan saw a number of students encouraged to join the campaign, approximately 105,664, and together they formed the Conrado Benitez Brigadistas. These students were put through a week-long intensive training to prepare them for the challenge ahead.

=== Third Stage ===
In an effort to intensify the campaign, and ensure its success before the end of the year, Castro began to recruit more "educators" from the factories, and those who enlisted formed the Patria o Muerte worker's brigade. This was the final effort to identify the remaining members of the population who were still illiterate, and find those who were struggling the most. Those who were unsuccessful in the traditional program were placed in acceleration camps to help them overcome illiteracy within Castro's one year timeline.

== Organization ==
=== Volunteers ===
It is estimated that 1,000,000 Cubans were directly involved (as teachers or students) in the Literacy Campaign. There were four categories of workers:

1. “Conrado Benitez” Brigade (Conrado Benitez Brigadistas)—100,000 young volunteers (ages 10–19) who left school to live and work with students in the countryside. The number of students leaving schools to volunteer was so great that an alternative education was put in place for 8 months of the 1961 school year.
2. Popular Alphabetizers (Alfabetizadores populares )—Adults who volunteered to teach in cities or towns. It is documented that 13,000 factory workers held classes for their illiterate co-workers after hours. This group includes the individuals who taught friends, neighbors, or family members out of their homes.
3. “Fatherland or Death” Brigade (Patria o Muerte Brigadistas)—A group of 15,000 adult workers who were paid to teach in remote rural locations through an arrangement that their co-workers would fill in for them, so that the workforce remained strong.
4. Schoolteacher Brigades—A group of 15,000 professional teachers who oversaw the technical and organizational aspects of the campaign. As 1961 progressed, their involvement grew to the extent that most teachers participated full-time for a majority of the campaign. The "Fatherland or Death" brigade, along with the Schoolteacher brigade, is sometimes simply referred to as the Workers' Brigade (Brigadistas Obreros).

The government provided teaching supplies to volunteers. Workers who traveled to rural locations to teach received a standard grey uniform, a warm blanket, a hammock, two textbooks — Alfabeticemos and Venceremos — and a gas-powered lantern, so that lessons could be given at night after work ended.

The campaign aimed to bring Cubans up to a standard reading level. The benchmark was set at achieving the reading ability of a first grader, a limit that allowed the organization to be more efficient and effective.

=== Gender roles ===
Pre-revolution, the role of women fit the patriarchal notions of a post-colonial nation, in which women were meant to remain in the cult of domesticity, rarely allowed outside without an escort, and had very limited access to educational or professional opportunities. While much of the rhetoric surrounding the Cuban Literacy Campaign was focused on the creation of a new and better kind of man, it is important to recognize that with this came revolutionary changes in the roles of women in Cuba. While the campaign was mostly targeted towards men, over half of the educators who volunteered to further the effort were women. Many women also acted as beneficiaries, making them essential to the success of the program and contributors in a number of aspects. The narrative set forth by Castro himself and the campaign as transforming education, a typically female space, into one that was militarized offered the framework for women to be defiant and participate in the movement. Ultimately, women were empowered by leaving home, with or without support from their families, able to reach further education opportunities after the campaign, and contribute to the changing Cuban culture. Despite the persisting presence of patriarchy in Cuba, these young women and brigadistas made contributions to change the new culture emerging in a post-Revolutionary socialist Cuba.

=== Militarization of education ===
Women taking up the role of educators was not a new occurrence in Cuba, but the militarization of the role came about in conjunction with the Cuban Literacy Campaign. Castro himself claimed in a speech given in May 1961, that the Cuban Revolution had two armies, the militias commonly associated with the revolution, and his "army of literacy teachers" or alfabetizadores who were responsible for waging war against illiteracy.

A traditional responsibility of women was made to fit the Cuban ideals of heroism and service through means of militarization. The volunteers of the campaign were treated much like soldiers, organized into the aforementioned brigades, and were provided clothing resembling military fatigues regardless of their gender. From such a perspective the campaign is shrouded in hyper-masculinity, hiding the fact that women were a large driving force of the effort under the guise of "masculine ideals".

== Effects ==
Cuban man being educated in a hospital in 1969 that was built during the literacy campaign.

Hundreds of thousands of alfabetizadores marched to the Plaza de la Revolucion on December 22nd 1961, carrying giant pencils, chanting, "Fidel Fidel tell us what else we can do". "Study, study, study!" came the reply.

=== Opposition ===
Young teachers were sometimes murdered by insurgents in the Escambray rebellion due to their ties to the Cuban government. There are numerous accusations that these militants were backed by the United States Government.

Supporters of the revolution who were too young or otherwise unable to participate in the downfall of Fulgencio Batista saw the campaign as an opportunity to contribute to the success of the new government and hoped to instill a revolutionary consciousness in their students. Many of the instructional texts used during the Literacy Campaign focused on the history of the Revolution and had strong political messages, which made the movement a target of opposition.

Some parents who were fearful of their children being put under military supervision and made to leave their homes to teach, had their children leave Cuba through Operation Peter Pan.

=== Education in Cuba ===
"Before 1959 it was the countryside versus the city. The literacy campaign united the country because, for the first time, people from the city understood how hard life was for people before the revolution, that they survived on their own, and that as people they had much in common. This was very important for the new government."

— Luisa Yara Campos, Cuban literacy museum director

Many of the Literacy Campaign's volunteers went on to pursue teaching careers, and the rate of teachers is now 11 times higher than it was before the revolution. Before the revolutionary government nationalized schools, private institutions often excluded large segments of society; wealthy Cubans often received exemplary instruction in private schools, while children of the working class received low-quality education or did not attend school at all. Education became accessible to a much larger segment of the population after 1959. The percentage of children enrolled in school in Cuba (ages 6–12) increased dramatically over the years:

- 1953—56%
- 1970—88%
- 1986—nearly 100%

It is estimated that 268,000 Cubans worked to eliminate illiteracy during the Year of Education, and around 707,000 Cubans became literate by December 22, 1961. By 1962, the country's literacy rate was 96%, one of the highest in the world. With a surge in educated students, there was also an increased demand for teachers to fill schools and continue educating the masses that were now literate. The students were meant to continue their education as the government made it more accessible to achieve higher learning in the following years.

The success of the campaign is owed in part to the fact that it brought the systematic issues in the country to the attention of the government. Major issues like health and healthcare in Cuba, as well the lack of accessibility for child care, and other disadvantages largely determined by class, were proving to be barriers to education in Cuba. This enlightenment allowed them to alter some of the structural issues that were inhibiting the overall education level of Cubans. Additionally, medicine and education became primary pieces of the new society post-Revolution, they were to exemplify the rhetoric of the "New Man" set forth by Che Guevara, a former doctor.

The original literacy campaign of 1961 was part of a broader plan for educating the population beyond simple literacy at a 1st grade level which was named the Battle for the First Grade. The end of the literacy battles was the success of the Battle for the Ninth Grade waged in the early 1980s and by 1989 the literacy level of the island was above the ninth grade level. However, by 1980 1.5 million participating adults had already achieved the sixth grade reading level and were already in the planning to continue a path of permanent education for all.

=== International education campaigns ===
Cuban literacy educators trained during the campaign went on to assist in literacy campaigns in 15 other countries, for which a Cuban organization was awarded the King Sejong Literacy Prize by UNESCO. Additionally, over the past 50 years, thousands of Cuban literacy teachers have volunteered in countries such as Haiti, Nicaragua and Mozambique. The success of international literacy campaigns can be attributed to a flexible model developed by a team of Cubans led by Leonela Relys, a former brigadista, entitled Yo sí puedo (Yes I can) which gained momentum with each successful country adaption including Nicaragua's literacy campaign in the 1980s. The literacy campaigns were even further propelled into the international stage by the 2004 creation of the Bolivarian Alliance for the Peoples of Our America (Spanish: Alianza Bolivariana para los Pueblos de Nuestra America, ALBA). Now, the campaigns are present in 26 countries around the world and proof of the successful campaigns continues to be verified by UNESCO, which declared five Latin American countries free of illiteracy (Cuba, Venezuela, Ecuador, Bolivia, Nicaragua). However, not all exported programs are as successful such as the case of Timor-Leste in which changes in government, several spoken languages and the lack of a post-literacy program all unite to create dangerous circumstances in which literacy campaign students might revert to illiteracy.

== Legacy ==
The Museum for the National Literacy Campaign (Museo Nacional de la Campaña de Alfabetización) is located in Escolar Libertad city and was inaugurated December 29, 1964. The thank-you letters to Fidel Castro, used by UNESCO to evaluate the success of the campaign in 1964, are kept with photographs and details of all 100,000 volunteers in a museum in La Ciudad Libertad (City of Liberty), which is in Fulgencio Batista's vast former headquarters in the western suburbs of Havana. Among the other prized possessions of the museum are samples of the manuals for brigadistas and the books meant for their students, the UNESCO report that cemented the success of the literacy campaign, and newspapers from the time as well as video footage of the volunteers work. The Museum's goal, like the goal of many other museums across the world is to preserve, conserve, and publicize the formation of a heritage, ideology, society, or feat. The efforts of the museum go beyond conservation and is open to the community, researchers, schools, with a commitment to continue educating on the history of the literacy campaign as it spreads to other parts of the world.

In 2011, producer and director Catherine Murphy released the 33-minute documentary Maestra about the Cuban literacy campaign. The film includes interviews with volunteers who taught during the campaign and archival footage from 1961. Catherine Murphy documents the transgressions of gender roles by young female volunteers against their families and the passion of youth that were too young to participate in the Revolution but eager to participate in the Literacy Campaign.
