= The Well-Tempered Critic (Frye book) =

Book by Northrop Frye

- First edition
- Author: Northrop Frye
- Language: English
- Genre: Essay collection
- Publisher: Indiana University Press
- Publication date: 1963
- Publication place: United States

The Well-Tempered Critic is a collection of essays by the Canadian literary critic Northrop Frye. The collection was originally published in Bloomington, Indiana, by the Indiana University Press in 1963.

The collection presents lectures delivered by Frye at the University of Virginia in March 1961 for the Page-Barbour Foundation, with a certain amount of expansion and some revisions.
