= Maestra (film) =

- Film poster
- Directed by: Catherine Murphy
- Written by: Eve Goldberg
- Produced by: Catherine Murphy
- Starring: Alice Walker; Diana Balboa; Norma Guillard
- Distributed by: Women Make Movies
- Release date: April 6, 2011 (La Pena Cultural Center)
- Running time: 33 minutes
- Country: Cuba
- Languages: English, Spanish

Maestra is a short documentary film directed by Catherine Murphy, about the youngest women teachers of the 1961 Cuban Literacy Campaign.

In 1961, Cuba aimed to eradicate illiteracy in one year. It sent 250,000 volunteers across the island to teach reading and writing in rural communities for one year. 100,000 of the volunteers were under 18 and more than half of them were women.

In 2004, Murphy discovered that she knew several women in Havana who had volunteered for the project; they were in their 60s. Murphy was due to return to the United States, but before doing so, she decided to record three interviews with former Literacy Campaign volunteers. From 2004 to 2010, Murphy continued to track down stories of Literacy Campaign volunteers and the families that hosted them, eventually producing and directing Maestra and founding The Literacy Project.

The film is narrated in English by Pulitzer Prize–winning author Alice Walker and features Spanish-language interviews (with English subtitles) with nine of the women who taught in the Campaign. Maestra features interviews with Norma Guillard, one of the first Cuban women to call herself a feminist, and Diana Balboa, one of the first open members of Cuba's LGBT community and an international advocate for gay and lesbian rights. Both were 15 years old at the time of the campaign.

== Accolades ==
Maestra premiered in the United States in April 2011 with two screenings in San Francisco, CA.

The film has won the following awards:

- Black Maria Film Festival, winner Director's Choice Award
- Ojai Film Festival, Honorable Mention

Maestra has screened at the following film festivals:

- Workers Unite! Film Festival, New York City, NY, USA, May 2014
- Workers Film Festival, San Diego, CA, USA, 2014
- Sarasota Film Festival, Sarasota, FL, USA, April 2014
- New Hampshire Film Festival, Portsmouth, NH, USA, 2013
- Los Angeles Latino International Film Festival, Los Angeles, CA, USA, 2013
- Louisville's International Festival of Film, Louisville, KY, USA, 2013
- New York African Diaspora International Film Festival, New York City, NY, USA, 2013
- Raindance Film Festival, London, UK, 2012
- LA Femme International Film Festival, Los Angeles, CA, USA, 2012.
- Legacy Media Institute International Film Festival, Petersburg, VA, USA as part of the Traveling Caribbean Showcase, 2013
- Traverse City Film Festival, Traverse City, MI, USA, 2012

== Distribution ==
Maestra is distributed by Women Make Movies, a nonprofit organization founded in 1971 to address the under-representation and misrepresentation of women in media that facilitates the production, promotion, distribution, and exhibition of independent films by and about women.
