= The Bush Garden =

- Author: Northrop Frye
- Cover artist: Hilary Norman
- Language: English
- Subject: Canadian literature and art
- Publisher: House of Anansi
- Publication date: 1971
- Publication place: Canada
- Pages: 256 + x
- ISBN: 978-0-88784-620-5
- LC Class: 71-152412

The Bush Garden: Essays on the Canadian Imagination is a collection of essays by Canadian literary critic Northrop Frye (1912–1991). The collection was originally published in 1971; it was republished, with an introduction by Canadian postmodern theorist Linda Hutcheon, in 1995. The Bush Garden features analyses of Canadian poetry, prose fiction and painting. According to Frye's introduction, the essays were selected to provide a composite view of the Canadian imagination, an understanding of the human imagination's reaction to and development in response to the Canadian environment.

The Bush Garden includes an edited version of Frye's "Conclusion" to Carl F. Klinck’s Literary History of Canada. In this work, Frye articulated his theory of "garrison mentality" as the defining characteristic of Canadian literature. Garrison mentality is the attitude of a community that feels isolated from cultural centres and besieged by a hostile landscape. Frye maintained that such communities were peculiarly Canadian, and fostered a literature that was formally immature, that displayed deep moral discomfort with “uncivilized” nature, and whose narratives reinforced social norms and values.

== Criticism ==
Although Frye asserted that his picture of Canadian self-image was unique to Canada, the picture of a civilization, led by patrilineal founders and establishing itself within a hostile or potentially hostile landscape, is in fact a recurring theme of the foundation myths told by a wide variety of cultures about themselves.

== Contents ==
- Author's Preface
- From "Letters in Canada" (University of Toronto Quarterly)

(originally published in the University of Toronto Quarterly 1950–1959)

- Canada and Its Poetry

(originally published in The Book of Canadian Poetry, A. J. M. Smith, editor. 1943)

- The Narrative Tradition in English-Canadian Poetry

(originally published in 1946)

- Turning New Leaves

(originally published in Folk Songs of Canada, Edith Fulton Fowke and Richard Johnston, editors, 1954)

- Preface to an Uncollected Anthology

(originally published in 1956)

- Silence in the Sea

(originally published in 1968)

- Canadian and Colonial Painting

(originally published in 1940)

- David Milne: An Appreciation

(originally published in 1948)

- Lawren Harris: An Introduction

(originally published in Lawren Harris, Bess Harris and R. G. P. Colgrove, editors, 1969)

- Conclusion to a Literary History of Canada

(originally published in Literary History of Canada, Carl F. Klinck general editor, 1965)
