= Garrison mentality =

Canadian literary theme

The theory of garrison mentality argues that early Canadian identity was characterised by fear of an empty and hostile national landscape. It suggests that the environment's impact on the national psyche has influenced themes within Canadian literature, cinema and television. The term was coined by literary critic Northrop Frye in the Literary History of Canada (1965), who used the metaphorical image of a garrison to illustrate that Canadians are defensive and hiding from external forces. It was then expanded upon by various other critics, including authors and academics. The garrison mentality is apparent in both older and more contemporary Canadian literature and media. The theory has received criticism and praise for its overarching premise that the natural environment has determined the qualities of a population.

== Overview and characteristics ==
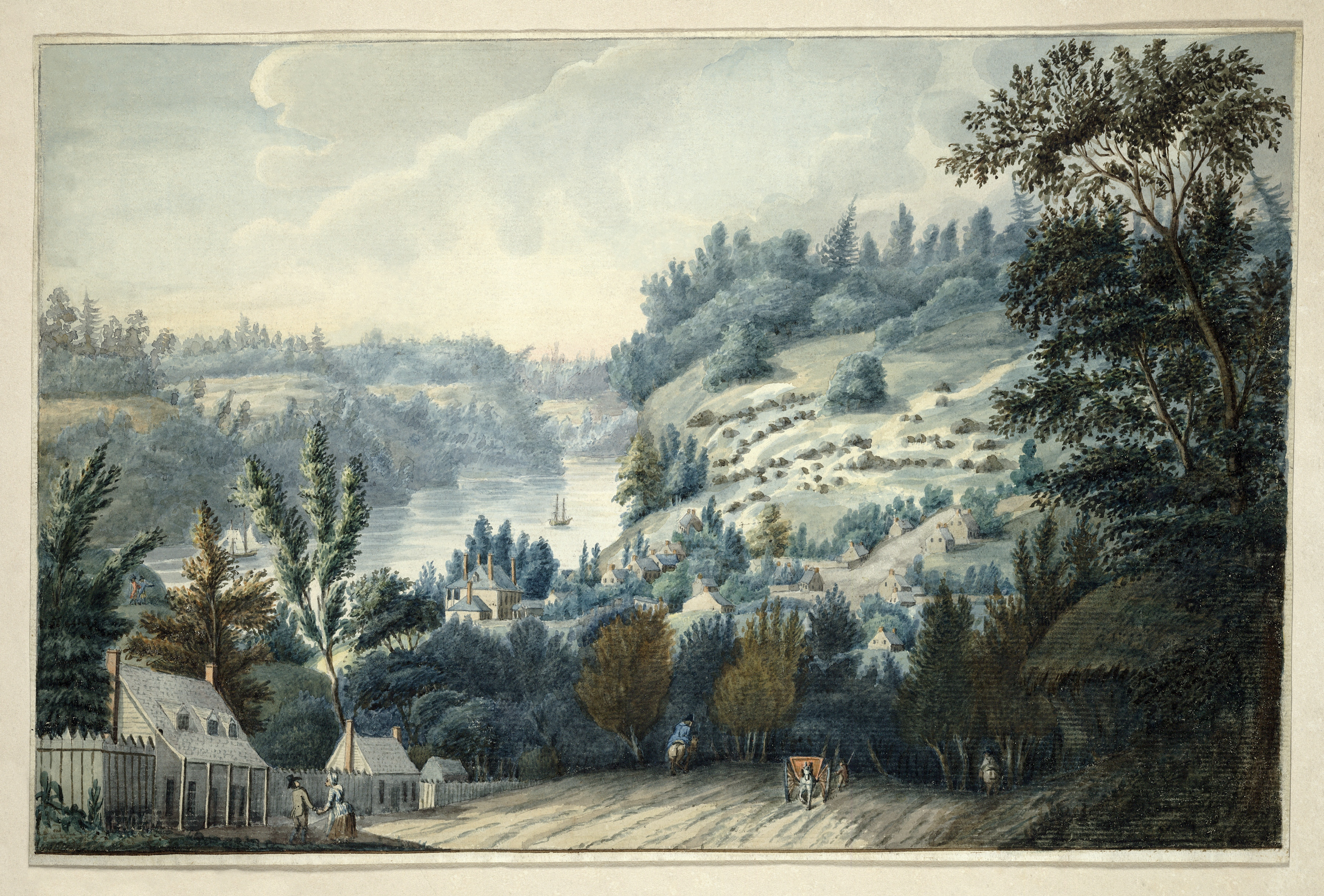
Painting by Edward Walsh from 1803 to 1807, depicting the upper Canadian wilderness closing off a small village from the rest of society.

The garrison mentality posits that unaccommodating external environments in Canada, whether they be physical or political, have influenced the psyche of its inhabitants to make them introspective and defensive. For example, the unknown wilderness and cold emptiness of Canada's landscape during settlement is suggested to have caused such qualities, as isolating oneself from a dangerous environment is safer than attempting to tame it.

The garrison mentality is suggested to entail various characteristics, such as:

- Feeling exiled from one's own identity and the land they live on
- Feeling inferior and oppressed by other nations, especially America
- Feeling a sense of physical, mental, social, linguistic, and cultural isolation
- Feeling overwhelmed concerning hostile political and physical landscapes
- A tendency to revere law and order, as they act as protective institutions from nature and hostile societies
- A tendency to invent more difficulties for oneself than necessary
- A tendency to antagonise empty or wild landscapes.

This garrison mentality typically manifests in characters of literature and media, who exhibit any of the above characteristics. Such characters may also be influenced by their environments to a great degree. Their personalities and behaviours may be moulded by the world they inhabit. Authors and artists themselves can also use these characteristics as thematic concerns for their work.

== Development ==
The garrison mentality was first coined by literary critic Northrop Frye in his 'Conclusion' to the Literary History of Canada (1965). He suggested that this aspect of Canadian identity was formed through the population's history and experience with vast wilderness, early settlement and growth in multiculturalism. Frye stated that travellers and merchants who resided in early Canada developed these social traits because they lived in garrisons, or isolated military communities. He also claimed that this national identity of cowardly protectionism has stunted the growth of Canadian literature.

The theory was later expanded upon by poet D. G. Jones in the book Butterfly on Rock (1970), arguing that the garrison mentality's defensive stance against nature has shifted into a more amicable relationship since colonisation. Jones also expanded upon Frye's metaphor by considering the theory from a biblical perspective, asserting that significant Canadian writers have the salvational task to break down the garrison mentality. He believes that such authors are responsible for letting nature back into not only their own lives, but the lives of their audiences.

Author Margaret Atwood in Survival: A Thematic Guide to Canadian Literature (1972) also added to the development of this theory by suggesting that the Canadian insecurity surrounding survival was also a product of cultural domination from the US, not just the physical landscape. These ideas were also corroborated by articles, such as from The New York Times, which implicitly acknowledged and signalled a change from Atwood's model of the garrison mentality by stating: "After decades of meekly accepting cultural domination by Americans, the people of Canada are suddenly moving on several fronts to protect and revitalize their national culture." She also theorised that characters were very commonly in positions of 'victimhood' within Canadian texts. Atwood agreed with Frye's evaluation that Canadian literature lacked growth and grounding, finding that this level of preoccupation with survival was unique to Canadian texts.

== Examples in literature ==
- Surfacing (1972) by Margaret Atwood is set in a Quebec forest, where characters often disappear after entering “the bush”. The narrator also sees herself as a victim of an Americanized modern civilization, as she has been exploited by people she perceives as US citizens. She is politically dispossessed and feels disconnected from society itself, comparing people to animals that cannot be related to.
- In The Skin of a Lion (1987) by Michael Ondaatje features protagonist Patrick Lewis confronted by Canada's wilderness. Ondaatje depicts “axes banging into the cold wood as if into metal,” emphasising the country's untameable coldness that impedes Patrick's work as a lumberjack. In addition to being physically overwhelmed, Ondaatje shows Patrick feeling displaced culturally and linguistically as the character moves into the urbanising city of Toronto: “Now, in the city, he was new even to himself, the past locked away.”
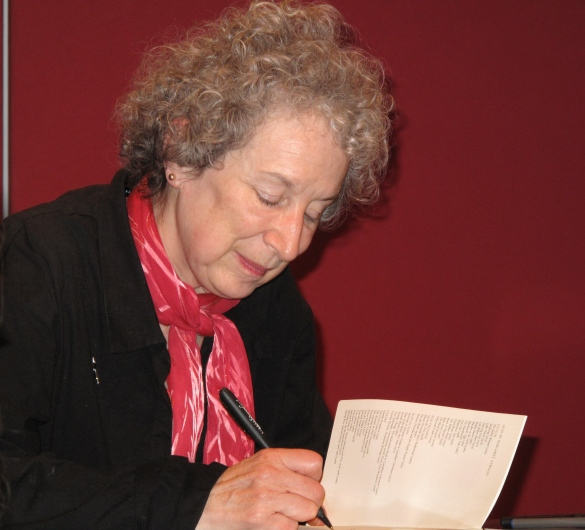
  Canadian author Margaret Atwood in 2009, who both contributed to the development of the garrison mentality and exhibited it in her own literature.

== Examples in media ==
- The animated sci-fi TV series ReBoot (1994) features protagonist Bob defending Mainframe city from evil computer viruses. Citizens of Mainframe are in constant threat from external forces, and are always acting on the defensive, not the offensive. This ever-looming danger changes every episode, thus always being present but never fully defined, like the ambiguous threats of wilderness that the garrison mentality theory suggests.
- Ginger Snaps Back: The Beginning (2004) is a horror film that explicitly explores the garrison mentality by using the experiences of Canadian settlers as a foundation for horror. The main group of characters are isolated and threatened by unknown threats looming in forests.
- Pontypool (2008) is a zombie film where the Canadian environment contributes to the horror. Whilst most movies in the zombie horror genre incite feelings of claustrophobia as the undead barricade people into isolated buildings, the protagonists of Pontypool are trapped by the cold Canadian winter. Characters tell each other that: “These late winters I feel like I’m in the basement of the world. It’s so cold and so dark”. Such remarks echo the garrison mentality, and the sense of unease regarding physical environment and cultural identity.
- Sitcom TV series Schitt's Creek (2015) features the once wealthy Rose family being displaced in rural Canada, finding difficulty in this new confronting environment. Having to continue living in rural Ontario influences the main cast of characters over the course of the show's six seasons, changing their personality traits and behaviours. Canadian Geographic journalist Stephen Marche stated that: “These are not shows about the love of place, but about what places do to you: how they make you talk, how they make you dress, how they make you act, how they make you love.”

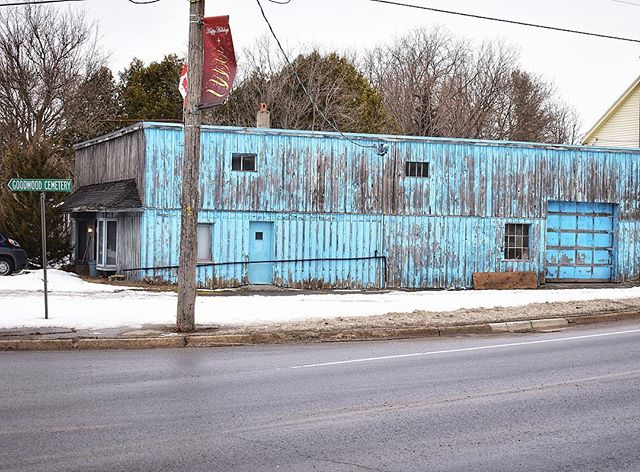
A worn down garage from Schitt's Creek. Its unappealing design reflects the garrison mentality, as characters are forced to spend time in and around this environment.

== Criticism and praise ==
=== Criticism ===
One major critique of Frye and Atwood's presentation of the garrison mentality is that the theory's scope seems heavily Eurocentric. Professor William Beard from the University of Alberta has stated that “the Frye-Atwood model [of the garrison mentality is viewed] with contempt if not outright hostility” in film studies. This criticism contends that the theory is confined “to an Anglo-colonial way of thinking that puts white British conquerors in charge of everything, so blind to the regionalism and multiculturalism of the refigured national conversation”. Because it centralises the experience of colonists trying to manage and navigate a foreign land, the theory has been labelled as biased to Western civilizations.

Another criticism levelled against the theory is for its foundational assumption that the environment will influence authors and artists. Literary academic Eli Mandel has argued that Frye's claim of natural land determining qualities in literature is false. Mandel conversely presented the idea that authors ‘invent’ the land themselves, using their writing to represent the Canadian landscape. This critique thus attempts to undermine the theory as a whole, as the assumption that one's environment can influence their qualities is a central tenet of the garrison mentality.

It has also been critiqued for being reductive, and has been accused of simplifying complex characteristics of Canadian culture and identity. Academic Sherrie Malisch suggested that the garrison mentality is used too freely as a "shorthand for deficiencies in the Canadian national spirit... [it] appears in everything from a political rant against 'Laurentian elites' to an institutional critique of the CBC". This critique represents the garrison mentality as a popular buzzword in Canadian discourse, and calls for a refocusing of what the term was originally referring to.

Additionally, the theory has been overlooked on the grounds of being too narrow-minded, ultimately not accounting for the vast amount of creative material that Canadian writers produce. This has been argued by Canadian authors such as J. M. Frey, who wrote that the Frye-Atwood model is "hardly representative of what all of us are writing".

=== Praise ===
Despite criticism, the longevity of Frye's original theory has given it "the power of a biblical authority", as academic Helen M. Buss wrote. Thus, the garrison mentality has attained a privileged status of credibility because of how influential it was and still is in Canadian cultural discourse.

Similarly, it has received praise for how inextricably connected it has become with the study and consideration of Canadian culture. Canadian literary critic David Staines stated that the term 'garrison mentality' has become “part of our [the Canadian people's] critical vocabulary, indeed of our very language”. By emphasising how integrated the terminology has become with Canadian vernacular, Staines esteems the concept and its accessibility.

The theory has also been heralded for its ongoing relevance to human nature and the environment, especially in regards to climate change. When viewed from the perspective of contemporary eco-criticism, the thesis can be reinterpreted to suggest that fear and retreat from climate change is both prevalent and useful in the 21st century.

== See also ==
- Siege mentality
- Victim mentality
- Paranoia
- Paranoid fiction
- Learned helplessness
- Self-handicapping
- Self-perception theory
- Persecutory delusion

== Sources ==
- Atwood, Margaret. Survival: A Thematic Guide to Canadian Literature. Toronto: McClelland and Stewart, 1972.
- Frye, Northrop. "Conclusion to a Literary History of Canada." The Bush Garden: Essays on the Canadian Imagination. Toronto: Anansi, 1975.
