= Northrop Frye =

Canadian literary critic (1912–1991)

The Reverend Northrop Frye CC FRSC
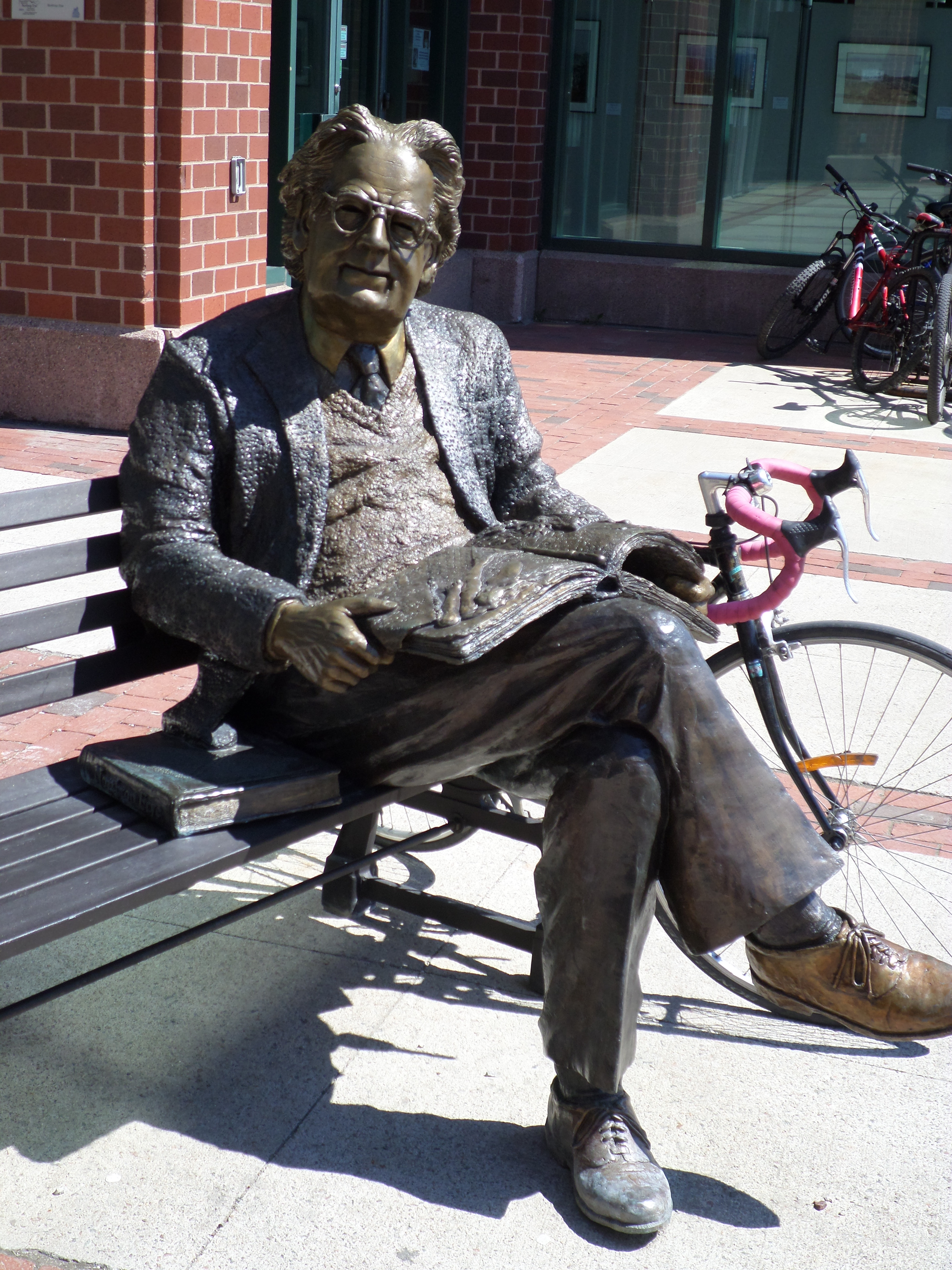
- A statue of Frye in Moncton, New Brunswick

10th Chancellor of Victoria University, Toronto
- In office 1978 – January 23, 1991
- President: Goldwin S. French; Eva Kushner
- Preceded by: Louis Orville Breithaupt
- Succeeded by: Sang Chul Lee

Principal of Victoria College, Toronto
- In office 1959 – 1967
- Preceded by: Harold Bennett
- Succeeded by: John Edwin Hodgetts

Personal details
- Born: Herman Northrop Frye; July 14, 1912 Sherbrooke, Quebec, Canada
- Died: January 23, 1991 (aged 78) Toronto, Ontario, Canada
- Spouses: Helen Kemp Frye (m. 1937; died 1986); Elizabeth Brown Frye (m. 1988)

Ecclesiastical career
- Religion: Christianity
- Church: United Church of Canada
- Ordained: 1936

Academic background
- Education: University of Toronto; Merton College, Oxford
- Influences: William Blake; F. R. Leavis; I. A. Richards; Oswald Spengler; Giambattista Vico

Academic work
- Discipline: English
- Sub-discipline: Literary criticism; literary theory
- School or tradition: Archetypal literary criticism; Romanticism; Toronto School of communication theory
- Institutions: Victoria College, Toronto
- Main interests: Imagination; archetype; myth; Bible
- Notable works: Anatomy of Criticism (1957)
- Notable ideas: Archetypes of literature; classless culture; garrison mentality
- Influenced: Margaret Atwood; Harold Bloom; Fredric Jameson; B. W. Powe

Herman Northrop Frye (July 14, 1912 – January 23, 1991) was a Canadian literary critic and literary theorist, considered one of the most influential of the 20th century.

Frye gained international fame with his first book, Fearful Symmetry (1947), which led to the reinterpretation of the poetry of William Blake. His lasting reputation rests principally on the theory of literary criticism that he developed in Anatomy of Criticism (1957), one of the most important works of literary theory published in the twentieth century. The American critic Harold Bloom commented at the time of its publication that Anatomy established Frye as "the foremost living student of Western literature." Frye's contributions to cultural and social criticism spanned a long career during which he earned widespread recognition and received many honours.

== Biography ==
=== Early life and education ===
Born in Sherbrooke, Quebec, but raised in Moncton, New Brunswick, Frye was the third child of Herman Edward Frye and of Catherine Maud Howard. His much older brother, Howard, died in World War I; he also had a sister, Vera. His first cousin was the scientist Alma Howard. Frye went to Toronto to compete in a national typing contest in 1929. He studied for his undergraduate degree in philosophy at Victoria College in the University of Toronto, where he edited the college literary journal, Acta Victoriana. He then studied theology at Emmanuel College (like Victoria College, a constituent part of the University of Toronto). After a brief stint as a student minister in Saskatchewan, he was ordained to the ministry of the United Church of Canada. He then studied at Merton College, Oxford, where he was a member and Secretary of the Bodley Club before returning to Victoria College, where he spent the remainder of his professional career.

=== Academic and writing career ===
Frye rose to international prominence as a result of his first book, Fearful Symmetry, published in 1947. Until then, the prophetic poetry of William Blake had long been poorly understood, and considered by some to be delusional ramblings. Frye found in it a system of metaphor derived from Paradise Lost and the Bible. His study of Blake's poetry was a major contribution to the subject. Moreover, Frye outlined an innovative manner of studying literature that was to deeply influence the study of literature in general. He was a major influence on Harold Bloom, Margaret Atwood, and others.

From 1959 to 1967, he was principal of Victoria College in the University of Toronto. In 1974–1975, Frye was the Norton professor at Harvard University. But his primary position was as a professor at the University of Toronto, and then chancellor of Victoria College from 1978 until his death.

Northrop Frye did not have a PhD.

The intelligence service of the Royal Canadian Mounted Police spied on Frye, watching his participation in the anti–Vietnam War movement, an academic forum about China, and activism to end South African apartheid.

=== Family life ===
Frye married Helen Kemp, an educator, editor and artist, in 1937. They met while at Victoria College in the University of Toronto, during a student production of The Gondoliers. They never had children. She died in Australia while accompanying Frye on a lecture tour. Two years after her death in 1986, he remarried to Elizabeth Eedy Brown, the widow of politician James Elisha Brown and the sister of writer Alice Boissonneau. He died in 1991 and was interred in Mount Pleasant Cemetery in Toronto, Ontario.

== Contribution to literary criticism ==
The insights gained from his study of Blake set Frye on his critical path and shaped his contributions to literary criticism and theory. He was the first critic to postulate a systematic theory of criticism, "to work out," in his own words, "a unified commentary on the theory of literary criticism" (Stubborn Structure 160). In so doing, he shaped the discipline of criticism. Inspired by his work on Blake, Frye developed and articulated his unified theory ten years after Fearful Symmetry, in the Anatomy of Criticism (1957). He described this as an attempt at a "synoptic view of the scope, theory, principles, and techniques of literary criticism" (Anatomy 3). He asked, "what if criticism is a science as well as an art?" (7), Thus, Frye launched the pursuit which was to occupy the rest of his career—that of establishing criticism as a "coherent field of study which trains the imagination quite as systematically and efficiently as the sciences train the reason" (Hamilton 34).

=== Criticism as a science ===
As A. C. Hamilton outlines in Northrop Frye: Anatomy of his Criticism, Frye's assumption of coherence for literary criticism carries important implications. Firstly and most fundamentally, it presupposes that literary criticism is a discipline in its own right, independent of literature. Claiming with John Stuart Mill that "the artist ... is not heard but overheard," Frye insists that

The axiom of criticism must be, not that the poet does not know what he is talking about, but that he cannot talk about what he knows. To defend the right of criticism to exist at all, therefore, is to assume that criticism is a structure of thought and knowledge existing in its own right, with some measure of independence from the art it deals with (Anatomy 5).

This "declaration of independence" (Hart xv) is necessarily a measured one for Frye. For coherence requires that the autonomy of criticism, the need to eradicate its conception as "a parasitic form of literary expression, ... a second-hand imitation of creative power" (Anatomy 3), sits in dynamic tension with the need to establish integrity for it as a discipline. For Frye, this kind of coherent, critical integrity involves claiming a body of knowledge for criticism that, while independent of literature, is yet constrained by it: "If criticism exists," he declares, "it must be an examination of literature in terms of a conceptual framework derivable from an inductive survey of the literary field" itself (Anatomy 7).

=== Frye's conceptual framework for literature ===
In seeking integrity for criticism, Frye rejects what he termed the deterministic fallacy. He defines this as the movement of "a scholar with a special interest in geography or economics [to] express ... that interest by the rhetorical device of putting his favorite study into a causal relationship with whatever interests him less" (Anatomy 6). By attaching criticism to an external framework rather than locating the framework for criticism within literature, this kind of critic essentially "substitute[s] a critical attitude for criticism." For Frye critical integrity means that "the axioms and postulates of criticism ... have to grow out of the art it deals with" (Anatomy 6).

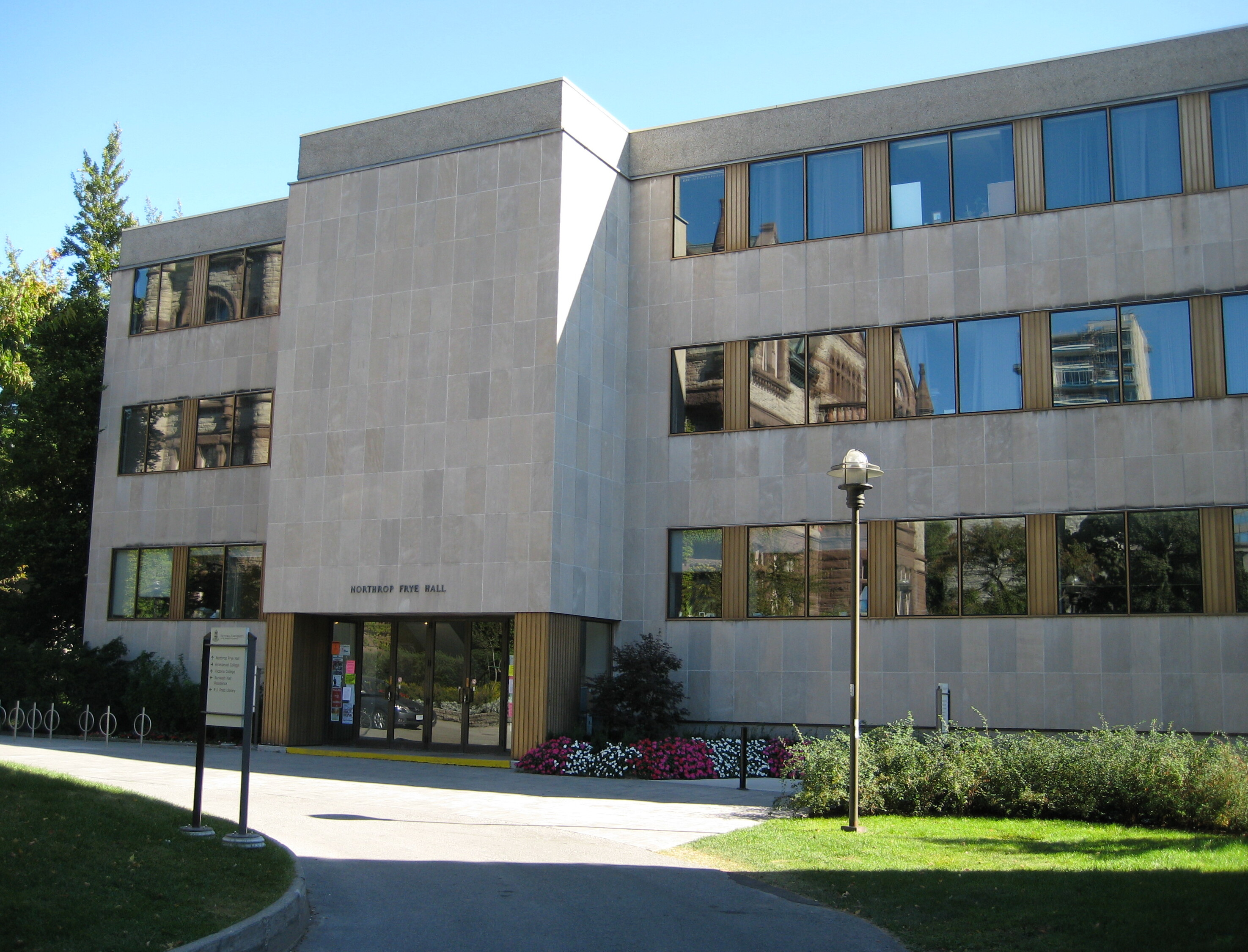
Northrop Frye Hall, University of Toronto

Taking his cue from Aristotle, Frye's methodology in defining a conceptual framework begins inductively, "follow[ing] the natural order and begin[ning] with the primary facts" (Anatomy 15). The primary facts, in this case, are the works of literature themselves. And what did Frye's inductive survey of these facts reveal? Significantly, they revealed "a general tendency on the part of great classics to revert to [primitive formulas]" (Anatomy 17). This revelation prompted his next move, or rather, 'inductive leap':

I suggest that it is time for criticism to leap to a new ground from which it can discover what the organizing or containing forms of its conceptual framework are. Criticism seems to be badly in need of a coordinating principle, a central hypothesis which, like the theory of evolution in biology, will see the phenomena it deals with as parts of a whole (Anatomy 16).

Arguing that "criticism cannot be a systematic [and thus scientific] study unless there is a quality in literature which enables it to be so," Frye puts forward the hypothesis that "just as there is an order of nature behind the natural sciences, so literature is not a piled aggregate of 'works,' but an order of words" (Anatomy 17). This order of words constitutes criticism's conceptual framework, its coordinating principle.

=== The order of words ===
The recurring primitive formulas Frye noticed in his survey of the "greatest classics" provide literature with an order of words, a "skeleton" which allows the reader "to respond imaginatively to any literary work by seeing it in the larger perspective provided by its literary and social contexts" (Hamilton 20). Frye identifies these formulas as the "conventional myths and metaphors" which he calls "archetypes" (Spiritus Mundi 118). The archetypes of literature exist, Frye argues, as an order of words, providing criticism with a conceptual framework and a body of knowledge derived not from an ideological system but rooted in the imagination itself. Thus, rather than interpreting literary works from some ideological 'position'—what Frye calls the "superimposed critical attitude" (Anatomy 7)—criticism instead finds integrity within the literary field itself.

Criticism for Frye, then, is not a task of evaluation—that is, of rejecting or accepting a literary work—but rather simply of recognizing it for what it is and understanding it in relation to other works within the 'order of words' (Cotrupi 4). Imposing value judgments on literature belongs, according to Frye, "only to the history of taste, and therefore follows the vacillations of fashionable prejudice" (Anatomy 9). Genuine criticism "progresses toward making the whole of literature intelligible" (Anatomy 9) so that its goal is ultimately knowledge and not evaluation. For the critic in Frye's mode, then,

... a literary work should be contemplated as a pattern of knowledge, an act that must be distinguished, at least initially, from any direct experience of the work, ... [Thus] criticism begins when reading ends: no longer imaginatively subjected to a literary work, the critic tries to make sense out of it, not by going to some historical context or by commenting on the immediate experience of reading but by seeing its structure within literature and literature within culture (Hamilton 27).

=== A theory of the imagination ===
Once asked whether his critical theory was Romantic, Frye responded, "Oh, it's entirely Romantic, yes" (Stingle 1). It is Romantic in the same sense that Frye attributed Romanticism to Blake: that is, "in the expanded sense of giving a primary place to imagination and individual feeling" (Stingle 2). As artifacts of the imagination, literary works, including "the pre-literary categories of ritual, myth, and folk-tale" (Archetypes 1450) form, in Frye's vision, a potentially unified imaginative experience. He reminds us that literature is the "central and most important extension" of mythology: "... every human society possesses a mythology which is inherited, transmitted and diversified by literature" (Words with Power xiii). Mythology and literature thus inhabit and function within the same imaginative world, one that is "governed by conventions, by its own modes, symbols, myths and genres" (Hart 23). Integrity for criticism requires that it too operates within the sphere of the imagination, and not seek an organizing principle in ideology. To do so, claims Frye,

... leaves out the central structural principles that literature derives from myth, the principles that give literature its communicating power across the centuries through all ideological changes. Such structural principles are certainly conditioned by social and historical factors and do not transcend them, but they retain a continuity of form that points to an identity of the literary organism distinct from all its adaptations to its social environment (Words with Power xiii).

Myth therefore provides structure to literature simply because literature as a whole is "displaced mythology" (Bates 21). Hart makes the point well when he states that "For Frye, the story, and not the argument, is at the centre of literature and society. The base of society is mythical and narrative and not ideological and dialectical" (19). This idea, which is central in Frye's criticism, was first suggested to him by Giambattista Vico.

=== Frye's critical method ===
Frye uses the terms 'centripetal' and 'centrifugal' to describe his critical method. Criticism, Frye explains, is essentially centripetal when it moves inwardly, towards the structure of a text; it is centrifugal when it moves outwardly, away from the text and towards society and the outer world. Lyric poetry, for instance, like Keats's "Ode on a Grecian Urn", is predominantly centripetal, stressing the sound and movement and imagery of the ordered words. Rhetorical novels, like Uncle Tom's Cabin, are predominantly centrifugal, stressing the thematic connection of the stories and characters to the social order. The "Ode" has centrifugal tendencies, relying for its effects on elements of history and pottery and visual aesthetics. Cabin has centripetal tendencies, relying on syntax and lexical choice to delineate characters and establish mood. But the one veers inward, the other pushes outward. Criticism reflects these movements, centripetally focusing on the aesthetic function of literature, centrifugally on the social function of literature.

While some critics or schools of criticism emphasize one movement over the other, for Frye, both movements are essential: "criticism will always have two aspects, one turned toward the structure of literature and one turned toward the other cultural phenomena that form the social environment of literature" (Critical Path 25). He would therefore agree, at least in part, with the New Critics of his day in their centripetal insistence on structural analysis. But for Frye this is only part of the story: "It is right," he declares, "that the first effort of critical apprehension should take the form of a rhetorical or structural analysis of a work of art. But a purely structural approach has the same limitation in criticism that it has in biology." That is, it doesn't develop "any explanation of how the structure came to be what it was and what its nearest relatives are. Structural analysis brings rhetoric back to criticism, but we need a new poetics as well ..." (Archetypes 1447).

=== Archetypal criticism as "a new poetics" ===
For Frye, this "new poetics" is to be found in the principle of the mythological framework, which has come to be known as 'archetypal criticism'. It is through the lens of this framework, which is essentially a centrifugal movement of backing up from the text towards the archetype, that the social function of literary criticism becomes apparent. Essentially, "what criticism can do," according to Frye, "is awaken students to successive levels of awareness of the mythology that lies behind the ideology in which their society indoctrinates them" (Stingle 5). That is, the study of recurring structural patterns grants students an emancipatory distance from their own society, and gives them a vision of a higher human state—the Longinian sublime—that is not accessible directly through their own experience, but ultimately transforms and expands their experience, so that the poetic model becomes a model to live by. In what he terms a "kerygmatic mode," myths become "myths to live by" and metaphors "metaphors to live in," which " ... not only work for us but constantly expand our horizons, [so that] we may enter the world of [kerygma or transformative power] and pass on to others what we have found to be true for ourselves" (Double Vision 18).

Because of its important social function, Frye felt that literary criticism was an essential part of a liberal education, and worked tirelessly to communicate his ideas to a wider audience. "For many years now," he wrote in 1987, "I have been addressing myself primarily, not to other critics, but to students and a nonspecialist public, realizing that whatever new directions can come to my discipline will come from their needs and their intense if unfocused vision" (Auguries 7). It is therefore fitting that his last book, published posthumously, should be one that he describes as being "something of a shorter and more accessible version of the longer books, The Great Code and Words with Power," which he asks his readers to read sympathetically, not "as proceeding from a judgment seat of final conviction, but from a rest stop on a pilgrimage, however near the pilgrimage may now be to its close" (Double Vision Preface).

=== Influences: Vico and Blake ===
Vico, in The New Science, posited a view of language as fundamentally figurative, and introduced into Enlightenment discourse the notion of the role of the imagination in creating meaning. For Vico, poetic discourse is prior to philosophical discourse; philosophy is in fact derivative of poetry. Frye readily acknowledged the debt he owed to Vico in developing his literary theory, describing him as "the first modern thinker to understand that all major verbal structures have descended historically from poetic and mythological ones" (Words with Power xii).

However, it was Blake, Frye's "Virgilian guide" (Stingle 1), who first awakened Frye to the "mythological frame of our culture" (Cotrupi 14). In fact, Frye claims that his "second book [Anatomy] was contained in embryo in the first [Fearful Symmetry]" (Stubborn Structure 160). For it was in reflecting on the similarity between Blake and Milton that Frye first stumbled upon the "principle of the mythological framework," the recognition that "the Bible was a mythological framework, cosmos or body of stories, and that societies live within a mythology" (Hart 18). Blake thus led Frye to the conviction that the Bible provided Western societies with the mythology which informed all of Western literature. As Hamilton asserts, "Blake's claim that 'the Old and New Testaments are the Great Code of Art' became the central doctrine of all [Frye's] criticism" (39). This 'doctrine' found its fullest expression in Frye's appropriately named The Great Code, which he described as "a preliminary investigation of Biblical structure and typology" whose purpose was ultimately to suggest "how the structure of the Bible, as revealed by its narrative and imagery, was related to the conventions and genres of Western literature" (Words with Power xi). Frye, in The Great Code states that I soon realized that a student of English literature who does not know the Bible does not understand a good deal of what is going on in what he reads: The most conscientous student will be continually misconstruing the implications, even the meaning. (p. xii).

=== Contribution to the theorizing of Canada ===
During the 1950s, Frye wrote annual surveys of Canadian poetry for the University of Toronto Quarterly, which led him to observe recurrent themes and preoccupations in Canadian poetry. Subsequently, Frye elaborated on these observations, especially in his conclusion to Carl F. Klinck's Literary History of Canada (1965). In this work, Frye presented the idea of the "garrison mentality" as the attitude from which Canadian literature has been written. The garrison mentality is the attitude of a member of a community that feels isolated from cultural centres and besieged by a hostile landscape. Frye maintained that such communities were peculiarly Canadian, and fostered a literature that was formally immature, that displayed deep moral discomfort with "uncivilized" nature, and whose narratives reinforced social norms and values.

Frye also aided James Polk in compiling Divisions on a Ground: Essays on Canadian Culture (1982). In the posthumous Collected Works of Northrop Frye, his writings on Canada occupy the thick 12th volume.

Garrison mentality

Frye collected his disparate writings on Canadian writing and painting in The Bush Garden: Essays on the Canadian Imagination (1971). He coined phrases like the Garrison Mentality, a theme that summarizes Canadian literature. Margaret Atwood adopted his approach and elaborated on this in her book Survival (1972).

Canadian identity in literature

Based on his observations of Canadian literature, Frye concluded that, by extension, Canadian identity was defined by a fear of nature, by the history of settlement and by unquestioned adherence to the community. However, Frye perceived the ability and advisability of Canadian (literary) identity to move beyond these characteristics. Frye proposed the possibility of movement beyond the literary constraints of the garrison mentality: growing urbanization, interpreted as greater control over the environment, would produce a society with sufficient confidence for its writers to compose more formally advanced detached literature.

==== Study of literary productions ====
Frye's international reputation allowed him to champion Canadian literature at a time when to do so was considered provincial. Frye argued that regardless of the formal quality of the writing, it was imperative to study Canadian literary productions in order to understand the Canadian imagination and its reaction to the Canadian environment.

== Awards and honours ==
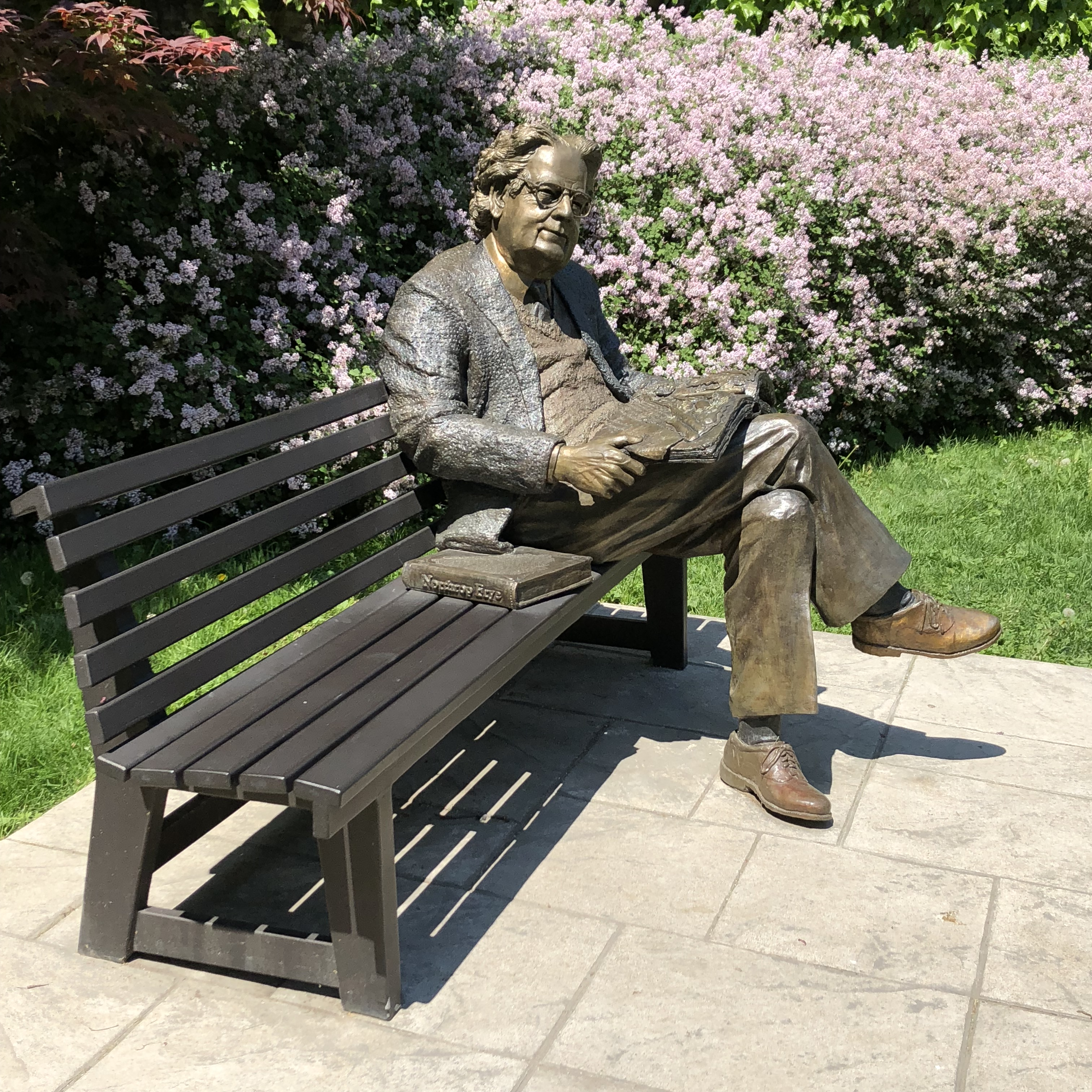
A statue of Northrop Frye on the campus of Victoria University in the University of Toronto

Frye was elected to the Royal Society of Canada in 1951 and awarded the Royal Society's Lorne Pierce Medal (1958) and its Pierre Chauveau Medal (1970). He was named University Professor by the University of Toronto in 1967. He won the Canada Council Molson Prize in 1971, and the Royal Bank Award in 1978. In 1987 he received the Governor General's Literary Award and the Toronto Arts Lifetime Achievement Award. He was an Honorary Fellow or Member of the following:

- American Academy of Arts and Sciences (1969)
- Merton College, Oxford (1974)
- British Academy (1975)
- American Philosophical Society (1976), and
- American Academy and Institute of Arts and Letters (1981).

Northrop Frye was made a Companion of the Order of Canada in 1972. In 2000, he was honoured by the government of Canada with his image on a postage stamp. An international literary festival The Frye Festival, named in Frye's honour, takes place every April in Moncton, New Brunswick.

The Northrop Frye Centre, part of Victoria College at the University of Toronto, was named in his honour, as was the Humanities Stream of the Vic One Program at Victoria College and the Northrop Frye Centre for Comparative Literature at the University of Toronto.

Northrop Frye School in Moncton was named in his honour. A statue shows Frye sitting on a park bench outside the entrance to the Moncton Public Library. Another casting of the statue and bench by artists Darren Byers and Fred Harrison sits at Victoria College at the University of Toronto.

Frye was named a National Historic Person in 2018.

== Works by Northrop Frye ==
The following is a list of his books, including the volumes in the Collected Works of Northrop Frye, an ongoing project under the editorship of Alvin A. Lee.

- Fearful Symmetry: A Study of William Blake
- Anatomy of Criticism
- The Educated Imagination
- Fables of Identity
- T. S. Eliot
- The Well-Tempered Critic
- A Natural Perspective: The Development of Shakespearean Comedy and Romance
- The Return of Eden: Five Essays on Milton's Epics
- Fools of Time: Studies in Shakespearean Tragedy
- The Modern Century
- A Study of English Romanticism
- The Stubborn Structure: Essays on Criticism and Society
- The Bush Garden: Essays on the Canadian Imagination
- The Critical Path: An Essay on the Social Context of Literary Criticism
- The Secular Scripture: A Study of the Structure of Romance
- Spiritus Mundi: Essays on Literature, Myth, and Society
- Northrop Frye on Culture and Literature: A Collection of Review Essays
- Creation and Recreation
- The Great Code: The Bible and Literature
- Divisions on a Ground: Essays on Canadian Culture
- The Myth of Deliverance: Reflections on Shakespeare's Problem Comedies
- Harper Handbook to Literature (with Sheridan Baker and George W. Perkins)
- On Education
- No Uncertain Sounds
- Myth and Metaphor: Selected Essays
- Words with Power: Being a Second Study of The Bible and Literature
- Reading the World: Selected Writings
- The Double Vision of Language, Nature, Time, and God
- A World in a Grain of Sand: Twenty-Two Interviews with Northrop Frye
- Reflections on the Canadian Literary Imagination: A Selection of Essays by Northrop Frye
- Mythologizing Canada: Essays on the Canadian Literary Imagination
- Northrop Frye on Shakespeare
- Northrop Frye in Conversation (an interview with David Cayley)
- The Eternal Act of Creation
- Collected Works of Northrop Frye
- Northrop Frye on Religion

Beyond these publications, Frye edited fifteen books, composed essays and chapters that appear in over sixty books, and wrote over one hundred articles and reviews in academic journals. From 1950 to 1960 he wrote the annual critical and bibliographical survey of Canadian poetry for Letters in Canada, University of Toronto Quarterly.

== Sources ==
- Hart, Jonathan (2005). Northrop Frye: The Theoretical Imagination. Critics of the Twentieth Century. London: Routledge. ISBN 978-1-13490437-2.
