= Catherine Murphy (filmmaker) =

American film director

Catherine Murphy is a U.S. filmmaker, activist and educator, best known for her documentary film MAESTRA about the 1961 Cuban Literacy Campaign. Her work principally focuses on art, education and social justice in the Americas. Murphy founded The Literacy Project in 2004, Tres Musas Producciones in 2009, and Maestra Productions in 2022.

== Early life ==
Murphy was raised on the campus of Stanford University, where her parents were students. Growing up, she was influenced by her grandmother and great-aunt, both of whom lived in Cuba at the turn of the 20th century.

== Time in Cuba ==
Murphy studied in Havana during the 1990s in what is known as Cuba's Special Period. While living in Havana, Murphy earned a master's degree in sociology from the Facultad Latinoamericana de Ciencias Sociales. An early version of her thesis was published by the Institute for Food and Development Policy in 1999, under the title “Cultivating Havana: Urban agriculture and food security in the years of crisis”. Based on this work, she gave one of the 2010 keynote speeches to the Northeast Organic Farming Association.

== Teaching ==
Murphy was an adjunct professor at New York University's Center for Global Affairs, from 2014 - 2016 where she developed a graduate course on the culture and history of Havana.

== The Literacy Project ==
Murphy founded The Literacy Project in 2004 to explore issues of literacy and illiteracy in the Americas, inspired by meeting women who volunteered on the Cuban Literacy Campaign. In 1961, Cuba aimed to eradicate illiteracy across the island in the space of one year. Over 250,000 volunteers traveled across the island to teach reading and writing in rural communities. 100,000 of the volunteers were under 18 and more than half of them were women.

In 2003, after completing academic studies in Havana, Murphy recorded the first three interviews with former Literacy Campaign volunteers Norma Guillard, Daysi Veitia and Gina Rey. From 2004 to 2010, she continued to research and record stories of Literacy Campaign volunteers and the rural families that hosted them, eventually producing and directing the documentary MAESTRA and founding The Literacy Project.

The Literacy Project collects oral histories and uses a variety of media and documentation methodologies to capture the history of adult literacy work throughout the Americas, and, as the non-profit wing, is an integral part of Maestra Productions.

== Maestra Productions ==
In 2022 Murphy founded Maestra Productions as homage to the women educators who inspired her first documentary MAESTRA. Maestra Productions is a collaborative international production house creating documentaries on art, education, and social justice movements.

== Filmography ==
Catherine Murphy has earned the following credits for her film work:

=== MAESTRA ===
Director/Producer, MAESTRA ("Teacher"). Documentary. US/Cuba. 2012.

MAESTRA is distributed by Women Make Movies and streams free on Kanopy with most public library cards. It has been translated into six languages and included in recommended curriculum resources and college publications, including the Zinn Education Project, Vanderbilt University and The University of Chicago

MAESTRA at the 2013 International Documentary Festival “OXDOX”

- Director, Reading the World Documentary. Brazil. 2025. Winner of Documentary prize at Gramado Film Festival 2025.
- Director, Maestras Voluntarias. Documentary. US/Cuba. 2022.
- Director, Fonemas de Liberdade. Documentary. US/Brazil. 2021.
- Director, Silvio Rodriguez: My First Calling. Documentary. US/Cuba. 2020.
- Co-Producer, They Say I'm Your Teacher. Documentary short. USA. 2019.
- Executive Producer, To Be A Miss. Documentary. Dir Flor Salcedo. Venezuela/USA. 2016.
- Associate Producer, From Ghost Town to Havana. Documentary. Dir Eugene Corr, 2013.
- Associate Producer, Will the Real Terrorist Please Stand Up? Documentary. Dir: Saul Landau. USA. 2011.
- Archive Researcher, Sing Your Song: The Life of Harry Belafonte. Dir Susane Rostock. USA. 2010.
- Subtitle Editor, Stealing America: Vote By Vote. Documentary. Dir Dorothy Fadiman. 2008.
- Subtitle Editor, The Greening of Cuba. Dir Jaime Kibben. USA. 1997
- Production Assistant, Gay Cuba. Documentary. Dir Sonja de Vries. USA. 1994
