= The Labrador Fiasco =

Book by Margaret Atwood

- First edition
- Author: Margaret Atwood
- Cover artist: Charles Pachter
- Language: English
- Publisher: Bloomsbury
- Publication date: 1996
- Publication place: Canada
- Media type: Print (Paperback)
- Pages: 64
- ISBN: 0-7475-2889-6
- OCLC: 978-0747528890

The Labrador Fiasco is a book by Canadian author Margaret Atwood. Published in 1996, it incorporates two of Atwood's longstanding interests of Canadian history and the Canadian wilderness. The "Labrador" in the title refers to the region in Canada. The story contains two stories, one within another. The story also fails to reveal the names of the narrator or other main characters, thus making them mysterious to readers.
