= The Robber Bride =

1993 novel by Margaret Atwood

- First edition
- Author: Margaret Atwood
- Cover artist: Malcolm Tarlofsky
- Language: English
- Publisher: McClelland and Stewart
- Publication date: September 1993
- Publication place: Canada
- Media type: Print (Hardcover, Paperback)
- Pages: 546 (first edition, hardcover), 528 pp (Paperback Ed.)
- ISBN: 0-7710-0821-X (first edition, hardcover), ISBN 0-385-49103-4
- OCLC: 28501016
- Preceded by: Good Bones
- Followed by: Alias Grace

The Robber Bride is a novel by Canadian writer Margaret Atwood, first published by McClelland and Stewart in 1993.

== Plot summary ==
In Toronto in October of 1990, three middle-aged friends, Tony, Charis, and Roz, are horrified when they learn that Zenia, a former friend who personally betrayed each of them and whom they believed to have died five years earlier, faked her death and has reappeared in their lives. Their stories are told in a series of flashbacks.

Tony is the first to meet Zenia. As an undergraduate in the 1960s, she lives in a women’s residence where she first meets Roz and Charis, though they are not initially close. She befriends a music student named West and subsequently Zenia, his girlfriend, who exploits Tony financially. Zenia convinces Tony to commit plagiarism and subsequently blackmails her for a large amount before disappearing, leaving West heartbroken. On Roz’s advice, Tony begins a relationship with him, and they eventually marry. Years later, Zenia knocks on their door, claiming to need help from West. He leaves Tony to live with her; when Zenia vanishes again, he goes back to Tony, who still loves him but no longer trusts him implicitly.

Zenia next appears in 1970, in a yoga class taught by Charis, who has lost contact with Tony and Roz. Zenia tells Charis that she is fleeing an abusive West and is dying of cancer, and Charis takes her into her home to care for her. The other woman’s presence causes friction with Charis’s partner Billy, an American draft dodger whom Charis is sheltering and by whom she becomes pregnant. After months, the tension peaks when Billy tells Charis he has seen that Zenia has no surgical scars, despite her claiming to have had a hysterectomy; the same day, Charis sees him and Zenia, accompanied by two official-looking men, departing on the Toronto Islands ferry. Desperate to find them, Charis calls West and so reconnects with Tony. Tony and Roz support Charis through her pregnancy, though they are unable to locate Billy.

In 1983, Zenia has a chance encounter with Roz and persuades her that she is now a respected freelance journalist. Zenia presents a remorseful face for her past treatment of Tony and Charis, and Roz hires her to work on a feminist magazine whose board Roz is on. Roz’s husband Mitch initially dislikes Zenia but begins a sexual relationship with her and, unlike in his past affairs, moves into an apartment with her. Zenia then absconds with fifty thousand dollars from the magazine’s accounts and abandons Mitch, leaving him devastated. After Roz refuses to take him back, he dies in a self-inflicted boating accident.

In the narrative present, all three women track Zenia down and demand answers; she gives each of them a different reason for faking her death and returning to Toronto, and attempts to reinsert herself into their lives. When Tony, Charis, and Roz meet to discuss their encounters with her, Charis has a premonition. They return to Zenia’s hotel, where they discover her corpse. The subsequent police investigation is inconclusive.

As no one else comes forward, the three women reluctantly take responsibility for arranging Zenia’s funeral and scatter her ashes in Lake Ontario. In the last line of the book, Tony thinks, “Was she in any way like us?...Or, to put it the other way around: Are we in any way like her?”

== Characters ==
Tony: Antonia Fremont, or Tony, has an intellectual and pragmatic personality, though she has a highly imaginative inner life. She works as a professor of history at the University of Toronto, with war as her area of specialty. The daughter of an English war bride and a Canadian serviceman, she was abandoned by her mother at ten years old, and her father died by suicide after her high school graduation. Tony is left-handed and has a propensity for writing words backwards; in this way, she gives herself an alter ego, Ynot Tnomerf, whom she imagines as a barbarian chief in contrast to her own short, slight figure. She has no children and has been romantically involved with only one man in her life, her husband West.

Charis: Charis, who does not have a surname given in the novel, is profoundly spiritual and idealistic to the point of naivete. Born under the name Karen, she was raised by a single mother who claimed to be a war widow; she spent a formative summer with her eccentric grandmother, from whom she learned much of her spirituality. When her mother was institutionalized, Karen was sent to live with her aunt and sexually abusive uncle. After dropping out of university, she changed her name to Charis and adopted a bohemian lifestyle, eventually falling in with a group of anti-war activists. In the narrative present of the novel, she lives on the Toronto Islands and works at a New Age shop. Charis has one child, a nineteen-year-old daughter named Augusta. After Augusta’s father Billy leaves, she abandons her free-love beliefs and avoids sex.

Roz: Rosalind Andrews (nee Greenwood or Grunwald) is outspoken, worldly, and maternal, though insecure about her physical appearance. She spent the first years of her childhood in her Catholic mother’s boarding house; in her early teens, her Jewish father returned from Europe, having made his fortune smuggling people and property out of Nazi Germany. Roz began her career as a successful venture capitalist working in her father’s business and supports feminist causes. She is devoted to and protective of her three children, the twenty-two-year-old Larry and the fifteen-year-old twins Erin and Paula. Prior to their separation and his death, she was deeply in love with her husband Mitch and routinely forgave him for his chronic adultery.

Zenia: Zenia, whose surname is also not given, is a beautiful and manipulative woman of roughly the same age as the other three; almost nothing else is known of her, and possibly Zenia is not her real name. She provides a different account of her origins and motivations to each of the other women, tailored to most appeal to their sympathies, interests, and fears. To Tony, the historian with a macabre interest in war, she says her aristocratic family were dispossessed by the Russian Revolution and she was a child prostitute; to the romantic and bohemian Charis, she claims her mother was a Roma woman stoned to death by ignorant villagers; she tells Roz that she was a Jewish child smuggled out of Germany with assistance from Roz’s adored father. When she returns in 1990, she tells Tony she has information about the Supergun affair, Charis that she has AIDS, and Roz that she is buying drugs from Roz’s son Larry, all of which proves to be false. She also tells Tony that she faked her death in Lebanon to conceal her black market arms trading, Charis that Billy left because he became an informant for the FBI, and Roz that Mitch tried to kill her when she attempted to leave him, which cannot be verified, though all of the women believe she is lying. After her death, she is found to have been involved in dealing heroin and to have overdosed on it before falling from her hotel balcony, leaving it unclear whether her death was an accident, a suicide, or a homicide.

== Themes ==
The novel, like many other works by Atwood, deals with power struggles between men and women, while also being a meditation on the nature of female friendship, power and trust. Zenia's character can be read as either the ultimate self-empowered woman—a traitor who abuses sisterhood—or a self-interested mercenary who cunningly uses the "war between the sexes" to further her interests. One interpretation posits Zenia as a kind of guardian angel to the women, saving them from unworthy men. This proposition comes as the conclusion of Atwood's later short story, "I Dream of Zenia with the Bright Red Teeth", which features the same characters.

Canadian literary critic Brian Busby wrote in his book Character Parts: Who's Really Who in Canlit that the character of Zenia was based on journalist Barbara Amiel.

== Awards ==
The novel was co-winner, with Jane Urquhart's Away, of the 1993 Trillium Book Award, and was shortlisted for the Governor General's Award for English-language fiction at the 1994 Governor General's Awards.

== Film adaptation ==
A film adaptation of The Robber Bride, starring Mary-Louise Parker as Zenia, Wendy Crewson as Roz, Greg Bryk as Henry, Shawn Doyle as John, Susan Lynch as Charis, Amanda Root as Tony, Tatiana Maslany as Augusta and Brandon Firla as West, aired on CBC Television in January 2007 and the Oxygen Network in March 2007.

The adaptation altered the plotline, choosing not to show Roz, Tony and Charis' childhood flashbacks and adding several new characters. In addition, Augusta is taken by Zenia and the Toxique has been changed to Absinthe.

== Sequel ==
In 2014, Atwood published the short story "I Dream of Zenia with the Bright Red Teeth", which revisits Roz, Tony and Charis in the present day, when Charis believes that her new pet dog Ouida is possessed by the spirit of Zenia. Originally published by the Canadian magazine The Walrus, the story also appears in her 2014 short story collection Stone Mattress.
