= Old Babes in the Wood =

2023 short story collection by Margaret Atwood

- First edition
- Author: Margaret Atwood
- Cover artist: Noma Bar
- Language: English
- Genre: Short story collection
- Publisher: McClelland and Stewart
- Publication date: 2023
- Publication place: Canada
- Media type: Print (hardcover)
- Pages: 257
- ISBN: 978-0-7710-0631-9
- OCLC: 1374501921
- Dewey Decimal: 813.54
- LC Class: 2022025775
- Preceded by: Burning Questions: Essays & Occasional Pieces 2004-2021
- Followed by: Paper Boat: New and Selected Poems: 1961-2023

Old Babes in the Woods is the ninth collection of short stories by Margaret Atwood, published March 7, 2023. The fifteen stories appear in three parts: three in "Tig & Nell", eight in "My Evil Mother" and four in "Nell & Tig."

The characters featured in the first and third parts, Tig and Nell, were also the focus of the author's 2006 collection Moral Disorder. The author considers these stories autofiction rather than memoir: "They're fairly close to some things that happened in our life. But of course, fiction involves limitation … You don't put everything in."

== Contents ==
- "First Aid"
- "Two Scorched Men"
- "Morte de Smudgie"
- "My Evil Mother"
- "The Dead Interview"
- "Impatient Griselda"
- "Bad Teeth"
- "Death by Clamshell"
- "Freeforall"
- "Metempsychosis: Or, The Journey of the Soul"
- "Airborne: A Symposium"
- "A Dusty Lunch"
- "Widows"
- "Wooden Box"
- "Old Babes in the Woods"

== Reception ==
Novelist Rebecca Makkai describes many of the stories as "wisdom from the advance guard" and their author as "our four-faced Janus, who’s got one face turned to the past, one to the present, one to the future and the fourth inside a spaceship, telling stories about eating horses" in The New York Times book review.

The Toronto Star reviewer, Steven W. Beattie, notes that the eight stories in the second part are preoccupied with how "we tell stories, the motivation behind this practice, and the ways stories get passed down among individuals, generations and entire cultures," and the "Tig and Nell stories rank with the best short fiction Atwood has produced."

"For a collection about aging, loss, and death, Old Babes in the Wood is remarkably buoyant," writes Priscilla Gilman in The Boston Globe: the collection "zings and zips with energy, crackles with wit, radiates dynamic intelligence and playful charisma."

Reporting for NPR, Gabino Iglesias describes the collection as showcasing "Atwood's imagination and her perennial obsession with getting to the core of what makes us human while dishing out plenty of entertainment and eye-opening revelations along the way."
