= The Animals in That Country =

1986 poetry collection by Margaret Atwood

First edition (publ. Little, Brown)

The Animals in That Country is a 1968 poetry collection written by Canadian author Margaret Atwood. It is her fifth volume of poetry.

Like other works by Atwood, The Animals in That Country explores themes relating to human behaviour and celebration of the natural world, with some of the poems expressing an ecocentric perspective and using the difference between the animals of the Old World and the New World to scrutinize issues like power politics, feminism and human existence.

== Title ==
The title of the volume makes a distinction between "that country" and "this country" as a commentary on the differences between Europe and the New World. The animals in "that country" are described as having "the faces of people" and their deaths being romanticized as coming about as part of ceremonial or legendary scenarios, such as fox hunts or bull fights. By comparison, the animals in "this country", have "the faces of animals" and perish in commonplace and unsung ways, such as being hit by cars.

The 2020 novel of the same name by Laura Jean McKay is named in homage to Atwood's collection.
