= The Door (poetry collection) =

Poetry collection by Margaret Atwood

- First edition (publ. Virago Press)
- Author: Margaret Atwood
- Publisher: Little, Brown Book Group
- Publication date: January 1, 2007
- ISBN: 978-1-844-08458-6

The Door is a book of poetry by Canadian author Margaret Atwood, published in 2007.

The poems of The Door demonstrate self-awareness on the part of the author. They confront themes of advancing age and encroaching death (Atwood was 68 in 2007), as well as authorial fame and the drive to produce writing. Less autobiographical themes are also explored in The Door, including environmental issues, torture and war, and the relation of the personal and the political.

The Door is divided into five sections.

1. The first section explores personal loss, of parents, cats or childhood.
2. The second section explores the role of the poet.
3. The third section confronts the horrors of contemporary life.
4. The fourth section defends the despondency of section three.
5. The fifth section explores the domestic relationship between lovers, in an echo of Atwood's earlier collection You Are Happy
