= Double Persephone =

Book by Margaret Atwood

- Cover of a copy of Double Persephone
- Author: Margaret Atwood
- Cover artist: Margaret Atwood
- Language: English
- Genre: Poetry
- Publication date: 1961
- Publication place: Canadian

Double Persephone is a self-published poetry collection written by Canadian author Margaret Atwood in 1961. Atwood handset the book herself with a flat bed press, designed the cover with linoblocks, and only made 220 copies. It was the first publication released by Atwood, and comprises seven poems: "Formal Garden", "Pastoral", "Iconic Landscape", "Persephone Departing", "Chthonic Love", "Her Song", and "Double Persephone".

Atwood followed up the collection with another book of poetry released in 1964, The Circle Game.

The collection won the EJ Pratt medal.
