= Speeches for Doctor Frankenstein =

First edition

Speeches for Doctor Frankenstein is a poetry collection written by Canadian author Margaret Atwood, published in 1966. It is illustrated by Charles Pachter. In 1991 there remained fourteen copies of the work, each worth approximately C$6,000.
