= Circle game =

Circle game may refer to:

- The Circle Game (poetry collection), a 1964 poetry collection by Margaret Atwood
- "The Circle Game" (song), a song by Joni Mitchell; covered by Buffy Sainte-Marie, Ian and Sylvia, Tom Rush, and most recently James McCartney
- The Circle Game (album), a 1968 album by Tom Rush, featuring the Joni Mitchell song
- The Circle Game (film), a 1994 drama film directed by Brigitte Berman
- "Circle Game", a song on the Pink album Hurts 2B Human (2019)
- A children's prank involving the OK gesture
