= Bernard Gordon (writer) =

American writer and producer (1918–2007)

- Born: October 29, 1918; New Britain, Connecticut, U.S.
- Died: May 11, 2007 (aged 88); Hollywood, California, U.S.
- Education: City College of New York
- Occupation: Writer
- Spouse: Jean Lewin
- Writing career
- Pen name: Raymond T. Marcus
- Language: English
- Notable works: Flesh and Fury, Earth vs. the Flying Saucers, 55 Days at Peking

Bernard Gordon (October 29, 1918 – May 11, 2007) was an American writer and producer. For much of his 27-year career he was prevented from taking screen credit by the Hollywood Blacklist. Among his best-known works are screenplays for Flesh and Fury (1952), Earth vs. the Flying Saucers (1956), and 55 Days at Peking (1963).

== Biography ==
=== Early life ===
Gordon was born in New Britain, Connecticut, to Kitty and William Gordon, Jewish immigrants from Russia. His father managed a hardware store and Gordon grew up in New York City, where he attended the City College.

=== Professional work ===
Beginning as a writer for print, Gordon moved to California and got a production job as a script reader, providing written "coverage" of screenplays submitted to studios. A political activist and, briefly in the 1940s, a member of the Communist Party, Gordon helped found the Screen Readers Guild. He married fellow activist Jean Lewin in 1946, one of the organizers of the Hollywood Canteen during the war.

His first produced screenplay was Flesh and Fury (1952), a gritty boxing picture starring an up-and-coming actor named Tony Curtis. A western with Rock Hudson (The Lawless Breed) followed in 1953, but Gordon was subpoenaed to testify to the House Un-American Activities Committee (HUAC) investigating communist influence in Hollywood. Although subpoenaed, Gordon was never called to testify, and thus remained in a legal limbo. His producer, William Alland, had named Gordon in his own testimony to HUAC. A former left-wing sympathizer himself, Alland regularly informed the government about the political leanings of writers with whom he dealt at Universal Pictures.

=== Pseudonymous work ===
In 1954, Gordon received an under-the-table assignment from producer Charles Schneer, who worked with Columbia Pictures' low-budget maven Sam Katzman. Gordon adapted a play written by two friends, which became the film The Law vs. Billy the Kid. Schneer employed Gordon many times during the 1950s, memorably as screenwriter of Earth vs. the Flying Saucers, a low-budget alien-invasion film with special effects by Ray Harryhausen. Gordon worked under the pen name Raymond T. Marcus, a friend who was not in the film business. These low-paying assignments were generally B-level potboilers. Notably, one of the Schneer films was the only feature film to co-star Ronald Reagan and his wife Nancy Davis, Hellcats of the Navy (1957). Reagan's political views were diametrically opposed to the then-blacklisted Gordon, though after Reagan was elected president he denied blacklisting had occurred despite evidence proving this inaccuracy. Gordon took ironic satisfaction in having written an introduction for the esteemed Admiral Chester Nimitz and having Reagan give voice to his words on film that was broadcast on television during his two terms as president. Another film for which Gordon wrote pseudonymously due to the Black List was Zombies of Mora Tau (1957).

=== Success in exile ===
Through his friendship with writer/entrepreneur Philip Yordan, Gordon found regular work as a writer and producer in Madrid for the Samuel Bronston Productions. At first, however, he was still denied screen credit, with Yordan frequently listing himself as sole author of films including Circus World (1964), Battle of the Bulge (1965), Custer of the West (1967) and The Day of the Triffids (1963). Gordon did receive on-screen credit for 55 Days at Peking (1963), and the first screen adaptation of The Thin Red Line (1964). As a producer, he made a number of westerns in Spain and the well-received sci-fi thriller Horror Express (1972), co-starring Peter Cushing and Christopher Lee. Another film he wrote, Cry of Battle, was playing at the theater in which Lee Harvey Oswald was arrested by Dallas police on 22 November 1963.

55 Days at Peking contains the first known occurrence of the phrase “Let China sleep. For when she wakes, the world will tremble”, which are often mistakenly attributed to Napoleon Bonaparte. There, the actress Elizabeth Sellars asks David Niven (who plays the British ambassador in China during the Boxer Rebellion in 1900) if he remembers what Napoleon said about China. Niven then quotes the now-famous phrase that when China rouses from its slumber, all hell will break loose. The quotation is specific to the screenplay by principal scriptwriter, Bernard Gordon, since the remark and attribution do not appear in either the English or French versions of the 1963 book by Noel Gerson (written under the pseudonym Samuel Edwards). It is likely that Bernard Gordon invented the phrase “Let China sleep. For when she wakes, the world will tremble”.

=== Resurfacing and retroactive credits ===
Returning to the US, Gordon had trouble finding work until his former production secretary in Madrid, Lisa Doty, found him a job in Canada adapting Margaret Atwood's 1972 novel Surfacing for producer Beryl Fox. Director Claude Jutra made it into a film in 1981.

Gordon's blacklist-era work remained relatively anonymous until journalist Ted Newsom happened upon the man behind the assumed name "Raymond T. Marcus" (a name under which Gordon wrote or co-wrote). When the Writers Guild of America took up the task of correctly crediting pseudonymous screenwriters from the 1950s and 1960s, awarding retroactive screen credits to them, Gordon received more after-the-fact credits than any other blacklisted writer. His first film to receive posthumous credit was The Day of the Triffids (1963).

Gordon subsequently wrote two autobiographical books detailing the 20-year surveillance of him by the FBI, and often spoke publicly about his experiences. He helped lead the unsuccessful fight against the Academy of Motion Picture Arts and Sciences Lifetime Achievement Award to Elia Kazan, who cooperated with HUAC during the blacklist era.

Gordon died on May 11, 2007, in Hollywood, California.

== Books ==
- Hollywood Exile, or How I Learned to Love the Blacklist (University of Texas Press, 1999), ISBN 978-0-292-72833-2
- The Gordon File: A Screenwriter Recalls Twenty Years of FBI Surveillance (University of Texas Press, 2004), ISBN 978-0-292-71955-2
