= Bodily Harm (novel) =

1981 novel by Margaret Atwood

- First edition cover
- Author: Margaret Atwood
- Language: English
- Publisher: McClelland & Stewart
- Publication date: 1981
- Publication place: Canada
- Media type: Print (Hardcover, Paperback)
- Pages: 301
- ISBN: 0-7704-2256-X (first edition)
- OCLC: 257154527
- Preceded by: Life Before Man
- Followed by: The Handmaid's Tale

Bodily Harm is a novel by Margaret Atwood. It was first published by McClelland and Stewart in 1981.

== Plot introduction ==
The novel's protagonist Rennie Wilford is a travel reporter. After surviving breast cancer, she travels to the fictional Caribbean island St. Antoine to carry out research for an article. The island, however, is on the brink of revolution. Rennie tries to stay away from politics, but is drawn into events through her romance with Paul, a key player in the uprising, and ends up in a survival struggle.

== Themes ==
A major theme of Bodily Harm is power.

As in many of the heroines of Atwood's novels, Rennie is addicted to negative relationships. She feels "hooked like a junkie" to her relationship with Jake, and becomes unable to distinguish between sadomasochism and genuine aggression.

== Reception ==
In The Boston Phoenix, Carolyn Clay felt that "Bodily Harm may not be startling — you can see Rennie's epiphany coming for miles and miles — but it is very smooth. And there are sometimes wry, sometimes brutal side-trips into the anomie of modern life, not to mention barefoot treks through the sifting sand of sexual relationships, that are worth the time."
