= The Animals in That Country (novel) =

2020 novel by Laura Jean McKay

- Author: Laura Jean McKay
- Language: English
- Genre: Science fiction
- Publisher: Scribe
- Publication date: March 31, 2020
- Publication place: Australia
- Pages: 288
- Awards: Victorian Premier's Prize for Fiction (2021); Arthur C. Clarke Award (2021); Aurealis–Science Fiction Novel (2020)
- ISBN: 978-1925849530 (original paperback)
- OCLC: 1276806803

The Animals in That Country is a 2020 science fiction novel by Australian writer Laura Jean McKay, published by Scribe. The novel won the Aurealis Award for Best Science Fiction Novel (2020), Arthur C. Clarke Award (2021), Victorian Prize for Literature (2021), and Victorian Premier's Prize for Fiction (2021).

In the novel, "A pandemic enables animals and humans to communicate", resulting "in a fierce and funny exploration of other consciousnesses and the limits of language."

== Background ==
The Animals in That Country was inspired by McKay's experiences of the chikungunya virus caught at a writer's festival in Bali in 2013. She had started working on the novel at that time; its eventual release at the start of COVID-19 pandemic was a coincidence. McKay said of her experiences recording the audiobook in March 2020:

I had spent years concocting the most impossible virus, only to witness a disease beyond my imagination infecting, killing and driving the real world towards global isolation. It was a relief to get back into the booth and read the sections of the book where the animals start talking.

The title is a homage to a 1968 poetry collection by Margaret Atwood.

== Reception ==
The Animals in That Country received a starred review from Shelf Awareness. Booklist said the novel is "not just a horror story ... but one filled with humor, optimism, and grace: a wild ride worth taking." The Guardian described it as an "extraordinary debut", and "a stirring attempt to inhabit other consciousnesses and a wry demonstration of the limits of our own language and empathy."

The director of the Arthur C. Clarke Award said, "The novel speaks for the silent victims of our real-world climate crises, but while the environmental and social themes are deeply serious, our judges also praised the book's dark humour, sense of character and place, and its active opposition to easy genre tropes."

Slate named The Animals in That Country one of the top ten books of 2020. The Sunday Times selected it as one of the five best science-fiction books of the year.

Awards for The Animals in That Country
Year	Award	Category	Result	Ref.
2020	Aurealis Award	Aurealis–Best Science Fiction Novel	Won	
2020	Kitschies	Golden Tentacle (Debut)	Nominated	
2021	ABIA	Small Publishers' Adult Book of the Year	Won	
2021	Arthur C. Clarke Award	—	Won	
2021	Australian Literature Society	ALS Gold Medal	Shortlisted	
2021	Miles Franklin Literary Award	—	Longlisted	
2021	Readings Prize	New Australian Fiction	Shortlisted	
2021	Stella Prize	—	Shortlisted	
2021	Victorian Premier's Literary Award	Victorian Prize for Literature	Won	
2021	Victorian Premier's Literary Award	Victorian Premier's Prize for Fiction	Won	
