= Procedures for Underground =

First edition

Procedures for Underground is a book of poetry written by Canadian author Margaret Atwood. It was published in hardcover by Little, Brown and Company in 1970, and in paperback by both Little, Brown and Company and Oxford University Press, Canada in 1971. The poems of Procedures for Underground explore the territory of the psyche, evoking mythological archetypes, subconscious experience, and personal obsessions. This space of epiphanies and metamorphosis is, for Atwood, the "underground."
