= The Journals of Susanna Moodie =

Book by Margaret Atwood

- First edition
- Author: Margaret Atwood
- Language: English
- Genre: Poetry
- Publisher: Oxford University Press
- Publication date: 1970
- Publication place: Canada
- ISBN: 978-0-19-540169-1

The Journals of Susanna Moodie is a book of poetry by Margaret Atwood, first published in 1970.

In the book, Atwood adopts the voice of Susanna Moodie, a noted early Canadian writer, and attempts to imagine and convey Moodie's feelings about life in the Canada of her era. The book separates into three separate journals, which cover her arrival in 1832 to a post-death narration ending in 1969. Journal One is from 1832–1840, Journal Two encompasses 1841–1870, and Journal Three continues on until 1969, wherein a dead Susanna Moodie comments on twentieth century Canada.

The book was later republished in 1997 with a new series of illustrations by artist Charles Pachter.
