= Laura Jean McKay =

Australian author

- Born: 1978 (age 47–48); Orbost, Australia
- Education: University of Melbourne (PhD)
- Occupations: Author; lecturer in creative writing
- Writing career
- Notable work: The Animals in That Country (2020)
- Notable awards: Victorian Prize for Literature (2021); Arthur C. Clarke Award (2021)

Laura Jean McKay (born 1978) is an Australian author and creative writing lecturer. In 2021, she won the Victorian Prize for Literature and the Arthur C. Clarke Award for her novel The Animals in That Country. In 2025, she was the Frank O'Connor International Fellow.

== Life and career ==
Born in 1978, McKay grew up in Sale, in the Gippsland region of the Australian state of Victoria. She worked at international aid organisations in Cambodia after the 2004 Indian Ocean earthquake and tsunami, and subsequently wrote Holiday in Cambodia while completing an MA in creative writing at the University of Melbourne. She completed a PhD at the University of Melbourne, where she wrote The Animals in that Country. Since June 2019 McKay has been a lecturer in creative writing at Massey University in New Zealand. She was nominated as the Frank O'Connor International Short Story Fellow in 2025.

She has said that Janet Frame is one of her writing influences: "I still turn to Frame when I've forgotten how to flip the world over and look at it from a new perspective".

=== Holiday in Cambodia ===
McKay's first book, Holiday in Cambodia, a short story collection, was published by Black Inc. in 2013. It was shortlisted for the Glenda Adams Award for New Writing at the New South Wales Premier's Literary Awards, the Steele Rudd Award for an Australian short story collection at the Queensland Premier's Literary Awards, and the Asher Award. The stories in the collection examine the effects of expatriate life and foreign influence on Cambodian people.

=== The Animals in That Country ===
McKay's second book and debut novel, The Animals in That Country, was published by Scribe Australia in March 2020, by Scribe UK in September 2020, and by Scribe US in November 2020. A second edition was published in the UK in July 2021. The novel is a speculative fiction book about communication between species sparked by a pandemic, and was inspired by her experiences of the chikungunya virus caught at a writer's festival in Bali in 2013. She had started working on the novel at that time and its eventual release at the start of COVID-19 pandemic was a coincidence. McKay said of her experiences recording the audiobook in March 2020:

I had spent years concocting the most impossible virus, only to witness a disease beyond my imagination infecting, killing and driving the real world towards global isolation. It was a relief to get back into the booth and read the sections of the book where the animals start talking.

The title is a homage to an early poetry collection by Margaret Atwood. The Guardian described it as an "extraordinary debut", and "a stirring attempt to inhabit other consciousnesses and a wry demonstration of the limits of our own language and empathy". Slate editor Dan Kois selected it as one of his ten best books of 2020, and Simon Ings selected it as one of the five best science-fiction books of 2020 for The Sunday Times.

In February 2021, the novel won the Victorian Prize for Literature, Australia's richest literary award, as well as the Fiction Award at the Victorian Premier's Literary Awards. The novel also won an Australian Book Industry Award for Small Publisher's Adult Book of the Year, and an Aurealis Award for best science fiction novel (co-win with Corey J White for Repo Virtual). It was shortlisted for the ALS Gold Medal, the Readings Prize for New Australian Fiction, and the Stella Prize.

In September 2021 the novel was announced to be the winner of the Arthur C. Clarke Award, presented in the UK to the best science fiction novel of the year. The director of the award said "the novel speaks for the silent victims of our real-world climate crises, but while the environmental and social themes are deeply serious, our judges also praised the book's dark humour, sense of character and place, and its active opposition to easy genre tropes". In February 2022 Laura was awarded the NZSA Waitangi Day Literary Honour. The French edition, Les animaux de ce pays (éditions Dalva 2025, translated by Lise Garond), won the 2025 Prix Gargantua and was shortlisted for the 2026 Prix Maya, a prize that rewards works 'advancing the animal cause', as well as being shortlisted for the 2025 Prix 30 millions d’amis.

=== Gunflower ===
McKay's third book Gunflower was published in September 2023 and shortlisted for The Queensland Literary Awards Steele Rudd Award for a Short Story Collection 2024. It is a collection of short stories, poems and vignettes written over a period of 20 years. The New Zealand Listener called it "an excellent follow-up" to McKay's previous works. The Saturday Paper said it "extends and deepens the achievement" of The Animals in That Country, with a similar focus on non-human perspectives, and that the stories in the collection range "from darkly comic surreal flashes to uncomfortably realistic portraits of life in a world of precarious work and disintegrating social safety nets".

Nina Allan in The Guardian said that with this collection McKay "reaffirms her virtuosic ability to twist consensus reality into unfamiliar shapes", and that "as readers we should pay careful attention to what its singularly talented author has to say to us". The book was subsequently named by The Guardian as one of the best fiction books of 2023.

== Selected works ==
- McKay, Laura Jean (2013). Holiday in Cambodia. Black Inc. p. 216. ISBN 978-1863956062.
- —— (2020). The Animals in That Country. Scribe Australia. p. 288. ISBN 978-1925849530.
- —— (2023). Gunflower: Stories. Scribe Australia. p. 256. ISBN 978-1922585943.
