= Alias Grace =

1996 novel by Margaret Atwood

- First edition cover
- Author: Margaret Atwood
- Cover artist: Dante Gabriel Rossetti, Head of a Girl in a Green dress, 1850–65; Kong (first edition design)
- Language: English
- Genre: Historical fiction
- Publisher: McClelland & Stewart (CAN); Bloomsbury Publishing (UK)
- Publication date: September 1996
- Publication place: Canada
- Media type: Print (hardcover & paperback)
- Pages: 470 pp.
- ISBN: 0-7710-0835-X (first CAN edition); 0-7475-2787-3 (first UK edition)
- OCLC: 35936659

Alias Grace is a historical fiction novel by Canadian writer Margaret Atwood. First published in 1996 by McClelland & Stewart, it won the Giller Prize and was shortlisted for the Booker Prize.

The story fictionalizes the notorious 1843 murders of Thomas Kinnear and his housekeeper Nancy Montgomery in Canada West. Two servants of the Kinnear household, Grace Marks and James McDermott, were convicted of the crime. McDermott was hanged and Marks was sentenced to life imprisonment.

Although the novel is based on factual events, Atwood constructs a narrative with a fictional doctor, Simon Jordan, who researches the case. While Jordan is ostensibly conducting research into criminal behaviour, he slowly becomes personally involved in the Marks story and seeks to reconcile his perception of the mild-mannered woman he sees with the murder of which she has been convicted.

Atwood first encountered the story of Marks in Life in the Clearings Versus the Bush by Susanna Moodie. In 1970, Atwood published The Journals of Susanna Moodie, a cycle of poems informed by the published works of Moodie. It became a classic of Canadian literature, as it lyrically evokes the experience of life in the wilderness, immigrant life, and colonial times. Subsequently, Atwood wrote the 1974 CBC Television film The Servant Girl about Marks, also based on Susanna Moodie's account. However, in Alias Grace, Atwood says that she has changed her opinion of Marks, having read more widely and discovered that Moodie had fabricated parts of her third-hand account of the murders.

== Plot summary ==
Grace Marks, the convicted murderess, has been hired out from prison to serve as a domestic servant in the home of the Governor of the penitentiary. A committee of gentlemen and ladies from the Methodist church, led by the minister, hopes to have her pardoned and released. Grace cannot remember what happened on the day of the murders, and she exhibits symptoms of hysteria, so the minister hires Dr. Simon Jordan, a psychiatrist, to interview her, hoping he will find her to be an hysteric, and not a criminal. An arrangement is made so that Jordan will interview Grace during afternoons in the sewing room in the governor's mansion.

Jordan tries to lead Grace into talking about her dreams and her memories, but she evades his suggestions, so he asks her to start at the beginning, and she proceeds to tell him the story of her life. Grace tells of early childhood in Ireland where her father was often drunk and her mother often pregnant and Grace had to take care of the younger children. She tells the doctor details of the filthy crowded conditions in the hold of the ship where her mother sickened and died. In Canada, because her father continued to spend his earnings on alcohol, she and the children nearly starved and with her mother gone, Grace's father began abusing her and even at one point attempted to rape her. Jordan listens but is impatient, viewing her early privations and abuse as irrelevant to the case.

As a serving girl, Grace tells the doctor how she met Mary Whitney, then her roommate and only friend. Mary taught Grace how to act the role of a servant, and joked with her about the family's upper class airs, when nobody else was listening. Giving motherly advice on how to stay out of trouble with young men, Mary told her "if there is a ring, there had better be a parson". Mary herself became pregnant – presumably by a son of the family – and died from a botched abortion. Grace had helped Mary get home and into bed, but awoke the next morning to find Mary dead. Grace was troubled afterwards by the idea that she should have opened the window during the night when Mary died to let her soul out.

Grace continues her story in vivid detail, making an effort to keep the doctor interested. He is aroused by Grace's descriptions of James McDermott's advances and Thomas Kinnear's affair with Nancy Montgomery. The doctor's landlady, whose drunken husband had by then left her, throws herself at him. He is not attracted to her and turns her away several times. He gives her money so she can keep the house thinking she will stop bothering him, but that only provokes her to try harder until she finally seduces him once, only for him to tell her that he wished it to be with someone else and never with her.

A spiritualist on the committee has long since proposed that a Dr. DuPont, "Neuro-Hypnotist", should put Grace in a trance and arouse her unconscious memory. Jordan, now mostly concerned with escaping the designs of his landlady, can no longer dissuade the committee. Grace meets DuPont, who she discovers is actually Jeremiah, one of her friends from her old employment, in disguise. It appears to all present that after DuPont puts Grace to sleep, the voice of Mary Whitney takes over, gleefully telling everyone she haunted Grace because her soul was not freed when she died. She said she possessed Grace's body on the day of the murders, and drove McDermott to help her kill Montgomery and Kinnear. She says Grace does not remember because she did not know what happened. Jordan allows that there have been some scientific reports of a "double personality" phenomenon, but he evades the committee's request for his report and leaves town, claiming his mother is ill. He promises to send them the report, but returning home, he promptly joins the Union Army. After he is wounded in the war, he moves into his mother's house. The last word he says is "Grace". Grace eventually is pardoned, and according to the novel she changes her name and begins a new life in the United States.

== Main characters ==
- Grace Marks the murderess was in fact a model prisoner and eventually pardoned. In the novel, she maintains a carefully respectful demeanour. She is more intelligent and observant than she lets on. While she very much resents being made a spectacle as the famed murderess, she is grateful for the effort being made to have her pardoned.
- Thomas Kinnear was a wealthy Scottish farmer who was murdered in his home in Richmond Hill, Ontario.
- Nancy Montgomery, Kinnear's mistress and housekeeper and the murder victim of James McDermott and Grace.
- James McDermott was convicted of the murder of Kinnear and executed. He was employed as a stableman and handyman at Kinnear's. He was reputed to be a rough character, a rebellious Irishman, resentful of the English. In the novel, being told to answer to Kinnear's housekeeper, Nancy Montgomery, infuriated McDermott.
- Simon Jordan, M.D., is a fictional character, a well-traveled and educated young physician who intends to make his career in mental health, planning to open a private asylum someday.
- Mary Whitney is a fictional character, a maid, and friend of Grace. Mary believes in herself and in Canada as a place that a hard-working girl can earn her way. She plans to save her wages for a dowry so she can marry a farmer and be mistress of her own home.
- Jeremiah Pontelli is a fictional character. Jeremiah the peddler, alias Geraldo Ponti, magician, alias Dr. Jerome DuPont, "Neuro-Hypnotist", first met Grace when she was a new housemaid and he was peddling house to house in Toronto. When he called at the Kinnear house, he told her he feared she might be in danger there and told her a glimpse into her future.

== Setting ==
Grace Marks, born in 1826, lived in or near Toronto from age 12 until 16, when the famous murders took place. She had resided in the Kingston Penitentiary in Kingston, Ontario for 15 years in 1859, when the novel begins. Among Toronto and Kingston society, Atwood portrays the highly moralistic, straitlaced language and behaviour of the Victorian era. By contrast, it is evident that Mary Whitney's crude comments would have been shocking even among servants of that time.

The study of mental health, called "alienism", was a new development at the time. It was first taught in European universities, and advocated that inmates be treated as patients rather than prisoners. Although the Victorian era was a time of some scientific progress, many Victorians were very much interested in the paranormal, supernatural and occult, hence the use of mesmerism, hypnotism, or spiritualism were viewed as legitimate methods of inquiry.

Atwood chose Richmond Hill, Ontario as the location of the Kinnear farm within Upper Canada. In September 2009, 13 years after the release of the book, Richmond Hill introduced "Alias Grace Park" named after the book.

== Politics ==
The Rebellion of 1837 had taken place six years before the Kinnear and Montgomery murders in 1843, but it still affected public sentiment. The Rebellion terrorized the upper classes even though the rebels were quickly defeated. Government reforms made soon after the Rebellion reduced corruption and restricted the power of the ruling oligarchies, which also worried the upper classes. The idea that the lower classes could rise above their station by hard work or cleverness (rather than by ancestry and inheritance) was finding acceptance in the United States, so the Canadian aristocracy, basing their identity on their English heritage, felt threatened.

== Style ==
The novel is written in the Southern Ontario Gothic style, highlighting the social ills of the time, while exhibiting the corruption and moral hypocrisy of the upper class. Supernatural phenomena, like the ghost of Mary Whitney, fit the Gothic style, as well as the Victorian spiritualist sensibility, justifying the ghost of Mary Whitney's gleefully evil confession. Returning from the dead is a recurring theme in Atwood's novels.

The main narrator is Grace, whose thoughts and speech are in the first person, and sometimes blend into one another without quotation marks to indicate what is said out loud and what is not. This creates uncertainty at times, echoing the doctor's uncertainty about Grace's truthfulness, and the reader's uncertainty about her guilt. Dr. Jordan's thoughts and actions are told by a focalized third-person narrator, as well as his own point of view, allowing the reader to see the contradictions between his words, sometimes even his thoughts, and his actions, as does the inclusion of his correspondence in the book. Similarly, other people's letters and quotations from newspapers, letters, poems, and other textual sources echo the patchwork quilting metaphor in that the author used many sources from various perspectives to piece together the whole story.

The portrayal of Grace Marks through a postmodern narrative has been viewed as a deliberate contrast with her faithful reproduction of the details of Victorian domestic life, or as a deliberate defense against Grace's objectification. The idea that a gentleman in Victorian Canada would sit in a sewing room day after day listening to the life story of a female servant (no matter how pretty or well-mannered or notorious she might be) is of course, incongruous. However, as Margaret Atwood herself pointed out, "In a Victorian novel, Grace would say, "Now it all comes back to me"; but as Alias Grace is not a Victorian novel, she does not say that, and, if she did, would we—any longer—believe her?"

== Main themes ==
=== Women's history ===
Atwood has often used images of sewing and other domestic arts in her novels, illustrating women's creativity, constrained as it was, historically, to domestic objects. Names of quilt patterns are used as titles of the 15 book sections in Alias Grace, making parallels between Grace's interest in quilts and the meanings of their patterns and Grace's storytelling, her creation of a domestic history, in which Dr. Jordan hopes to discern patterns. Grace tells her life story to the doctor as a chronology, but, as she does, she reflects on what she tells him like it was a patchwork of experiences. Each patch is destined to fill a particular place in the quilt, and they must all be created before the quilt can be assembled, much as historical research, and especially research on women in history, requires examination of many disparate sources in order to construct a chronological account.

=== Identity ===
Modern readers may not be satisfied with the idea that Mary, alias Grace, was the murderer. Others might view the use of the term "alias" in the title as suggesting that in their search for the truth about Grace Marks, both readers and characters may be frustrated by duplicity. Grace resists being completely comprehended by these men of power, scientific or religious. She belongs instead to the marginal communities of immigrants, servants, and mad people, who are always vulnerable, and often lost—as Grace lost her mother, and Mary Whitney (her only friend). The only simple truths for Grace are about things—quilts, sheets, carpets, petticoats, the laundry of her life; she gains confidence from a needle and thread. As Margaret Atwood says, "The true character of the historical Grace Marks remains an enigma." It may be noted that the publication of this book corresponds in time with the height of psychiatric interest in "multiple personality disorder" as a legitimate category of illness. This idea goes back to the late 19th century and is associated with the practice of Mesmerism, which evolved into a technique called clinical hypnosis that was often relied upon as a source of "truth" in patients who were otherwise prone to telling the clinician what the clinician wanted to hear. This technique has been largely discredited by the accumulated evidence that trance causes in its subjects increased certainty of the truth of certain memories, whether or not they are in fact true, and that what we remember is often substantially distorted by our own desires. From a psychiatric perspective, Atwood's version of Grace's story is entirely consistent with a diagnosis of multiple personality disorder, including the perplexing fact that the clinician can rarely be certain of the actual events "remembered" by the patient.

== Adaptations ==
In 2012, Sarah Polley announced that she would be adapting Alias Grace into a feature film. This has since evolved into a television miniseries which aired on CBC Television in Canada in October and November 2017, and streams globally on Netflix.

In 2016, Ball State University premiered a stage version written by Jennifer Blackmer. The same adaptation was then produced by Rivendell Theatre Ensemble in Chicago, IL, directed by Karen Kessler.
