= Interlunar =

First edition (publ. OUP)

Interlunar is a 1984 poetry collection by Canadian author Margaret Atwood. One of her lesser documented works, the collection is divided into two sections. The first, Snake Woman, explores one of her favorite motifs, the snake. The second section, Interlunar, deals with themes of darkness. It features a poem The Robber Bridegroom, that she later used as a title for a novel. Interlunar features several more myths related from a female point of view, including Orpheus, Eurydice, and Letter from Persephone.
