= Life Before Man =

Novel by Canadian writer Margaret Atwood

- Cover of the first edition
- Author: Margaret Atwood
- Language: English
- Publisher: McClelland & Stewart
- Publication date: 1979
- Publication place: Canada
- Media type: Print
- Pages: 317
- ISBN: 0-7710-0807-4

Life Before Man is a novel by Canadian writer Margaret Atwood. It was first published by McClelland and Stewart in 1979 and was a finalist for the Governor General's Award.

== Plot ==
The novel has three principal characters: Nate, Elizabeth and Lesje. Nate and Elizabeth are an unhappily married couple, with both husband and wife involved in extramarital affairs. Lesje, pronounced 'Lashia,' is Nate's lover of mixed (Ukrainian and Jewish) ancestry and works along with his wife in the department of paleontology in Royal Ontario Museum in Toronto as a paleontologist fascinated by dinosaurs, giving the book its title. (Both the museum and the city are described in the book in great detail and are immediately recognizable. The author also pays a lot of attention to Lesje's search of identity; her mixed ethnic roots caused her in the past and continue to cause her considerable anguish.) Elizabeth, said to have been inspired by Shirley Gibson, ex-wife of Atwood's partner Graeme Gibson, also takes a lover, Chris, who recently died by suicide. All three of the novel's main characters influence the narration, with each chapter presenting events from a particular character's perspective.

== Reception and reviews ==
Feminist author Marilyn French gave the novel a positive review in the New York Times, calling it a "splendid, fully integrated work."
