= Grace Marks =

Pardoned accessory to an 1843 Canadian murder

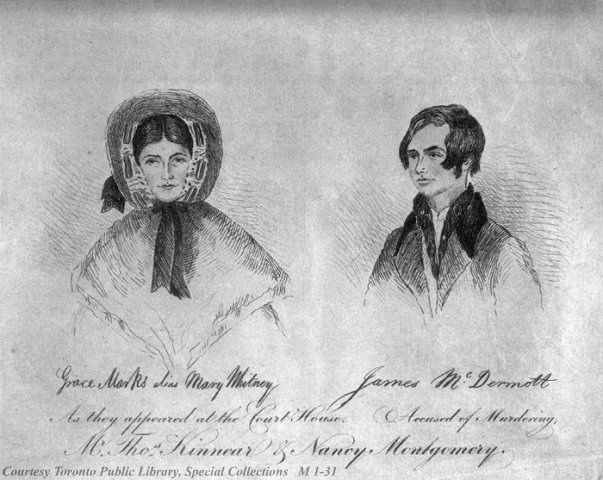
- A sketch of Marks alias "Mary Whitney" and James McDermott at their trial
- Born: c. 1828
- Died: after c. 1873
- Other name: Mary Whitney
- Occupation: Maid
- Known for: Murder conviction

Grace Marks (c. 1828 – after c. 1873) was an Irish-Canadian maid who was involved in the 1843 murder of her employer Thomas Kinnear and his housekeeper, Nancy Montgomery, in Richmond Hill, Ontario. Her conviction for the murder of Kinnear was controversial and sparked much debate about whether Marks was actually instrumental in the murder or merely an unwitting accessory. Marks was the subject of Margaret Atwood's historical fiction novel Alias Grace and its adaptations in other media.

== Early life ==
Marks was born and raised in Ulster, Ireland. Her father, John Marks, was a stonemason and an abusive alcoholic. She, along with her parents and eight siblings, immigrated to Upper Canada in 1840, when Grace was twelve. Her mother died on the ship en route to Canada and was buried at sea.

== Murders ==
Marks was employed as a maid in the house of Yonge Street farmer Thomas Kinnear, who was in a sexual relationship with his housekeeper, Nancy Montgomery. In July 1843, Kinnear and Montgomery were murdered by James McDermott, a servant. Kinnear was shot and Montgomery, who was pregnant at the time of her death, was hit on the head with an axe and subsequently strangled before being hidden under a large tub. Under the alias "Mary Whitney", Marks fled with McDermott to the U.S., but they were apprehended in Lewiston, New York, and deported to Toronto. It remains unclear whether Marks took part in the double murder.

Marks was tried with McDermott for the murder of Kinnear. A trial for Montgomery's murder was to follow, but was deemed unnecessary as both defendants were convicted of Kinnear's murder and sentenced to death. Before McDermott was hanged, he insisted that Marks was, "an evil genius who masterminded the double murder, then feigned mental illness in order to avoid the gallows". Marks's sentence, however, was commuted to life in prison which she served in Kingston Penitentiary. At one period (May 4, 1852 – August 18, 1853) she was committed to an asylum but was later returned to Kingston Penitentiary. In 1872, after almost thirty years of incarceration, Marks was pardoned and moved to upstate New York. After that she disappeared from the historical record.

== Popular portrayal ==
What is known of Marks on the historical record comes primarily from Susanna Moodie's book Life in the Clearings Versus the Bush. She is the subject of Margaret Atwood's historical fiction novel Alias Grace and played by Sarah Gadon in the 2017 television adaptation directed by Mary Harron. Alias Grace was adapted for the stage by Jennifer Blackmer and premiered at the Rivendell Theater in Chicago on September 1, 2017.

== Bibliography ==
- Margaret Atwood: Alias Grace: London: Bloomsbury: 1996: ISBN 0-7475-2787-3
- Gina Wisker: Margaret Atwood's Alias Grace: A Reader's Guide; Continuum: 2002: ISBN 0-8264-5706-1
- George Walton: The trials of James McDermott and Grace Marks at Toronto, Upper Canada, November 3rd and 4th 1843 for the murder of Thomas Kinnear, Esquire and his housekeeper Nancy Montgomery, at Richmond Hill, township of Vaughan, home district, Upper Canada, on Saturday, 29th July, 1843 : with their confessions since their trials and their portraits; Transcript Office, Toronto, Canada: 1843 Available online at Hathitrust
