= The Last of the Crazy People =

First edition (UK)

The Last of the Crazy People is the first novel of Canadian author Timothy Findley. It was published in 1967, in Britain, and later on in Canada, and was one of the first novels ever to be labelled as Southern Ontario Gothic.

The novel tells the story of a well-to-do Ontarian family in the 1960s, whose future becomes uncertain when Jessica (the wife/mother) gives birth to a stillborn and returns home only to become hostile to the rest of the family, and to imprison herself in her own room.

The family is put under even more stress as Gilbert, the elder son, begins to act out in drunken outbursts and questionable behavior in public. The yelling and arguing in the house only helps to reinforce the family's reputation as 'crazy'.

As the few fine threads holding the family together quickly deteriorate over the summer, Hooker is left mostly in the dark as to why this is happening to them. Left to mostly his own devices, he must come to his own terrifying conclusion as to what must be done about it.

== Main characters ==
Hooker Winslow – Hooker, the novel's protagonist, is the youngest member of the Winslow family. Hooker has no friends and spends a lot of his time properly burying the mice, birds and other animals killed by his cats. The rest of it he spends either alone, or with his caretaker Iris. He is trying to hold his family together.

Gilbert Winslow – Gilbert, Hooker's older brother, is a 22-year-old prep school drop-out who lives in the family library, and spends most of his time drinking, smoking and talking even though no one listens to him.

Jessica Winslow – Hooker and Gilbert's mother, she is a volatile recluse who irrationally despises her children and motherhood after giving birth to a dead child.

Nicholas Winslow – Hooker and Gilbert's father, Nicholas (or 'Nick' as he is often called) is a Toronto businessman who has all but resigned to let everything in the Winslow household continue as is. He is a rather ineffectual man, who refuses to exercise his authority as a father and husband.

Rosetta Winslow – Nicholas' spinster sister, Rosetta dotes over her brother and is the de facto authority figure in the house. She spends most of her time in her office, surrounded by photos of dead relatives.

Iris Browne – The family servant, Iris is Hooker's caretaker and principal companion. Having been with the family for roughly thirty years, she was also Gilbert's caretaker when he was a child. She has a complex relationship with these two, while to the rest of the family it seems, she is only the help. This two-layer connection to the family allows her character to transcend the divide between the 'normal' outside world, and the 'crazy' world of the Winslow household.

== Cinema ==
The novel was adapted to the cinema by Laurent Achard who was awarded the Best Director prize at the Locarno International Film Festival in 2006 for that film.
