= Stone Mattress =

2014 short fiction collection by Margaret Atwood

- Author: Margaret Atwood
- Language: English
- Genre: short fiction
- Publisher: McClelland & Stewart
- Publication date: 2014
- Publication place: Canada
- Pages: 288
- ISBN: 978-0-7710-0680-7

Stone Mattress is a 2014 short fiction collection by the Canadian author Margaret Atwood. Atwood describes the pieces in the collection as "tales" rather than short stories, as they draw from the mythical and fantastical aspects associated with fables and fairy tales, rather than from conventional literary realism.

== Contents ==
The nine tales in the collection are:

- Alphinland - Constance Starr, a recent widow, recounts her past as she waits out a winter storm under the direction of her late husband's voice in her mind. Her first love, a poet named Gavin, was a driving force in her creation of the fantastical world of Alphinland. Their relationship is strained when Gavin's poetic muse began to drift from the image of Constance, resulting in her discovering his ongoing affair with Marjorie, a part-time volunteer bookkeeper. Atwood explores the concept of grief and the attitude present in the early 60s as the narration follows the progression of Alphinland in publishing to the eventual downfall of Constance and Gavin's relationship.
- Revenant - Gavin's third wife Reynolds has asked a graduate student, Naveena to study his poetry. But instead Naveena's research is centred around Alphinland rather than Gavin's poetry, and Gavin loses patience with Naveena who leaves. That evening Gavin falls over and cuts his head. Reynolds tries to help him. As he dies he sees a vision of Constance in Alphinland who welcomes him to her, and she is young again.
- Dark Lady - Twins Marjorie and Martin (Jorrie and Tin) live together and Jorrie reads Gavin's obituary. Jorrie remembers her brief affair with Gavin which was discovered by Constance. The twins attend Gavin's funeral at Enoch Turner Schoolhouse in Toronto where they meet Naveena, Reynolds and Constance. Jorrie and Constance forgive each other for the past.
- Lusus Naturae - Means Latin for 'freak of nature' and refers to a woman with a genetic abnormality and who is mistaken for a vampire. Her family accept her disease as a form of punishment and stage her death to enable her sister to marry. The family bribes a priest to arrange for her funeral and pretends that the women has died. The woman lays low locally for a few years until she is discovered and killed.
- The Freeze-Dried Groom - Sam's marriage is over that morning and Gwyneth throws him out. Sam is an 'antique dealer' (furniture enhancer) and heads that morning to a storage unit auction in Mississauga. He wins the unit and finds that it contains a wedding and discovers that the groom has been murdered. The bride then arrives, the cheque was lost in the mail so she was unable to keep the unit and she was delayed by the snow-storm. The bride reveals that the groom died in a sex game and lied her guests that she'd been jilted. She asked Sam to raise the price but Sam tells her that they share the hotel room that night as the storm closes in.
- I Dream of Zenia with the Bright Red Teeth - Charis lives in Parkdale, Toronto and had a relationship with Billy some years ago. Her friend Zenia stole her boyfriend Billy, but Zenia is long dead. Charis has recently acquired a dog called Ouida, and Billy and Charis have rekindled their love. Ouida is a reincarnation of Zenia and bites Billy's genitals and he is rushed to hospital.
- The Dead Hand Loves You - In the early 1960s Jack Dace was trying to write a novel which he was struggling to complete and his three student flat-mates agree to split the story four ways. The characters in it were thinly disguised portraits of his flat-mates. To Jack's surprise the novel is successful, as is the subsequent film and remake, and the contract itself seemed to him as being unfair. Jack checks the whereabouts of the protagonists and decides to consider liquidating them.
- Stone Mattress (The New Yorker, Dec 2011) - Verna has had several husbands, each having died of 'natural causes'. Verna then goes on a cruise to the Arctic and considers the single men among the passengers including several Bobs. But then she sees Bob Goreham who had raped her fifty-odd years ago when she was fourteen. She moved to a home for unwed mothers and the baby was taken away. But Bob does not recognise her and she plans to kill him via a 1.9 billion year old stromatolite.
- Torching the Dusties - Wilma is an elderly widow who suffers from Charles Bonnet syndrome and sees imaginary people. She lives in a retirement home called Ambrosia Manor with her friend Tobias. But demonstrators gather and picket near the entrance and have threatened to burn it down.

"I Dream of Zenia with the Bright Red Teeth" is a sequel story to Atwood's 1993 novel The Robber Bride.

== Reception ==
Sam Baker in The Independent writes "Retribution, strong women, otherworldly happenings – all the Atwood hallmarks are here. What’s new is Atwood’s fierce and fearless take on ageing. But the stars are the triptych of stories that open this collection. “Alphinland”, “Revenant” and “Dark Lady” centre around a distant love triangle from the vantage point of old age. Constance, now the wildly successful writer of the Alphinland fantasies, wreaks her revenge through her writing. Subtle? Maybe not. But they are, without exception, razor sharp, with Atwood’s gimlet eye for the ludicrousness of modern life: HDTV, video games and Twilight-esque vampires all come in for a pasting."

== Film adaptation ==
On May 18, 2022, a film adaptation of Stone Mattress was announced with Julianne Moore and Sandra Oh set to star as Verna and Grace, respectively. Lynne Ramsay will direct from a screenplay she wrote with Tom Townend. StudioCanal, Film4 Productions, John Lesher and JoAnne Sellar will be producing the project, with Amazon Studios distributing in the United States. Filming is scheduled to begin in September 2022 in Greenland and Iceland.
