= Surfacing (film) =

- Directed by: Claude Jutra
- Written by: Bernard Gordon
- Based on: Surfacing by Margaret Atwood
- Produced by: Beryl Fox
- Starring: Kathleen Beller; R. H. Thomson; Joseph Bottoms; Michael Ironside; Margaret Dragu
- Cinematography: Richard Leiterman
- Edited by: Toni Trow
- Music by: Jean Cousineau; Ann Mortifee
- Release date: 23 July 1981 (Canada)
- Running time: 89 minutes
- Country: Canada
- Language: English

Surfacing is a 1981 Canadian drama film directed by Claude Jutra and starring Kathleen Beller, R. H. Thomson, Joseph Bottoms, Michael Ironside and Margaret Dragu. The film was written by Bernard Gordon as an adaptation of Margaret Atwood's novel Surfacing (1972).

The film received mixed reviews, with criticism of Bottoms' performance, and praise for Dragu’s. The film garnered one Genie Award nomination at the 3rd Genie Awards, for songwriter Ann Mortifee in the Best Original Song category.

Atwood's novel was widely considered "unfilmable", and Jutra's adaptation was not considered successful. He had been brought in as director only at the last minute, after original director Eric Till dropped out; it was also the first narrative feature film ever produced by Beryl Fox, who was primarily known as a documentary filmmaker. In addition, the film was criticized for casting Beller and Bottoms, actors from the United States, in a film adaptation of a novel with themes of Canadian nationalism, as well as for giving Bottoms top billing even though Beller's character was the novel's primary protagonist. Jutra rebounded the following year with the more successful and better-received By Design.

== Filming locations ==
The final diving scene was filmed in the Bon Echo Provincial Park area on Mazinaw Lake at Mazinaw Rock in south-eastern Ontario. Nearby, the former Pethicks store/gas station was also used. The river scenes were shot on the Madawaska River near Algonquin Park.

== Cast ==
- Joseph Bottoms as Joe
- Kathleen Beller as Kate
- R.H. Thomson as David
- Michael Ironside as Wayne
