= NZSA Waitangi Day Literary Honours =

The NZSA Waitangi Day Literary Honours were awarded each year to one or more New Zealand writers. They were an initiative of the New Zealand Society of Authors (Pen NZ Inc) Te Puni Kaituhi o Aotearoa and were first given out in 2014. They were last awarded in 2020.

== History ==
The NZSA Waitangi Day Literary Honours were annual awards made by the Board of the New Zealand Society of Authors (Pen NZ Inc) Te Puni Kaituhi o Aotearoa (NZSA) after a call for nominations from NZSA members. They were given to one or more candidates to celebrate and acknowledge literary success, especially on the international stage.

This award, first presented in 2014, was described by NZSA Past-President Kyle Mewburn as “the only literary award bestowed by peers”. 2016 Recipient Anna Smaill said that “It’s a real honour to be recognised in this way by the NZSA” and Selina Tusitala Marsh said in 2017, “Fa’afetai tele lava for this lovely acknowledgment.” Ashleigh Young said in 2018, “I can’t express how much it means to be given such an acknowledgement.”

The awards, announced each year on or around Waitangi Day, were discontinued in 2021. The following year, however, the NZSA acknowledged the work of Laura Jean McKay, but not as an award winner.

== List of winners by year ==
2014: Damien Wilkins, Owen Marshall, Ted Dawe, Martin Edmond

2015: Eleanor Catton, Phillip Mann, Anthony McCarten

2016: Anna Smaill, Paul Cleave

2017: Selina Tusitala Marsh

2018: Ashleigh Young

2019: Lani Wendt Young and Liam McIlvanney

2020: Rachael King and Lee Murray

2021: discontinued

== See also ==
- List of New Zealand literary awards
