= Writing with Intent =

Collection of essays by Margaret Atwood

- Author: Margaret Atwood
- Language: English
- Genre: Literary Collection
- Publisher: Basic Books
- Publication date: March 18, 2005
- ISBN: 9780786715350

Writing with Intent: Essays, Reviews, Personal Prose—1983–2005 (2006) is a collection of essays by the Canadian author Margaret Atwood. The book includes accounts of the author's experiences as a young woman becoming a writer; many reviews of films and books; obituaries, and a long essay criticizing the Iraq War.
