= Two-Headed Poems =

First edition (publ. OUP)

Two-Headed Poems is the eighth book of poems by Canadian author Margaret Atwood. It was first published in 1978.

The title of the collection refers to its central cycle of poems, which concerns a pair of Siamese twins as a metaphor for Canada. The twins dream of separation, and speak sometimes singly, sometimes together within the poems. The tension of their desire for separation and their inescapable connection evokes the French-English tensions in Canada and Quebec separatism. These tensions are also evoked in the image of two deaf singers, an image which implies that neither English-Canada nor Quebec listens to each other. However, the metaphors of Two-Headed Poems can also be interpreted on a more personal level to refer to the tensions between lovers.
