= Moral Disorder =

Book by Margaret Atwood

- First edition cover
- Author: Margaret Atwood
- Language: English
- Genre: short stories
- Publisher: McClelland and Stewart (Canada)
- Publication date: 4 September 2006 (first edition, hardcover)
- Publication place: Canada
- Media type: Print (hardback & paperback)
- ISBN: 0-7475-8162-2
- OCLC: 81772483

Moral Disorder (ISBN 0-7475-8162-2) is a collection of connected short stories by Margaret Atwood. It was first published on 4 September 2006 by McClelland and Stewart. It chronicles the hidden pains of a troubled Canadian family over a 60-year span. All the short stories have the same female main character at different times of her life, except the last one, which is an autobiographical tale.

The book title is taken from the title of the novel that Graeme Gibson was writing in 1996, when he decided to stop writing novels.

== Summary of the stories ==
=== The Bad News ===
The female character reflects on the morning habits of her husband and herself. He rushes into the bedroom to tell her the news from the paper. He is eager to share the burden. But she would rather wait until breakfast. Their behavior has settled into patterns. She feels that they are just waiting for the time when their world will start collapsing. Remembering a vacation to Glanum, she imagines them as ancient Romans, discussing over breakfast the bad news about the Barbarian invasions.

=== The Art of Cooking and Serving ===
The girl is aged 11, and her mother is pregnant with a child. The girl struggles to understand what her mother is experiencing, and resents the lack of household contribution throughout the pregnancy. The young girl works diligently to complete all of the household chores, as well as knitting the baby a layette. With the birth of the baby, the girl begins to rebel against her mother's wishes, ultimately succeeding in her wish to gain more freedom.

=== The Headless Horseman ===
In the present, the main character and her sister talk about the past while driving to visit their mother, whose health is failing. They talk about their youth. When the older sister was thirteen, the baby being two, she made a Halloween costume of the Headless Horseman. Later the baby sister included the severed head in her games. She was always very sensitive and impressionable, coming close, in her teens, to suicidal thoughts. This section particularly explores how her sister goes through several childhood socialisation issues along with health issues, this being failing to sleep amongst many others.

=== My Last Duchess ===
Before her final high-school exam, she studies with her boyfriend Bill. In particular, they analyze the poem My Last Duchess by Robert Browning. It is a monologue by the Duke of Ferrara that implies he may have killed his young wife because "she smiled too much". Bill, whose strength is algebra and exact sciences, can't understand the poem. The main character makes an effort to explain it to him, but finds that she herself is haunted by questions. Her first superficial erotic experiences are contrasted with the dark side hinted at by the poem. She and Bill eventually break up because he accuses her of defending the Duke. There is some truth in the accusation, since she finds the Duchess a "dumb bunny".

=== The Other Place ===
As a young adult, the main character travels a lot, going from job to job as a kind of intellectual nomad. During this time, her friends settle down and have a family. She wonders whether she will always be alone and roaming or will she eventually settle down. Even when the sexual revolution happens and behavior like hers becomes common, she feels different because she has a seriousness that others don't show. At one time, she has an apartment in Vancouver and a similarly lonely friend comes often to visit. He tells her about when his three brothers almost killed him in a cruel joke by locking him in an ice box. Later she marries Tig and lives the settled life she was thinking about. But she often dreams of being in an apartment similar to the one she had in Vancouver and of knowing that a child is locked away dying in one of the rooms. She wonders if the place in her dream represents the past or is a place in her future.

=== Monopoly ===
In this story the narration switches to third person. We learn that the main character is called Nell. She is a free-lance editor and gets a job helping an author, Oona, write a self-help book for women. In a moment of confidence, Oona tells Nell that her marriage with Tig is in crisis and they stay together only for the benefit of their two sons. They have liberal sexual attitudes and Oona selects Nell as Tig's lover. Later Tig moves out of the marriage and rents a farm. Nell goes to visit but is not allowed to stay when the children come. Eventually she has the permission to stay at the farm when they are there but is supposed to take care of them. She plays Monopoly with them and can't help being competitive and beating them. She feels like a concubine or a governess.

=== Moral Disorder ===
Tig and Nell move to a new farm. They start growing vegetables and raising animals, first hens, then peacocks, cows, and sheep. The locals see them as town people ignorant of the country lifestyle, but they also help. One of the new-born lambs need to be fed by hand and kept inside the house. Nell grows attached to it. When the lamb grows up, it doesn't adapt to living with the other sheep and becomes aggressive against Tig out of jealousy for Nell. It has to be put down. Coming back from the slaughterhouse, Nell cries and accuses Tig of not wanting her to have babies.

=== White Horse ===
A friend of Nell rescues an old mistreated mare named Gladys and presses her on Nell and Tig. The friend teaches Nell to take care of her and to ride her. Nell's sister Lizzie comes to visit, especially when she's having one of her crises. A psychiatrist diagnoses her with schizophrenia and gives her pills that make her sluggish and apathetic. He tells Nell that it would be dangerous to reveal her condition to Lizzie. Eventually, they consult a specialist and it turns out that the psychiatrist was a quack and the pills unnecessary and dangerous. Lizzie resents Nell for not telling her about the diagnosis. She becomes energetic again and is fond of running along Gladys. In the meantime, Nell becomes pregnant, but does not tell anybody yet. One night the white mare escapes from the barns, runs into the street, and is killed by a car; Nell feels guilty. In an outlook into the future, the reader learns that Lizzie's crises eventually stop, and that she gets married, and that Nell and Tig move back to the city.

=== The Entities ===
Nell and Tig have sold their farm and went back to live in Toronto. Their real-estate agent, Lillie, is an elderly lady, a survivor of a German concentration camp. With her help they find a nice small house and, later, a larger one. Oona, meanwhile, has become hostile and accuses Tig of being rich and hiding his money to avoid paying her alimony. Her health fails and she is unable to work, having to leave her house. Nell, using a small inheritance, buys a house and allows Oona to live there for a nominal rent to make things easier for all of them. But Oona is still unhappy, her health deteriorates further, so her sons find a small apartment that is more appropriate for her. On the day the house is to be shown to possible buyers, Tig and Oona's children find Oona dead on the floor. The elder son has to break a window to enter; he cuts his leg and bleeds a lot. After this, Lillie is convinced that there is an evil presence in the house. This is later seen as the first sign of Alzheimer's disease. A medium is called and says that some "entities" are entering at the place where the blood was. She makes a charm to move this entry point outside to the garden. Later Nell tells this to the new owners of the house who find it amusing.

=== The Labrador Fiasco ===
Nell visits her parents. Her father has suffered a stroke and has recovered only partially. He used to be very active but now passes his days in inactivity. Nell's mother reads him a book about the doomed Labrador exploration mission of Hubbard and Wallace. He knows the story very well and comments on the mistakes they made. He later has another stroke that takes his short-term memory away. In his mind the predicament of the explorers, trying desperately to find the way back home, combines with his desire to go back "home", that is, the state things were before the strokes.

=== The Boys at the Lab ===
This story is told in first person by the author. She is taking care of her ninety-year-old mother, looking at old photographs, and trying to reconstruct the stories behind them. Her father used to do research in entomology in a log lab in the woods. Among his assistants, collectively called "the boys at the lab", there were two young men called Cam and Ray. Her mother seemed to have a special liking for them. She says that Cam died of an unspecified disease. Another one of the boys came from India. He hadn't realized how rough the conditions would be and came with a tennis racquet and nice clothes. The author tries to imagine what her feelings might have been and tries to give a story to Cam and Ray. Throughout this, the author attempts to relive the memories that her mother had experienced, however her fragile condition (being blind and one ear deaf) means she does not recall these events.
