= Lady Oracle =

Novel by Margaret Atwood

- First edition
- Author: Margaret Atwood
- Language: English
- Publisher: McClelland and Stewart
- Publication date: 1976
- Publication place: Canada
- Media type: Print
- Pages: 376
- ISBN: 978-0-7710-0838-2
- OCLC: 38592400

Lady Oracle is a novel by Margaret Atwood that parodies Gothic romances and fairy tales. It was first published by McClelland and Stewart in 1976.

== Plot summary ==
The novel's protagonist, Joan Foster, is a romance novelist who has spent her life running away from difficult situations. The novel alternates between flashbacks from the past and scenes from the present. Through flashbacks, the reader sees her first as an overweight child whose mother constantly criticizes her, and later, hiding her career, her past as the mistress of a Polish count, and her affair with a performance artist called The Royal Porcupine, from her bipolar husband Arthur.

In the present, she has recently published a volume of feminist poetry which becomes a breakthrough success and is overwhelmed by the pressures of sudden fame. Joan panics after receiving a blackmail attempt from someone who has found out about her secrets. With the help of two acquaintances, she fakes her own death and then flees to Italy.

== Awards ==
The novel was co-winner, with Margaret Gibson's short story collection The Butterfly Ward, of the City of Toronto Book Award in 1977. In 1978, it was the second prize winner, behind Robertson Davies' novel Fifth Business, of the Periodical Distributors of Canada's award for the best fiction published in paperback.
