= 1979 Governor General's Awards =

Canadian literary award

Each winner of the 1979 Governor General's Awards for Literary Merit was selected by a panel of judges administered by the Canada Council for the Arts. The 1979 awards were the first for which a shortlist of finalists was released a month before the presentation of the awards.

== English ==
Category	Winner	Nominated
Fiction	Jack Hodgins, The Resurrection of Joseph Bourne	Margaret Atwood, Life Before Man; Matt Cohen, The Sweet Second Summer of Kitty Malone
Non-fiction	Maria Tippett, Emily Carr	Robert Bothwell and William Kilbourn, C.D. Howe; Larry Pratt and John Richards, Prairie Capitalism
Poetry or drama	Michael Ondaatje, There's a Trick with a Knife I'm Learning to Do	Erín Moure, Empire, York Street; Susan Musgrave, A Man to Marry, a Man to Bury

== French ==
Category	Winner	Nominated
Fiction	Marie-Claire Blais, Le Sourd dans la ville	Suzanne Jacob, La Survie; Suzanne Paradis, Miss Charlie
Non-fiction	Dominique Clift and Sheila McLeod Arnopoulos, Le fait anglais au Québec	Daniel Latouche, Une société de l'ambiguïté; Pierre Nepveu, Les mots à l'écoute
Poetry or drama	Robert Melançon, Peinture aveugle	Marcel Bélanger, Migrations; André Roy, Les passions du samedi
