= Book of Lives: A Memoir of Sorts =

2025 memoir by Margaret Atwood

- First edition
- Author: Margaret Atwood
- Language: English
- Genre: Memoir
- Publisher: McClelland & Stewart
- Publication date: November 2025
- Publication place: Canada
- Media type: Print (Hardcover, Paperback)
- Pages: 599
- ISBN: 9780771096433

Book of Lives: A Memoir of Sorts is a 2025 memoir by Margaret Atwood. It was published by McClelland & Stewart in November 2025. It is 599 pages in length.

The book received enthusiastic reviews. Writing in The Guardian, Blake Morrison praised Atwood's "many selves she unveils here in a "blizzard" of memories and photos: nerdy brainiac, waifish poet, Medusa-eyed feminist, uncanny prophet and one of the great novelists of our time". Dwight Garner's review in The New York Times noted Atwood's two "topics that overlap like the circles in a Venn diagram"; her love of nature and her interest in "tarot cards, palm readings, exorcisms, ghost sightings and horoscopes". He describes the book as a "a vessel of wrath — and wrath is interesting".
