= Power Politics (poetry collection) =

1971 poetry collection by Margaret Atwood

- First edition
- Author: Margaret Atwood
- Language: English
- Publication date: 1971
- Publication place: US
- Media type: Print

Power Politics is a book of poetry by Canadian author Margaret Atwood, published in 1971.

It contains her famous simile:

You fit into me

like a hook into an eye

a fish hook

an open eye

The violent surprise of this poem is typical of Atwood’s imagery.

Gender is a crucial theme in Power Politics. The collection was often dismissed as a poetic version of Women's Lib although Atwood herself rejected the notion that the Women's Movement influenced the conception of Power Politics.
