= Surfacing (novel) =

1972 novel by Margaret Atwood

- First edition
- Author: Margaret Atwood
- Language: English
- Publisher: McClelland and Stewart
- Publication date: 1972
- Publication place: Canada
- Media type: Print (Hardcover, Paperback)
- ISBN: 0-7710-0822-8

Surfacing is a novel by Canadian author Margaret Atwood. Published by McClelland and Stewart in 1972, it was her second novel. Surfacing has been described by commentators as a companion novel to Atwood's collection of poems, Power Politics, which was written the previous year and deals with complementary issues.

The novel, grappling with notions of national and gendered identity, anticipated rising concerns about conservation and preservation and the emergence of Canadian nationalism. It was adapted into a movie in 1981.

== Plot ==
The book tells the story of a woman who returns to her hometown in Canada to find her missing father. Accompanied by her lover, Joe, and a married couple, Anna and David, the unnamed protagonist meets her past in her childhood house, recalling events and feelings, while trying to find clues to her father's mysterious disappearance. Little by little, the past overtakes her and drives her into the realm of wildness and madness.

== Themes ==
=== Separation ===
Separation is a major theme of Surfacing. This is established in the first chapter, when the narrator is shown to be politically dispossessed as an English-speaker in Quebec, at a time in which Quebec was aspiring to become an independent French-speaking nation. The narrator also feels disconnected from the people around her, equating human interaction with that of animals. For example, while overhearing David and Anna have sex, the narrator thinks "of an animal at the moment the trap closes".

The mouthpiece for feelings of nationalism is extremist David, who claims Canada would be better without the "fascist pig Yanks" and suggests they be driven from the country by attack beavers.

=== Feminism ===
Feminism, a theme in many of Atwood's novels, is explored through the perspective of the female narrative, exposing the ways women are marginalized in their professional and private lives.

== Allusions to other works ==
Surfacing echoes the structure of Jack Kerouac's On the Road, as the narrator travels by car back to her childhood home. The novel has also been compared to Sylvia Plath's The Bell Jar. Atwood's unnamed narrator and Plath's Esther Greenwood are both driven to psychological breakdowns due to their unwillingness to adhere to the social expectations imposed on women.

== Reception and reviews ==
In her essay Margaret Atwood: Beyond Victimhood, Marge Piercy was skeptical of the narrator's abrupt declaration of love for Joe at the end of the novel, saying it did not stop the narrator from being a victim: by choosing a man who opts to be a loser, "how does she stop being a loser?"

== Sources ==
- Cooke, Nathalie (2004). Margaret Atwood: A Critical Companion. Westport, CT: Greenwood Press. ISBN 0-313-32806-4.
