= You Are Happy =

Poem collection by Margaret Atwood

- First edition
- Author: Margaret Atwood
- Language: English
- Subject: Poetry
- Published: 1974 (Oxford University Press)
- Publication place: Canada
- Media type: Print (hardback)
- Pages: 96
- ISBN: 9780195402230
- OCLC: 1160255

You Are Happy is a 1974 collection of poems by Canadian writer Margaret Atwood.

== Contents ==
The book contains the following poems:

=== You Are Happy ===
- Newsreel: man and firing squad
- Useless
- Memory
- Chaos poem
- Gothic letter on a hot night
- November
- Repent
- Digging
- How
- Spring poem
- Tricks with mirrors
- You are happy

=== Songs of the transformed ===
- Pig song
- Bull song
- Rat song
- Crow song
- Song of the worms
- Owl song
- Siren song
- Song of the fox
- Song of the hen's head
- Corpse song

=== Circe/Mud Poems ===
• Composed of 24 unnamed poems

=== There is only one of everything ===
- Eating fire
- Four auguries
- Head against white
- There is only one of everything
- Late August
- Book of ancestors

== Reception ==
A poetry review in The New York Times called "Songs of the transformed" "a splendid series of animal poems ... [able] to capture the natural world and yet to manage to make a larger statement.", and Manijeh Mannani of Athabasca University found that it "continue[s] the same thread of feminist concerns [of her previous poetry] with only the concluding poems of the collection reflecting the optimistic connotation inherent in the title."

You Are Happy has also been discussed by Poetry.
