= Margaret Atwood =

Canadian writer (born 1939)

Margaret Atwood CC OOnt CH FRSC FRSL
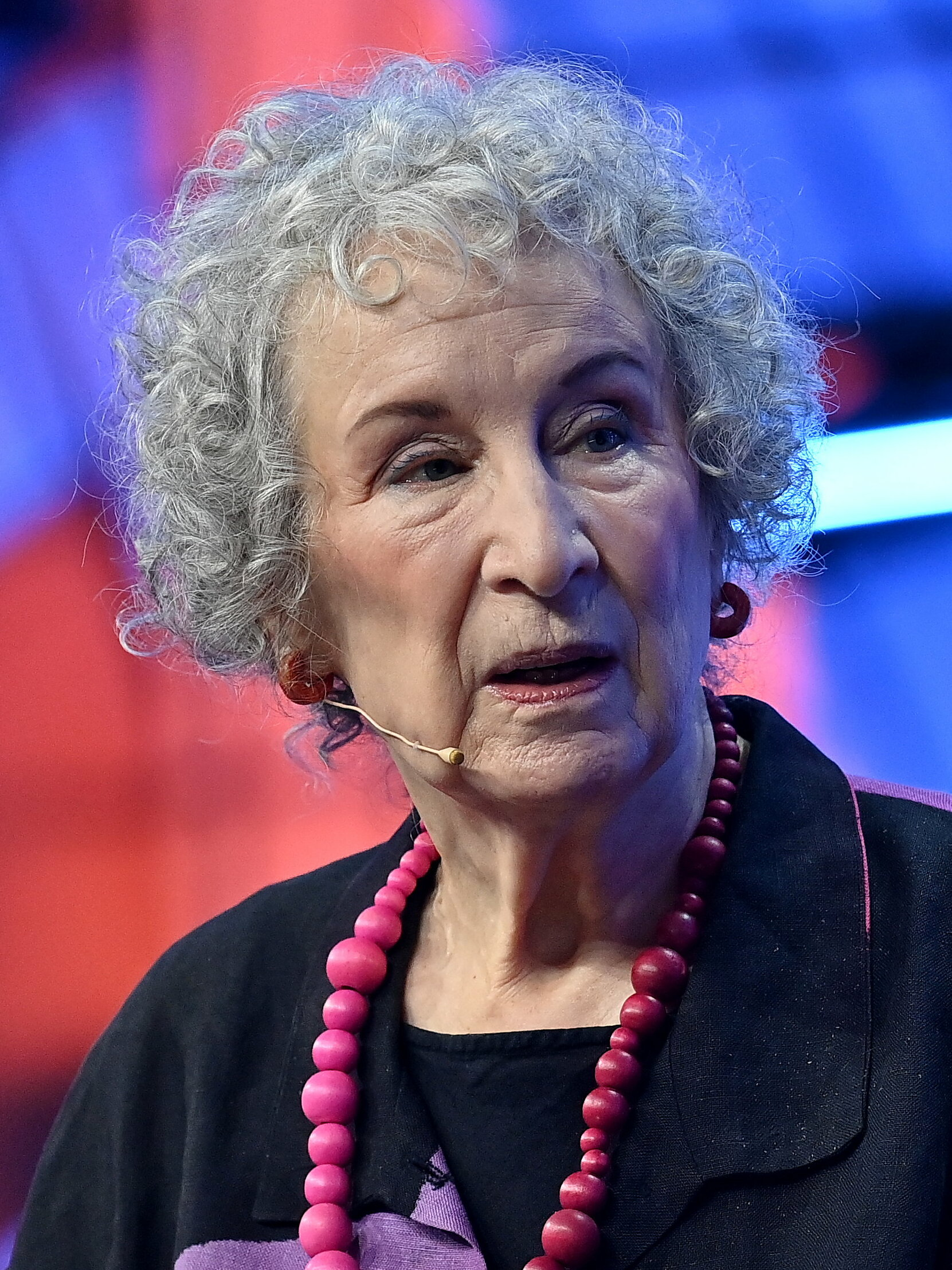
- Atwood in 2022
- Born: Margaret Eleanor Atwood; November 18, 1939 (age 87); Ottawa, Ontario, Canada
- Education: University of Toronto (BA); Radcliffe College (MA)
- Occupation: Writer
- Spouse: Jim Polk (m. 1968; div. 1973)
- Partner: Graeme Gibson (1973–2019; his death)
- Children: 1
- Writing career
- Period: 1961–present
- Genres: Historical fiction; speculative fiction; climate fiction; dystopian fiction
- Notable works: Surfacing (1972); The Handmaid's Tale (1985); Cat's Eye (1988); Alias Grace (1996); The Blind Assassin (2000); Oryx and Crake (2003); The Testaments (2019); The Robber Bride (1993)
- Atwood's voice From BBC Radio 4's Front Row, July 24, 2007
- Website: margaretatwood.ca

Margaret Eleanor Atwood (born November 18, 1939) is a Canadian novelist, poet, literary critic, and inventor. Since 1961, she has published 18 books of poetry, 18 novels, 11 books of nonfiction, nine collections of short fiction, eight children's books, two graphic novels, and a number of small press editions of both poetry and fiction. Her best-known work is the 1985 dystopian novel The Handmaid's Tale. Atwood has won numerous awards and honors for her writing, including two Booker Prizes, the Arthur C. Clarke Award, the Order of Canada, the Franz Kafka Prize, the Prince of Asturias Award for literature, and the National Book Critics and PEN Center USA Lifetime Achievement Awards. A number of her works have been adapted for film and television.

Atwood's works encompass a variety of themes including gender and Canadian identity, religion and myth, the power of language, climate change, genetic engineering, and power politics. Many of her poems are inspired by myths and fairy tales which interested her from a very early age.

Atwood is a founder of the Griffin Poetry Prize and the Writers' Trust of Canada. She is also a Senior Fellow of Massey College, Toronto. She is the inventor of the LongPen device and associated technologies that facilitate remote robotic writing of documents.

== Biography ==
=== Early life and education ===
Atwood was born on November 18, 1939, in Ottawa, Ontario, the second of three children of Carl Edmund Atwood, an entomologist, and Margaret Dorothy (née Killam), a former dietitian and nutritionist from Woodville, Nova Scotia. Because of her father's research in forest entomology, Atwood spent much of her childhood in the backwoods of northern Quebec, and travelling back and forth between Ottawa, Sault Ste. Marie and Toronto.

She did not attend school full-time until she was 12 years old. She became a voracious reader of literature, Dell pocketbook mysteries, Grimms' Fairy Tales, Canadian animal stories, and comic books. She attended Leaside High School in Leaside, Toronto, and graduated in 1957. Atwood began writing plays and poems at the age of 6.

As a child, she also participated in the Brownie program of Girl Guides of Canada. Atwood has written about her experiences in Girl Guides in several of her publications.

Atwood realized she wanted to write professionally when she was 16. In 1957, she began studying at Victoria College in the University of Toronto, where she published poems and articles in Acta Victoriana, the college literary journal, and participated in the sophomore theatrical tradition of The Bob Revue. Her professors included Jay Macpherson and Northrop Frye. She graduated in 1961 with a Bachelor of Arts in English (honours) and minors in philosophy and French.

In 1961, Atwood began graduate studies at Radcliffe College of Harvard University, with a Woodrow Wilson fellowship. She obtained a master's degree (MA) from Radcliffe in 1962 and pursued doctoral studies for two years, but did not finish her dissertation, The English Metaphysical Romance.

=== Literary career ===
==== Early poetry and Fiction (1960s-70s) ====
Atwood's first book of poetry, Double Persephone, was published as a pamphlet by John Robert Colombo's Hawkshead Press in 1961, and won the E. J. Pratt Medal. While continuing to write, Atwood was a lecturer in English at the University of British Columbia, Vancouver, from 1964 to 1965, Instructor in English at the Sir George Williams University in Montreal from 1967 to 1968, and taught at the University of Alberta in Edmonton from 1969 to 1970. In 1966, The Circle Game was published, winning the Governor General's Award. This collection was followed by three other small press collections of poetry: Kaleidoscopes Baroque: a poem, Cranbrook Academy of Art (1965); Talismans for Children, Cranbrook Academy of Art (1965); and Speeches for Doctor Frankenstein, Cranbrook Academy of Art (1966); as well as The Animals in That Country (1968). Atwood's first novel, The Edible Woman, was published in 1969. As a social satire of North American consumerism, many critics have often cited the novel as an early example of the feminist concerns found in many of Atwood's works.

Atwood taught at York University in Toronto from 1971 to 1972 and was a writer in residence at the University of Toronto during the 1972/1973 academic year. Atwood published six collections of poetry over the course of the decade: The Journals of Susanna Moodie (1970), Procedures for Underground (1970), Power Politics (1971), You Are Happy (1974), Selected Poems 1965–1975 (1976), and Two-Headed Poems (1978). Atwood also published three novels during this time: Surfacing (1972); Lady Oracle (1976); and Life Before Man (1979), which was a finalist for the Governor General's Award. Surfacing, Lady Oracle, and Life Before Man, like The Edible Woman, explore identity and social constructions of gender as they relate to topics such as nationhood and sexual politics. In particular, Surfacing, along with her first non-fiction monograph, Survival: A Thematic Guide to Canadian Literature (1972), helped establish Atwood as an important and emerging voice in Canadian literature. In 1977 Atwood published her first short story collection, Dancing Girls, which was the winner of the St. Lawrence Award for Fiction and the award of The Periodical Distributors of Canada for Short Fiction.

By 1976, there was such interest in Atwood, her works, and her life that Maclean's declared her to be "Canada's most gossiped-about writer."

==== Literary breakthrough (1980s-90s) ====
Atwood's literary reputation continued to rise in the 1980s with the publication of Bodily Harm (1981); The Handmaid's Tale (1985), winner of the Arthur C. Clarke Award and 1985 Governor General's Award and finalist for the 1986 Booker Prize; and Cat's Eye (1988), finalist for both the 1988 Governor General's Award and the 1989 Booker Prize. Despite her distaste for literary labels, Atwood has since conceded to referring to The Handmaid's Tale as a work of science fiction or, more precisely, speculative fiction. As she has repeatedly noted, "There's a precedent in real life for everything in the book. I decided not to put anything in that somebody somewhere hadn't already done."

While reviewers and critics have been tempted to read autobiographical elements of Atwood's life in her work, particularly Cat's Eye, in general Atwood resists the desire of critics to read too closely for an author's life in their writing. Filmmaker Michael Rubbo's Margaret Atwood: Once in August (1984) details the filmmaker's frustration in uncovering autobiographical evidence and inspiration in Atwood's works.

During the 1980s, Atwood continued to teach, serving as the MFA Honorary Chair at the University of Alabama in Tuscaloosa, 1985; the Berg Professor of English, New York University, 1986; Writer-in-Residence, Macquarie University, Australia, 1987; and Writer-in-Residence, Trinity University, San Antonio, Texas, 1989. Regarding her stints with teaching, she has noted, "Success for me meant no longer having to teach at university."

Atwood's reputation as a writer continued to grow with the publication of the novels The Robber Bride (1993), finalist for the 1994 Governor General's Award and shortlisted for the James Tiptree Jr. Award, and Alias Grace (1996), winner of the 1996 Giller Prize, finalist for the 1996 Booker Prize, finalist for the 1996 Governor General's Award, and shortlisted for the 1997 Orange Prize for Fiction. Although vastly different in context and form, both novels use female characters to question good and evil and morality through their portrayal of female villains. As Atwood noted about The Robber Bride, "I'm not making a case for evil behaviour, but unless you have some women characters portrayed as evil characters, you're not playing with a full range." The Robber Bride takes place in contemporary Toronto, while Alias Grace is a work of historical fiction detailing the 1843 murders of Thomas Kinnear and his housekeeper Nancy Montgomery. That same year, 1997, she was even ranked fifth in the piece, The Canadian 100: The 100 Most Influential Canadians of the Twentieth Century, published by two Canadian historians.

Atwood had previously written the 1974 CBC made-for-TV film The Servant Girl, about the life of Grace Marks, the young servant who, along with James McDermott, was convicted of the crime. Atwood continued her poetry contributions by publishing Snake Woman in 1999 for the Women's Literature journal Kalliope.

==== International recognition (2000s-10s) ====
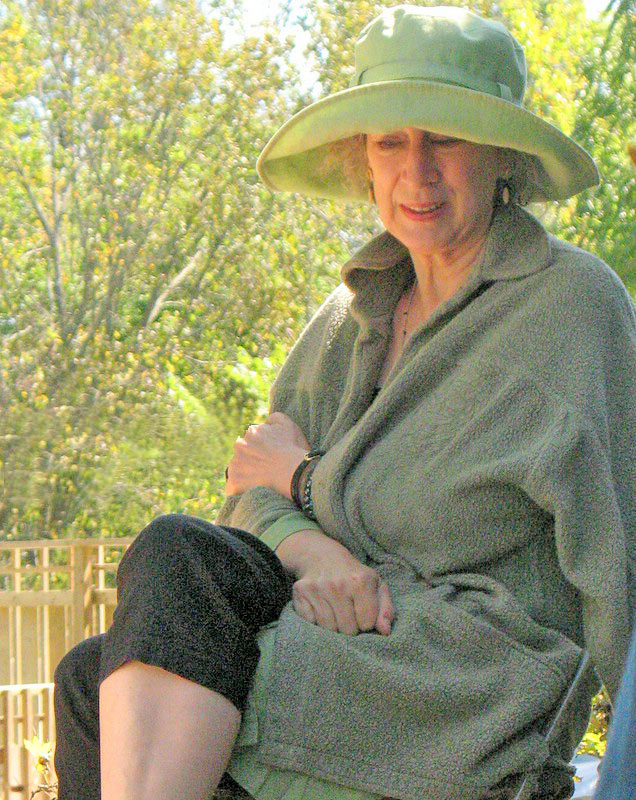
Atwood attending a reading at the Eden Mills Writers' Festival in September 2006

In 2000, Atwood published her tenth novel, The Blind Assassin, to critical acclaim, winning both the Booker Prize and the Hammett Prize in 2000. The Blind Assassin was also nominated for the Governor General's Award in 2000, Orange Prize for Fiction, and the International Dublin Literary Award in 2002. In 2001, Atwood was inducted into Canada's Walk of Fame.

Atwood followed this success with the publication of Oryx and Crake in 2003, the first novel in a series that also includes The Year of the Flood (2009) and MaddAddam (2013), which would collectively come to be known as the MaddAddam Trilogy. The apocalyptic vision in the MaddAddam Trilogy engages themes of genetic modification, pharmaceutical and corporate control, and man-made disaster. As a work of speculative fiction, Atwood notes of the technology in Oryx and Crake, "I think, for the first time in human history, we see where we might go. We can see far enough into the future to know that we can't go on the way we've been going forever without inventing, possibly, a lot of new and different things." She later cautions in the acknowledgements to MaddAddam, "Although MaddAddam is a work of fiction, it does not include any technologies or bio-beings that do not already exist, are not under construction or are not possible in theory."

In 2005, Atwood published the novella The Penelopiad as part of the Canongate Myth Series. The story is a retelling of The Odyssey from the perspective of Penelope and a chorus of the twelve maids murdered at the end of the original tale. The Penelopiad was given a theatrical production in 2007.

In 2016, Atwood published the novel Hag-Seed, a modern-day retelling of Shakespeare's The Tempest, as part of Penguin Random House's Hogarth Shakespeare Series.

On November 28, 2018, Atwood announced that she would publish The Testaments, a sequel to The Handmaid's Tale, in September 2019. The novel features three female narrators and takes place fifteen years after the character Offred's final scene in The Handmaid's Tale. The book was the joint winner of the 2019 Booker Prize.

In 2008, Atwood published Payback: Debt and the Shadow Side of Wealth, a collection of five lectures delivered as part of the Massey Lectures from October 12 to November 1, 2008. The book was released in anticipation of the lectures, which were also recorded and broadcast on CBC Radio One's Ideas.

In March 2008, Atwood accepted a chamber opera commission. Commissioned by City Opera of Vancouver, Pauline is set in Vancouver in March 1913 during the final days of the life of Canadian writer and performer Pauline Johnson. Pauline, composed by Tobin Stokes with libretto by Atwood, premiered on May 23, 2014, at Vancouver's York Theatre.

In 2016, Atwood began writing the superhero comic book series Angel Catbird, with co-creator and illustrator Johnnie Christmas. The series protagonist, scientist Strig Feleedus, is victim of an accidental mutation that leaves him with the body parts and powers of both a cat and a bird. As with her other works, Atwood notes of the series, "The kind of speculative fiction about the future that I write is always based on things that are in process right now. So it's not that I imagine them, it's that I notice that people are working on them and I take it a few steps further down the road. So it doesn't come out of nowhere, it comes out of real life."

With her novel Scribbler Moon, Atwood is the first contributor to Future Library. The work, completed in 2015, was ceremonially handed over to the project on May 27 of the same year. The book will be held by the project until its eventual publishing in 2114. She thinks that readers will probably need a paleo-anthropologist to translate some parts of her story. In an interview with the Guardian newspaper, Atwood said, "There's something magical about it. It's like Sleeping Beauty. The texts are going to slumber for 100 years and then they'll wake up, come to life again. It's a fairytale length of time. She slept for 100 years."

In early 2004, while on the paperback tour in Denver for her novel Oryx and Crake, Atwood conceived the concept of a remote robotic writing technology, what would later be known as the LongPen, that would enable a person to remotely write in ink anywhere in the world via tablet PC and the Internet, thus allowing her to conduct her book tours without being physically present. She quickly founded a company, Unotchit Inc., to develop, produce and distribute this technology. By 2011, the company shifted its market focus into business and legal transactions and was producing a range of products, for a variety of remote writing applications, based on the LongPen technologies. In 2013, the company renamed itself to Syngrafii Inc. In 2021, it is cloud-based and offers electronic signature technology. As of May 2021, Atwood is still a director of Syngrafii Inc. and holder of various patents related to the LongPen and related technology.

===== Later career (2020s) =====
In November 2020 Atwood published Dearly, a collection of poems exploring absences and endings, ageing and retrospection, and gifts and renewals. The central poem, Dearly, was also published in The Guardian newspaper along with an essay exploring the passing of time, grief, and how a poem belongs to the reader; this is accompanied by an audio recording of Atwood reading the poem on the newspaper's website.

In 2025, to mixed reviews, Atwood published Book of Lives: A Memoir of Sorts.

== Recurring themes and cultural contexts ==
=== Theory of Canadian identity ===
Atwood's contributions to the theorizing of Canadian identity have garnered attention both in Canada and internationally. Her principal work of literary criticism, Survival: A Thematic Guide to Canadian Literature (1972), has not been updated and revised, but nevertheless remains a standard introduction to Canadian literature in Canadian studies programs internationally. Writer and academic Joseph Pivato has criticised the continued reprinting of Survival by Anansi Press as a view-narrowing disservice to students of Canadian literature.

In Survival, Atwood postulates that Canadian literature, and by extension Canadian identity, is characterized by the symbol of survival. This symbol is expressed in the omnipresent use of "victim positions" in Canadian literature. These positions represent a scale of self-consciousness and self-actualization for the victim in the "victor/victim" relationship. The "victor" in these scenarios may be other humans, nature, the wilderness or other external and internal factors which oppress the victim. Atwood's Survival bears the influence of Northrop Frye's theory of garrison mentality; Atwood uses Frye's concept of Canada's desire to wall itself off from outside influence as a critical tool to analyze Canadian literature. According to her theories in works such as Survival and her exploration of similar themes in her fiction, Atwood considers Canadian literature as the expression of Canadian identity. According to this literature, Canadian identity has been defined by a fear of nature, by settler history, and by unquestioned adherence to the community. In an interview with the Scottish critic Bill Findlay in 1979, Atwood discussed the relationship of Canadian writers and writing to the 'Imperial Cultures' of America and Britain.

Atwood's contribution to the theorizing of Canada is not limited to her non-fiction works. Several of her works, including The Journals of Susanna Moodie, Alias Grace, The Blind Assassin and Surfacing, are examples of what postmodern literary theorist Linda Hutcheon calls "historiographic metafiction". In such works, Atwood explicitly explores the relation of history and narrative and the processes of creating history.

Among her contributions to Canadian literature, Atwood is a founding trustee of the Griffin Poetry Prize, as well as a founder of the Writers' Trust of Canada, a non-profit literary organization that seeks to encourage Canada's writing community.

=== Feminism ===
Atwood's work has been of interest to feminist literary critics, despite Atwood's unwillingness at times to apply the label 'feminist' to her works. Starting with the publication of her first novel, The Edible Woman, Atwood asserted, "I don't consider it feminism; I just consider it social realism."

Despite her rejection of the label at times, critics have analyzed the sexual politics, use of myth and fairytale, and gendered relationships in Atwood's work through the lens of feminism. Before the 1985 publication of The Handmaid's Tale, Atwood gave an interview to feminist theorist Elizabeth Meese in which she defined feminism as a "belief in the rights of women" and averred that "if practical, hardline, anti-male feminists took over and became the government, I would resist them." In 2017, she clarified her discomfort with the label feminism by stating, "I always want to know what people mean by that word [feminism]. Some people mean it quite negatively, other people mean it very positively, some people mean it in a broad sense, other people mean it in a more specific sense. Therefore, in order to answer the question, you have to ask the person what they mean." Speaking to The Guardian, she said "For instance, some feminists have historically been against lipstick and letting transgender women into women's washrooms. Those are not positions I have agreed with", a position she repeated to The Irish Times. In an interview with Penguin Books, Atwood stated that the driving question throughout her writing of The Handmaid's Tale was "If you were going to shove women back into the home and deprive them of all of these gains that they thought they had made, how would you do it?", but related this question to totalitarianism, not feminism.

In January 2018, Atwood penned the op-ed "Am I a Bad Feminist?" for The Globe and Mail. The piece was in response to social media backlash related to Atwood's signature on a 2016 petition calling for an independent investigation into the firing of Steven Galloway, a former University of British Columbia professor accused of sexual harassment and assault by a student. While feminist critics denounced Atwood for her support of Galloway, Atwood asserted that her signature was in support of due process in the legal system. She has been criticized for her comments surrounding the #MeToo movement, particularly that it is a "symptom of a broken legal system".

In 2018, following a partnership between Hulu's adaptation of The Handmaid's Tale and women's rights organisation Equality Now, Atwood was honored at their 2018 Make Equality Reality Gala. In her acceptance speech she said:

I am, of course, not a real activist—I'm simply a writer without a job who is frequently asked to speak about subjects that would get people with jobs fired if they themselves spoke. You, however, at Equality Now are real activists. I hope people will give Equality Now lots and lots of money, today, so they can write equal laws, enact equal laws and see that equal laws are implemented. That way, in time, all girls may be able to grow up believing that there are no avenues that are closed to them simply because they are girls.

In 2019, Atwood partnered with Equality Now for the release of The Testaments.

=== Speculative and science fiction ===
Atwood has resisted the suggestion that The Handmaid's Tale and Oryx and Crake are science fiction, suggesting to The Guardian in 2003 that they are speculative fiction: "Science fiction has monsters and spaceships; speculative fiction could really happen." She told the Book of the Month Club: "Oryx and Crake is a speculative fiction, not a science fiction proper. It contains no intergalactic space travel, no teleportation, no Martians." On BBC Breakfast, she explained that science fiction, as opposed to what she herself wrote, was "talking squids in outer space." The latter phrase particularly rankled advocates of science fiction and frequently recurs when her writing is discussed.

In 2005, Atwood said that she did at times write social science fiction and that The Handmaid's Tale and Oryx and Crake could be designated as such. She clarified her meaning on the difference between speculative and science fiction, admitting that others used the terms interchangeably: "For me, the science fiction label belongs on books with things in them that we can't yet do ... Speculative fiction means a work that employs the means already to hand and that takes place on Planet Earth." She said that science fiction narratives give a writer the ability to explore themes in ways that realistic fiction cannot.

Atwood further clarified her definitions of terms in 2011, in a discussion with science fiction author Ursula K. Le Guin: "What Le Guin means by 'science fiction' is what I mean by 'speculative fiction', and what she means by 'fantasy' would include what I mean by 'science fiction'." She added that genre borders were increasingly fluid, and that all forms of "SF" might be placed under a common umbrella.

=== Animal rights ===
Atwood repeatedly makes observations about the relationships of humans to animals in her works. A large portion of the dystopia Atwood creates in Oryx and Crake concerns the genetic modification and alteration of animals and humans, resulting in hybrids such as pigoons, rakunks, wolvogs and Crakers, raising questions on the limits and ethics of science and technology, and on what it means to be human.

In Surfacing, one character remarks about eating animals: "The animals die that we may live, they are substitute people ... And we eat them, out of cans or otherwise; we are eaters of death, dead Christ-flesh resurrecting inside us, granting us life." Some characters in her books link sexual oppression to meat-eating and consequently give up meat-eating. In The Edible Woman, Atwood's character Marian identifies with hunted animals and cries after hearing her fiancé's experience of hunting and eviscerating a rabbit. Marian stops eating meat but then later returns to it.

In Cat's Eye, the narrator recognizes the similarity between a turkey and a baby. She looks at "the turkey, which resembles a trussed, headless baby. It has thrown off its disguise as a meal and has revealed itself to me for what it is, a large dead bird." In Atwood's Surfacing, a dead heron represents purposeless killing and prompts thoughts about other senseless deaths.

Atwood is a pescetarian. In a 2009 interview she stated that "I shouldn't use the term vegetarian because I'm allowing myself gastropods, crustaceans and the occasional fish. Nothing with fur or feathers though".

=== Political involvement ===
Atwood has indicated in an interview that she considers herself a Red Tory in what she sees as the historical sense of the term, saying that "The Tories were the ones who believed that those in power had a responsibility to the community, that money should not be the measure of all things." She has also stated on Twitter that she is a monarchist. In the 2008 federal election, she attended a rally for the Bloc Québécois, a Quebec pro-independence party, because of her support for their position on the arts; she said she would vote for the party if she lived in Quebec, and that the choice was between the Bloc and the Conservatives. In an editorial in The Globe and Mail, she urged Canadians to vote for any party other than the Conservatives to prevent them gaining a majority.

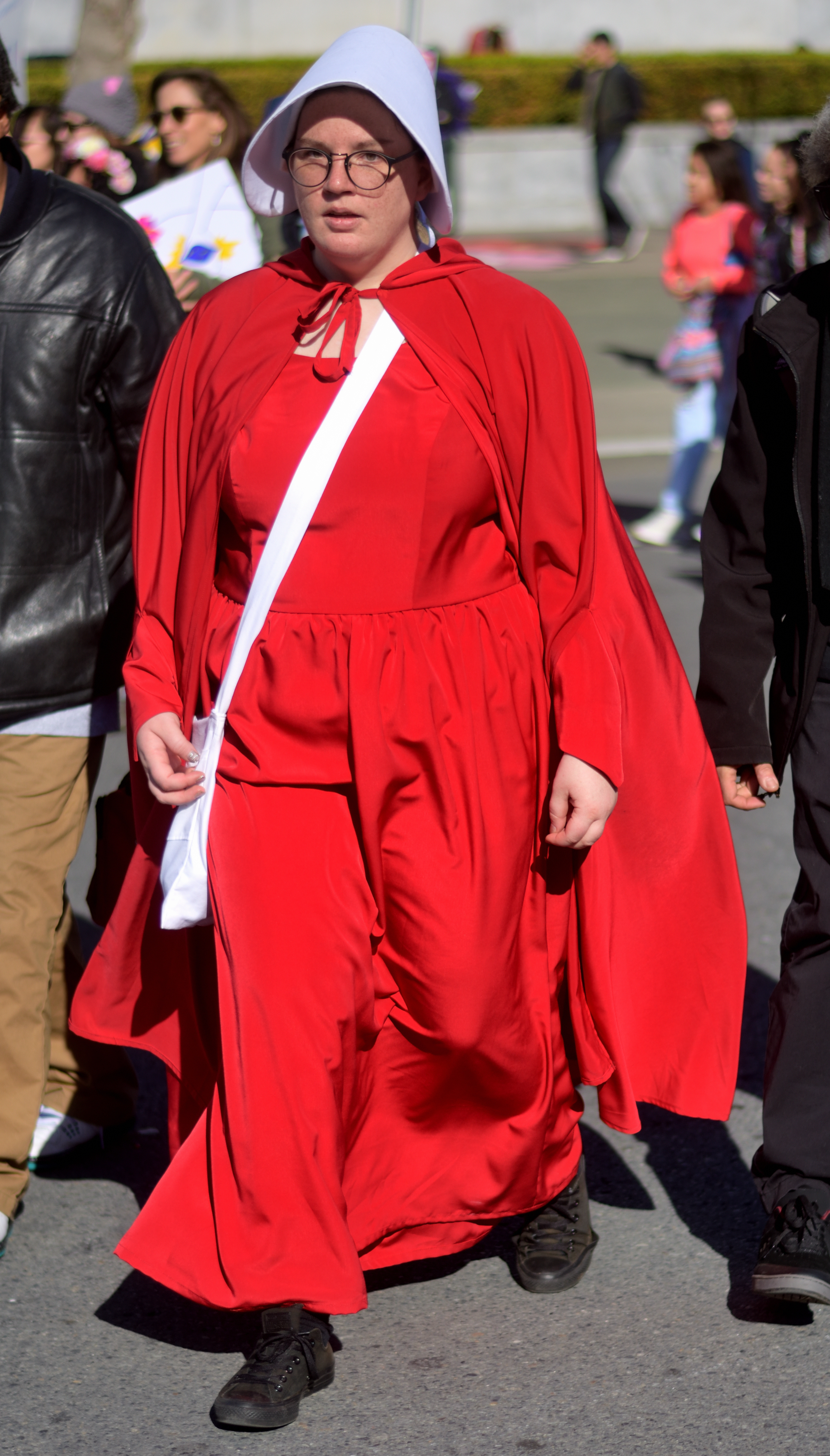
A member of the political action group The Handmaid Coalition

Atwood has strong views on environmental issues, and she and Graeme Gibson were the joint honorary presidents of the Rare Bird Club within BirdLife International. Atwood celebrated her 70th birthday at a gala dinner at Laurentian University in Sudbury, Ontario. She stated that she had chosen to attend the event because the city has been home to one of Canada's most ambitious environmental reclamation programs: "When people ask if there's hope (for the environment), I say, if Sudbury can do it, so can you. Having been a symbol of desolation, it's become a symbol of hope." Atwood has been chair of the Writers' Union of Canada and helped to found the Canadian English-speaking chapter of PEN International, a group originally started to free politically imprisoned writers. She held the position of PEN Canada president in the mid-1980s and was the 2017 recipient of the PEN Center USA's Lifetime Achievement Award. Despite calls for a boycott by Gazan students, Atwood visited Israel and accepted the $1,000,000 Dan David Prize along with Indian author Amitav Ghosh at Tel Aviv University in May 2010. Atwood commented that "we don't do cultural boycotts."

Her dystopian novel The Handmaid's Tale (1985), takes place in what once was Harvard Yard and vicinity near Boston;, now known as Gilead, while Canada is portrayed as the only hope for an escape. To some this reflects her status of being "in the vanguard of Canadian anti-Americanism of the 1960s and 1970s". Critics have seen the mistreated Handmaid as Canada. During the debate in 1987 over a free-trade agreement between Canada and the United States, Atwood spoke out against the deal and wrote an essay opposing it. She said that the 2016 United States presidential election led to an increase in sales of The Handmaid's Tale. Amazon reported that The Handmaid's Tale was the most-read book of 2017. The Handmaid's Tale sequel, The Testaments, also saw a rapid increase of sales immediately following the 2024 United States presidential election, with The Handmaid's Tale reaching third in Amazon's bestseller's list. Following this election, Atwood wrote on X, "Despair is not an option. It helps no one."

== TV cameos ==
In 2017, Atwood had a cameo appearance in the pilot episode of The Handmaid's Tale (TV Series) as an Aunt figure who slaps Offred.

In 2024, Atwood had a cameo in a season 17 episode of Murdoch Mysteries as Lorin Quinelle, an amateur ornithologist.

In 2026, Atwood had a cameo in season 1 episode 10 of The Testaments. She played a prison guard.

== Reception ==
In 2024 the Republican-dominated Utah Legislature passed a law mandating the removal of books deemed objectionable from all Utah public schools. On August 2, 2024, the Utah State School Board released its first list of objectionable books. One book on this list was penned by Atwood (Oryx and Crake).

== Activism ==
In 2018, Atwood signed an appeal of the American PEN Center in defense of Ukrainian director Oleg Sentsov, a political prisoner in Russia.

In July 2020, Atwood was one of the 153 signers of the "Harper's Letter" (also known as "A Letter on Justice and Open Debate") that expressed concern that "the free exchange of information and ideas, the lifeblood of a liberal society, is daily becoming more constricted."

On February 24, 2022, Atwood briefly covered the war in Ukraine at the time of the Russian invasion of Ukraine, and published a link to the state aid fund on Twitter. She continues to publish information about the war in Ukraine on the social network.

In 2025, Atwood was among 200 cultural figures signing a letter calling for the release of jailed Palestinian leader Marwan Barghouti.

== Adaptations ==
Atwood's novel Surfacing (1972) was adapted into a 1981 film of the same name written by Bernard Gordon and directed by Claude Jutra. It received poor reviews; one reviewer wrote that it made "little attempt to find cinematic equivalents for the admittedly difficult subjective and poetic dimensions of the novel."

Atwood's novel The Handmaid's Tale (1985) has been adapted several times. A 1990 film, directed by Volker Schlöndorff, with a screenplay by Harold Pinter, received mixed reviews. A musical adaptation resulted in the 2000 opera, written by Poul Ruders, with a libretto by Paul Bentley. It premiered at the Royal Danish Opera in 2000, and was staged in 2003 at London's English National Opera and the Minnesota Opera. Boston Lyric Opera mounted a production in May 2019, described by The New York Times as "a triumph". A television series by Bruce Miller began airing on the streaming service Hulu in 2017. The first season of the show earned eight Emmys in 2017, including Outstanding Drama Series. Season two premiered on April 25, 2018, and it was announced on May 2, 2018, that Hulu had renewed the series for a third season. Atwood appears in a cameo in the first episode as one of the Aunts at the Red Center. In 2019, a graphic novel (ISBN 9780224101936) based on the book and with the same title was published by Renée Nault.

In 2003, six of Atwood's short stories were adapted by Shaftesbury Films for the anthology television series The Atwood Stories.

Atwood's 2008 Massey Lectures were adapted into the documentary Payback (2012), by director Jennifer Baichwal. Commentary by Atwood and others such as economist Raj Patel, ecologist William E. Rees, and religious scholar Karen Armstrong, are woven into various stories that explore the concepts of debt and payback, including an Armenian blood feud, agricultural working conditions, and the Deepwater Horizon oil spill.

The novel Alias Grace (1996) was adapted into a six-part 2017 miniseries directed by Mary Harron and adapted by Sarah Polley. It premiered on CBC on September 25, 2017, and the full series was released on Netflix on November 3, 2017. Atwood makes a cameo in the fourth episode of the series as a disapproving churchgoer.

In the Wake of the Flood (released in October 2010), a documentary film by the Canadian director Ron Mann, followed Atwood on the unusual book tour for her novel The Year of the Flood (2009). During this innovative book tour, Atwood created a theatrical version of her novel, with performers borrowed from the local areas she was visiting. The documentary is described as "a fly-on-the-wall film vérité".

Atwood's children's book Wandering Wenda and Widow Wallop's Wunderground Washery (2011) was adapted into the children's television series The Wide World of Wandering Wenda, broadcast on CBC beginning in the spring of 2017. Aimed at early readers, the animated series follows Wenda and her friends as they navigate different adventures using words, sounds, and language.

Director Darren Aronofsky had been slated to direct an adaptation of the MaddAddam trilogy for HBO, but it was revealed in October 2016 that HBO had dropped the plan from its schedule. In January 2018, it was announced that Paramount Television and Anonymous Content had bought the rights to the trilogy and would be producing it without Aronofsky.

== Personal life ==
Atwood has a sister, Ruth Atwood, born in 1951, and a brother who is two years older, Harold Leslie Atwood. She has claimed that, according to her grandmother (maiden name Webster), the 17th-century witchcraft-lynching survivor Mary Webster might have been an ancestor: "On Monday, my grandmother would say Mary was her ancestor, and on Wednesday she would say she wasn't… So take your pick." Webster is the subject of Atwood's poem "Half-Hanged Mary", as well as the subject of Atwood's dedication in her novel The Handmaid's Tale (1985).

Atwood married Jim Polk, an American writer, in 1968, but they divorced in 1973. She formed a relationship with fellow novelist Graeme Gibson soon afterward and moved to a farm near Alliston, Ontario, where their daughter, Eleanor Jess Atwood Gibson, was born in 1976.

The family returned to Toronto in 1980. Atwood and Gibson were together until September 18, 2019, when Gibson died after suffering from dementia. She wrote about Gibson in the poem Dearly and in an accompanying essay on grief and poetry published in The Guardian in 2020. Atwood said about Gibson "He wasn't an egotist, so he wasn't threatened by anything I was doing. He said to our daughter towards the end of his life, 'Your mum would still have been a writer if she hadn't met me, but she wouldn't have had as much fun'".

Although she is an accomplished writer, Atwood says that she is "a terrible speller" who writes both on a computer and by hand.

Atwood maintains a summer home on Pelee Island in Lake Erie.

== Awards and honours ==
Atwood holds numerous honorary degrees from various institutions, including The Sorbonne, NUI Galway as well as Oxford and Cambridge universities.

Awards

- Governor General's Award, 1966, 1985
- Toronto Book Awards, 1977, 1989
- Companion of the Order of Canada, 1981
- Guggenheim fellowship, 1981
- Los Angeles Times Fiction Award, 1986
- American Humanist Association Humanist of the Year, 1987
- Nebula Award, 1986 and Prometheus Award, 1987 and 2020 nominations, both science fiction awards.
- Arthur C. Clarke Award for best Science Fiction, 1987
- Foreign Honorary Member of the American Academy of Arts and Sciences, 1988
- Canadian Booksellers Association Author of the Year, 1989
- Outstanding Canadian Award – Armenian Community Centre of Toronto, 1989
- Order of Ontario, 1990
- Trillium Book Award, 1991, 1993, 1995
- Giller Prize, 1996
- Government of France's Chevalier dans l'Ordre des Arts et des Lettres, 1994
- Helmerich Award, 1999, by the Tulsa Library Trust.
- Booker Prize, 2000, 2019
- Hammett Prize, 2000
- Key to the City of Ottawa, 2000, presented by acting mayor Allan Higdon
- Kenyon Review Award for Literary Achievement, 2007
- Prince of Asturias Award for Literature, 2008
- Fellow Royal Society of Literature, 2010
- Nelly Sachs Prize, Germany, 2010
- Dan David Prize, Israel, 2010
- Queen Elizabeth II Diamond Jubilee Medal, Canada, 2012
- Los Angeles Times Book Prize "Innovator's Award", 2012
- Royalty Society of Literature's "Companions of Literature" award, 2012
- Audie Award for Fiction, 2013
- Gold medal of the Royal Canadian Geographical Society, 2015
- Crime Writers of Canada Awards of Excellence, 2015 (for the short story Stone Mattress)
- Golden Wreath of Struga Poetry Evenings, Macedonia, 2016
- Ivan Sandrof Lifetime Achievement Award, 2016
- PEN Pinter Prize, 2016
- Tähtivaeltaja Award 2016, 2020
- Franz Kafka Prize, Czech Republic, 2017
- St. Louis Literary Award, 2017
- Aurora Awards, 2017
- Peace Prize of the German Book Trade, Germany, 2017
- Lorne Pierce Medal, 2018
- Member of the Order of the Companions of Honour, 2019
- Goodreads Choice Awards, 2013, 2019, 2020
- The Center for Fiction, 2019
- Galaxy Award, China, 2019
- Dayton Literary Peace Prize, 2020
- British Book Awards, 2020
- Kurd Laßwitz Award, 2020
- Australian Book Industry Awards, 2020
- British Academy President's Medal, 2020
- Emerson-Thoreau Medal (2020)
- Officer's Cross of the Order of Merit of the Federal Republic of Germany
- Hitchens Prize (2022)
- Hans Christian Andersen Literature Award (2024)
- Eleanor Roosevelt Lifetime Achievement Award (2025)

Atwood also was nominated for Primetime Emmy Award for Outstanding Drama Series as The Handmaid's Tale's producer in 2018, 2020, and 2021.

In 2025 she was ranked #13 on Toronto Life's annual Most Influential list.

Honorary degrees

- Trent University, 1973
- Queen's University, 1974
- Concordia University, 1979
- Smith College, 1982
- University of Toronto, 1983
- University of Waterloo, 1985
- University of Guelph, 1985
- Mount Holyoke College, 1985
- Victoria College, 1987
- Université de Montréal, 1991
- University of Leeds, 1994
- McMaster University, 1996
- Lakehead University, 1998
- University of Oxford, 1998
- Algoma University, 2001
- University of Cambridge, 2001
- Dartmouth College, 2004
- Harvard University, 2004
- Université de la Sorbonne Nouvelle, 2005
- National University of Ireland, Galway, 2011
- Ryerson University, 2012
- Royal Military College of Canada (LLD), November 16, 2012
- University of Athens, 2013
- University of Edinburgh, 2014
- Universidad Autónoma de Madrid, 2017
- University of St Andrews, 2023
- University of York, 2025

== Works ==
Summary Bibliography

Novels

- The Edible Woman (1969)
- Surfacing (1972)
- Lady Oracle (1976)
- Life Before Man (1979, finalist for the Governor General's Award)
- Bodily Harm (1981)
- The Handmaid's Tale (1985, winner of the 1987 Arthur C. Clarke Award and 1985 Governor General's Award, finalist for the 1986 Booker Prize)
- Cat's Eye (1988, finalist for the 1988 Governor General's Award and the 1989 Booker Prize)
- The Robber Bride (1993, finalist for the 1994 Governor General's Award and shortlisted for the James Tiptree Jr. Award)
- Alias Grace (1996, winner of the 1996 Giller Prize, finalist for the 1996 Booker Prize and the 1996 Governor General's Award, shortlisted for the 1997 Orange Prize for Fiction)
- The Blind Assassin (2000, winner of the 2000 Booker Prize and finalist for the 2000 Governor General's Award, shortlisted for the 2001 Orange Prize for Fiction.)
- Oryx and Crake (2003, finalist for the 2003 Booker Prize and the 2003 Governor General's Award and shortlisted for the 2004 Orange Prize for Fiction.)
- The Penelopiad (2005, nominated for the 2006 Mythopoeic Fantasy Award for Adult Literature and longlisted for the 2007 International Dublin Literary Award)
- The Year of the Flood (2009, Oryx and Crake companion, longlisted for the 2011 International Dublin Literary Award)
- MaddAddam (2013) (Third novel in Oryx and Crake trilogy)
- Scribbler Moon (written in 2014 as part of Future Library; will remain unpublished until 2114)
- The Heart Goes Last (2015) (Winner of the 2015 Red Tentacle award)
- Hag-Seed (2016) (Longlisted for the 2017 Women Prize for Fiction)
- The Testaments (2019, joint winner of the 2019 Booker Prize)

Short fiction collections

- Dancing Girls (1977, winner of the St. Lawrence Award for Fiction and the award of The Periodical Distributors of Canada for Short Fiction)
- Murder in the Dark (1983)
- Bluebeard's Egg (1983)
- Wilderness Tips (1991, finalist for the Governor General's Award)
- Good Bones (1992)
- Good Bones and Simple Murders (1994)
- The Labrador Fiasco (1996)
- The Tent (2006)
- Moral Disorder (2006)
- Stone Mattress (2014)
- Old Babes in the Wood (2023)

Poetry collections

- Double Persephone (1961)
- The Circle Game (1964, winner of the 1966 Governor General's Award)
- Expeditions (1965)
- Speeches for Doctor Frankenstein (1966)
- The Animals in That Country (1968)
- The Journals of Susanna Moodie (1970)
- Procedures for Underground (1970)
- Power Politics (1971)
- You Are Happy (1974) Includes the poem Song of the Worms
- Selected Poems (1976)
- Two-Headed Poems (1978)
- True Stories (1981)
- Snake Poems (1983)
- Interlunar (1984)
- Selected Poems 1966–1984 (Canada)
- Selected Poems II: 1976–1986 (US)
- Morning in the Burned House, McClelland & Stewart (1995)
- Eating Fire: Selected Poems, 1965–1995 (UK,1998)
  - "You Begin." (1978) – as recited by Margaret Atwood; included in all three most recent editions of her "Selected Poems" as listed above (US, CA, UK)
- The Door (2007)
- Dearly (2020)
- Paper Boat: New and Selected Poems: 1961–2023 (2024)

E-books

- I'm Starved For You: Positron, Episode One (2012)
- Choke Collar: Positron, Episode Two (2012)
- Erase Me: Positron, Episode Three (2013)
- The Heart Goes Last: Positron, Episode Four (2013)
- The Happy Zombie Sunrise Home (2013) (with Naomi Alderman)
- My Evil Mother (2022)
- Cut and Thirst (2024)

Anthologies edited

- The New Oxford Book of Canadian Verse (1982)
- The Canlit Foodbook (1987)
- The Oxford Book of Canadian Short Stories in English (1988)
- The Best American Short Stories 1989 (1989) (with Shannon Ravenel)
- The New Oxford Book of Canadian Short Stories in English (1995)

Children's books

- Up in the Tree (1978)
- Anna's Pet (1980) (with Joyce C. Barkhouse)
- For the Birds (1990) (with Shelly Tanaka)
- Princess Prunella and the Purple Peanut (1995)
- Rude Ramsay and the Roaring Radishes (2003)
- Bashful Bob and Doleful Dorinda (2006)
- Wandering Wenda and Widow Wallop's Wunderground Washery (2011); inspired a cartoon series called Wandering Wenda in 2016.

Non-fiction

- Survival: A Thematic Guide to Canadian Literature (1972)
- Days of the Rebels 1815–1840 (1977)
- Second Words: Selected Critical Prose (1982)
- Through the One-Way Mirror (1986)
- Strange Things: The Malevolent North in Canadian Literature (1995)
- Negotiating with the Dead: A Writer on Writing (2002)
- Moving Targets: Writing with Intent, 1982–2004 (2004)
- Writing with Intent: Essays, Reviews, Personal Prose 1983–2005 (2005)
- Payback: Debt and the Shadow Side of Wealth (2008)
- In Other Worlds: SF and the Human Imagination (2011)
- On Writers and Writing (2015)
- Burning Questions: Essays & Occasional Pieces 2004–2021 (2022)
- Book of Lives: A Memoir of Sorts (2025)

Drawings

- Kanadian Kultchur Komix featuring "Survivalwoman" in This Magazine under the pseudonym, Bart Gerrard 1975–1980
- Others appear on her website.

Comics

- Angel Catbird (#1–3), with Johnnie Christmas and Tamra Bonvillain (2016)
- War Bears (#1–3), with Ken Steacy (2018)

Television scripts

- The Servant Girl (1974)
- Snowbird (1981)
- Heaven on Earth (1987)

Libretti

- The Trumpets of Summer (1964) (with composer John Beckwith)
- Frankenstein Monster Song (2004, with rock band One Ring Zero)
- "Pauline", a chamber opera in two acts, with composer Tobin Stokes for City Opera Vancouver (2014)

Audio recordings

- The Poetry and Voice of Margaret Atwood (1977)
- Margaret Atwood Reads "Unearthing Suite" (1985)
- Margaret Atwood Reading From Her Poems (2005)
- Margaret Atwood as herself in Zombies, Run, as a surviving radio operator in themes.

Filmography

- She is credited as herself in all 26 episodes of the Breakthrough Entertainment's children's show The Wide World of Wandering Wenda in which she wears funny hats to match the various themes (2017)

== See also ==
- Canadian poetry
- List of Canadian poets
- Southern Ontario Gothic
