= The Circle Game (poetry collection) =

1964 poetry collection by Margaret Atwood

First edition, published by Contact Press

The Circle Game is a poetry collection written by Canadian author Margaret Atwood in 1964. The book was the winner of the 1966 Governor General's Award.

== Publication history ==
Atwood first issued The Circle Game in a limited art-press format in 1964, followed by a trade edition with Contact Press in 1966 and a House of Anansi edition in 1967.

== Motifs ==
As in most of Atwood's works, this collection of poetry explores many tensions or dualities such as the tensions between man and woman, perception and reality, and many more. The Circle Game focuses particularly on the tension between perception and reality; at first glance something may seem harmless or even friendly, but deeper inspection reveals a dark, sad, or disturbing truth.
