= Graeme Gibson =

Canadian novelist (1934–2019)

Graeme Gibson CM FRCGS
- Born: Thomas Graeme Cameron Gibson; 9 August 1934; London, Ontario, Canada
- Died: 18 September 2019 (aged 85); London, England
- Education: University of Western Ontario
- Occupation: Novelist
- Spouse: Shirley Gibson (div. c. 1973)
- Partner: Margaret Atwood (1973–2019; his death)
- Children: 3
- Writing career
- Genres: Novel; non-fiction
- Notable work: Perpetual Motion (1982)

Thomas Graeme Cameron Gibson CM FRCGS (9 August 1934 – 18 September 2019) was a Canadian novelist. He was a Member of the Order of Canada (1992), a Senior Fellow of Massey College and one of the organizers of the Writers Union of Canada (chair, 1974–75). He was also a founder of the Writers' Trust of Canada, a non-profit literary organization that seeks to encourage Canada's writing community.

== Career ==
The elder son of Brigadier General Thomas Graeme Gibson, a career Army officer, and radio singer Mary (née Cameron), of Australian origin, Gibson's family frequently moved around during his childhood, going from Halifax to Ottawa to Toronto where he attended Upper Canada College. As an author, Gibson wrote both novels and non-fiction. His first novel, Five Legs (1969), is widely regarded as a breakthrough in Canadian experimental literature. His other novels include Communion (1971), Gentleman Death (1993), and Perpetual Motion (1982). His non-fiction included Eleven Canadian Novelists (1973) and more recently, The Bedside Book of Birds (2005) and The Bedside Book of Beasts (2009).

Gibson was awarded the Toronto Arts Award (1990) the Harbourfront Festival prize in 1993, and he was made a member of the Order of Canada.

An arts, environmental and social justice advocate, Gibson was one of the founders of the Writers' Union of Canada, which recognized his contribution by establishing an award in his honour in 1991. He was involved in the formation of the Writer's Trust of Canada and was a co-founder and president (1987–89) of PEN Canada. He also had a small acting role in the 1983 film The Wars.

His environmental advocacy was largely focused around his longtime love of birds. He was a founder and chair of the Pelee Island Bird Observatory, served on the Council of the World Wildlife Fund, and with Margaret Atwood, as co-chair of Birdlife International's Rare Bird Club. He was a Fellow of the Royal Canadian Geographical Society, which awarded him a Gold Medal in 2015.

== Personal life and death ==
Gibson was married to publisher Shirley Gibson until the early 1970s, and together they had two sons, Matt and Grae. He began dating novelist and poet Margaret Atwood in 1973. They moved to a semi-derelict farm near Alliston, Ontario, which they set about doing up and where according to Atwood they were making "attempts at farming, writing and trying to earn enough to live". Their daughter Eleanor Jess Atwood Gibson was born there in 1976. The family returned to Toronto in 1980. Atwood and Gibson stayed together until his death in 2019.

In 2017, Gibson was diagnosed with early signs of vascular dementia. Despite having written a book on birds, he could no longer identify those he liked to watch in his garden, but said "I no longer know their names, but then, they don't know my name either". He died on 18 September 2019 in London, England, where Atwood was promoting her new book, five days after suffering a severe stroke. Atwood later said about his death that it had not been unexpected due to the vascular dementia, that it had been a good one—and in a good hospital, and his children had time to come and say goodbye—and that he had been "declining and he had wanted to check out before he reached any further stages of that".

Following his death, the Writers' Trust of Canada renamed its annual fiction award, formerly the Rogers Writers' Trust Fiction Prize, to the Atwood Gibson Writers' Trust Fiction Prize in early 2021.

== Bibliography ==
- Five Legs (1969)
- Communion (1971)
- Eleven Canadian Novelists (1973)
- Perpetual Motion (1982)
- Gentleman Death (1993)
- The Bedside Book of Birds (2005)
- The Bedside Book of Beasts (2009)
