= Charles Pachter =

Canadian artist (born 1942)

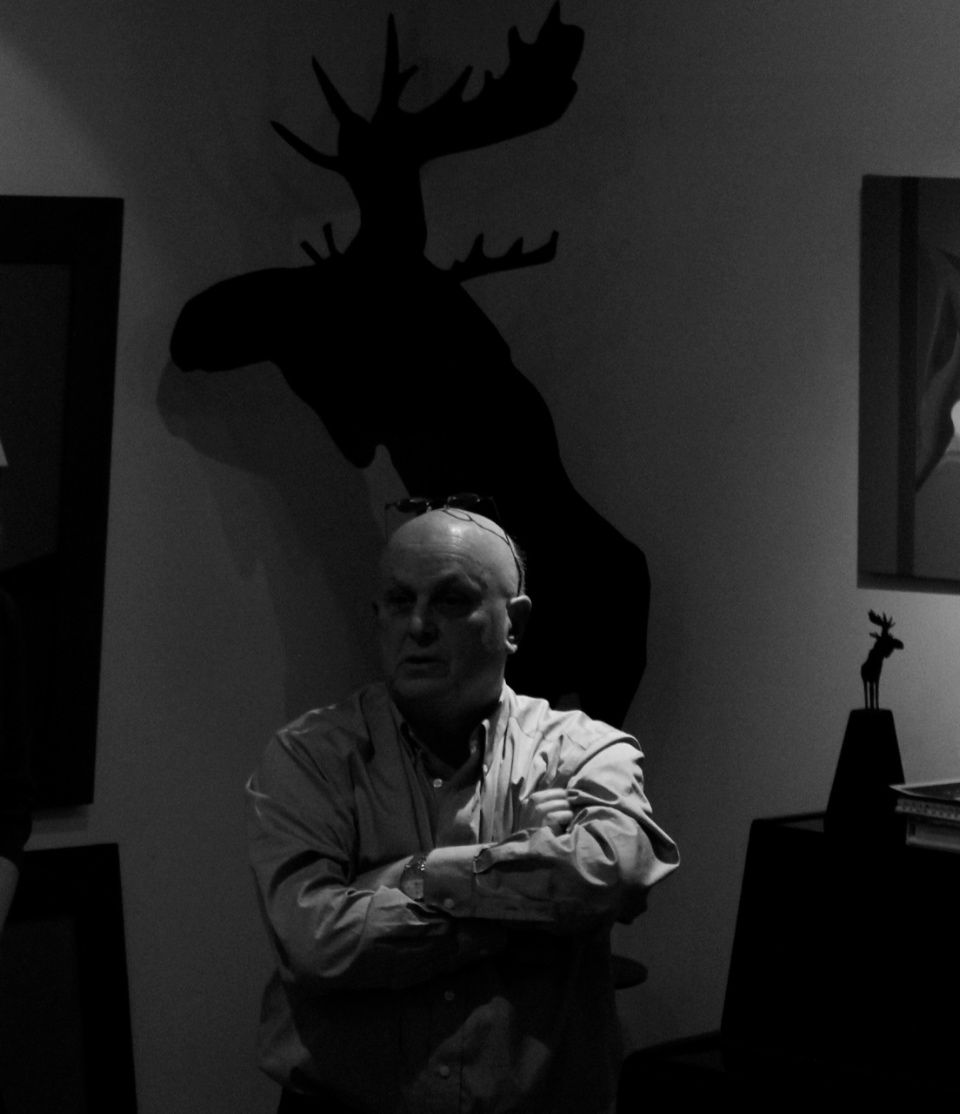
- Charles Pachter
- Born: Charles Pachter; December 30, 1942 (age 83); Toronto, Ontario, Canada
- Education: Sorbonne, University of Toronto, Cranbrook Academy of Art
- Known for: painter, printmaker, sculptor, designer, historian, lecturer

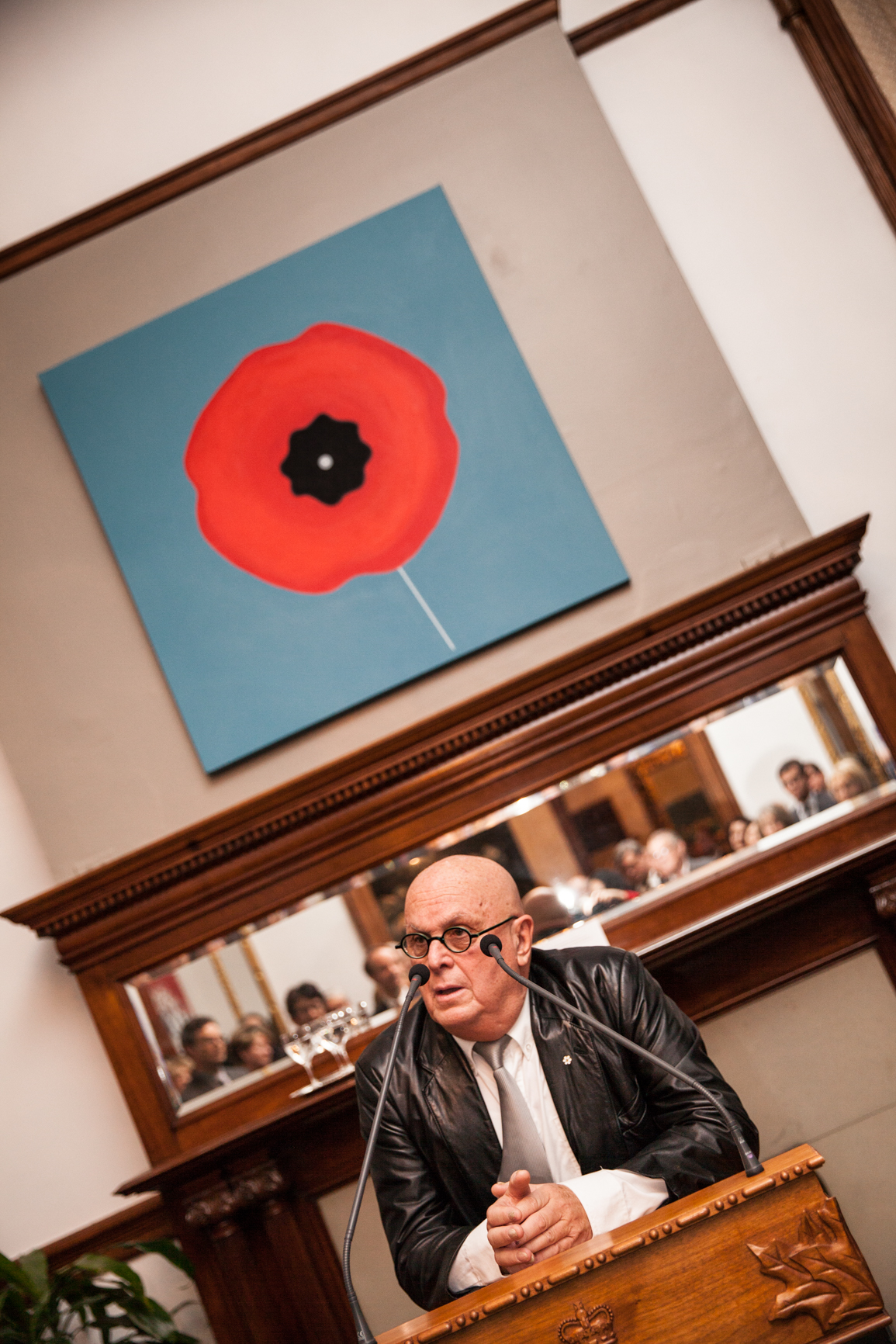
Pachter and one of his works during an exhibition opening in the Lieutenant Governor's Suite, Toronto, 26 November 2014

Charles Pachter OC OOnt LL D. DFA (born December 30, 1942) is a Canadian contemporary artist. He is a painter, printmaker, sculptor, designer, historian, and lecturer. He studied French literature at the Sorbonne, art history at University College in the University of Toronto, and painting and graphics at the Cranbrook Academy of Art in Bloomfield Hills, Michigan. He holds honorary doctorates from Lakehead University, Brock University, the Ontario College of Art & Design and the University of Toronto (2010). He was named a Member of the Order of Canada in 1999, and promoted to Officer in 2011.

Pachter's work has been shown at the Art Gallery of Ontario, the Royal Ontario Museum, and the McMichael Canadian Art Collection, Kleinburg. His mural, Hockey Knights in Canada, Les Rois de l'Arène, can be seen at Toronto's College subway station, where the Montreal Canadiens face the Toronto Maple Leafs across the tracks.

Pachter lives and works beside Grange Park in an award-winning residence and studio designed by Stephen Teeple. Since that construction, from 2019 to 2022, a new 3 storey wing was added onto an additional derelict property that was beside it. His work is on permanent display in his adjoining Moose Factory gallery. His work has influenced a generation of young Canadian artists, including the sculptor Harley Valentine. A number of his pieces have also featured Elizabeth II, Queen of Canada, and other members of the royal family. Pachter met the Queen at Canada House in 2017. Asked about their conversation, Pachter recounted, "I said, 'Your Majesty, 43 years ago I painted you as the Queen of Canada seated sidesaddle on a moose and, thanks to you, I have made a living all these years.' She beamed and said, 'How amusing!'"

The highest selling price at auction for a piece of his work might have been $79,250, including the premium, for Red Barn at Heffel in January 2022. Size is 30"x40". However on November 19, 2025, his work Bay Watch shattered that record at Heffel's Hudson's Bay company's art auction selling for $181,250. The size is 36"x48".

Early in his life, Charles appeared as Johnny in the short film "Johnny at the Fair". It was later featured and riffed on Mystery Science Theater 3000 in Season 4.

== Awards ==
- Officer of the Order of Canada
- Chevalier of France's Ordre des Arts et des Lettres
- Queen Elizabeth II's Jubilee Medal
- Order of Ontario
- Honorary Doctorate (2010), University of Toronto (LL. D), OCAD (DFA), etc.
