= Toronto Book Awards =

Canadian literary award

The Toronto Book Awards are Canadian literary awards, presented annually by the City of Toronto government to the author of the year's best fiction or non-fiction book or books "that are evocative of Toronto". The award is presented in the fall of each year, with its advance promotional efforts including a series of readings by the nominated authors at each year's The Word on the Street festival.

Each author shortlisted for the award receives $2,000, and the winner or winners receive the balance of $20,000.

The award has frequently gone to multiple winners. 1987 was the first time in the history of the award that only a single winner was named.

== Winners and nominees ==
=== 1970s ===
Toronto Book Awards winners and finalists, 1974-1979
| Year | Author | Title | Result | Ref. |
|---|---|---|---|---|
| 1974 | William Kurelek | O Toronto | Winner | |
| 1974 | Desmond Morton | Mayor Howland | Winner | |
| 1974 | Richard B. Wright | In the Middle of a Life | Winner | |
| 1974 | Sandra Budden and Joseph Ernst | The Movable Airport | Finalist | |
| 1974 | Austin Clarke | Storm of Fortune | Finalist | |
| 1974 | Michael Filey | Richard Howard and Helmut Weyerstrahs, Passengers Must Not Ride on Fender | Finalist | |
| 1974 | Hugh Hood | The Governor's Bridge Is Closed | Finalist | |
| 1974 | George Jonas | Cities | Finalist | |
| 1975 | Claude Bissell | Halfway Up Parnassus | Winner | |
| 1975 | The Labour History Collective | Women at Work | Winner | |
| 1975 | Loren Lind | The Learning Machine | Winner | |
| 1975 | Max Braithwaite | Sick Kids | Finalist | |
| 1975 | Juan Butler | Canadian Healing Oil | Finalist | |
| 1975 | Jon Caulfield | The Tiny Perfect Mayor | Finalist | |
| 1975 | Dennis Lee | Alligator Pie - Nicholas Knock | Finalist | |
| 1975 | Harold Town | Albert Franck: His Life, Times and Work | Finalist | |
| 1976 | Robert F. Harney and Harold Troper | Immigrants: A Portrait of the Urban Experience 1890-1930 | Winner | |
| 1976 | Hugh Hood | The Swing in the Garden | Winner | |
| 1976 | Jack Batten | The Leafs in Autumn | Finalist | |
| 1976 | Morley Callaghan | A Fine and Private Place | Finalist | |
| 1976 | Austin Clarke | The Bigger Light | Finalist | |
| 1976 | Hans Jewinski | Poet Cop | Finalist | |
| 1976 | Harry Pollock | Gabriel | Finalist | |
| 1976 | Ian Wallace and Angela Wood | The Sandwich | Finalist | |
| 1977 | Margaret Atwood | Lady Oracle | Winner | |
| 1977 | Margaret Gibson | The Butterfly Ward | Winner | |
| 1977 | Michael Filey | Trillium and Toronto Island | Finalist | |
| 1977 | William Kilbourn | The Toronto Book | Finalist | |
| 1977 | Raymond Massey | When I Was Young | Finalist | |
| 1977 | Stan Obodiac | The Leafs: The First 50 Years | Finalist | |
| 1977 | Miriam Waddington | The Price of Gold | Finalist | |
| 1978 | Christopher Armstrong and H. V. Nelles | The Revenge of the Methodist Bicycle Company | Winner | |
| 1978 | Timothy Findley | The Wars | Winner | |
| 1978 | Harry Adaskin | A Fiddler's World | Finalist | |
| 1978 | Morley Callaghan | Close to the Sun Again | Finalist | |
| 1978 | George Jonas and Barbara Amiel | By Persons Unknown | Finalist | |
| 1979 | Michael Bliss | A Canadian Millionaire | Winner | |
| 1979 | William Dendy | Lost Toronto | Winner | |
| 1979 | John Morgan Gray | Fun Tomorrow | Winner | |
| 1979 | Morley Callaghan | No Man's Meat and The Enchanted Pimp | Finalist | |
| 1979 | Paul Duval | The Tangled Garden | Finalist | |
| 1979 | Marian Engel | The Glassy Sea | Finalist | |
| 1979 | James Lorimer | The Developers | Finalist | |
| 1979 | Peter Mellen | Landmarks of Canadian Art | Finalist | |
| 1979 | David Lewis Stein | City Boys | Finalist | |

=== 1980s ===
Toronto Book Awards winners and finalists, 1980-1989
| Year | Author | Title | Result | Ref. |
|---|---|---|---|---|
| 1980 | Raymond Souster | Hanging In | Winner | |
| 1980 | Stephen A. Speisman | The Jews of Toronto: A History to 1937 | Winner | |
| 1980 | Eric Arthur | From Front Street to Queen's Park: The Story of Ontario's Parliament Buildings | Finalist | |
| 1980 | Margaret Atwood | Life Before Man | Finalist | |
| 1980 | Shirley Faessler | Everything in the Window | Finalist | |
| 1980 | Hugh Hood | Reservoir Ravine | Finalist | |
| 1980 | Richard B. Howard | Upper Canada College 1928-1979: Colbourne's Legacy | Finalist | |
| 1980 | Blair G. Laing | Memoirs of an Art Dealer | Finalist | |
| 1981 | Timothy Colton | Big Daddy: Frederick G. Gardiner and the Building of Metropolitan Toronto | Winner | |
| 1981 | Mary Larratt Smith | Young Mr. Smith in Upper Canada | Winner | |
| 1981 | Helen Weinzweig | Basic Black with Pearls | Winner | |
| 1981 | Gregory S. Kealey | Toronto Workers Respond to Industrial Capitalism, 1867-1892 | Finalist | |
| 1981 | John Lownsbrough | The Privileged Few: The Grange & Its People in Nineteenth Century Toronto | Finalist | |
| 1981 | Austin Seton Thompson | Jarvis Street: A Story of Triumph and Tragedy | Finalist | |
| 1981 | Richard B. Wright | Final Things | Finalist | |
| 1982 | Claude Bissell | The Young Vincent Massey | Winner | |
| 1982 | Marian Engel | Lunatic Villas | Winner | |
| 1982 | Robertson Davies | The Rebel Angels | Finalist | |
| 1982 | Michael Filey | I Remember Sunnyside | Finalist | |
| 1982 | Bernice Thurman Hunter | That Scatterbrain Booky | Finalist | |
| 1982 | Charles Sauriol | Remembering the Don | Finalist | |
| 1982 | Conn Smythe with Scott Young | If You Can't Beat 'Em in the Alley | Finalist | |
| 1983 | Michael Bliss | The Discovery of Insulin | Winner | |
| 1983 | Lucy Booth Martyn | The Face of Early Toronto: An Archival Record 1803-1936 | Winner | |
| 1983 | Larry Partridge | The Witts | Finalist | |
| 1983 | Clara Thomas and John Lennox | William Arthur Deacon: A Canadian Literary Life | Finalist | |
| 1983 | Tim Wynne-Jones | The Knot | Finalist | |
| 1984 | Edith G. Firth | Toronto in Art | Winner | |
| 1984 | Gerald Killan | David Boyle: From Artisan to Archaeologist | Winner | |
| 1984 | Eric Wright | The Night the Gods Smiled | Winner | |
| 1984 | Bill Ivy | A Little Wilderness: The Natural History of Toronto | Finalist | |
| 1984 | Rod McQueen | The Money-Spinners | Finalist | |
| 1984 | Marion Royce | Eunice Dyke: Health Care Pioneer | Finalist | |
| 1985 | Warabe Aska | Who Goes to the Park | Winner | |
| 1985 | J.M.S. Careless | Toronto to 1918 | Winner | |
| 1985 | Josef Skvorecky | The Engineer of Human Souls | Winner | |
| 1985 | Patrick Brode | Sir John Beverley Robinson | Finalist | |
| 1985 | Margaret McKelvey and Merlyn McKelvey | Toronto: Carved in Stone | Finalist | |
| 1985 | David G. Pitt | E.J. Pratt: The Truant Years 1882-1927 | Finalist | |
| 1985 | Victor L. Russell | Forging a Consensus | Finalist | |
| 1986 | Morley Callaghan | Our Lady of the Snows | Winner | |
| 1986 | Robertson Davies | What's Bred in the Bone | Winner | |
| 1986 | Neil Bissoondath | Digging Up the Mountains | Finalist | |
| 1986 | Rosemary Donegan | Spadina Avenue | Finalist | |
| 1986 | James Lemon | Toronto Since 1918: An Illustrated History | Finalist | |
| 1986 | Patricia McHugh | Toronto Architecture: A City Guide | Finalist | |
| 1987 | William Dendy and William Kilbourn | Toronto Observed: Its Architecture, Patrons and History | Winner | |
| 1987 | John Coldwell Adams | Sir Charles God Damn: The Life of Sir Charles G.D. Roberts | Finalist | |
| 1987 | June Callwood | Twelve Weeks in Spring | Finalist | |
| 1987 | Lovat Dickson | The Museum Makers: The Story of the Royal Ontario Museum | Finalist | |
| 1987 | Michael Filey | Not a One-Horse Town: 125 Years of Toronto and Its Streetcars | Finalist | |
| 1987 | Martin O'Malley | Hospital: Life and Death in a Major Medical Centre | Finalist | |
| 1988 | Michael Ondaatje | In the Skin of a Lion | Winner | |
| 1988 | Joan Hollobon | The Lion's Tale: A History of the Wellesley Hospital, 1912-1978 | Finalist | |
| 1988 | Cyril H. Levitt and William Shaffir | The Riot at Christie Pits | Finalist | |
| 1988 | Tom MacDonnell | Never Let Go: The Tragedy of Kristy McFarlane | Finalist | |
| 1988 | Anna Porter | Mortal Sins | Finalist | |
| 1989 | Margaret Atwood | Cat's Eye | Winner | |
| 1989 | Shirley Faessler | A Basket of Apples | Finalist | |
| 1989 | Robert Fulford | Best Seat in the House | Finalist | |
| 1989 | Alison Gordon | The Dead Pull Hitter | Finalist | |
| 1989 | Michael Kluckner | Toronto The Way It Was | Finalist | |
| 1989 | Rick Salutin | A Man of Little Faith | Finalist | |
| 1989 | Paul Stuewe | The Storm Below: The Turbulent Life and Times of Hugh Garner | Finalist | |

=== 1990s ===
Toronto Book Awards winners and finalists, 1990-1999
| Year | Author | Title | Result | Ref. |
|---|---|---|---|---|
| 1990 | Hilary Russell | Double Take: The Story of the Elgin and Winter Garden Theatres | Winner | |
| 1990 | Guy Vanderhaeghe | Homesick | Winner | |
| 1990 | John Ayre | Northrop Frye | Finalist | |
| 1990 | Don Bailey | Memories of Margaret | Finalist | |
| 1990 | Stuart McLean | The Morningside World of Stuart McLean | Finalist | |
| 1990 | M. NourbeSe Philip | Harriet's Daughter | Finalist | |
| 1990 | Jack Pollock | Dear M | Finalist | |
| 1991 | Cary Fagan and Robert MacDonald (eds.) | Streets of Attitude: Toronto Stories | Winner | |
| 1991 | Cary Fagan | City Hall and Mrs. God: A Passionate Journey Through a Changing Toronto | Finalist | |
| 1991 | Mary Jo Leddy | Say to the Darkness, We Beg to Differ | Finalist | |
| 1991 | Claire MacKay and Johnny Wales | The Toronto Story | Finalist | |
| 1991 | Jocko Thomas | From Police Headquarters | Finalist | |
| 1991 | Morley Torgov | St. Farb's Day | Finalist | |
| 1991 | Dan Yashinsky | Tales for an Unknown City | Finalist | |
| 1992 | Katherine Govier | Hearts of Flame | Winner | |
| 1992 | Margaret Atwood | Wilderness Tips | Finalist | |
| 1992 | David Gilmour | How Boys See Girls | Finalist | |
| 1992 | Kenneth Oppel and Regolo Ricci | Cosimo Cat | Finalist | |
| 1992 | Allan Stratton | Bag Babies | Finalist | |
| 1992 | Gregory Ward | The Carpet King | Finalist | |
| 1992 | Marianne Zeitlin | Next of Kin | Finalist | |
| 1993 | Carole Corbeil | Voice-Over | Winner | |
| 1993 | David Donnell | China Blues | Winner | |
| 1993 | Paul Donovan | Paint Cans | Finalist | |
| 1993 | Paul Kropp | Ellen/Elena/Luna | Finalist | |
| 1993 | Don Ritchie | North Toronto | Finalist | |
| 1994 | Timothy Findley | Headhunter | Winner | |
| 1994 | Margaret Atwood | The Robber Bride | Finalist | |
| 1994 | Nancy Baker | The Night Inside | Finalist | |
| 1994 | Catherine Bush | Minus Time | Finalist | |
| 1994 | John Ibbitson | The Night Hazel Came to Town | Finalist | |
| 1994 | William Kilbourn | Intimate Grandeur | Finalist | |
| 1995 | Ezra Schabas | Sir Ernest MacMillan: The Importance of Being Canadian | Winner | |
| 1995 | Jack Batten | The Leafs: An Anecdotal History of the Toronto Maple Leafs | Finalist | |
| 1995 | Cary Fagan | The Animals' Waltz | Finalist | |
| 1995 | Eric Wright | Moodie's Tale | Finalist | |
| 1996 | Rosemary Sullivan | Shadow Maker: The Life of Gwendolyn MacEwen | Winner | |
| 1996 | Timothy Findley | The Piano Man's Daughter | Finalist | |
| 1996 | Robert Fulford | Accidental City | Finalist | |
| 1996 | Wayne Grady | Toronto the Wild, Field Notes of an Urban Naturalist | Finalist | |
| 1996 | Greg Kramer | The Pursemonger of Fugu | Finalist | |
| 1996 | Tim Wynne-Jones | The Maestro | Finalist | |
| 1997 | Anne Michaels | Fugitive Pieces | Winner | |
| 1997 | David Eddie | Chump Change | Finalist | |
| 1997 | Kevin Irie | The Colour of Eden | Finalist | |
| 1997 | Kim Moritsugu | Looks Perfect | Finalist | |
| 1997 | Richard Scrimger | Crosstown | Finalist | |
| 1998 | Helen Humphreys | Leaving Earth | Winner | |
| 1998 | Carole Corbeil | In the Wings | Finalist | |
| 1998 | Joanne Gerber | In the Misleading Absence of Light | Finalist | |
| 1998 | Bruce McCall | Thin Ice | Finalist | |
| 1998 | Barbara Nichol | Dippers | Finalist | |
| 1998 | Antanas Sileika | Buying on Time | Finalist | |
| 1999 | Richard Outram | Benedict Abroad | Winner | |
| 1999 | Dennis Bock | Olympia | Finalist | |
| 1999 | James Chatto | The Man Who Ate Toronto: Memoirs of a Restaurant Lover | Finalist | |
| 1999 | Derek McCormack and Chris Chambers | Wild Mouse | Finalist | |
| 1999 | Stuart McLean | Home from the Vinyl Cafe | Finalist | |

=== 2000s ===
Toronto Book Awards winners and finalists, 2000-2009
| Year | Author | Title | Result | Ref. |
|---|---|---|---|---|
| 2000 | Camilla Gibb | Mouthing the Words | Winner | |
| 2000 | Jennifer Duncan | Sanctuary and Other Stories | Finalist | |
| 2000 | Greg Gatenby | Toronto - A Literary Guide | Finalist | |
| 2000 | Conrad E. Heidenreich, Betty Ida Roots, and Donald A. Chant | Betty Ida Roots and Donald A. Chant, Special Places: The Changing Ecosystems of the Toronto Region | Finalist | |
| 2000 | Russell Smith | Young Men | Finalist | |
| 2001 | A.B. McKillop | The Spinster and the Prophet: Florence Deeks, H.G. Wells and the Mystery of the Purloined Past | Winner | |
| 2001 | Margaret Atwood | The Blind Assassin | Finalist | |
| 2001 | Catherine Bush | The Rules of Engagement | Finalist | |
| 2001 | Jean Cochrane and Vincenzo Pietropaolo | Kensington | Finalist | |
| 2001 | Tessa McWatt | Dragons Cry | Finalist | |
| 2002 | Sarah Dearing | Courage My Love | Winner | |
| 2002 | Douglas Bell | Run Over: A Boy, His Mother and An Accident | Finalist | |
| 2002 | Jane Lind | Joyce Wieland: Artist on Fire | Finalist | |
| 2002 | Erín Moure | Sheep's Vigil by a Fervent Person | Finalist | |
| 2002 | Michael Redhill | Martin Sloane | Finalist | |
| 2002 | Elizabeth Ruth | Ten Good Seconds of Silence | Finalist | |
| 2003 | Joe Fiorito | The Song Beneath the Ice | Winner | |
| 2003 | Dionne Brand | thirsty | Finalist | |
| 2003 | Eric McCormack | The Dutch Wife | Finalist | |
| 2003 | Judith Merril and Emily Pohl-Weary | Better to Have Loved: The Life of Judith Merril | Finalist | |
| 2003 | Makeda Silvera | The Heart Does Not Bend | Finalist | |
| 2004 | Kevin Bazzana | Wondrous Strange: The Life and Art of Glenn Gould | Winner | |
| 2004 | Kate Taylor | Mme. Proust and the Kosher Kitchen | Winner | |
| 2004 | Tom Cruickshank and John de Visser | Old Toronto Houses | Finalist | |
| 2004 | Kristen den Hartog | The Perpetual Ending | Finalist | |
| 2004 | Aren X. Tulchinsky | The Five Books of Moses Lapinsky | Finalist | |
| 2005 | David Bezmozgis | Natasha and Other Stories | Winner | |
| 2005 | Constance Backhouse and Nancy L. Backhouse | The Heiress vs. the Establishment: Mrs. Campbell's Campaign for Legal Justice | Finalist | |
| 2005 | Shaughnessy Bishop-Stall | Down to This: Squalor and Splendour in a Big-City Shantytown | Finalist | |
| 2005 | Don Coles | Doctor Bloom's Story | Finalist | |
| 2005 | Russell Smith | Muriella Pent | Finalist | |
| 2006 | Dionne Brand | What We All Long For | Winner | |
| 2006 | Howard Akler | The City Man | Finalist | |
| 2006 | Stephen Marche | Raymond and Hannah | Finalist | |
| 2006 | Jason McBride and Alana Wilcox (eds.) | uTOpia: Towards a New Toronto | Finalist | |
| 2006 | M.G. Vassanji | When She Was Queen | Finalist | |
| 2007 | Michael Redhill | Consolation | Winner | |
| 2007 | Sally Gibson | Inside Toronto: Urban Interiors 1880s to 1920s | Finalist | |
| 2007 | Geoffrey James | Toronto | Finalist | |
| 2007 | Vincent Lam | Bloodletting & Miraculous Cures | Finalist | |
| 2007 | Raymond Souster | Uptown Downtown | Finalist | |
| 2008 | Glen Downie | Loyalty Management | Winner | |
| 2008 | Elspeth Cameron | And Beauty Answers: The Life of Frances Loring and Florence Wyle | Finalist | |
| 2008 | David Chariandy | Soucouyant | Finalist | |
| 2008 | Elyse Friedman | Long Story Short | Finalist | |
| 2008 | Barbara Gowdy | Helpless | Finalist | |
| 2009 | Austin Clarke | More | Winner | |
| 2009 | Anthony De Sa | Barnacle Love | Finalist | |
| 2009 | Maggie Helwig | Girls Fall Down | Finalist | |
| 2009 | Mark Osbaldeston | Unbuilt Toronto | Finalist | |
| 2009 | Charles Wilkins | In the Land of Long Fingernails | Finalist | |

=== 2010s ===
Toronto Book Awards winners and finalists, 2010-2019
| Year | Author | Title | Result | Ref. |
|---|---|---|---|---|
| 2010 | Mark Sinnett | The Carnivore | Winner | |
| 2010 | Seán Cullen | The Prince of Neither Here Nor There | Finalist | |
| 2010 | Cary Fagan | Valentine's Fall | Finalist | |
| 2010 | Lauren Kirshner | Where We Have to Go | Finalist | |
| 2010 | Dragan Todorović | Diary of Interrupted Days | Finalist | |
| 2011 | Rabindranath Maharaj | The Amazing Absorbing Boy | Winner | |
| 2011 | James FitzGerald | What Disturbs Our Blood | Finalist | |
| 2011 | James King | Étienne's Alphabet | Finalist | |
| 2011 | Nicholas Ruddock | The Parabolist | Finalist | |
| 2011 | Alissa York | Fauna | Finalist | |
| 2012 | Andrew J. Borkowski | Copernicus Avenue | Winner | |
| 2012 | Dave Bidini | Writing Gordon Lightfoot: The Man, the Music, and the World in 1972 | Finalist | |
| 2012 | Farzana Doctor | Six Metres of Pavement | Finalist | |
| 2012 | Michele Landsberg | Writing the Revolution | Finalist | |
| 2012 | Suzanne Robertson | Paramita, Little Black | Finalist | |
| 2013 | Kamal Al-Solaylee | Intolerable: A Memoir of Extremes | Winner | |
| 2013 | Patrick Cummins and Shawn Micallef | Full Frontal T.O. | Finalist | |
| 2013 | Kevin Irie | Viewing Tom Thomson, A Minority Report | Finalist | |
| 2013 | Aga Maksimowska | Giant | Finalist | |
| 2013 | Katrina Onstad | Everybody Has Everything | Finalist | |
| 2014 | Charlotte Gray | The Massey Murder: A Maid, Her Master and the Trial that Shocked a Country | Winner | |
| 2014 | Anthony De Sa | Kicking the Sky | Finalist | |
| 2014 | Carrianne Leung | The Wondrous Woo | Finalist | |
| 2014 | Nick Saul and Andrea Curtis | The Stop: How the Fight for Good Food Transformed a Community and Inspired a Movement | Finalist | |
| 2014 | Shyam Selvadurai | The Hungry Ghosts | Finalist | |
| 2015 | Emily St. John Mandel | Station Eleven | Winner | |
| 2015 | André Alexis | Fifteen Dogs | Finalist | |
| 2015 | Margaret Atwood | Stone Mattress | Finalist | |
| 2015 | Kathryn Kuitenbrouwer | All the Broken Things | Finalist | |
| 2015 | Bruce McDougall | The Last Hockey Game | Finalist | |
| 2016 | Cordelia Strube | On the Shores of Darkness, There Is Light | Winner | |
| 2016 | Howard Akler | Men of Action | Finalist | |
| 2016 | Ann Y. K. Choi | Kay’s Lucky Coin Variety | Finalist | |
| 2016 | John Lorinc, Michael McClelland, Ellen Scheinberg, and Tatum Taylor | The Ward: The Life and Loss of Toronto’s First Immigrant Neighbourhood | Finalist | |
| 2016 | Marnie Woodrow | Heyday | Finalist | |
| 2017 | B. Denham Jolly | In the Black: My Life | Winner | |
| 2017 | Jen Agg | I Hear She's a Real Bitch | Finalist | |
| 2017 | Catherine Hernandez | Scarborough | Finalist | |
| 2017 | John Lorinc, Jane Farrow, Stephanie Chambers, Maureen FitzGerald, Tim McCaskell, Rebecka Sheffield, Tatum Taylor, Rahim Thawer, and Ed Jackson | Any Other Way: How Toronto Got Queer | Finalist | |
| 2017 | James Maskalyk | Life on the Ground Floor: Letters from the Edge of Emergency Medicine | Finalist | |
| 2018 | David Chariandy | Brother | Winner | |
| 2018 | Dionne Brand | The Unpublished City | Finalist | |
| 2018 | Carrianne Leung | That Time I Loved You | Finalist | |
| 2018 | Lee Maracle | My Conversations with Canadians | Finalist | |
| 2018 | Kerri Sakamoto | Floating City | Finalist | |
| 2019 | Dionne Brand | Theory | Winner | |
| 2019 | Mike Barnes | Be With: Letters to a Caregiver | Finalist | |
| 2019 | Cary Fagan | The Student | Finalist | |
| 2019 | Didier Leclair | This Country of Mine | Finalist | |
| 2019 | Ian Williams | Reproduction | Finalist | |

=== 2020s ===
Toronto Book Awards winners and finalists, 2020-
| Year | Author | Title | Result | Ref. |
|---|---|---|---|---|
| 2020 | Desmond Cole | The Skin We're In | Winner | |
| 2020 | Jean Marc Ah-Sen | In the Beggarly Style of Imitation | Finalist | |
| 2020 | Vivian Chong and Georgia Webber | Dancing after TEN | Finalist | |
| 2020 | Katie Daubs | The Missing Millionaire | Finalist | |
| 2020 | Zalika Reid-Benta | Frying Plantain | Finalist | |
| 2021 | Kim Echlin | Speak, Silence | Winner | |
| 2021 | Catherine Graham | Æther: An Out-of-Body Lyric | Finalist | |
| 2021 | Faye Guenther | Swimmers in Winter | Finalist | |
| 2021 | Catherine Hernandez | Crosshairs | Finalist | |
| 2021 | Justin Ling | Missing from the Village | Finalist | |
| 2021 | Rinaldo Walcott | On Property | Finalist | |
| 2022 | Sarah Polley | Run Towards the Danger | Winner | |
| 2022 | Camilla Gibb | The Relatives | Finalist | |
| 2022 | Falen Johnson | Two Indians | Finalist | |
| 2022 | H. N. Khan | Wrong Side of the Court | Finalist | |
| 2022 | Adrienne Shadd, Afua Cooper, and Karolyn Smardz Frost | The Underground Railroad | Finalist | |
| 2023 | Wanda Nanibush, Georgiana Uhlyarik | Moving the Museum | Winner | |
| 2023 | Dionne Brand | Nomenclature | Finalist | |
| 2023 | Sophie Jai | Wildfires | Finalist | |
| 2023 | Sheila Murray | Finding Edward | Finalist | |
| 2023 | Carolyn Whitzman | Clara at the Door with a Revolver | Finalist | |
| 2024 | Maurice Vellekoop | I'm So Glad We Had This Time Together | Winner | |
| 2024 | Jennilee Austria-Bonifacio | Reuniting with Strangers | Finalist | |
| 2024 | Kristen den Hartog | The Roosting Box | Finalist | |
| 2024 | Connie Gault | The Rasmussen Papers | Finalist | |
| 2024 | Paul McLaughlin | The Suicide Magnet: Inside the Battle to Erect a Safety Barrier on Toronto’s Bloor Viaduct | Finalist | |
2025
| 2025 | Maggie Helwig | Encampment: Resistance, Grace, and an Unhoused Community | Winner | |
| 2025 | André Alexis | Other Worlds | Finalist | |
| 2025 | Vinh Nguyen | The Migrant Rain Falls in Reverse | Finalist | |
| 2025 | Roza Nozari | All the Parts We Exile | Finalist | |
| 2025 | Chika Stacy Oriuwa | Unlike the Rest: A Doctor's Story | Finalist | |
| 2025 | Tanya Talaga | The Knowing | Finalist | |
2026
| 2026 | Kate Cayley | Property | Winner | |
| 2026 | Sharon Bala | Good Guys | Finalist | |
| 2026 | Don Gillmor | Cherry Beach | Finalist | |
| 2026 | Jackie Khalilieh | You Started It | Finalist | |
| 2026 | Carolyn Strange | Fatal Confession: A Girl's Murder, a Man's Execution, and the Fitton Case | Finalist | |
