= Jane Farrow =

Canadian broadcaster

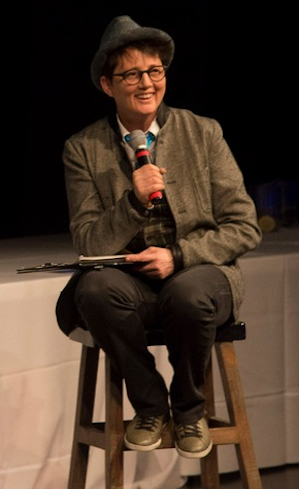
- Born: 1961 (age 64–65); Toronto, Ontario, Canada
- Education: University of Toronto (BA, 1989)
- Occupation: Community organizer

Jane Farrow is a Canadian author, broadcaster, and community organizer. Her written works include Wanted Words, Wanted Words 2, and (with Ira Basen, David Wallechinsky, and Amy Wallace) The Book of Lists: Canadian Edition. She worked for CBC Radio from 1998 to 2007, producing segments for programs such as This Morning and The Sunday Edition, including the popular word-game segment Wanted Words (from which the books of the same name were derived). Farrow hosted and co-created other short series and shows including Workology (about the modern workplace), the etymological program And Sometimes Y, Home (about people's obsession with domesticity), and The Omnivore (about people's relationships to food and eating). She and her producers won a Silver Medal at the New York Festivals Radio Awards for "The Brain and Language", a 2009 episode of And Sometimes Y on CBC Radio One.

== Activism and work ==
In the 1990s, Farrow worked as a program director at CKDU in Halifax and as a station manager at CIUT in Toronto, while also acting as the vice-president of the National Campus and Community Radio Association. While living in Vancouver she organized a conference for the National Association of Women and the Law in 1994. Returning to Toronto, she made several indie Super 8 films, becoming the operations director and program coordinator for the Inside Out Film and Video Festival.

While a resident of Ward 18 in the Queen West Triangle, Farrow helped form and later chaired the neighbourhood association Active 18. This coalition came together in 2005 and continues to advocate for good urban design and positive local development that contributes to and engages with local community.

Farrow was the first executive director of Jane's Walk, the now-international movement of free, locally-led walking tours inspired by urbanist Jane Jacobs. The walks invite people to explore their cities, share stories, and connect with neighbours. Working under the direction and guidance of urban planner Paul Hess, Farrow co-wrote North America's first studies of the walkability of inner-suburban high rise neighbourhoods. This research explores segments of Toronto's most densely populated but geographically isolated neighbourhoods and points to simple and inexpensive solutions for improving connectivity and accessibility. Alongside this research, the authors developed a research model and resource toolkit that can be used by communities and individual to assess their own neighbourhoods.

After five years with Jane's Walk, Farrow moved to Toronto City Hall to become executive assistant to Toronto City Councillor Mary-Margaret McMahon of Ward 32 Beaches—East York. While there, she helped forge the centrist coalition that reversed then-mayor Rob Ford's proposed $19 million budget cuts, ultimately breaking his majority hold in council and restoring funding for ice rinks, swimming pools, community grants, homeless shelters, leaf collection, and the Toronto Transit Commission.

In 2013 she worked with the Stephen Lewis Foundation, travelling to Uganda and Tanzania. Later that year she became a policy and campaign advisor to Park People, a Toronto-based nonprofit organization helping mobilize people to improve local parks.

Since 2014 Farrow has worked as an independent facilitator and community consultant, specializing in engaging neighbourhoods in dialogues about what they want in terms of urban design, planning, and public spaces.

In 2014, she declared her candidacy to for City Councillor of Ward 30 Toronto—Danforth, challenging undeclared incumbent Paula Fletcher in the 2014 municipal election. Fletcher was ultimately re-elected, with Farrow coming in third place.

In 2017, she co-edited Any Other Way: How Toronto Got Queer with John Lorinc, Stephanie Chambers, Maureen FitzGerald, Tim McCaskell, Rebecka Sheffield, Tatum Taylor, Rahim Thawer, and Ed Jackson. It was shortlisted for a Toronto Book Award.

== Personal life ==
Farrow is a lesbian.

In 2010, she rejected the position of "Honoured Dyke" to protest the Pride Toronto committee's banning of Queers Against Israeli Apartheid.

== Awards ==
- 2008 - Active Transportation Champion, Toronto Coalition for Active Transportation, for Jane's Walk
- 2009 - Silver Medal, New York Radio Awards, for And Sometimes Y episode "The Brain and Language"
- 2010 - Vital People grant, Toronto Community Foundation
- 2013 - 10 People We Love, Spacing magazine
- 2013 - City Soul Award, Canadian Urban Institute Urban Leadership Awards, for Jane's Walk
- 2014 - Lifetime Achievement Award, Inspire Awards

== Toronto city council election results ==
2014 Toronto municipal election, Ward 30 Toronto—Danforth
Candidate	Votes	%
Paula Fletcher	11,924	49.63%
Liz West	6,644	27.65%
Jane Farrow	4,815	20.04%
Mark Borden	302	1.26%
Francis Russell	206	0.86%
Daniel Trayes	134	0.56%
Total	24,025	100%
