= Faessler =

Faessler is a surname. Notable people with the surname include:

- Matt Faessler (born 1998), Australian rugby union player
- Shirley Faessler (1921–1997), Canadian writer
