= Festival of Literary Diversity =

Canadian literary festival

The Festival of Literary Diversity is an annual literary festival, which takes place in Brampton, Ontario, Canada. Founded in 2016 by Jael Richardson, the festival serves to promote and publicize literature by writers from underrepresented groups, such as Black Canadians, indigenous Canadians, Asian Canadians, disabled and LGBTQ writers, who are frequently overlooked by mainstream literary festivals.

In addition to the main annual festival, FOLD also sponsors an ongoing reading series, Writers at the Rose, at the city's Rose Theatre.

== 2016 ==
The inaugural festival in 2016 was headlined by Lawrence Hill, with other participants including Ian Kamau, Chase Joynt, Waubgeshig Rice, Farzana Doctor, Helen Humphreys, Heather O'Neill, Vivek Shraya, Zarqa Nawaz, Ayelet Tsabari, Cherie Dimaline, Brian Francis, Samuel Archibald, Zoe Whittall, Carrianne Leung, Dwayne Morgan and Patti LaBoucane-Benson.

== 2017 ==
The keynote speaker in 2017 was Eden Robinson. Other participants included Kamal Al-Solaylee, Gary Barwin, M-E Girard, Denham Jolly, Scaachi Koul, Jen Sookfong Lee, Monia Mazigh, Saleema Nawaz, Leah Lakshmi Piepzna-Samarasinha, Kai Cheng Thom and Katherena Vermette.

== 2018 ==
Participants in 2018 included Amber Dawn, Sharon Bala, Lisa Charleyboy, Cherie Dimaline, Omar El Akkad, Rachel Giese, Catherine Hernandez, Jamil Jivani, Kyo Maclear, Rabindranath Maharaj, Lee Maracle, Robyn Maynard, Kayla Perrin, Tanya Talaga, Jillian Tamaki, Kim Thúy and Joshua Whitehead.

== 2019 ==
The 2019 program included Sharon Bala, Ann Y. K. Choi, Esi Edugyan, Alicia Elliott, Joshua M. Ferguson, Cecil Foster, Catherine Hernandez, Uzma Jalaluddin, Larissa Lai, Téa Mutonji, Kathy Page, Waubgeshig Rice, Vivek Shraya, Tanya Talaga, Ian Williams and Winnie Yeung.

== 2020 ==
Due to the COVID-19 pandemic in Canada, the 2020 festival was staged online. Participants included Mona Awad, Edem Awumey, Billy-Ray Belcourt, Gwen Benaway, Ali Blythe, Wayne Grady, Samra Habib, Canisia Lubrin, Ryan McMahon, Rhonda Mullins, Casey Plett, Ahmad Danny Ramadan, Jesse Thistle, Kai Cheng Thom, Rinaldo Walcott, Jenny Heijun Wills and Lindsay Wong.
