= John Lorinc =

Canadian journalist

John Lorinc is a Canadian journalist, whose book Dream States: Smart Cities, Technology, and the Pursuit of Urban Utopias won the Balsillie Prize for Public Policy in 2022. The book was also a finalist for the Donner Prize in the same year.

Lorinc writes on urban affairs, politics, business and technology. He has been a contributor to The Globe and Mail, The Walrus, the Toronto Star, Maclean's, Toronto Life and Spacing. He graduated with a Bachelor of Science from University College, Toronto, in 1987, where he contributed to the University of Toronto student newspaper, The Varsity.

He has also been a two-time Toronto Book Award nominee: in 2016 as co-author (with Michael McClelland, Ellen Scheinberg and Tatum Taylor) of The Ward: The Life and Loss of Toronto’s First Immigrant Neighbourhood, and in 2017 as co-author (with Jane Farrow, Stephanie Chambers, Maureen FitzGerald, Tim McCaskell, Rebecka Sheffield, Tatum Taylor, Rahim Thawer and Ed Jackson) of Any Other Way: How Toronto Got Queer.
