= Mark Sinnett =

Canadian poet, novelist and short story writer

- Born: England
- Occupations: Poet, novelist, short story writer
- Writing career
- Period: 1990s-present
- Notable works: The Landing, The Border Guards, The Carnivore

Mark Sinnett is a Canadian poet, novelist and short story writer. Originally from England, Sinnett moved to Canada as a teenager in 1980. He won the Gerald Lampert Award in 1998 for his poetry collection The Landing, and the Toronto Book Award in 2010 for his novel The Carnivore. He was a shortlisted finalist for the Arthur Ellis Award for Best First Novel in 2005 for his novel The Border Guards.

He is currently based in Kingston, Ontario, where he also works as a real estate agent.

== Works ==
=== Poetry ===
- The Landing (1997, ISBN 978-0886293246)
- Some Late Adventure of the Feelings (2000, ISBN 978-1-55022-410-8)

=== Fiction ===
- Bull (1998, ISBN 978-1895837278)
- The Border Guards (2004, ISBN 978-0002005043)
- The Carnivore (2009, ISBN 978-1-55022-898-4)
