= Anthony De Sa (author) =

Canadian novelist and short story writer

- Occupations: short story writer, novelist
- Writing career
- Period: 2000s–present

Anthony De Sa is a Canadian novelist and short story writer. He graduated from University of Toronto and did his post-graduate work at Queen's University. In 2004, De Sa took a one-year sabbatical and attended the Humber School for Writers. He subsequently submitted Barnacle Love, a volume of linked stories about a Portuguese immigrant family, to publishers, and Random House of Canada published the collection in March 2008. Barnacle Love was a shortlisted finalist for the 2008 Scotiabank Giller Prize. and the 2009 Toronto Book Awards.

De Sa expanded on the story "Shoeshine Boy" from Barnacle Love, set against the 1977 murder of Emanuel Jaques, into a novel. Titled Kicking the Sky, it was published by Doubleday Canada on September 10, 2013.
