= Ann Y. K. Choi =

Canadian author and educator

Ann Y.K. Choi
- Born: Chungju, North Chungcheong Province, South Korea
- Citizenship: Canadian
- Occupations: Author and educator
- Years active: 2010–present
- Notable work: Kay's Lucky Coin Variety Once Upon An Hour All Things Under the Moon
- Website: annykchoi.com

Ann Y.K. Choi is a Korean-Canadian author and educator who was born in Chungju, South Korea, and raised in Toronto, Canada. She is known for her 2016 debut novel Kay's Lucky Coin Variety, her 2020 children's book Once Upon An Hour, and her 2025 novel All Things Under the Moon.

== Early life and education ==
Ann Yu-Kyung Choi immigrated with her family as a child to Toronto, Canada, from Chungju, South Korea, in 1975. Choi attended Oakwood Collegiate Institute in Toronto.

She earned a dual degree in English and sociology from the University of Toronto. At George Brown College, she completed an early childhood education diploma while working at a daycare in the early 1990s. She also studied education at the Ontario Institute for Studies in Education.

Choi studied at the Humber School for Writers, working with David Adams Richards. She also completed the creative writing certificate program at the University of Toronto. She received the Marina Nemat Award in 2012 for the program’s top final manuscript, which was later acquired by Phyllis Bruce at Simon & Schuster Canada. In 2016, Choi completed her Master of Fine Arts in creative writing from National University in San Diego, California.

== Career ==
Prior to becoming an author, Choi worked as a content editor for seven years. She left publishing to pursue a career in education and has been with the York Region District School Board for over nineteen years. She also teaches creative writing at the University of Toronto’s School of Continuing Studies.

Kay's Lucky Coin Variety was published by Simon & Schuster Canada in May 2016. The story, set in downtown Toronto during the late 1980s, was inspired by Choi's own experience working at and living above her family's variety store. It was the first novel about the recent Korean experience in Canada.

Once Upon An Hour, published by Orca Book Publishers, was released in 2020. Toronto-based artist Soyeon Kim was the book’s illustrator. All Things Under the Moon, a historical fiction novel, was published by Simon & Schuster in September 2025.

Choi serves on the program advisory committee for gritLIT, Hamilton's literary festival and has been a University of Toronto alumni mentor for students interested in writing professionally. She has served as a juror for several literary awards and prizes including the Toronto Book Awards and the Writers' Trust Fiction Prize.

Choi also mentors a group of young writers which she founded, called Writers in Trees. The group published an anthology, Forest Floor, in 2025.

== Awards and recognition ==
Kay’s Lucky Coin Variety was a finalist for the Toronto Book Awards. It was also longlisted for the Frank Hegyi Award for Emerging Authors and was a finalist for the Kobo Emerging Writer Prize in the literary fiction category.

Once Upon An Hour was selected as Book-of-the Month by the Festival of Literary Diversity. In 2022, the TD Summer Reading Club selected it as one of their recommended picture books.

The Korean Canadian Heritage Award Committee recognized Choi for outstanding contributions to Korean culture within Canada. The award was presented to her by then-Consul General of South Korea, Kang Jeong-Sik.
