= Crang Plays the Ace =

1987 book

- Author: Jack Batten
- Language: English
- Genre: Mystery fiction, Crime fiction
- Publisher: Macmillan
- Publication date: 1987
- Publication place: Canada
- ISBN: 0887628311
- OCLC: 862103377
- Followed by: Straight No Chaser

Crang Plays the Ace is a mystery fiction novel written by Canadian author Jack Batten. It is his first mystery novel and the first entry in the novel series featuring criminal lawyer Crang.

== Reception ==
David W. Scott of the Ottawa Citizen opined that while Crang is "most unlawyerlike", the novel is "great entertainment." Jerry Petryshyn of the Red Deer Advocate opined that while the plot "has credibility gaps" and "isn't as tight as it could have been", Crang is a "highly likeable character", the setting is "highly recognizable" and the storyline is "good" and "basic". Peter Wilson of the Vancouver Sun praised Batten's "depiction of action" and described Banks as a "likeable, human detective with series potential", but criticised the dialogue. Robert Reid of the Waterloo Region Record called Crang a "Spenser clone" and opined that he "isn't a very convincing lawyer". However, Reid also stated: "Except for the occasional lapse in phrasing, the novel is well written even if it doesn't pack the punch of Parker or Gregory Mcdonald."
