= Queers Against Israeli Apartheid =

LGBTQ protest movement in Canada

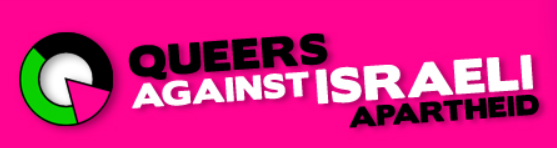
- Abbreviation: QuAIA
- Formation: 2008
- Founded at: Toronto
- Dissolved: February 28, 2015
- Website: queersagainstapartheid.org (archive)

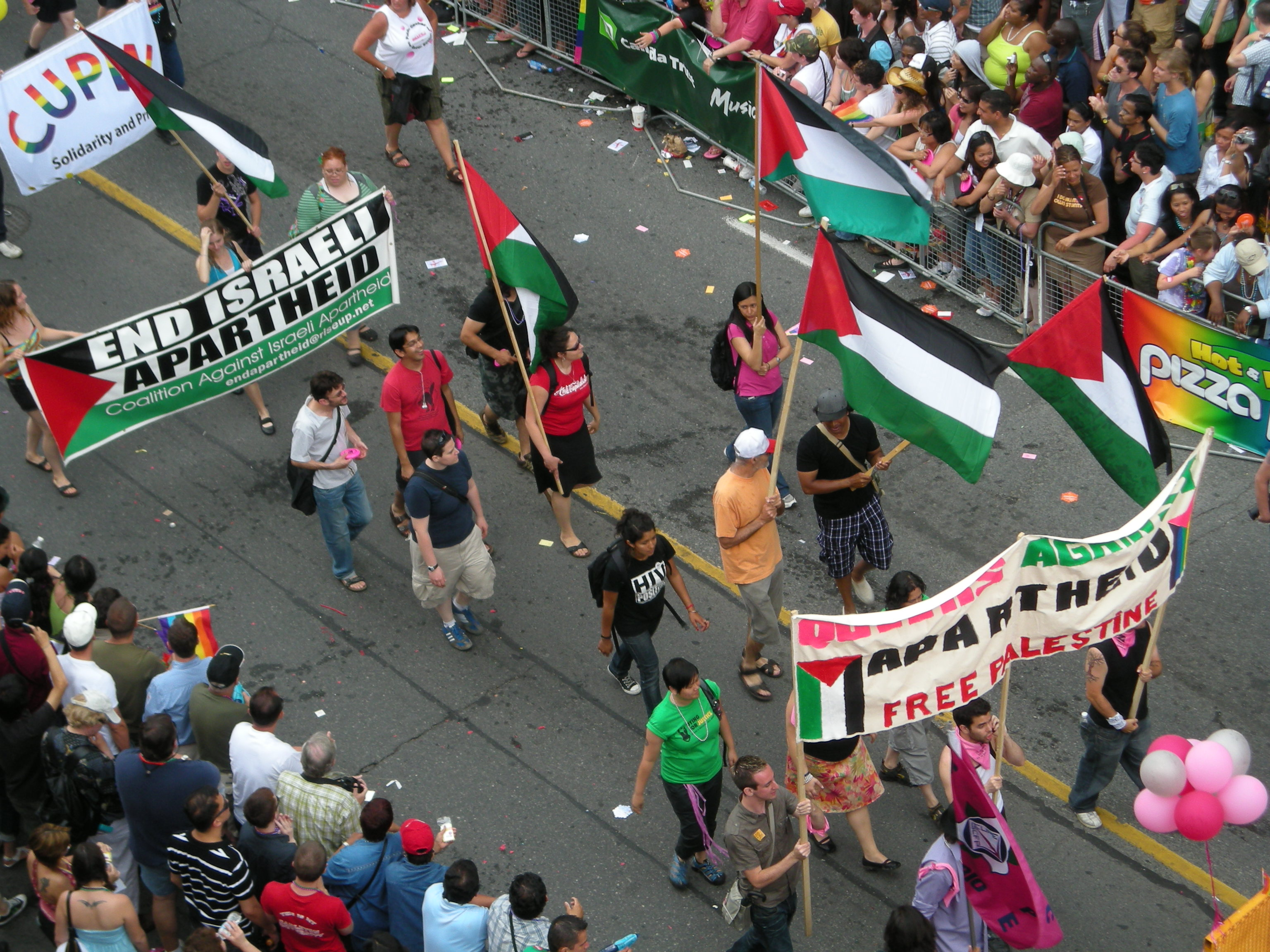
QuAIA marching in the Toronto Pride Parade in 2008

Discussion on Queers Against Israeli Apartheid with Tony Souza on Queer Review.

Queers Against Israeli Apartheid (QuAIA) was a Toronto-based grassroots organization involved in queer and pro-Palestinian activism, including Israeli Apartheid Week and Toronto Pride Week.

Formed in 2008, the group participated in several Toronto Pride parades between 2008 and 2014, despite opposition from pro-Israel activists.

The group announced in February 2015 that it was disbanding after seven years of activity.

== History ==
=== Formation ===
QuAIA formed shortly after the 2008 Israeli Apartheid Week, inspired by a discussion about Israeli pinkwashing. According to its website, it was formed "in solidarity with queers in Palestine".

=== Pride 2010: Banning from parade and fallout ===
In May 2010, the Pride Toronto board banned the phrase "Israeli apartheid" from the parade which meant that QuAIA would be blocked from participating. The decision sparked protests from the local queer community. Around 20 past honorees returned their awards; that year's Grand Marshall Alan Li and Honored Dyke Jane Farrow declined their titles. Additionally, Yakov M. Rabkin, a Canadian history professor, published an op-ed in support of QuAIA's participation in the parade, stating: "By campaigning to ban the QUAIA, they only confirm what many have long suspected: that Israel is indeed an apartheid state." In June, Pride Toronto reversed their decision.

QuAIA marched in the parade on July 4, 2010, along with their allies in the Pride Coalition for Free Speech, largely without incident. Several members of the organization have written from their own perspective how the ban on the phrase "Israeli Apartheid" came to pass in 2010 and was later overturned, as well as an argument written by group spokesperson Tim McCaskell relating QuAIA's politics with his previous solidarity work on behalf of Simon Nkoli, a gay anti-apartheid activist in former apartheid-era South Africa.

After Pride 2010, Gil Troy, professor of History at McGill University, wrote a blogpost calling QuAIA a "perverse group" and comparing them to "Doctors against Anti-Smoking Campaigns or Liberals for Islamism".

=== Pride 2011: City Manager's report and decision to pull out of parade ===
==== City Manager's report ====
On April 13, 2011 the non-partisan Toronto City Manager, Joe Pennachetti, released a report for the City Council Executive Committee concluding that "the participation of QUAIA in the Pride Parade based solely on the phrase 'Israeli Apartheid' does not violate the City's Anti-Discrimination Policy. The City also cannot therefore conclude that the use of term on signs or banners to identify QuAIA constitutes the promotion of hatred or seeks to incite discrimination contrary to the Code."

Speaking to the Toronto Star, QuAIA spokesperson Tim McCaskell stated that the city manager and staff had "obviously done their homework, and talked to lawyers, and not made this a political decision but one that's based on a reasonable look at the facts of the matter and of Canadian law... It basically vindicates everything we've been saying for the last two years." Toronto mayor Rob Ford indicated that he plans to defund the parade regardless of the City Manager report.

==== Pride funding battle ====
Two days later on April 15, 2011, citing the City Manager's report QuAIA announced that it will not march in the 2011 Toronto Pride Parade for the stated purpose of "pos[ing] a challenge for Mayor Rob Ford." QuAIA spokesperson Elle Flanders elaborated by stating "Rob Ford wants to use us as an excuse to cut Pride funding, even though he has always opposed funding the parade, long before we showed up. By holding our Pride events outside of the parade, we are forcing him to make a choice: fund Pride or have your real homophobic, right-wing agenda exposed." QuAIA's press release further stated that the organization would instead host a community event in support of the Boycott, Divestment and Sanctions campaign.

The announcement was generally considered a surprise, even by media that had been following the story closely. According to the Toronto Star, "QuAIA's decision [not to march] represents a significant tactical shift for the group, which fought intensely last year for the right to participate in Pride."

At a May 24, 2011 meeting of the executive committee, City Hall voted unanimously to accept the city manager's report, which made it likely that Pride Toronto would receive funding Deputations were given on the issue by over 50 speakers, which included QuAIA itself that had made a short video specifically for the purpose. The video can be seen here.

==== Alternative plans to parade ====
In mid June it was revealed that the community event QuAIA planned to host would feature prominent writer and anti-AIDS activist Sarah Schulman speaking in favor of the boycott, divestment and sanctions (BDS) campaign from an LGBT perspective. The event was held June 22, 2011 at Toronto's historic Gladstone Hotel.

The following evening, June 23, a second event was held that featured Sarah Schulman speaking on her history of fighting homophobia and AIDS activism in the ACT UP! organization in New York City. The second event was cosponsored with numerous queer and AIDS activist organizations.

During her visit, Schulman was also interviewed by local queer media Xtra!, primarily focusing on how she came to support the BDS campaign as a queer activist.

In lieu of participation in the actual Parade, QuAIA dropped a 40-foot banner from above Toronto's Wellesley subway station promoting a campaign to boycott LGBT leisure tourism to Israel. The banner drop occurred on July 3, the day of the 2011 Pride Parade, in the heart of Toronto's historic LGBT district. The banner read "Support Palestinian Queers, Boycott Israeli Tourism."

=== Pride 2012: Return to Pride parade ===
In June 2012, the Toronto city council voted to condemn the phrase "Israeli apartheid," as part of a resolution recognizing the gay Pride Toronto parade as a "significant cultural event that strongly promotes the ideals of tolerance and diversity." The resolution said it slams the term Israel Apartheid for undermining the values of Pride and diminishing "the suffering experienced by individuals during the apartheid regime in South Africa."

Pride Toronto's Dispute Resolution Committee, composed of lawyers with experience in arbitration and mediation in human rights matters, rejected a complaint against QuAIA by B'nai Brith Canada that sought to ban the group from the parade. The panel dismissed the complaint, stating that "the activities of QUAIA are not contrary to the core missions or policies of Pride Toronto," and that it is "not likely to present images or messages that promote, condone or may promote or condone violence, hatred, degradation or negative stereotypes of a person or group, contrary to the City of Toronto's Anti-Discrimination Policy."

=== Pride 2013: City staff reports and further Pride funding debates ===
==== City staff reports ====
In response to a September 10, 2012 request from Toronto city council's executive committee, city staff released a series of three reports on April 9, 2013, regarding the city's anti-discrimination policy and grants policy . These staff reports built on and largely reiterated the 2011 report from the city manager. Regarding the city's grants policy, one of these reports stated:

On June 14, 2011, City Council considered City staff's conclusions that neither QuAIA's participation itself, nor its signs or banners, violated the City's anti-discrimination policies and do not appear to violate the Ontario Human Rights Code. For that reason, Council was advised that there were no grounds to withdraw City funding for Pride in order to prevent or restrict QuAIA's participation based on the anti-discrimination policy. Nor was there a policy rationale to justify the imposition of the condition that the term "Israeli Apartheid" not be permitted at a City-funded event on City property. This conclusion and advice remains appropriate in the view of staff.

QuAIA's Tim McCaskell was quoted in response saying, "The law is clear to everyone except a handful of right-wing councillors: you can't ban the phrase 'Israeli apartheid.'" Meanwhile, Councillor James Pasternak was quoted, "Stopping QuAIA is like trying to hammer jelly against the wall."

It was also pointed out in the media that no such funding restrictions had been attempted against the Art Gallery of Ontario or Toronto International Film Festival, which had also held events at which the phrase "Israeli Apartheid" was supposedly employed. Finally, the third report in the series from city staff was not publicly released, but dealt with "litigation or potential litigation affecting the City of Toronto," according to its author Chris Brillinger, executive director of social development, finance and administration for the city.

==== Executive committee deputations and motion to defer ====
At an April 23, 2013 meeting, the city's executive committee heard deputations from 27 individuals, most of whom reportedly spoke in favor of recommendations from city staff. This included one Holocaust Survivor, Suzanne Weiss, who stated, "A sweeping ban on disrespectful speech will threaten every citizen's rights." Meanwhile, national director of legal affairs for B'nai Brith Canada, Anita Bromberg, argued instead that the parade is not a political demonstration, saying, "This is a city-wide celebration. I am deeply offended."

QuAIA member Elle Flanders spoke on her experience living in Ramallah for a year, saying, "My partner and I traveled every day for six months on a segregated road system; they are known as the apartheid roads because they are segregated by your ethnic identity. Roads for Jewish Israelis, roads for Palestinians."

CEO and director of Toronto International Film Festival (TIFF) also commented on the issue; discussing the usage of the phrase 'Israeli Apartheid' at TIFF, he said

As long as something is not hate speech, that's all we are concerned about, and there are already laws around that. . . The festival is about open dialogue, open conversation and providing new avenues to understand extremely complicated situations, and we are fully in favour of that. . . We obviously want to talk to Councillor Shiner and some of the other city councillors about what the intent of their motion would be, and hopefully it will not pass. I hope good sense will prevail."

However, following a motion from Councillor David Shiner, the committee voted to defer recommendations from city staff until a May 28 meeting, after which the item could proceed to full council in June. In response, Councillor Kristyn Wong-Tam was quoted as saying, "Perhaps what [Councillor James Pasternak and Shiner] are trying to do is mobilize and organize the opposing side... We have Councillor Pasternak, who is actively trying to defund Pride, who is actively lobbying councillors to swing his way. So this could be the political strategy he needs to defund Pride."

In the aftermath of the deferred motion, Councilor Pasternak suggested that instead of facing the possibility of being defunded, Pride should be offered the possibility of additional funding if it chooses to ban QuAIA from participation in the Pride festival. Acknowledging there was reluctance on the part of city council to defund Pride, Pasternak stated, "What you do is allow Pride to keep their existing grant and provide a diversity bonus after the parade should QuAIA not participate. So we are changing the conversation to a diversity bonus." Pride co-chair Francisco Alvarez responded by calling the offer, "desperate and insincere."

==== Parade and Aftermath ====
Ultimately, QuAIA was allowed to participate in the parade. Frank Dimant, then CEO of B'nai Brith Canada, lobbied local politicians in opposition to Pride Toronto and QuAIA. He told Xtra: "Saying 'apartheid' is anti-Semitic; it's vile... The gay parade was initially conceived as a celebration. I don't think it should be politicized."

=== Pride 2014 ===
In 2014, QuAIA marched unopposed as pro-Israel activists decided that the controversy was giving the group undue publicity.

=== Disbanding ===
In February 2015, QuAIA announced that it was disbanding.

== Campaigns and activism ==
=== LGBT tourism boycott ===
In September 2009, a statement was released on the QuAIA website calling for a boycott of LGBT leisure tourism to Israel. This campaign was prominently promoted in a banner drop at the 2011 Pride Parade.

=== Freedom Flotilla ===
Filmmaker and QuAIA member John Greyson has been listed as one of the participants in the 2011 Freedom Flotilla II. Greyson was reported to be a passenger aboard the Canadian boat "Tahrir." Greyson's participation in the Flotilla came to the public spotlight in the aftermath of a hoax video in which an Israeli actor claimed that gays weren't welcome to participate in the flotilla.

== Cultural events ==
At the 2011 Inside Out LGBT film festival QuAIA jointly sponsored a program consisting of film shorts produced by artists in Lebanon, Palestine and their diasporas. The program was titled "With Love from Le(z)Banon and Pa(lez)tine" and was followed by a talk by Professor Samar Habib on queer representation in Egyptian cinema. QuAIA co-sponsored the program with Queer Ontario. Local Toronto alternative media company Deviant Productions conducted an interview with Professor Habib after the event, in which she further discussed queer representation in Arab cinema.

In 2013, QuAIA partnered with the Toronto Palestine Film Festival to present lesbian filmmaker Barbara Hammer's Witness: Palestine, which Hammer had created in response to her experiences on the first LGBTQ Solidarity Tour of Palestine in 2012. The film was presented at Toronto's Images Festival.
