= Carolyn Whitzman =

- Born: 1963 (age 62–63); Cornwall, Ontario, Canada
- Education: Concordia University (BA (hons)); University of Toronto (MA); McMaster University (PhD)
- Occupations: Urban planner and author
- Years active: 1989–present
- Organization: University of Toronto
- Notable work: The Handbook of Community Safety, Gender, and Violence Prevention: Practical Planning Tools

Carolyn Whitzman (born 1963) is a Canadian urban planner, community activist and author. She is a leading Canadian authority on housing and has worked in non-profit, government and academic sectors. She has received several awards for her work, and is the author of several books and peer-reviewed papers, also writing regularly for media outlets on these topics.

== Career ==
Whitzman began her career in 1989 working for the Municipal government of Toronto to prevent gender-related violence. She completed dozens of projects particularly focused on improving women's safety in public spaces.

From 2003 to 2019 she was a professor of Urban Planning at the University of Melbourne in Victoria, Australia. This included addressing the 2016 Habitat III Conference in Quito, Ecuador.

Whitzman recently began writing fiction books based on her findings and work in planning and housing. Her book Clara at the Door with a Revolver, about Clara Ford, a Black tailor and single mother accused of murder in 1894, was a finalist in the 2023 Toronto Book Awards.

Her career has focused on housing policy and practice in cities and its connections to how marginalised and disadvantaged groups use and interact with their urban environments.

== Bibliography ==
- Whitzman, Carolyn (2024). Home truths: fixing Canada's housing crisis. Vancouver: On Point Press. ISBN 9780774890700.
- Whitzman, Carolyn (2023). Clara at the door with a revolver: the scandalous Black suspect, the exemplary White son, and the murder that shocked Toronto. Vancouver ; Toronto: On Point Press, a UBC Press imprint. ISBN 9780774890618.
- Building inclusive cities: women's safety and the right to the city. New York: Routledge. 2013. ISBN 9780415628167.
- Whitzman, Carolyn (2009). Suburb, Slum, Urban Village. UBC Press. ISBN 9780774815369.
- Whitzman, Carolyn (2008). The Handbook of Community Safety Gender and Violence Prevention: Practical Planning Tools. Hoboken: Routledge. ISBN 9781844075010.
