= Straight No Chaser (novel) =

1989 book

- Author: Jack Batten
- Language: English
- Genre: Mystery fiction, Crime fiction
- Publisher: Macmillan
- Publication date: 1989
- Publication place: Canada
- ISBN: 0771594402
- OCLC: 862103491
- Preceded by: Crang Plays the Ace
- Followed by: Riviera Blues

Straight No Chaser is a mystery fiction novel written by Canadian author Jack Batten. It is the second entry in the novel series featuring criminal lawyer Crang.

== Reception ==
Doug Williamson of the Windsor Star stated: "Although Strait No Chase is not meant to be anything more than entertaining, it achieves this goal masterfully." Williamson opined that while Batten's writing is "a bit forced at times", it is largely "smooth, hip and entertaining." Peter Wilson of the Vancouver Sun called the novel "fun to read" and a "solid sign of the healthy, growing, Canadian crime fiction industry." Jenni Mortin of The StarPhoenix called it a "wild and woolly book which stars a hero who is both naive and swinging, and whose every step takes him deeper into a quagmire." Burt Heward of the Ottawa Citizen called it "entertaining" if "loosey-goosey" and criticised some of the dialogue between Crang and his girlfriend as "tiresome".
