= Jael Richardson =

Canadian writer and broadcaster

Jael Ealey Richardson is a Canadian writer and broadcaster. The daughter of former Canadian Football League quarterback Chuck Ealey, she is best known for The Stone Thrower, a book about her father which has been published both as an adult memoir in 2012 and as an illustrated children's book in 2015.

She has also written the theatrical play my upside down black face, which was excerpted in T-Dot Griots: An Anthology of Toronto's Black Storytellers.

An MFA graduate of the University of Guelph, she is the cofounder and artistic director of Brampton, Ontario's annual Festival of Literary Diversity, and has served as a writer in residence for the Toronto District School Board. She is a regular contributor of book reviews to CBC Radio One's arts magazine series Q, has served as a guest host of Q, and was cohost with Shelagh Rogers of the network's broadcast of the 2017 and 2018 Scotiabank Giller Prize galas.

Her debut novel, Gutter Child, was published in 2021, and was shortlisted for the Amazon.ca First Novel Award. The novel was also included in the Writers' Trust of Canada new program, WT Amplified Voices, which promotes books with BIPOC authors that were released during the pandemic, as well as nominated for Forest of Reading's White Pine Award for 2022. Audible, in an effort to promote Canadian writers, also included Richardson in their series of Canadian Audible Originals.

== Awards ==
Year	Work	Award	Category	Result	Ref.
2021	Gutter Child	Amazon.ca First Novel Award	—	Shortlisted	
2022	Gutter Child	White Pine Award	—	Shortlisted	

== Biblio ==
- —— (2012). The Stone Thrower (hardcover 1st ed.). Thomas Allen Publishers. ISBN 9781771022057.
- —— (2021). Gutter Child: A Novel (hardcover 1st ed.). HarperCollins.
- —— (2022). Because You Are (hardcover 1st ed.). Orca Book Publishers.
- —— (2023). The Hockey Jersey (hardcover 1st ed.). Orca Book Publishers.
