= Kim Echlin =

Canadian novelist, translator, editor and teacher

- Born: 1955 (age 70–71); Burlington, Ontario, Canada
- Education: McGill University, Paris-Sorbonne University, York University (PhD)
- Occupations: Novelist, translator, editor and teacher
- Employer: University of Toronto
- Writing career
- Genre: Literary fiction

Kim Echlin (born 1955) is a Canadian novelist, translator, editor and teacher. She has a PhD in English literature for a thesis about the translation of the Ojibway Nanabush myths. Echlin has worked for CBC Television and several universities. She currently works as a creative writing instructor at the University of Toronto School for Continuing Studies. Her 2009 novel, The Disappeared, featured on the shortlist for the 2009 Scotiabank Giller Prize.

== Early life and education ==
Kim Echlin was born in Burlington, Ontario, in 1955. While attending Aldershot High School, Echlin's writing was noticed by her English teacher. She studied at McGill University and Paris-Sorbonne University, before completing a PhD in English literature at York University, writing a thesis about the translation of the Ojibway Nanabush myths.

== Career ==
Echlin is a writer, journalist and educator. She has worked as an arts producer for CBC Television's The Journal and has taught journalism and creative writing at a number of Canadian universities. She is currently a creative writing instructor at University of Toronto School for Continuing Studies, and previously taught at the University of Alberta Women and Words Conference. She was the Mabel Pugh Taylor Writer-in-Residence at McMaster University and the Hamilton Public Library in 2015–16.

Echlin is a founding trustee of the Loran Scholars Foundation. She is a board member of El Hogar Projects, Canada.

== Writing ==
Elephant Winter, the story of a young woman who returns to her rural Ontario home to tend to her dying mother and finds her life altered due to a romantic relationship with a wildlife caretaker at a neighboring safari park. The book was described as "enormously engaging" by Maureen Garvie in Quill & Quire. Frank Moher further observed in a Saturday Night review of the novel that Sophie's growing empathy is reflected by "prose that is as extravagant in feeling as it is in expression". Kirkus Reviews described the book as a "sometimes emotionally scattered debut" but praised it for its "intriguing lore".

Echlin draws on the ancient myths of Demeter and Persephone, as well as on the story of Inanna, in her second novel, Dagmar's Daughter, in which a motherless teen is almost drowned before finding safety on a small island. The woman's story is interwoven with those of three generations of gifted Gaelic-speaking women into a novel that, although difficult, "rewards the effort", according to Canadian Woman Studies reviewer Clara Thomas. Noting that the novel's plot moves at a brisk pace, Elaine Jones added in Resource Links that Dagmar's Daughter relates "a powerful and intriguing story".

Echlin has adapted the ancient Sumerian myth of Inanna for an illustrated book, Inanna: From the Myths of Ancient Sumer, published in 2003. Associated with the planet Venus, Inanna is an ancient goddess that figured prominently in the civilization that existed in the location of modern-day Iraq over four thousand years ago. Although lost for centuries, her stories, carved on stone tablets, were recently recovered by archeologists. Sister to Gilgamesh, Inanna grows to maturity and through her determination, wisdom, and ambition she learns the extent of her own destructive and creative powers. In Inanna Echlin relates the warrior goddess's story in poetic form, from her birth as the daughter of the moon god to her growing desire for her handsome shepherd brother Dumuzi, her death and descent into the underworld, and her fight to regain her place on Earth as well as her power within the pantheon of Sumerian gods. Noting that the book, which is illustrated by European artist Linda Wolfsgruber, would be most valuable to young-adult readers, Patricia D. Lothrop wrote in School Library Journal that Inanna "could be an enticing introduction to a little-known figure from ancient Near East myth". In crafting her book-length story, Echlin positions traditional stories about the goddess "in chronological order, following Inanna's development from an eager, ambitious goddess to the position of the all-powerful queen whose 'light shines through everything,'" according to Resource Links contributor Joan Marshall. Marshall dubbed the book a "fascinating tale of a young goddess who knows how to get the power she wants".

Echlin's 2009 novel, The Disappeared was shortlisted for the 2009 Scotiabank Giller Prize. The Disappeared deals with Cambodian genocide and its connection to Canadian history.

Under the Visible Life was published in 2015. The Globe and Mail called it "a love song to music itself," while Khaled Hosseini, author of The Kite Runner, said "this story of motherhood and friendship, anchored by two extraordinary heroines, will stay with me for a long time.” In 2015, Echlin also published Inanna: A New English Version, a new translation of the Inanna myth with extensive linguistic and cultural notes.

Speak, Silence was published in 2021 and won the 2021 Toronto Book Award. Weaving a fiction story against the Bosnian war crimes trial at the Hague, the Toronto Book Award jury described Speak, Silence as 'impeccably researched' and as 'a story of tragedy and community rebuilding that hooks the reader from the beginning to the last page.' Speak, Silence is also among ten finalists for the 2022 Evergreen award, run by Forest of Reading

In Katherine Ashenburg's extensive review of Echlin's fiction work in the Literary Review of Canada, she wrote: "Echlin’s books, difficult as their subjects can be, are much more than worth the pain. Beyond their considerable literary merit and pleasure, they offer a richer, deeper, truer entrée than non-fiction can provide into happenings we would often prefer to ignore. They give us a peerless chance to listen."

== List of works ==
=== Books ===
- Elephant Winter (1997), ISBN 978-0143170587
- Dagmar's Daughter (2001), ISBN 978-0143170594
- Inanna: From the Myths of Ancient Sumer (2003), ISBN 978-0888994967
- Elizabeth Smart: A Fugue Essay on Women and Creativity (2004), ISBN 978-0889614420
- The Disappeared (2009), ISBN 978-0143170457
- Under the Visible Life (2015), ISBN 978-1781255803
- Inanna: A New English Version (2015), ISBN 978-0143194583
- Speak, Silence (2021), ISBN 978-0735240612
- Tell Others (2026), ISBN 978-0670065318

=== Other writing ===
- (Translator and editor with Nie Zhixiong) Yuan Ke, Dragons and Dynasties: An Introduction to Chinese Mythology (London: Penguin, 1991), ISBN 978-0140586534
- (Editor) To Arrive Where You Are: Literary Journalism from the Banff Centre for the Arts (Banff, Alberta: Banff Centre Press, 1999), ISBN 978-0920159712
- (Co-translator) Rasha Omran, Defy the Silence (Hamilton: Hamilton Arts & Letters, 2018), ISBN 978-0993721328

== Awards and honors ==
- 2022: Nominated: Evergreen Book Award, Forest of Reading, for Speak, Silence
- 2021: 1st Prize, Toronto Book Awards for Speak, Silence
- 2011: 1st Prize: Barnes and Noble Discovery Writer for The Disappeared
- 2011: Nominated (long list): Impac Dublin Literary Award for The Disappeared
- 2009: Nominated: Scotiabank Giller Prize for The Disappeared
- 2006: 1st Prize for Creative Non-Fiction, CBC/Air Canada Literary Awards: for I, Witness (on the Cambodian genocide).
- 1997: Torgi Award, for Elephant Winter
- 1997: Nominated, Chapters/Books in Canada First Novel Award for Elephant Winter
- 1986: Nominated, National Magazine Award for Travel Writing for "Island Sacrifices"
