= Kristen den Hartog =

Canadian writer

- Born: 1965 (age 60–61); Deep River, Ontario, Canada
- Occupations: Novelist; memoirist
- Writing career
- Period: 2001–present
- Genres: Fiction; Memoir
- Notable works: Water Wings (2001); The Perpetual Ending (2003); Origin of Haloes (2005); And Me Among Them (2011)
- Notable awards: Finalist — Toronto Book Awards (The Perpetual Ending, 2003)

Kristen den Hartog (born 1965) is a Canadian fiction and memoir writer. She is the author of four novels; And Me Among Them, her most recent, was published in 2011.

Den Hartog was born in Deep River, Ontario.

The 2003 novel The Perpetual Ending was a finalist for the Toronto Book Awards.

Den Hartog lives in Ontario, with homes in Toronto and the Ottawa Valley.

== Bibliography ==
=== Fiction ===
- —— (2001). Water Wings (hardcover 1st ed.). Toronto: Knopf Canada. ISBN 9780676972894.
- —— (2003). The Perpetual Ending (paperback 1st ed.). Toronto: Knopf Canada. ISBN 9780676974577.
- —— (2005). Origin of Haloes (hardcover ed.). Toronto: McClelland and Stewart. ISBN 9780771026201.
- —— (2011). And Me Among Them (paperback 1st ed.). Calgary: Freehand Books. ISBN 9781554810543.

=== Non-fiction ===
- The Occupied Garden: A Family Memoir of War-Torn Holland. Toronto: McClelland and Stewart, 2009.
