= Marjorie Harris =

Canadian writer (born 1937)

Marjorie Harris (born 15 September 1937) is a Canadian writer of non-fiction, particularly in gardening.

== Early life ==
Marjorie Kathleen Harris (née Stibbards) was born in Shaunavon, Saskatchewan, the eldest of three children of Bernard and Kay Stibbards. Her father's work as a Baptist minister led the family to move to many different places over the years, including Goose Bay, Labrador, and Vancouver, British Columbia. During the Second World War, she lived with her mother and siblings in Winnipeg, while her father was overseas as an air force chaplain. She attended McMaster University in Hamilton, Ontario, and graduated with a B.A. in English in 1959.

== Writing career ==
Harris's writing career began when she began working for Maclean's magazine in 1966. She went on to be a freelance journalist for Saturday Night, Chatelaine, Weekend, The Canadian, Artscanada, Quest, Toronto Life, Financial Post magazine, Flare, and the Toronto Star, writing on topics including design, art, and feminism. In the 1970s, she was associate editor at Chatelaine for several years.

In 1988, she decided to focus her writing on gardening and plants, and began to write articles on the subject for the Toronto Star and Toronto Life. For her first gardening book, The Canadian Gardener, published in 1990, she and photographer Tim Saunders travelled across Canada, talking to dozens of gardeners to get their best advice.

She was editor-in-chief of Gardening Life magazine and wrote regular columns on gardening for The Globe and Mail. Much of her writing has focused on her own garden in midtown Toronto, a narrow plot that she has cultivated carefully to make the most of the space. She strongly promotes ecological gardening principles and growing native plants that are adapted to Canadian conditions.

== Broadcasting career ==
Harris has written and produced documentaries for CBC radio. She had a radio host job at CBC Radio's Metro Morning as "The Urban Gardener". For many years, she was a regular guest on This Country in the Morning hosted by Peter Gzowski, a popular CBC radio program. In 2003, she appeared in the Recreating Eden TV series episode "A Perfect Life". Harris has also created several short videos for YouTube aimed at home gardeners and contributed gardening advice to CBC Life.

== Archives ==
The McMaster university library acquired Marjorie Harris's archives in July 2005 and March 2006. She was honoured there in 2007 with an exhibition titled "Marjorie Harris's Garden of the World".

== Awards ==
McMaster University Distinguished Alumni Award

== Personal life ==
Her first marriage was to television producer and musician Barry Harris; she has two children, Christopher and Jennifer. Currently, she lives in Toronto with her second husband, writer Jack Batten.
