= Catherine Bush =

Canadian novelist

Catherine Bush is a Canadian novelist.

== Biography ==
Born in Toronto and educated at the University of Toronto Schools, she attended Yale University, graduating with a Bachelor of Arts in Comparative Literature.

Her debut novel, Minus Time (1993), was shortlisted for the Books in Canada First Novel Award and the City of Toronto Book Award. It was also published in the U.S. and the U.K.

The Rules of Engagement (HarperCollins, 2000), a national bestseller, was published internationally, shortlisted for the City of Toronto Book Award, and chosen as a New York Times Notable Book and a Best Book of the Year by the Los Angeles Times and The Globe and Mail.

Claire's Head (M&S, 2004) was shortlisted for the Trillium Award and chosen as a Best Book of the Year by The Globe and Mail.

Accusation (Goose Lane, 2013) was one of NOW magazine's Best Ten Books of 2013 and an Amazon.ca Best Book of the Year.

Blaze Island (Goose Lane, 2020) was a Globe & Mail Best Book of the Year and the Hamilton Reads 2021 Pick.

Bush has taught Creative Writing at universities including Concordia and the University of Florida. She is an associate professor of Creative Writing at the University of Guelph and was the Coordinator of the University of Guelph Creative Writing MFA, located in Toronto, from 2008 to 2022.

She has been Writer-in-Residence at McMaster University, the University of New Brunswick, the University of Alberta, and the University of Guelph and a fellow at the MacDowell Colony, Yaddo, and the Fine Arts Work Center in Provincetown, among others. Most recently she was a Fiction Meets Science Fellow at the Hanse-Wissenschaftskolleg/Institute of Advanced Study in Delmenhorst, Germany. She has written and spoken internationally about addressing the climate crisis in fiction.

Her nonfiction has appeared in numerous publications including Emergence, Noema, The Globe and Mail, The New York Times Magazine, and Best Canadian Essays.

== Bibliography ==
- Minus Time (1993)
- The Rules of Engagement (2000)
- Claire's Head (2004)
- Accusation (2013)
- Blaze Island (2020)
- Skin (2025)
