= Joe Fiorito =

Canadian journalist and author

- Born: 1948 (age 77–78); Fort William (Thunder Bay), Ontario
- Occupation: Newspaper columnist
- Writing career
- Period: 1996-2017
- Genre: Essays
- Notable work: The Song Beneath the Ice
- Notable awards: 1996 National Newspaper Award; 2003 Toronto Book Award

Joe Fiorito is a Canadian journalist and author.

== Early life ==
Fiorito was born June 22, 1948, in Fort William, Ontario. He is third generation Italian-Canadian whose Italian family hails from Ripabottoni, in Molise.

His father was a mailman and a musician and his mother was a waitress. He had three brothers. He wrote about his family life in the acclaimed memoir, "The Closer We Are To Dying".

== Career ==
After working for several years in community development, he joined the CBC in 1980 as the manager of CFFB Radio in Frobisher Bay, now Iqaluit. He then worked as a CBC Radio producer in Regina from 1985 to 1991. While at the CBC, he was president of his union local and in 1998 he was elected president of the National Radio Producers' Association.

He left the CBC to become a freelance journalist in Montreal, where he was a columnist for HOUR magazine, and the Montreal Gazette. He won a National Newspaper Award for his Gazette columns in 1995.

He moved to Toronto in 1997, where he wrote city columns for the National Post, The Globe and Mail and The Toronto Star. His columns focussed on the small details of daily life, with a particular focus on social housing, mental health issues, addictions, and poverty. His column about the eviction and subsequent death of a tenant in community housing led to a public inquiry and a series of reforms in the treatment of elderly tenants in community housing in Toronto.

== Personal life ==
Fiorito is married to Susan Mahoney. His son, Matt, is a punk musician in Vancouver.

Regarding his Italian roots, Fiorotto had this to say in an interview with italocanadese.com, "My heritage is a faded fresco; I’m third generation. But I have the legacy of the stories of the old days, and I am loyal to the plate on my table. What is clear and indelible, however, is the link to the village of my grandparents – Ripabottoni, in Molise, is the fountain of all of us with the last name Fiorito. Frankly, my last name tends to tie some people in knots, and so it is a test, but it is also an identifier: a guy in Milan, on hearing my name said, “Oh, a peasant.” Anywhere I am, I am never unaware of who I am."

== Awards and honours ==
- 1995 - National Newspaper Award for columns
- 2000 - Brassani Prize for Short Fiction
- 2001 - Acerbi Prize nomination
- 2003 - Toronto Book Award for The Song Beneath the Ice
- 2010 - Al Gosling Award
- 2011 - R. Gordon Bell Award
- 2012 - Canadian Helen Keller Centre Award
- 2021 - The Kouhi Award

== Bibliography ==
- Comfort Me with Apples (Nuage Editions, 1994 columns; updated McClelland & Stewart, 2000)
- Tango on the Main (Nuage Editions, 1996 columns)
- The Closer We Are to Dying (McClelland & Stewart, 1999) - memoir
- The Song Beneath the Ice (M&S 2002 novel)
- Union Station (M&S 2006 non-fiction)
- Rust Is A Form of Fire (Guernica Editions 2015 poetry)
- The Life Crimes and Hard Times of Ricky Atkinson, Leader of the Dirty Tricks Gang (Exile Editions 2017 co-author)
- City Poems (Exile Editions 2018 poetry)
- All I Have Learned Is Where I Have Been (Signal Editions 2020 poetry)
