= Paul Kropp =

Canadian author, publisher and educator

Paul Stephen Kropp (February 22, 1948 – August 22, 2015) was an American-born Canadian author, publisher and educator.

Paul Kropp was born and raised in Buffalo, New York and received a BA from Columbia University in New York. In 1970, he came to Canada and completed an MA at the University of Western Ontario. He began teaching at a vocational school in Hamilton where he recognized that there were very few books his students were interested in and able to read.That launched his career as an author. His first book, Burn Out, was aimed at reluctant readers.

Kropp has written over sixty YA (Young Adult) novels as well as Make Your Child a Reader for Life, The Lost Botticelli and other titles for adult readers. as His books have been translated into German, Danish, French, Portuguese and Spanish and have won awards in Canada and internationally. But he remains best known for his high-interest, low-vocabulary ("hi-lo") books for struggling and reluctant readers.

Paul was a founding member and past president of the Canadian Society of Children's Authors, Illustrators, & Performers.

In 2002, Paul Kropp established High Interest Publishing (HIP Books), a niche publisher of high-Interest, low-vocabulary novels for adolescents and teens. He remained the President and General Editor of the company until his death in 2015.

== Selected work ==
- Ghost House (High Interest Publishing)
- Juvie (High Interest Publishing)
- Avalanche (High Interest Publishing)
- Moonkid and Liberty (1988)
- Running the Bases
- Ellen/Elena/Luna (1992), nominated for a Toronto Book Award
- How to Make Your Child a Reader for Life (1993)
- Moonkid and Prometheus (1997)
- The Lost Botticelli (2014)
