= James King (writer) =

Canadian writer, biographer, academic

James King is a writer and former academic specializing in art history and biography. He is Professor Emeritus of English at McMaster University.

== Education ==
King has a Bachelor's degree from the University of Toronto and a M.A. and Ph.D. from Princeton University.

== Career ==
King taught English literature, creative writing, and art history at McMaster University.

== Honours ==
1980-81: John Simon Guggenheim Memorial Fellow

1988-90: Killam Research Fellow

1988: The Yorkshire Post Arts Award: given for 'the finest book devoted to art history published during 1987': awarded for Interior Landscapes: A Life of Paul Nash

1991: Finalist for the Governor General's prize for non-fiction (The Last Modern: A Life of Herbert Read)

1993: Elected to the Royal Society of Canada

1995: Virginia Woolf selected one of the best non-fiction books published in the United States during 1995 by Publishers Weekly

1995- : Listing in Who's Who in Canada

1996: Virginia Woolf: Best Book, Hamilton & Region Arts Council [given to the Penguin edition]

1997: The Life of Margaret Laurence: finalist for CBA Non-Fiction Book of the Year; National Bestseller; Vintage Canada edition: August 1998

1998: The Life of Margaret Laurence: Literary Award for 1997 for Non Fiction Book, Hamilton & Region Arts Council

2011: Étienne's Alphabet shortlisted for the Toronto Book Award

2015: Old Masters shortlisted for the Trillium Award

2016: Inner Places, The Life of David Milne won the Hamilton Literary Award for best non-fiction book

== Works ==
=== Fiction ===
Faking. Toronto: The Dundurn Group, 1999. French translation published by XYZ Montreal in Autumn 2001

Blue Moon. Toronto: The Dundurn Group 2000

Transformations. Toronto: Cormorant, 2003

Pure Inventions. Toronto: Cormorant, 2006

Ếtienne's Alphabet. Toronto: Cormorant, 2010

Old Masters. Toronto, Cormorant, 2014

=== Non-Fiction ===
William Cowper: A Biography. Durham: Duke University Press, 1986.

Interior Landscapes: A Life of Paul Nash. London: Weidenfeld & Nicolson, 1987.

The Last Modern: A Life of Herbert Read. London: Weidenfeld & Nicolson and New York: St Martin's Press, 1990.

William Blake: His Life. London: Weidenfeld & Nicolson and New York: St Martin's Press, 1991. London: Weidenfeld Paperbacks, 1992. New York: St Martin's Press (paperback edition), 1992.

Virginia Woolf. London: Hamish Hamilton, 1994; New York: W.W. Norton, 1995; London: Penguin Books, 1995.

The Life of Margaret Laurence. Toronto: Alfred A. Knopf Canada, 1997; Vintage edition, 1998.

Telling Lives or Telling Lies?: Biography and Fiction. Lethbridge: University of Lethbridge Press, 1997. [Text of the F.L. Priestley Memorial Lecture from 1996]

Jack, A Life with Writers: The Story of Jack McClelland. Toronto: Alfred A. Knopf, 1999. Vintage: 2000. Chinese translation published in 2002 by Chongqing Publishing House.

Farley: The Life of Farley Mowat. Toronto: Harper Collins Canada, 2002; American edition published by Steerforth Press, 2003.

Japanese Warrior Prints, 1646-1905. Leiden: Hotei, 2007. Co-author with Yuriko Iwakiri.

Beyond the Great Wave: The Japanese Landscape Print, 1727-1960. Bern: Peter Lang: 2010.

Under Foreign Eyes: Western Cinematic Adaptations of Postwar Japan. Winchester and Washington: Zero Books: 2011.

Inward Journey: The Life of Lawren Harris. Toronto: Thomas Allen, 2012.

Inner Places: The Life of David Milne. Toronto: Dundurn, 2015.

Roland Penrose: The Life of a Surrealist. Edinburgh: Edinburgh University Press, 2017.

The Way It Is: The Life of Greg Curnoe. Toronto: Dundurn, 2017.

Bertram Brooker: Life and Art. On-line book published October 2018. Toronto: Art Canada Institute, 2018.

Michael Snow: Lives and Works. Toronto: Dundurn, 2019.

Early Snow: Michael Snow 1947-1962. Hamilton and Vancouver: Art Gallery of Hamilton and Figure 1, 2019.

Paul Nash as Designer and Illustrator. London: Lund Humphries, 2022.

E. McKnight Kauffer: The Artist as Designer. New York, Peter Lang, 2025.

'Our Little Gang': The Lives of the Vorticists. London: Reaktion Books, 2025.

Edward Burtynsky: The Biography. Toronto: Sutherland House, 2026.

The Rhythm of Eternity: The Life and Art of Rockwell Kent. New York, Peter Lang, 2026.

=== Editions ===
Co-editor, The Letters and Prose Writings of William Cowper (Volume 1: Adelphi and Letters, 1750–81). Pp. xliii and 598. Oxford: Clarendon Press, 1979.

Co-editor, The Letters and Prose Writings of William Cowper (Volume 2: Letters, 1782-6). Pp. xxviii and 652. Oxford: Clarendon Press, 1981.

Co-editor, The Letters and Prose Writings of William Cowper (Volume 3: Letters, 1787–91). Pp. xxxiv and 630. Oxford: Clarendon Press, 1982.

Co-editor, The Letters and Prose Writings of William Cowper (Volume 4: Letters, 1792-9). Pp. xxxiv and 498. Oxford: Clarendon Press, 1984.

Co-editor, The Letters and Prose Writings of William Cowper (Volume 5: Prose and Cumulative Index). Pp. xxvi and 246. Oxford: Clarendon Press, 1986.

co-editor, William Cowper: Selected Letters. Pp. xxxi and 236. Oxford: Clarendon Press, 1989.

Co-editor. Early Voices. Edmonton: Juvenilia Press, 2001.
