= William Dendy =

Canadian architectural historian and professor

William Bruce Dendy
- Born: 1948; Edmonton, Alberta
- Died: May 29, 1993 (aged 44–45); Toronto, Ontario
- Occupation: Architectural historian

Academic background
- Education: University of Toronto; University of Cambridge; Columbia University

William Bruce Dendy was a Toronto-based Canadian architectural historian and educator best known for authoring the books Lost Toronto (1978) and Toronto Observed: Its Architecture, Patrons, and History (1986).

Dendy was born and raised in Edmonton, Alberta. He earned degrees from the University of Toronto, Cambridge University and Columbia University and taught at schools including the University of Toronto and the University of Waterloo.

Dendy's published two books with Oxford University Press and edited by William Toye. Published in 1978, Lost Toronto documented the history of 19th- and 20th- century Toronto buildings destroyed through demolition or neglect with photos of many of the buildings in their prime. Lost Toronto was recognized for literary excellence by the Toronto Book Awards (1979). He later co-authored Toronto Observed: Its Architecture, Patrons, and History (1986) with William Kilbourn, which was also awarded the City of Toronto Book Prize (1987).

In 1993, Dendy was awarded an honorary membership in the Ontario Association of Architects (OAA) which he said was "one of the most thrilling things" to have happened to him. The same year he was awarded an Allied Arts Award by the OAA for his lectures and publications about architectural history.

Dendy died May 29, 1993 at Casey House of complications from HIV/AIDS. At the time of his death he had been researching the Forest Hill and Lawrence Park neighbourhoods of Toronto. His personal papers and library, which included roughly 3,500 books, 2,500 periodicals and 38,000 slides, were donated to Special Collections & Archives at the University of Waterloo.

== Publications ==
- Dendy, William (1978). Lost Toronto. Toronto: Oxford University Press. p. 206. ISBN 0-19-540294-4.
- Dendy, William; Kilbourn, William (1986). Toronto observed : its architecture, patrons, and history. Toronto : Oxford University Press. ISBN 978-0-19-540508-8.
