= And Sometimes Y =

Canadian radio series

And Sometimes Y was a Canadian radio series broadcast on CBC Radio One. Hosted by Jane Farrow and produced by Nicola Luksic, the program explored the cultural and social context of language. Associate producer Tom Howell made regular appearances as the "Word Nerd".

The series originally aired in 2006 as a summer series hosted by Russell Smith. A new season of episodes began airing in January 2007 and continued until June. In September, Smith was replaced by Farrow.

In 2023, CBC rebroadcast the series in podcast format.
