= PTP Pink Awards =

The PTP Pink Awards are a Canadian award, created by Pink Triangle Press in 2024 to honour significant contributions to the LGBTQ community in Canada. The program presents five Champions awards to individuals, five Changemakers awards to groups, and a Legacy award

The first awards, presented on November 7, 2024, presented Champions awards to actor Elliot Page, musicians Rufus Wainwright and Jeremy Dutcher, hockey player Marie-Philip Poulin and activist Latoya Nugent; Changemakers awards to 2-Spirited People of the 1st Nations, The 519's Among Friends program for LGBTQ refugees, PFLAG Canada, Skipping Stone and You Can Play; and a Legacy award to activist and philanthropist Salah Bachir. The ceremony was hosted by Priyanka, and featured musical performances by Wainwright, Dutcher and Katie Tupper.

The 2025 awards were hosted by Emily Hampshire and Hollywood Jade, honoured organizations including the Paprika Festival, the Native Youth Sexual Health Network, the Canadian Foundation for AIDS Research, the Wabanaki Two-Spirit Alliance and Friends of Ruby, with presenters including Zaiba Baig, Devery Jacobs, Carole Pope, Douglas Elliott and Harper Steele, each representing one of the groups. A Legacy Award was also presented to Beverly Glenn-Copeland.

The 2026 ceremony was streamed on Crave's YouTube channel, one week after the ceremony. The honorees in 2026 included Hampshire, Bowen Yang, Gigi Gorgeous, Peaches and Harrison Browne, with a Legacy Award presented to Tim McCaskell.
