= Toronto Public Space Committee =

The Toronto Public Space Committee (TPSC) is a volunteer-run, non-profit organization located in Toronto, Ontario, Canada that defends the city's public space from corporate and private forces, including cars and outdoor advertising. The TPSC argues that public property, such as sidewalks, bike paths, parks, and squares, should be the independent and cultural “counterbalance” to the profit-driven private sector.

As a grassroots organization, the TPSC is financed almost entirely on donations, as well as various contributions in kind from its members, such as seeds and gardening tools. The TPSC uses a model of consensus decision-making at its monthly open meetings. The structure of the organization is currently undergoing a re-evaluation by its members.

In 2005, TPSC was called Toronto's Best Activist Group by the local Now magazine.

== Campaigns ==
The TPSC is consistently involved in local Toronto City Council affairs affecting city space. In recent years, the committee has formed various campaigns that aim to educate and lobby citizens, bureaucrats and politicians on matters such as anti-postering bylaws, tree protection, mobile (or truck) advertising, TTC subway video ads, and billboard advertising.

Other campaigns the TPSC spearheads are less political, but stay true to public-space advocacy. The committee hosts guerrilla gardening outings in the spring and summer; growing native plants and flowers in small crevices and decrepit planters in downtown streets. In 2005, the TPSC's Downtown De-Fence Project won a Clean and Beautiful City Appreciation Award.

== Spacing ==
Spacing, a 3-times-yearly magazine focusing on issues affecting Toronto's public realm, was originally published by the TPSC in house until it was spun off as a wholly independent magazine after the first issue. The two organizations support each other on occasion.

== See also ==
- Public space
- Billboards
- Culture jamming
- Critical Mass
- Guerrilla gardening
- Spacing (magazine)
