= Michael McClelland =

Canadian architect

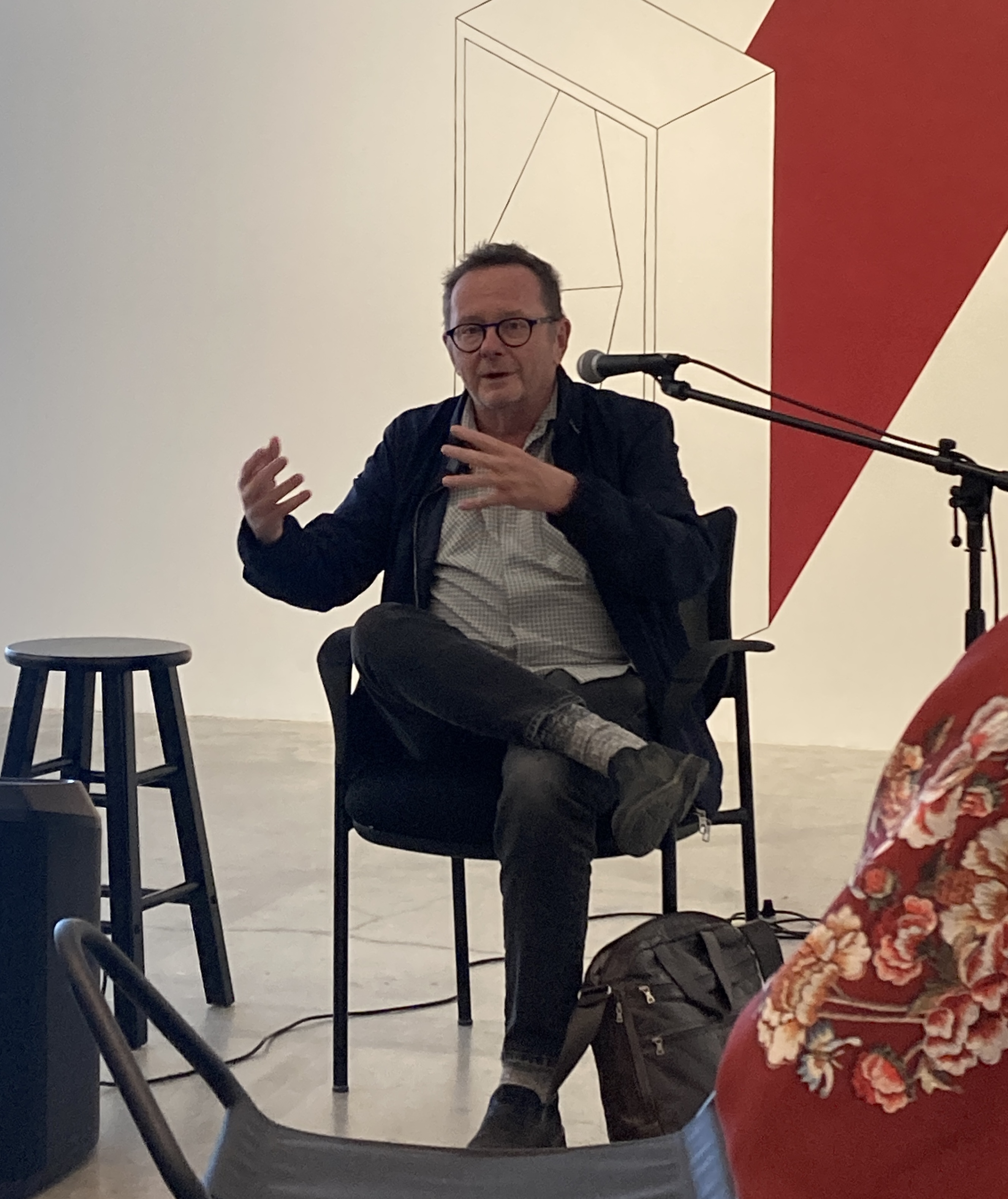
McClelland at The Power Plant Contemporary Art Gallery in Toronto in May 2024.

Michael McClelland is a Canadian architect and author. Together with architect Edwin Rowse, in 1990 McClelland founded the Toronto heritage architecture and cultural planning firm ERA Architects.

McClelland has worked on sites including Evergreen Brick Works, Mirvish Village and Honest Ed's, the Royal Ontario Museum, Union Station, the Art Gallery of Ontario, Maple Leaf Gardens, Sharon Temple, and the Senate of Canada Building. McClelland was prime architect for the redevelopment of the Distillery District, a pedestrian cultural district contained by the largest group of Victorian industrial buildings in North America.

McClelland has advocated for the recognition and conservation of modernist heritage architecture in Canada. In 2005 McClelland advocated for the protection of architect Ludwig Mies van der Rohe’s TD Centre under the Ontario Heritage Act and restored the centre's two original towers in 2013. McClelland has also restored and advocated for the recognition of mid-century “everyday modern” buildings such as architect Uno Prii’s Spadina Road Apartments in Toronto, the process of which was featured in the United States Secretary of the Interior's Standards for the Treatment of Historic Properties.

McClelland’s books include Concrete Toronto: A Guidebook to Concrete Architecture from the Fifties to the Seventies.

== Early life and education ==
McClelland graduated from the University of Toronto in 1981 with a Bachelor of Architecture (BArch).

== Career ==
=== Architecture and conservation ===
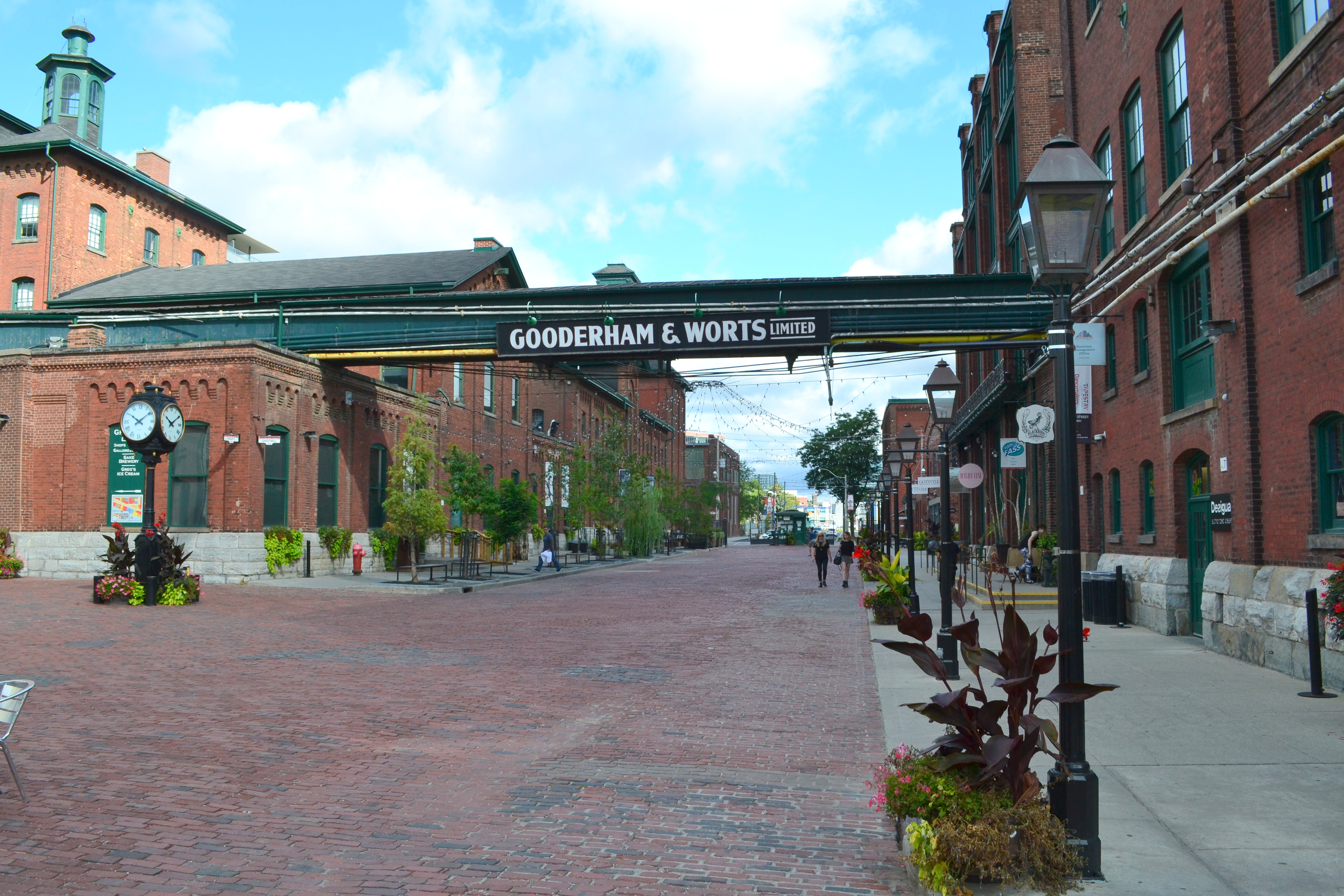
Toronto's Victorian Distillery District is visited by more than two million visitors annually.

In the 1970s McClelland held positions at the City of Vancouver's heritage department and in the 1980s at the City of Toronto’s heritage department and the Toronto Historical Board. He was a founding member of the Canadian Association of Heritage Professionals (CAHP) in 1984 and has chaired the Toronto Society of Architects and the Friends of Allan Gardens, served on the boards of the Association for Preservation Technology International and the International Council on Monuments and Sites Canada, and been a council member of the Ontario Association of Architects.

In 2008, together with architect Graeme Stewart McClelland founded the Tower Renewal Partnership, an initiative that promotes and facilitates the sustainable retrofitting of postwar slab apartment towers across Canada. The City of Toronto established a Tower Renewal department the same year. In 2023, over 2,000 towers across Toronto and Canada had been impacted as a result of this private-public initiative.

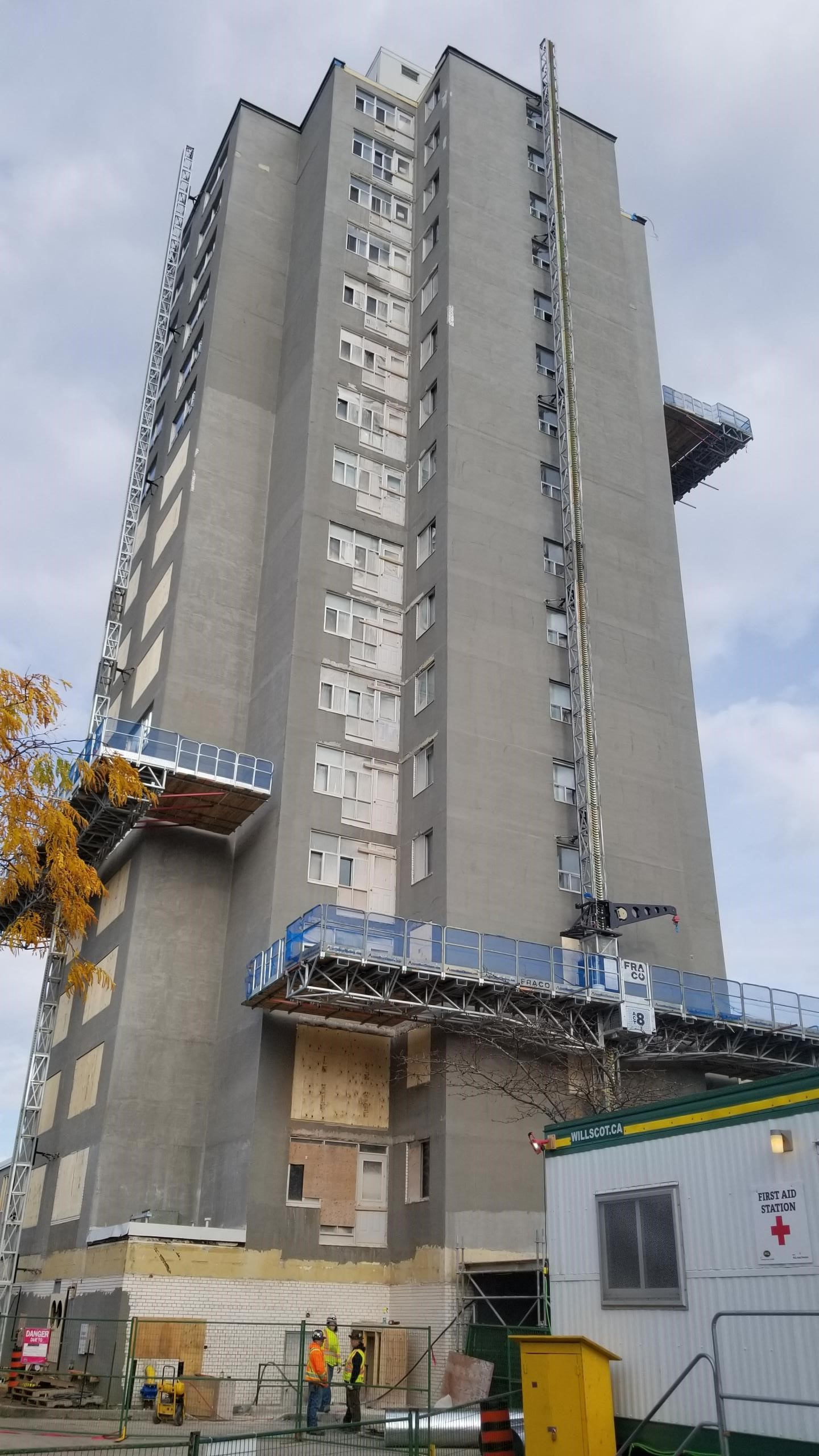
The Ken Soble Tower in Hamilton, Ontario, was retrofitted by ERA Architects in 2021 as part of their Tower Renewal Partnership and is the world’s largest residential building that meets the Passive House standard.

=== ERA Architects Inc. ===
McClelland founded ERA Architects with Edwin Rowse in 1990. As one of the largest heritage architecture firms in Canada with offices in Toronto, Montreal, Ottawa, and Calgary, ERA has worked on sites such as Centre Block, the Royal Victoria Hospital, The Grange, St. James’ Cathedral, MOCA Toronto, the Flatiron Building, Colborne Lodge, Toronto’s Canada Malting Silos, Bell Media Studios, the Canadian Gay and Lesbian Archives, Stanley Barracks, Sainte-Marie among the Hurons, St. Lawrence Hall, the Daniels Faculty of Architecture, Landscape and Design building, University College, Victoria University, the Munk School of Global Affairs, the R. C. Harris Water Treatment Plant, Trinity Bellwoods Gates, Macdonald Block, the Don Jail, and The Carlu.

== Publications ==
McClelland has edited and co-authored books on architecture, culture, and urbanism, including East/West: A Guide to Where People Live in Downtown Toronto, The Ward Uncovered: The Archaeology of Everyday Life, The Ward: the Life and Loss of Toronto’s First Immigrant Neighbourhood, and Concrete Toronto: A Guidebook to Concrete Architecture from the Fifties to the Seventies. Concrete Toronto won a Heritage Toronto Award of Excellence, a Design Exchange Award, and the Canadian Association of Heritage Professionals Award of Merit.

In 2019 McClelland co-produced the musical The Ward Cabaret with journalist John Lorinc, which was performed at Soulpepper, Luminato, and the Harbourfront Centre.

== Awards and recognition ==
McClelland is a multiple-time recipient of the Ontario Heritage Trust Lieutenant Governor’s Ontario Heritage Award for Excellence in Conservation and has been awarded the Royal Architectural Institute of Canada Governor General’s Medal in Architecture, the Ontario Association of Architects Award of Excellence, the Canadian Architect Award of Merit, and the City of Toronto Urban Design Award of Excellence. He is a fellow of the Royal Architectural Institute of Canada.
