= Carrianne Leung =

Canadian writer

- Born: Carrianne Leung; Hong Kong
- Occupation: Writer
- Writing career
- Period: 2010s-present
- Notable works: The Wondrous Woo, That Time I Loved You
- Website: carrianneleung.com [Does not seem to be working as of August 2026]

Carrianne Leung is a Canadian writer. She won the Danuta Gleed Literary Award in 2019 for her short story collection That Time I Loved You.

Originally from Hong Kong, Leung moved to Canada in childhood and grew up in the Scarborough district of Toronto, Ontario. She completed a PhD in sociology and equity studies at the Ontario Institute for Studies in Education, and has taught at OCAD University. She teaches at the University of Guelph.

She is a two-time Toronto Book Award nominee, receiving nods in 2014 for her novel The Wondrous Woo and in 2018 for That Time I Loved You.
