= William Kilbourn =

Canadian author & historian (1926–1995)

William Morley Kilbourn
- Born: 18 December 1926; Toronto, Ontario
- Died: 4 January 1995 (aged 68); Toronto, Ontario
- Education: University of Toronto (BA '49); Harvard University (AM '49, PhD '57); University of Oxford (BA '52, MA '56)
- Spouse: Mary Elizabeth Sawyer (m. 1949)

William Morley Kilbourn OC FRSC (18 December 1926 – 4 January 1995) was a Canadian author, historian, professor, and politician. Kilbourn wrote on various topics in Canadian history, including economics, religion, and biography. After studying at Oxford and Harvard during the 1950s, in 1962 Kilbourn joined the faculty at York University. From 1962 to 1967 he served as the chairman of its humanities division. In 1969, Kilbourn was elected to Toronto City Council and remained an alderman until 1976. Along with his academic activities, Kilbourn was an active member of the Liberal Party of Canada.

== Biography ==
William Morley Kilbourn was born in Toronto on 18 December 1926 to Kenneth Morley Kilbourn (1898–1985) and Mary Rae Fawcett (1900–1997). From 1937 to 1944 he attended Upper Canada College. Kilbourn entered Trinity College, University of Toronto and graduated bachelor of arts in 1948. He then went to Harvard University, where in 1949 he graduated Master of Arts. In the fall of 1949, Kilbourn moved to England to study at Oxford, and in 1952 he earned a second bachelor's degree. From 1951 to 1953, he served as a lecturer in the history department at McMaster University in Hamilton, Ontario. Kilbourn returned to Harvard in 1953 as a doctoral student, and from 1953 to 1955 was also a teaching fellow. In 1955 he was appointed a professor of history at McMaster. Kilbourn earned a second master's at Oxford in 1956, and completed his PhD at Harvard in 1957.

In 1962, Kilbourn joined the history faculty at York University. Kilbourn served for five years as the first chairman of humanities.

In the 1969 Toronto municipal election, Kilbourn was elected to Toronto City Council for Ward 10. He was reelected in the 1972 Toronto municipal election and 1974 Toronto municipal election, and chose not to run in 1976. From 1973 to 1976 he served on the City Executive Committee and the Metropolitan Council.

He was also founding chairman of the Toronto Art Therapy Institute and the Toronto Distress Centre, a member of the Toronto Historical Board, the boards of the Toronto General Hospital and Young People's Theatre, and served as chairman of the Toronto Arts Council. Kilbourn was also a member of the executives of the Canada Council and the Canadian commission for UNESCO. Kilbourn was elected to the Royal Society of Canada in 1980.

On 10 September 1949 in Thorold, Ontario, Kilbourn married Mary Elizabeth "Betsy" Sawyer (1926–2023), the daughter of the Rev'd Philip Sawyer (1890–1980) and Violet Hill (1895–1975). The ceremony took place at the Church of St John the Evangelist and was conducted by the Philip Sawyer. The Kilbourns had five children: Philippa, Hilary, Nicholas, Timothy, and Michael. Kilbourn died in Toronto on 4 January 1995 at age 68.

== Works ==
=== Monographs ===
- The Firebrand: William Lyon Mackenzie and the Rebellion in Upper Canada (1956)
- The Elements Combined: A History of the Steel Company of Canada (1960)
- The Making of the Nation: A Century of Challenge (1966)
- Religion in Canada: The Spiritual Development of a Nation (1968)
- Pipeline: TransCanada and the Great Debate (1970)
- C. D. Howe: A Biography (1979, with Robert Bothwell)

=== Edited volumes ===
- The Restless Church: A Response to The Comfortable Pew (1966)
- Canada: A Guide to the Peaceable Kingdom (1970)

=== Toronto ===
- The Toronto Book: An Anthology of Writings Past and Present (1976)
- Toronto in Pictures and Words (1977, with Rudi Christl)
- Toronto Remembered: A Celebration of the City (1984)
- Toronto Observed: Its Architecture, Patrons, and History (1986, with William Dendy)
- Intimate Grandeur: One Hundred Years at Massey Hall (1993)
