= Jack Batten =

Canadian writer of fiction and non-fiction (born 1932)

Jack Batten (born January 23, 1932) is a Canadian writer and broadcaster, author of more than 40 fiction and non-fiction books and winner of book and magazine awards.

== Early life ==
Jack Hubert Batten was born in Montreal to Jack and Kathleen Batten and moved with his parents to Toronto when he was three years old. He attended the University of Toronto Schools (UTS) and completed a BA in philosophy and history at Victoria College, University of Toronto in 1954. He then earned a law degree at the University of Toronto Law School in 1957, was called to the bar in 1959, and practised law for four years at MacLaughlin, Macaulay, May and Soward.

== Career ==
=== Writing ===
He left the legal profession in 1962 to make his living as a writer, starting as a staff writer and copy editor at Maclean's magazine. After a short period at Canadian Magazine he returned to Maclean's as staff writer, then became managing editor at Saturday Night, and later a staff writer for Star Weekly. He has been a freelance writer since 1968.

His articles have appeared in Toronto Life, Reader's Digest, Rolling Stone, Chatelaine and other magazines. He reviewed jazz for The Globe and Mail in the 1970s, and crime novels for the Toronto Star from 1998 to 2017 (his reviews were syndicated to other papers in the Torstar chain at the time). His books include biographies of Tom Longboat, lawyer John Josiah Robinette, and Ed Mirvish, a series of crime novels featuring a criminal lawyer called Crang, sports books on hockey and basketball, books for young adult readers, and books on the legal and justice systems in Canada.

=== Broadcasting ===
Between 1977 and 2002, Batten reviewed movies twice a week for CBC's Metro Morning radio program.

== Personal life ==
Jack Batten is married to the gardening writer and consultant Marjorie Harris. He was previously married to Jane Bradshaw, and has two children, Brad and Sarah. He lives in Toronto.

== Awards ==
- 1993: Arbor Award, University of Toronto
- 1997: Silver National Magazine Award
- 1999: Gold National Magazine Award, Arts and Entertainment Category
- 2002: Norma Fleck Award for Best Children's Non-fiction Book for The Man Who Ran Faster than Everyone
- 2003: Distinguished Alumnus Award from Victoria College, University of Toronto
- 2023: Derrick Murdoch Award, Crime Writers of Canada

== Archives ==
Jack Batten's papers and manuscripts are held at the Thomas Fisher Rare Book Library of the University of Toronto.

== Select bibliography ==
=== Non-fiction ===
- The Inside Story of Conn Smythe's Hockey Dynasty (1969)
- Honest Ed's Story: The Crazy Rags to Riches Story of Ed Mirvish (1972)
- The Leafs in Autumn (1975)
- Lawyers (1980)
- In Court (1982)
- Robinette: The Dean of Canadian Lawyers (1984)
- On Trial (1986)
- Judges (1987)
- Mind over Murder, DNA and other Forensic Adventures (1995)
- Hoopla: Inside the Toronto Raptors' First Season (1996)
- The Man Who Ran Faster than Everyone: A Biography of Tom Longboat (2002)
- The Annex: The Story of a Toronto Neighbourhood (2004)
- Silent in an Evil Time: The Brave War of Edith Cavell (2007)
- Oscar Peterson (2012)
- Ross Mackay, The Saga of a Brilliant Criminal Lawyer (2020)

=== Fiction ===
- Tie-Breaker (young adult novel, 1984)
- Crang Plays the Ace (1987)
- Straight No Chaser (1988)
- Riviera Blues (1990)
- Blood Count (1991)
- Take Five (2013)
- Keeper of the Flame (2016)
