= Russell Smith (writer) =

Canadian writer and newspaper columnist

- Born: August 2, 1963 (age 63); Johannesburg, South Africa
- Occupations: Novelist, short story writer, columnist
- Writing career
- Language: English
- Notable works: How Insensitive, Noise, Muriella Pent

Russell Claude Smith (born August 2, 1963 in Johannesburg, South Africa) is a Canadian writer and newspaper columnist. Smith's novels and short stories are mostly set in Toronto, where he lives.

== Biography ==
Smith grew up in Halifax, Nova Scotia. He attended the Halifax Grammar School and Queen Elizabeth High School, and studied French literature at Queen's University, the University of Poitiers, and Paris III. He has an MA in French from Queen's University.

As a freelance reporter and cultural commentator, he has published in The New York Review of Books, Details, The Walrus, Toronto Life, Flare, Now, EnRoute, and other journals. He won the William Allen White award for magazine writing in 1995.

From 1999 to 2020, Smith wrote a weekly column on the arts for The Globe and Mail. On resigning from the column, Smith published an article in The Walrus reflecting on his departure as a mixture of quick-digest writing, lack of editorial support, and a cut-throat business model. The discontinuation of the column was lamented by The Walrus letters to the editor.

Smith throughout his career expressed a profound interest in Canadian English. He was the host of the CBC radio program on language, And Sometimes Y, for two seasons.

Smith taught the Fiction Workshop in the University of Guelph's Master of Fine Arts in Creative Writing programme from 2009 to 2017.

In 2019 he became an acquiring editor for Dundurn Press.

Smith was born with complete complex syndactyly, a deformity of the hands and feet.

== Fiction ==
His early novels, How Insensitive (1994) and Noise (1998), are satirical and comic portrayals of big-city life and the sexual mores of young people. How Insensitive was nominated for a Governor General's Award. Noise was published in German as Glamour by List Verlag.

His book of short stories, Young Men, followed in 1999. The opening story in that collection, "Party Going", won the Canadian National Magazine Award for fiction in 1997.

He then published an illustrated fantasy novella, The Princess and the Whiskheads, an allegory about the role of art in a metropolis. The illustrations are by Wesley Bates.

His pornographic novel, Diana: A Diary in the Second Person (2003), was published by Gutter Press under the pseudonym Diane Savage. The novel was republished, under his own name, with a new introduction, by Biblioasis in 2008.

Muriella Pent (2004) is a longer novel, concerning the arrival of a Caribbean writer of mixed race into the environment of Canadian culture. It was shortlisted for the Rogers Writers' Trust Fiction Prize, and named as Best Fiction of 2004 by Amazon.ca.

His novel Girl Crazy was published by HarperCollins Canada in 2010.

His short story collection, Confidence, was published in 2015, and was longlisted for the 2015 Scotiabank Giller Prize. One of the stories in that collection, "Raccoons", won the Canadian National Magazine Award for fiction in that year.

In 2025 Smith published the novel Self Care (Biblioasis), the story of a young feminist woman who develops a secret sexual relationship with an incel boy. The novel was listed by The Globe and Mail as a Best Book of 2025.

== Other works ==
In 2005 Thomas Dunne Books published Smith's non-fiction book, Men's Style: The Thinking Man's Guide To Dress, which is based on his regular column on men's fashion in the Canadian national newspaper The Globe and Mail. The book was illustrated by Edwin Fotheringham.

Smith's memoir Blindsided: How Twenty Years of Writing About Booze, Drugs and Sex Ended in the Blink of an Eye was released as an e-book.

In 2018, Smith compiled and edited the anthology Best Canadian Stories 2018 (Biblioasis).

In 2020, Smith translated Quebec novelist Nadine Bismuth's novel Un Lien Familial, as A Family Affair (Anansi).

== Bibliography ==
- How Insensitive (1994)
- Noise (1998)
  - German translation by Marlies Ruß: Glamour (2000)
- Young Men (1999)
- The Princess and the Whiskheads (2002)
- Diana: A Diary in the Second Person (2003)
- Muriella Pent (2004)
- Men's Style: The Thinking Man's Guide to Dress (2005)
- Girl Crazy (2010)
- Confidence (2015)
- Best Canadian Stories 2018 (editor) (2018)
- A Family Affair by Nadine Bismuth (translator) (2020)
- Self Care (2025)
