= Pussy Palace Raid =

Police raid in Toronto, Canada

The Pussy Palace Raid occurred on September 14, 2000, when Toronto police raided a lesbian bathhouse known as the "Pussy Palace" during the "2000 Pussies" event. Two undercover female police officers attended and investigated the event prior to the raid. Five plainclothes male police officers then entered and searched the club, including private rooms. There were around 350 women in attendance at the time, many of whom were nude or semi-clad.

No charges were laid that night but weeks later two volunteers were charged with Liquor License Act violations. The charges were dismissed by the Ontario Court Justice in 2002, stating the search was carried out in an unreasonable manner. The women attendees had the right to expect female officers would search the premises under Canada's Charter of Rights which protects people from searches by those of the opposite sex.

The Women's Bathhouse Committee filed a complaint to the Ontario Human Rights Commission in 2001 which was settled with Toronto Police Services Board in 2004. As part of the settlement the Toronto Police Service were required to enhance their efforts to recruit gay officers and adopt a "gender-sensitive" policy.

== Timeline ==
=== 1998 ===
- September 14 - The first-ever Toronto Women's Bathhouse event, dubbed Pussy Palace.

=== 2000 ===
- September 11 - First anonymous tip from a woman who said she was a lesbian, complained about what went on in a previous Pussy Palace event.
- September 14 - Second anonymous call also from a woman who said she was a lesbian, made a similar complaint and demanded to know whether police would attend the event.
  - 6:00 p.m. – Start time of the fourth ever event and second anniversary, Pussy Palace night "2000 Pussies".
  - 12:15 a.m. - Two undercover female officers bought tickets, entered and observed, took notes.
  - 12:45 a.m. - five male plainclothes officers from 52 Division entered the Pussy Palace.
  - 12:45 - 1:45 a.m. - JP Hornick is questioned by lead detective Dave Wilson at the bar.
  - 12:45 - 2:15 a.m. - officers split up and searched the space.
- September 21 - Community forum to plan a response at 7 p.m. at the 519 Church Street Community Centre. "What had been a public forum became a spontaneous protest march on police headquarters. We had not anticipated this but quickly decided to endorse and lead the march. Within minutes, march marshals Pussies Bite Back /159 volunteered and were organized, bullhorns located, the media was called and hundreds of us spilled into the streets halting traffic and chanting 'What do we want? Pussy! When do we want it? NOW!' "
- September 28 - Organizers of the Women's Bath House attend a 1:30 p.m. Police Services Board Meeting, at Police Headquarters Auditorium, 40 College Street, Toronto. Later at 7 p.m. rally in Masaryk Park there is a Pussy Palace contingent in Take Back the Night March.
- October 6 – The Toronto Women's Bath House Organizing Committee is notified by the police that two members of the committee will be charged with Liquor License Act violations.
- October 13 - Volunteer appreciation night for at Pope Joan (on Parliament Street) to thank the women who have helped out with the Pussy Palaces.
- October 20 - Summonses are issued for 6 liquor licence charges against two volunteers who signed the Special Occasion Permit.
- October 28 - Panty Picket Protest 2 - 3 p.m. At 52 Division (University and McCaul). Rally at 1:30 p.m. South-west corner of Dundas Street West and McCaul. Organized by the Toronto Women's Bathhouse Committee the website read: "Help us send a clear message to the POLICE DEPARTMENT that the community is FURIOUS that charges have been laid. BRING YOUR OUTRAGE AND FURY! BRING your PANTIES, LINGERIE, BOXERS and BRIEFS!"
- October 29 - Toronto Women's Bath House Committee holds a fundraiser for Women's Bath House Defense Fund at Pope Joan (tickets were sliding scale).
- November - Another $150 per ticket event at Rodney's Oyster House thrown by the Friends of the Women's Bath House Defense Fund, attended by politicians Olivia Chow, Bill Graham, Kyle Rae and George Smitherman.

=== 2001 ===
- March - The Women's Bathhouse Committee files an Ontario Human Rights Commission complaint against the police and had asked the Toronto Police Services Board for an investigation.
- October and December - The case is heard in Court.

=== 2002 ===
- January 31 - All charges are dropped by the Ontario Court of Justice. (Case: 2002 CarswellOnt 992)
- July 30 - Class-action suit launched against the Toronto Police Services Board and the five male officers involved in the raid.
- March 26 - A $125 ticket fundraising dinner for legal expenses at Byzantium (499 Church Street).
- May – June - Three week Libel case of Toronto City Councillor Kyle Rae, a jury of six decided he must pay $170,000 (from the City of Toronto insurance fund) in damages to the seven police officers involved for calling them "cowboys," "goons," "renegades" and "rogue cops" to media.
- June - The two exonerated volunteers are Grand Marshals for Pride Toronto 2002.

=== 2004 ===
- June 17 - The Ontario Human Rights Commission calls a public hearing into the raid. Would be the first time police have faced a hearing over alleged misconduct in carrying out their duties. Pussy Palace 2004: Reclaiming Raunch at Club Toronto was also on this day.
- December 17 - Settlement of litigation, human-rights complaint and lawsuit against the Toronto Police Services Board dropped.

=== 2005 ===
- 2004 – 2005 - Human Rights Tribunal of Ontario; Settlements - Toronto Women's Bathhouse Committee, Gillis, Jansen, Rowe, Gallant, Hamilton, Chan, Thames v. Toronto Police Services Board, Wilson, Greenaway, Petrie, Demkiw, Christie; Grounds - sex, sexual harassment, sexual orientation.
- March 31 - Settlement with the Toronto Police Service is approved by Ontario Superior Court.
- June 16 - Pussy Prevail: We Came, We Fought, We Con-queered bathhouse at Club Toronto.

=== 2016 ===
- June 22 - Toronto police Chief Mark Saunders apologizes for bathhouse raids. The public apology is rejected by Women's Bath House Committee member, Chanelle Gallant: "we don't see the apology as being meaningful because it doesn't reflect a change in the actual practices of the police."

== The charges ==
The Applicants are each charged with six counts under the Liquor Licence Act R.S.O. 1990, Chapter L19:

- Three counts of Permit Disorderly Conduct;
- One count of Fail to Provide Sufficient Security;
- One count of Permit Liquor to be Removed from Premises;
- One count of serve Liquor Outside of Prescribed Hours.

== Outcomes ==
The settlement between the Toronto Women's Bathhouse Committee and the Toronto Police Services Board rules the Toronto Police Service must:

1. Enhance their efforts to recruit gay officers, and to report annually on their success in doing so.
2. Adopt a "gender-sensitive" policy which officers must abide by if they attend locations occupied solely by women who may be partly or fully undressed.
3. Carry out confidential surveys of members who leave the force to find out whether racism, homophobia or other forms of discrimination prompted their decision to resign.
4. Pay $350,000 to the complainants. The money will go toward covering legal fees and specific charities:
  - $25,000 to Maggie's, an organization that runs support programs for Toronto sex workers.
  - $165,000 to The Bill 7 Award fund.

== Key people ==
Janet Rowe was on AIDS Committee of Toronto wanted to start a bathhouse night for women to talk about safe sex in a welcoming, safe environment. Together with Loralee Gillis they founded the Toronto Women's Bathhouse Committee. Other members of the women's bathhouse committee include Chanelle Gallant, Diane Hamilton, Carlyle Jansen, Karen Chan, and Chi Chi LaFemme. Two others JP Hornick in charge of the Security the night of the raid and a special events organizer were the two volunteers charged following the September event.

Frank Addario acted as the lawyer for the Toronto Women's Bathhouse Committee resulting in Ontario Court Judge Peter Hryn dismissing the case and the Crown Prosecutor withdrawing the charges. Funds to support the case were raised through donations and fundraisers by the Women's Bath House Defense Fund.

In the year 2000, Julian Fantino was Toronto Police Chief, Bill Blair was the head of corporate communications and Aidan Maher was Superintendent commander of 52 Division. It was 52 division that carried out the raid, led by detective Dave Wilson. The two undercover female officers who first entered the event are detective constable Chris LaFrance and special investigations services (SIS) constable Janet Hall. LaFrance who was a lesbian herself felt branded a traitor in the community later left the Toronto Police and the city. The remaining police officers are SIS detective constable Peter Christie, SIS detective Myron Demkiw (as of 19 December 2022, Toronto Police Chief), constable Rich Petrie, and detective constable Adrian Greenaway.

Michael Freeman was the lawyer for the six investigating police officers who filed and won a defamation lawsuit against City of Toronto Councillor Kyle Rae for comments he made to the press about them after the Pussy Palace event raid.
