= Spacing (magazine) =

Toronto-based magazine

- Editor: Matthew Blackett
- Frequency: Quarterly
- Founded: 2003
- Country: Canada
- Based in: Toronto, Ontario
- Language: English
- Website: spacing.ca
- ISSN: 1708-5799

Spacing is a magazine published in Toronto, Ontario, Canada. Focusing on issues affecting the public realm in Toronto and nationally (four issues each per year), Spacing was originally published by the Toronto Public Space Committee in house until it was spun off as a wholly independent magazine after the first issue.

== History and profile ==
Launched in December 2003, the magazine has been critically acclaimed by Toronto Star, The Globe and Mail, the National Post and Utne Reader magazine, the latter of which nominated Spacing the best new title at its annual independent magazine awards in 2004, and nominated the magazine again in 2006 for Best Local Coverage and Best Design. The magazine is published three times a year. In 2006, Spacing won a Canadian National Magazine Award for "Best Editorial Package" for the 'History of our Future' issue. Noteworthy Toronto photographers Matt O'Sullivan, Rannie Turingan, Miles Storey and Sam Javanrouh, are known for the street-scene photos featured in Spacing issues. Past Spacing issues have focused on pedestrians in public space, street postering, public art, and public transit, the future plans for the city that were never developed, the top 10 public space issues for the 2006 municipal elections, and profiles of Toronto's intersections.

The cover of each issue of Spacing features a prominent headline related to that issue's theme:

1. The Fight to Save Postering
2. Everyone is a Pedestrian
3. Work and Play
4. The History of Our Future
5. The New Beautiful City
6. Searching for the Better Way
7. What Kind of City do you Want?
8. At the Crossroads
9. Water
10. Is Toronto Ready to be a Green City?
11. The Car and the City
12. The People Issue
13. Urban Design Ideas Competition
14. Grey Spaces
15. Return of Suburbia
16. Animals
17. Rules
18. Oh, the Spectacle
19. City Hall
20. Winter
21. Canadian Public Spaces
22. The Hungry City
23. The National Issue
24. Disaster

Spacing is also widely known for creating and selling the Toronto subway button series, which replicates the tile patterns and colours of every Toronto subway station. They have also been instrumental in putting on social events around the city, often collaborating with local political and heritage organizations. For the 2006 municipal election, Spacing hosted 'The Political Party' in which the leader contenders, Jane Pitfield and incumbent David Miller read pre-prepared speeches to a raucous crowd of over 500. Spacing has twice co-hosted 'Toronto the Good' parties at Fort York at the foot of Bathurst Street, and the Distillery District off Parliament Street by the Don River in Toronto. Advocacy for public transit is a key element of the magazine's editorial focus, and as such they have hosted parties, conferences, and exhibitions in support of the Toronto Transit Commission (TTC).

The magazine has seven daily blogs: Spacing Canada, Spacing Toronto, Spacing Vancouver, Spacing Montreal, Spacing Ottawa, Spacing Atlantic and Spacing Edmonton. Spacing Calgary is expected to launch in the near future. All follow a similar group blog format providing commentary, links, and events for local urban issues. Spacing's website also features Spacing Photos, a photoblog that highlights images based on a theme captured by a wide range of Toronto photobloggers. The Spacing Votes blog was created for the 2006 city election, and was active from September 2006 to November 2006. It was written by the Spacing editors alongside guest columnist John Lorinc, the author of The New City: How the Crisis of Canada's Cities is Shaping Our Nation, and writer for Toronto Life on urban affairs.

Spacing also produces the biweekly podcast Spacing Radio, hosted by CBC National Radio News anchor David Michael Lamb. The podcast launched in early 2009.

== Awards ==
- Nominated in the 2006 Independent Press Awards for Best Local Coverage and Best Design.
- Won the 2006 Award of Merit in the publications category from Heritage Toronto.
- Received the 2005 National Magazine Award for Best Editorial Package for its The History of Our Future issue (Spring/Summer 2005, #4) over magazine heavyweights Saturday Night, Report on Business, and Canadian Geographic, among other nominees.
- In January 2006, the readers of Toronto's Eye Weekly chose Spacing's daily blog the Spacing Wire as the Best Local Blog of 2005.
- Nominated for a 2005 Canadian Newsstand Award for Best Newsstand Issue, small magazine for its The History of Our Future issue (Spring/Summer 2005, #4).
- In September 2005, Spacing's subway button collection placed 3rd in the Top 5 Wearable Self-Promotion Items of 2005 presented by HOW Design magazine.
- In October 2005, Coupe Design magazine also showcased the subway button collection as one of 2005's top design items.
- In January 2005, the issue Everyone is a Pedestrian (Spring/Summer 2004, #2) was awarded the Best Single Issue Design by Applied Arts magazine.
- In December 2004, nominated for Best New Title in Utne Magazine’s Independent Press Awards.
