= Tim McCaskell =

Canadian writer and activist (born 1951)

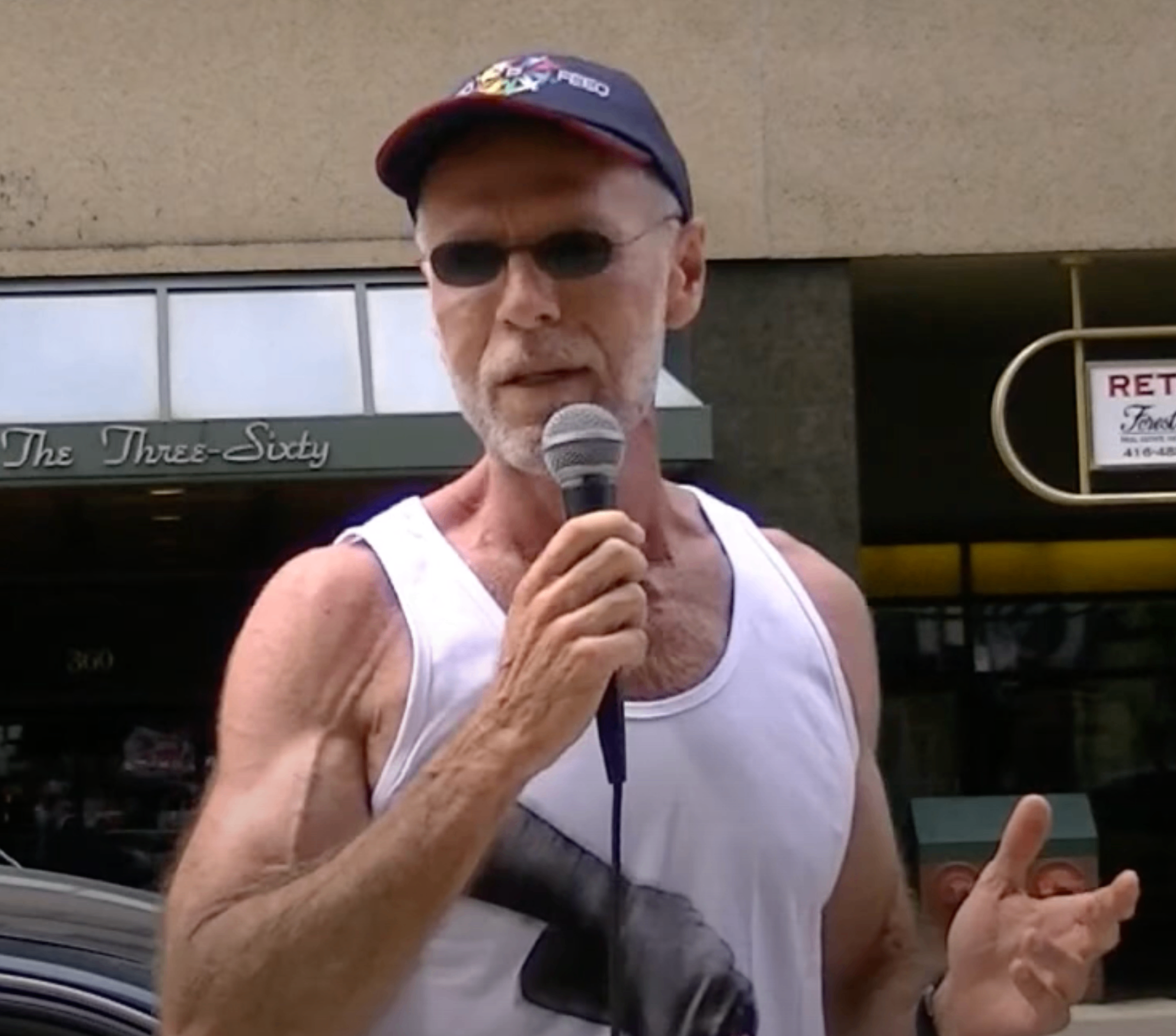
- Freedom Flotilla II protest in July 2011
- Born: 1951 (age 74–75); Beaverton, Ontario, Canada
- Education: University of Toronto (BA, 1982)
- Occupations: Educator; writer; activist
- Organization(s): Right to Privacy Committee, AIDS Action Now!, Simon Nkoli Anti-Apartheid Committee, Queers Against Israeli Apartheid
- Known for: Gay rights, AIDS, anti-apartheid activism
- Notable work: Queer Progress: From Homophobia to Homonationalism (2016)
- Partner: Richard Fung

Tim McCaskell (born 1951) is a Canadian writer, educator, and activist involved in gay rights, HIV/AIDS, and anti-apartheid advocacy.

McCaskell began his career as a writer for the gay liberation magazine The Body Politic. After the 1981 police raids on gay bathhouses in Toronto, McCaskell organized protests and legal defense funds with the Right to Privacy Committee.

Diagnosed with HIV/AIDS in the 1980s, McCaskell co-founded AIDS Action Now! which organized for the rights of people with HIV, including treatment access. In 1989, he disrupted the opening ceremony of the International AIDS Conference with other activists to demand a bill of rights for people with HIV. He stated: "On behalf of people with AIDS from Canada and around the world, I would like to officially open this Fifth International Conference on AIDS!"

In the late 1980s, McCaskell advocated for the release of gay anti-apartheid activist Simon Nkoli through the Simon Nkoli Anti-Apartheid Committee. Nearly 20 years later, he co-founded and served as the spokesperson for Queers Against Israeli Apartheid.

For 20 years, McCaskell was an employee of the Toronto District School Board, working on social equity educational programs. After retiring, he wrote Race to Equity (2005) about his work at the school board. In 2016, he published Queer Progress: From Homopobia to Homonationalism about his life and the gay rights movement in Canada from 1974 to 2014.

== Early life and education ==
Born in 1951, McCaskell grew up in Beaverton, Ontario, in a Presbyterian family. While studying at Carleton University, he became involved in anti-war activism. After a year, he dropped out of college and spent several years traveling through Europe, South America, and India.

McCaskell completed a Bachelor of Arts degree at the University of Toronto in 1982. He started working on his Master of Education degree a few years later.

== Career ==
=== Gay rights activism ===
In 1974, McCaskell moved to Toronto. He became involved with the Marxist Institute of Toronto, where he focused on gay rights issues. There he also met his long-term partner, Richard Fung.

Between 1974 and 1986, McCaskell wrote for The Body Politic, a Canadian gay liberation magazine. After two gay activists were arrested and convicted for kissing each other in public in 1976, Gay Alliance Toward Equality and The Body Politic organized a "kiss-in" protest at the same intersection. Twenty people, including McCaskell, participated in the protest.

On February 5, 1981, McCaskell witnessed Operation Soap, a raid by the Metropolitan Toronto Police against four gay bathhouses that resulted in $35,000 worth of property damage and the arrest of about 300 men. In addition to reporting on the raids for The Body Politic, McCaskell helped to organize protests against the police and fundraise money for legal defenses through the newly-formed Right to Privacy Committee (RTPC). According to McCaskell, the police had expected most people to plead guilty to avoid publicity around their sexual orientation; however, the government lost around 80% of the cases. McCaskell has said that Operation Soap and the subsequent activism helped to unify Toronto's gay community.

In 2000, McCaskell assisted in organizing protests after the police raided Pussy Palace, a lesbian bathhouse event. According to an organizer, McCaskell told her to lead the protesters in shouting: "No more shit!", the same slogan shouted by gay men in the Operation Soap protests.

=== AIDS activism ===
McCaskell became aware of AIDS through reading the US news. Although he was not formally diagnosed until testing became available in 1986, he suspected he had HIV as early as 1981. Since the late 1980s, McCaskell has been involved in HIV/AIDS activism, particularly with AIDS Action Now! (AAN), which he co-founded.

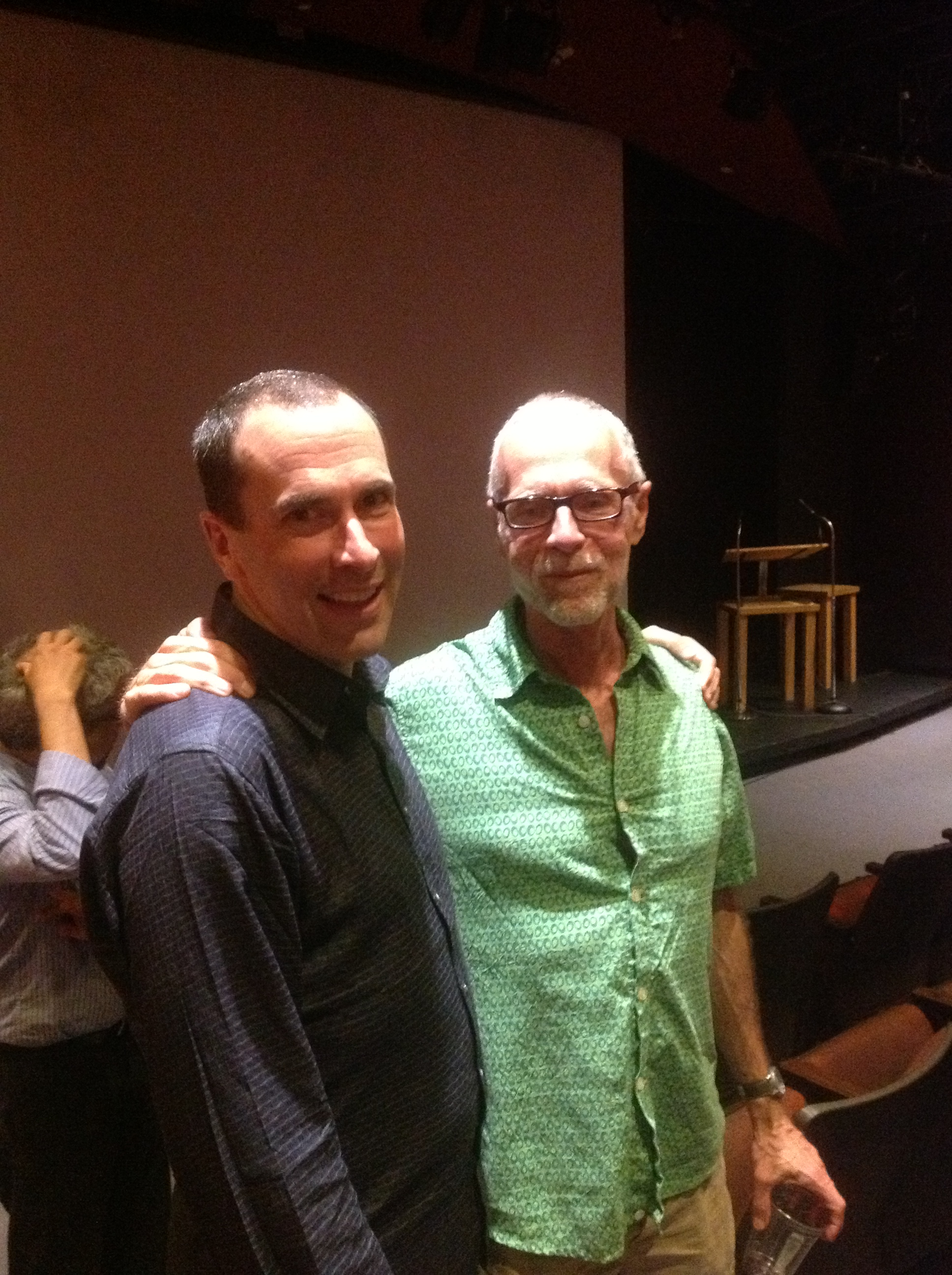
Tim McCaskell (R) with John Greyson in 2013

In their first protest, AAN brought coffins to the front of Toronto General Hospital, which was conducting a double blind clinical trial of pentamidine, a Pneumocystis carinii medication that had already been approved in the US. AAN wanted the Canadian government to approve the drug immediately rather than require sick study participants to take a placebo in a clinical trial for a drug that AAN believed had already been proved effective. McCaskell has explained that AAN brought coffins because they expected the trial to kill around 10-15 study participants: "You’re going to need these caskets because you’re going to kill our friends." In another protest, AAN burned an effigy of the health minister. AAN also started bringing pentamidine into Canada from the US. Eventually the trial was discontinued, the drug was made available in Canada, and the government instituted its first National AIDS Strategy.

In 1989, McCaskell joined other AIDS activists in disrupting the opening ceremony of the 5th International AIDSConference in Montreal. Although they had not been invited to speak, they took the stage, chanting protest slogans. As the audience cheered, McCaskell stated: "On behalf of people with AIDS from Canada and around the world, I would like to officially open this Fifth International Conference on AIDS!" The activists read the "Montreal Manifesto", which demanded a bill of rights for people with AIDS, including their right to be involved in decision-making around AIDS. Thirty-three years later, McCaskell was formally invited to address the opening ceremony of the 24th International AIDS Conference in Montreal; during his speech he advocated for conference attendees who had been denied visas by the Canadian government.

In 1989, he appeared in "The Great AZT Debate" on the Toronto Living with AIDS cable access channel. The piece features McCaskell and three other men debating the benefits of AZT, an HIV medication that had recently been developed.

Throughout 1997, AAN participated in protests of the government's decision to end its National AIDS Strategy. At one point, AAN activists left a pile of empty pill bottles at the office of a Member of Parliament. McCaskell stated: "These empty pill bottles are as useless to us as empty promises. For the people living in Canada, this is a day of shame."

McCaskell's work as an AIDS activist was featured in John Greyson's 2009 documentary opera film Fig Trees along with South African AIDS activist Zackie Achmat.

McCaskell has been outspoken against the criminalization of HIV. In 2012, he advocated against requiring people with HIV to disclose their status because he argued that it could lead people to avoid getting tested for HIV and thus cause them to unknowingly spread HIV. He later criticized the Supreme Court of Canada's ruling that a person with HIV could be charged with sexual assault if they have condomless sex without disclosing their status while their viral load is not suppressed.

=== Anti-apartheid activism ===
While serving as international news editor for The Body Politic, McCaskell read a news item about Simon Nkoli's imprisonment for anti-apartheid activism in South Africa. McCaskell subsequently co-founded the Simon Nkoli Anti-Apartheid Committee (SNAAC) in 1986. SNAAC advocated for Nkoli's release, sent him money, and organized his international speaking tour after he was acquitted. McCaskell and Nkoli regularly exchanged letters, some of which were featured in the short film A Moffie Called Simon (1986). After Nkoli's death, McCaskell submitted their correspondence to the South African Gay and Lesbian Archives.

In 2008, McCaskell co-founded Queers Against Israeli Apartheid, a group of queer pro-Palestinian activists that sought to advocate against what they viewed as pinkwashing by Israel. McCaskell served as the group's spokesperson. They marched in the annual Pride Toronto Parade over the course of several years, sparking controversy and leading some local politicians to threaten to pull funding for the event. In a 2010 article in Canadian Dimension, McCaskell drew parallels between his activism for Palestine and South Africa and compared Israeli apartheid to South African apartheid: "South Africa portrayed itself as a multi-party liberal democracy in a region of backward authoritarian states, as does Israel [...] South Africa cast itself as the victim surrounded by a continent of savage and dangerous enemies, as does Israel." The group disbanded in 2015.

=== Education and writing career ===
Beginning in 1981, McCaskell worked for the Toronto District School Board on various social equity issues, especially anti-racism. Initially, he worked as a facilitator for an anti-racist camp for high school students. For most of his education career, he worked for the Equal Opportunity Office to develop and implement equity-related programs, support groups, and materials. In 2001, McCaskell retired. A few years later he published Race to Equity (2005) about his work with the Toronto School Board.

In 2016, McCaskell published Queer Progress: From Homophobia to Homonationalism. The book covers both autobiographical material and the history of the gay rights movement in Canada between 1974 and 2014. McCaskell has written for The Body Politic and Xtra Magazine, two Canadian LGBTQ publications.

In 2026 he was presented with a Legacy Award, honoring his long career in writing and activism, at the PTP Pink Awards.

== Personal life ==
McCaskell came out as gay in 1974. A year later he met his longterm partner, Richard Fung, at the Marxist Institute of Toronto.

In 1981, McCaskell developed health issues which he suspected were caused by HIV/AIDS and enrolled in an HIV-related research study at the University of Toronto. Around 1986, diagnostic testing became available, and the research study confirmed he had HIV. After McCaskell observed the side effects of AZT, he initially decided not to take it, against his doctor's advice. He initiated HIV treatment in 1992 after his CD4 count decreased. Having lived with HIV for several decades, his story has been included in articles about HIV long-term survivors. Due to his health, he retired from his job in education in 2001.

== Selected works ==
- Race to Equity: Disrupting Educational Inequality (2005)
- “Whatever Happened to Anti-Racist Education?” Our Schools / Our Selves, vol. 19, no. 3, Spring 2010, pp. 31–45.
- "Pride: A Political History" in Any Other Way: How Toronto Got Queer (2017)
- Queer Progress: From Homophobia to Homonationalism (2016)
