= Shirley Faessler =

Canadian writer

Shirley Faessler (1921–1997) was a Canadian writer.

The daughter of Romanian immigrants, she was born in Toronto and grew up in the Kensington Market area. From 1939 to 1948, Faessler was a feature writer for the London Daily Herald; from 1948 to 1960, she worked as a bookkeeper before turning to writing full-time. She contributed short stories to the Atlantic Monthly, the Tamarack Review and the Saturday Night Review. In 1979, Faessler published the novel Everything in the Window. In 1988, she published a collection of short stories A Basket of Apples and Other Stories. Two of her stories, "A Basket of Apples" and "Lucy & Minnie", were included in the anthology The Best American Short Stories.

Faessler's stories featured Yiddish-speaking Jewish immigrants from the period before World War I.
