= Royal & Derngate =

Theatre in Northampton

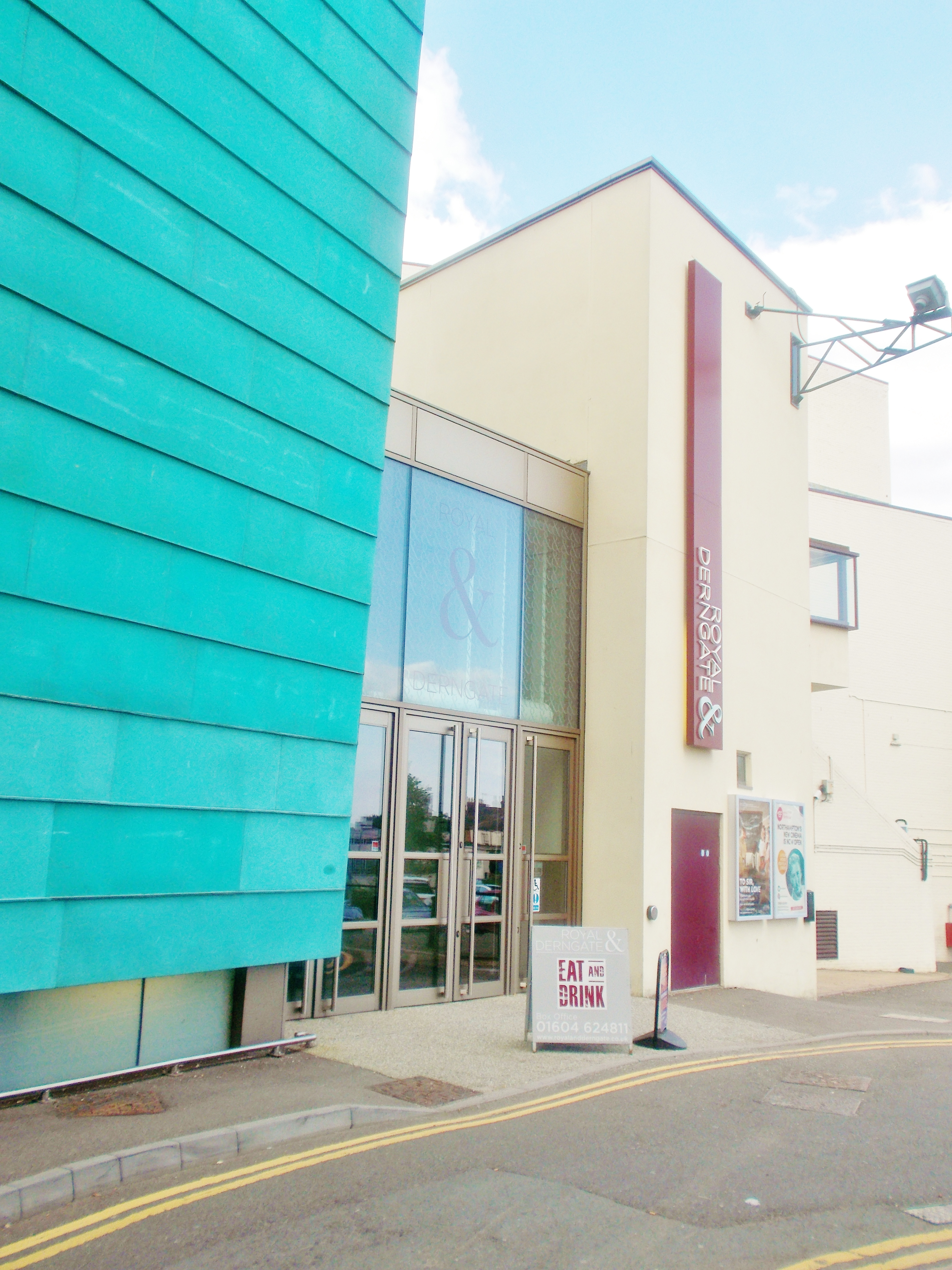
- Main entrance
- Interactive map of Royal & Derngate
- Address: 1 Guildhall Road; Northampton, Northamptonshire
- Coordinates: 52.2362°N 0.8936°W
- Owner: Northampton Theatres Trust
- Capacity: 450 (Royal); 1,200 (Derngate); 90 (Filmhouse)
- Designation: Grade II listed (Royal)
- Current use: In-House Productions; National Touring Productions; Concerts & Music Events; Comedy Shows; Talks & Lectures

Construction
- Opened: 1884 (Royal); 1983 (Derngate); 2006 (Royal & Derngate); 2013 (Errol Flynn Filmhouse)
- Rebuilt: 1887 C J Phipps (fire); 2005 (refurbishment)
- Architects: C J Phipps (Royal); Aedas RHWL (Derngate)

Website
- Royal & Derngate website

Royal & Derngate is a theatre complex in the Cultural Quarter of Northampton, England, consisting of the Royal Theatre, Derngate Theatre and the Northampton Filmhouse. The Royal was built by theatre architect Charles J. Phipps and opened in 1884. Ninety-nine years later in 1983, Derngate, designed by RHWL, was built to the rear of the Royal. Whilst the two theatres were physically linked, they did not combine organisations until a formal merger in 1999; they are run by the Northampton Theatres Trust. The Royal Theatre, established as a producing house, has a capacity of 450 seats and since 1976 has been designated a Grade II listed building; Derngate Theatre seats a maximum of 1,200 and is a multi-purpose space in which the auditorium can be configured for a variety of events including theatre, opera, live music, dance, fashion and sports. The Northampton Filmhouse, an independent cinema built to the side of the complex, opened in 2013.

In 2005, both theatres closed for an 18-month £14.5m redevelopment. The theatres were merged into one complex, a creativity centre was constructed, and the two venues were totally refurbished. The complex reopened as Royal & Derngate in October 2006. From its reopening, Laurie Sansom was artistic director; under his tenure, The Stage hailed Royal & Derngate as The Regional Theatre of the Year (2010) in its inaugural Stage 100 Awards for "its artistic quality and connections it has with local audiences."

In 2013 James Dacre took over as artistic director. The Royal & Derngate was awarded the UK Theatre Management Award for Best Presentation of Touring Theatre for its Made in Northampton co-produced work in 2015 and the UK Theatre Award for Best Touring Production in 2016. It was shortlisted for the Regional Theatre of the Year Award again in 2016, and also nominated for Theatre of the Year in The Stage 2022 Awards.

In addition to staging and producing entertainment, Royal & Derngate also provide a programme of creative projects in its Underground space. This is the site of its Youth Theatre. It also presented chances for the local community to get involved in performing, writing and finding out more about what goes on behind the scenes.

== History ==
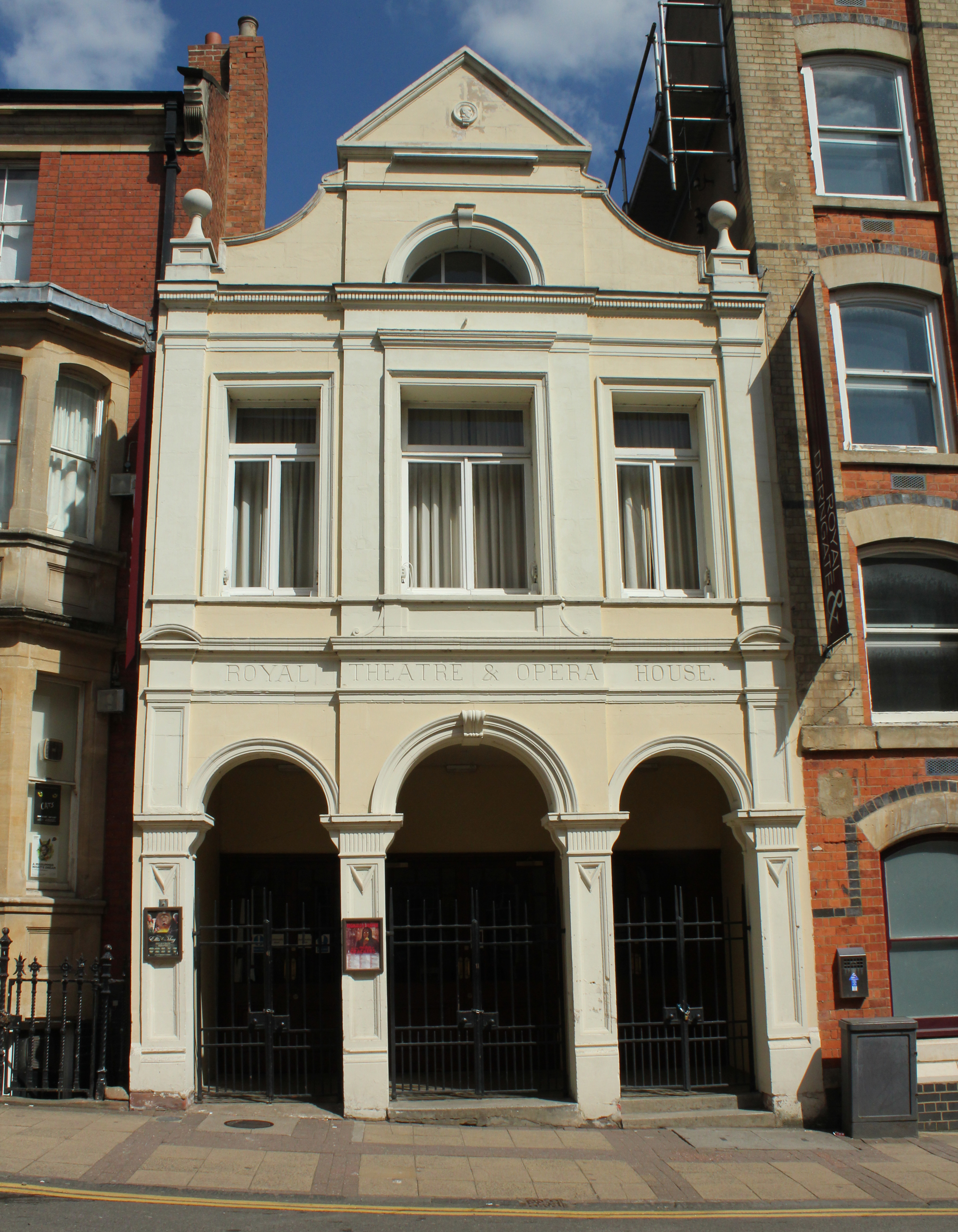
Entrance to the Royal on Guildhall Road in May 2013

The Royal Theatre was the first building of what now exists as the Royal & Derngate complex. The Royal, then called the Theatre Royal and Opera House, was built for John Franklin by Henry Martin and designed by renowned Victorian theatre architect Charles J. Phipps with mural artist Henry Bird. It opened on 5 May 1884 with a production of William Shakespeare's Twelfth Night. On the theatre's opening, The Stage newspaper reported:

No element of success was wanting to contribute to the superb triumph that crowned the opening of this new theatre; the audience which thronged every available part of the house, comprised the rank and fashion of the town and county, while the charming Thespian temple, fresh from the hand of the scene painters, gleamed everywhere with light and colour. The artistically designed scenery, the dress circle brilliant with blue and gold, the crimson rested chairs, together with the soft and delicate beauty of the ceiling and mural embellishment, were the theme of audible admiration from all parts of the house.

The theatre suffered damage from fire in 1887, and was restored by Charles J. Phipps. He was the original architect and also built the Savoy Theatre in London. The Royal's proscenium stage was widened in 1889. In the theatre's first four decades, productions of George Edwardes's musical comedies, operas, pantomimes, burlesques and melodramas were most popular. In 1927 the theatre became the home to the Northampton Repertory Players, and it has been run since as a producing house. It is supported by a workshop and wardrobe. Since 1976, The Royal has been designated a Grade II listed building.

Actor Errol Flynn made early appearances on the Royal's stage before embarking on his film career. For several months in 1933, he was part of the Northampton Repertory Players at the Royal. The Australian designer Catherine Harness was here in the 30s working with Thomas Osborne Robinson who was the decor and costume designer. In 1937 Osborne Robinson designed the costumes for Laurence Olivier at the Old Vic and despite a job offer he stayed in Northampton.

In January 1977, scenes for the Doctor Who serial The Talons of Weng-Chiang were shot inside the theatre. The serial was set in Victorian London and an authentic atmosphere was wanted for the theatre scenes. According to director David Maloney on the DVD commentary, the theatre was chosen because it had the nearest original fly gallery to London.

Derngate Theatre was added to the rear of the Royal, and was constructed on the former site of Northampton's bus station. Following its conception by Northampton Borough Council, RHWL designed the new theatre with Arup providing acoustic consultancy and engineering services. Building work started in the early 1980s. It opened on 4 April 1983 with an evening performance by singer Jack Jones.

=== Recent years ===
In 1999, the Royal Theatre and Derngate became a combined organisation, run by the Northampton Theatres Trust. In 2005, both theatres closed for an 18-month redevelopment. The total cost, £14.5 million, was received from various outlets, including £1.6m from the Heritage Lottery Fund, £2.6m from the East Midlands Development Agency and Northampton Partnership, and almost £1m from partnership funding by the theatres' development team. The redevelopment merged and totally refurbished both venues. A creativity centre was also built. 100 staff were made redundant but all were offered the opportunity of re-employment once the complex reopened. Initially, the refurbishment work was to be completed in annual periods of three-months. When it was learned that both venues needed to have asbestos removed, and rotten flooring had to be replaced in the Royal, project managers and officials decided to shut the entire venue for more than one year.

Most money was spent on making the theatres "more comfortable for the audiences"; new seats and air conditioning were installed, and other building systems upgraded. The 1980s orange décor of Derngate was replaced with lighting techniques allowing changes to the colour of the interior. The Royal was restored to its original Victorian splendour. Other improvements included the creation of a joint foyer with a new main entrance. A creativity centre for education and community work was added, together with an atrium-style performance space, a new rehearsal room, and better changing rooms for actors.

During the 18-month closure, productions were moved elsewhere. The Comedy Club moved to the Roadmender, as did the youth theatre and education work. The classical music season went to Spinney Hill Hall at Northampton School for Girls, while dance moved to The Castle theatre in Wellingborough.

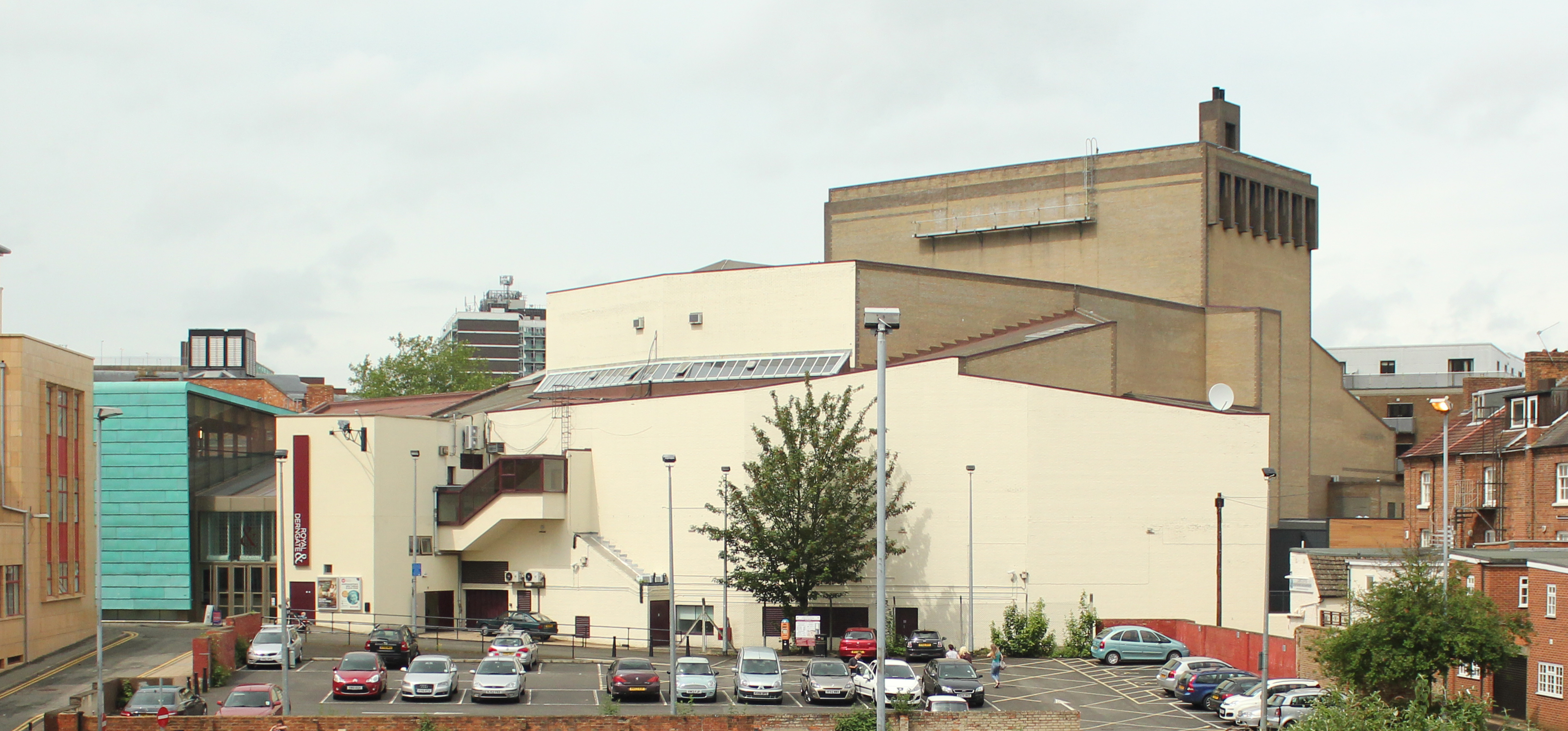
A view of the Royal & Derngate complex from Swan Street in 2013. In 2015 an hotel was constructed in the car park in front of the building and now obscures this view.

The complex reopened as Royal & Derngate in October 2006. Royal & Derngate is now the main venue for arts and entertainment in Northamptonshire. The Royal auditorium seats 530, Derngate seats 1,200-1,400 people, and the 2013 film theatre seats 90. The venue offers a diverse programme: drama, dance, stand-up comedy, classical music, children's shows, opera, and pantomime. It also hosts the annual February degree conferment ceremonies for the University of Northampton.

The venue has produced critically acclaimed shows, including Stephen Sondheim's Follies, J.B. Priestley's The Glass Cage, The Prime of Miss Jean Brodie, and Roald Dahl's James and the Giant Peach, as well as collaborating with Frantic Assembly on productions of Frankenstein and Othello. World premieres have included Arthur Miller's The Hook, Aldous Huxley's Brave New World, and a new play about Marvin Gaye, Soul by Roy Williams. For Christmas 2016, Royal & Derngate will be presenting the European premiere of Broadway sensation Peter and the Starcatcher.

On 16 November 2018, Jo Gordon was announced as the new chief executive of Northamptonshire Arts Management Trust and its venues, Royal & Derngate and The Core at Corby Cube.

== Performances ==
Royal & Derngate welcomes over 300,000 audience members each year to see work in both stages and in the Underground space. 20,000 people a year also take part in over 700 creative projects. Over 20,000 people attended a free outdoor spectacular Crackers? by The World Famous at Delapre Park. Some 80,000 people enjoyed Made in Northampton productions (productions made in-house at Royal & Derngate) that toured throughout the UK.

In 2009, to celebrate its 125th anniversary, the theatres' season included a celebration of Britain's most popular living playwright, Alan Ayckbourn, a new show created with the funny company Spymonkey, and a Young America season, featuring two rarely seen plays by Eugene O’Neill and Tennessee Williams about young people in love. Royal & Derngate also toured co-productions of Kneehigh Theatre's Brief Encounter and, with Fiery Angel, The BFG. In addition, Royal & Derngate played host to some of the biggest touring shows in the country, including the UK premiere of English National Ballet's Angelina Ballerina's Big Audition and Rambert Dance Company, which has returned since the redevelopment.

The following year, the Young America season transferred to the National Theatre in London, winning a TMA Award and being nominated for an Evening Standard Award. In 2010, Royal & Derngate developed a new charity to provide not-for-profit management services for the complex; it also established another charity to operate Corby Cube, a new theatre in Corby.

In 2011, the R & G's production of End of the Rainbow was transferred to the West End and nominated for 4 Olivier Awards. In addition, Royal & Derngate was named the Regional Theatre of the Year in the inaugural Stage 100 awards. In 2015 Royal & Derngate was shortlisted for Regional Theatre of the Year in The Stage Awards, and won the UK Theatre Award for Best Presentation of Touring Theatre. In 2016 the venue won the UK Theatre Award for Best Touring Production.

=== Touring & Regional Productions ===
The Royal & Derngate host many events across the year, with touring and regional plays & musicals being some of the most popular at the box office.

2024 Touring & Regional Season
Show	Duration	Venue	Notes
2:22 A Ghost Story	05/01/2024 - 13/01/2024	The Derngate	Original UK National Tour / 1st Cast Change Venue
Yippee Ki Yay, the Die Hard parody	11/01/2024 - 12/01/2024	The Royal	MIN Production
The Frogs	19/01/2024 - 03/02/2024	The Royal	MIN Co-Production with Spymonkey
The Mousetrap	12/02/2024 - 17/02/2024	The Derngate	UK National Tour
Houdini's Greatest Escape	13/02/2024 - 14/02/2024	The Royal	MIN Production
What's Love Got to Do with It?	25/02/2024 - 26/02/2024	The Derngate	2nd UK National Tour
Oh! What A Lovely War	26/02/2024 - 27/02/2024	The Royal	60th Anniversary Tour
Buffy	27/02/2024	The Derngate	UK National Tour
Cracking	19/03/2024	The Royal	MIN Co-Production with Theatre Royal, Plymouth
The Father	22/03/2024 - 23/03/2024	The Royal	White Cobra Theatre Co-Production
Stranger Sings	23/04/2024	The Derngate	Original UK National Tour
THE TIME MACHINE – A Comedy	26/03/2024 - 30/04/2024	The Royal	MIN Co-Production with Original Theatre
Life of Pi	02/04/2024 - 06/04/2024	The Derngate	Original UK National Tour
Moby Dick	05/04/2024 - 13/04/2024	The Royal	MIN Production Co-Production with Simple8
Shrek the Musical	23/04/2024 - 27/04/2024	The Derngate	3rd UK National Tour
King Arthur	25/04/2024 - 27/04/2024	The Royal	Le Navat Bete
West End NOW	08/05/2024 - 11/05/2024	The Royal	Northampton Musical Theatre Company
Grease	13/05/2024 - 18/05/2024	The Derngate	4th UK National Tour
Everybody's Talking About Jamie	27/05/2024 - 01/06/2024	The Derngate	2nd UK National Tour
Sister Act	10/06/2024 - 15/06/2024	The Derngate	3rd UK National Tour
Peppa Pig's Fun Day Out	03/07/2024 - 04/07/2024	The Derngate	Original UK National Tour
Madagascar: The Musical	18/07/2024 - 21/07/2024	The Derngate	Original UK National Tour
Pretty Woman: The Musical	09/09/2024 - 14/09/2024	The Derngate	Original UK National Tour
Bonnie & Clyde	22/10/2024 - 26/10/2024	The Derngate	Original UK National Tour
Footloose	29/10/2024 - 02/11/2024	The Derngate	Northampton Musical Theatre Company
Cinderella	02/12/2024 - 31/12/2024	The Derngate	Evolution Productions / Christmas Panto

2023 Touring & Regional Season
Show	Duration	Venue	Notes
The Cher Show	10/01/2023 - 14/01/2023	The Derngate	Original UK National Tour
Unexpected Twist	11/02/2023 - 25/02/2023	The Royal	MIN Production / UK Premiere
Strictly Ballroom	27/02/2023 - 04/03/2023	The Derngate	Original UK National Tour
Henry V	07/03/2023 - 18/03/2023	The Royal	
Jersey Boys	21/03/2023 - 01/04/2023	The Derngate	3rd UK National Tour
Quality Street	04/04/2023 - 08/04/2023	The Royal	MIN Production / UK Premiere
The Commitments	10/04/2023 - 15/04/2023	The Derngate	2nd UK National Tour
Wuthering Heights	24/04/2023 - 06/05/2023	The Royal	MIN Production / UK Premiere
The Best Exotic Marigold Hotel	09/05/2023 - 14/05/2023	The Derngate	Original UK National Tour
The Witness	17/05/2023 - 18/05/2023	The Royal	MIN Production / UK Premiere
Guys & Dolls	19/05/2023 - 20/05/2023	The Royal	Northampton Musical Theatre Company
1012	25/05/2023 - 26/05/2023	The Royal	MIN Production / UK Premiere
Love & Information	27/05/2023 - 28/05/2023	The Royal	MIN Production / UK Premiere
Grapes of Wrath	29/05/2023 - 30/05/2023	The Royal	MIN Production / UK Premiere
Happy Birthday Sunita	06/06/2023 - 10/06/2023	The Derngate	Rifco Theatre Company / World Premiere
The Three Musketeers	14/06/2023 - 16/06/2023	The Royal	MIN Production
And Then There Were None	07/09/2023 - 16/09/2023	The Derngate	5th UK National Tour
Oh, What a Lovely War!	02/10/2023 - 03/10/2023	The Royal	2nd UK National Tour
Greatest Days	02/10/2023 - 07/10/2023	The Derngate	Original UK National Tour
Crimes On Centre Court	04/10/2023 - 05/10/2023	The Royal	MIN Production / UK Premiere
Murder in the Dark	16/10/2023 - 21/10/2023	The Royal	Original UK National Tour
Kinky Boots	24/10/2023 - 28/10/2023	The Derngate	Northampton Musical Theatre Company
I, Daniel Blake	01/11/2023 - 04/11/2023	The Royal	Original UK National Tour
Six	27/11/2023 - 02/12/2023	The Derngate	2nd UK National Tour
It's A Wonderful Life	30/11/2023 - 02/12/2023	The Royal	White Cobra Theatre
Snow White and the Seven Dwarfs	08/12/2023 - 31/12/2023	The Derngate	Evolution Productions / Christmas Panto

2022 Touring & Regional Season
Show	Duration	Venue	Notes
Waitress	10/01/2022 - 15/01/2022	The Derngate	Original UK National Tour
Hairspray	31/01/2022 - 05/02/2022	The Derngate	5th UK National Tour
Six	15/02/2022 - 19/02/2022	The Derngate	Original UK National Tour
An Improbable Musical	25/02/2022 - 05/03/2022	The Royal	Original Regional Tour
Bedknobs & Broomsticks	01/03/2022 - 05/03/2022	The Derngate	Original UK National Tour
The Wellspring: A Memory Cycle	17/03/2022 - 26/03/2022	The Royal	MIN Production / UK Regional Tour (Opening Venue)
We Will Rock You	21/03/2022 - 26/03/2022	The Derngate	3rd UK National Tour
Fatal Attraction	29/03/2022 - 02/04/2022	The Derngate	Original UK National Tour (Opening Venue)
Bette & Joan	02/04/2022 - 03/04/2022	The Royal	MIN Production / World Premiere
The Osmonds	03/04/2022 - 07/04/2022	The Derngate	Original UK National Tour
The Gut Girls	12/05/2022 - 14/05/2022	The Royal	MIN Production
Buckets	12/05/2022 - 14/05/2022	The Royal	MIN Production
Mog The Forgetful Cat	03/06/2022 - 19/06/2022	The Royal	MIN Co-Production with the Old Vic / UK 5 Stop Tour (Opening Venue)
Dance of Death	21/06/2022 - 23/06/2022	The Royal	MIN Production
The Rocky Horror Show	04/07/2022 - 09/07/2022	The Derngate	12th UK National Tour
Playtime	02/09/2022 - 17/09/2022	The Royal	MIN Production / World Premiere
Friendsical	14/09/2022 - 15/09/2022	The Derngate	UK National Tour (Opening Venue)
The Color Purple	04/10/2022 - 08/10/2022	The Derngate	Original UK National Tour
The Two Popes	11/10/2022 - 15/10/2022	The Royal	MIN Production
The Mirror Crack'd	31/10/2022 - 05/11/2022	The Royal	MIN Production / East Midlands Tour (Opening Venue)
Calendar Girls	01/11/2022 - 05/11/2022	The Derngate	Northampton Musical Theatre Company
Dreamgirls	22/11/2022 - 26/11/2022	The Derngate	Original UK National Tour
Jack & The Beanstalk	10/12/2022 - 15/01/2023	The Derngate	Evolution Productions / Christmas Panto

2021 Touring & Regional Season
Show	Duration	Venue	Notes
Theatre Closed due to COVID-19	01/01/2021 - 15/05/2021		
Animal Farm	17/05/2021 - 22/05/2021	The Royal	National Youth Theatre & MIN Co-Production
Othello	25/05/2021 - 29/05/2021	The Royal	National Youth Theatre
Four Quartets	08/06/2021 - 12/06/2021	The Royal	National Youth Theatre
Gin Craze!	17/07/2021 - 31/07/2021	The Royal	National Youth Theatre & MIN Co-Production
Educating Rita	26/07/2021 - 31/07/2021	The Derngate	40th Anniversary UK National Tour
Priscilla, Queen of the Desert	02/08/2021 - 07/08/2021	The Derngate	Postponed 4th UK National Tour
60 Miles By Road or Rail	22/08/2021 - 26/08/2021	The Royal	MIN Production
Chicago	04/09/2021 - 10/09/2021	The Derngate	Original UK National Tour
Shrek	26/10/2021 - 30/10/2021	The Derngate	Northampton Musical Theatre Company
Blue/Orange	23/11/2021 - 04/12/2021	The Royal	MIN Production / World Premiere

2020 Touring & Regional Season
Show	Duration	Venue	Notes
Mame	07/01/2020 - 11/01/2020	The Royal	50th Anniversary UK National Tour (Closing Venue)
A Murder is Announced	13/01/2020 - 18/01/2020	The Royal	UK National Tour
Holes	24/01/2020 - 01/02/2020	The Royal	MIN Production
Beautiful: The Carole King Musical	04/02/2020 - 08/02/2020	The Derngate	2nd UK National Tour
Alone in Berlin	08/02/2020 - 29/02/2020	The Royal	MIN Production
Curtains	25/02/2020 - 29/02/2020	The Derngate	Original UK National Tour
Last of the Pelican Daughters	03/03/2020 - 07/03/2020	The Royal	Regional Tour
Everybody's Talking About Jamie	10/03/2020 - 14/03/2020	The Derngate	Original UK National Tour
Theatre Closed due to COVID-19	16/03/2020 - 31/12/2020		

2019 Touring & Regional Season
Show	Duration	Venue	Notes
Our Lady of Kibeho	12/01/2019 - 02/02/2019	The Royal	MIN Production
The Full Monty	15/01/2019 - 19/01/2019	The Derngate	2nd UK National Tour
The Mousetrap	04/02/2019 - 09/02/2019	The Derngate	65th Anniversary Tour
Caroline's Kitchen	11/02/2019 - 16/02/2019	The Royal	UK National Tour
Avenue Q	18/02/2019 - 23/02/2019	The Derngate	3rd UK National Tour
The Remains of the Day	23/02/2019 - 16/03/2019	The Royal	Original UK National Tour (Opening Venue)
Abigail's Party	04/03/2019 - 09/03/2019	The Derngate	New Victoria Theatre Co-Production
Edmond de Bergerac	09/04/2019 - 13/04/2019	The Royal	Birmingham Repertory Theatre UK National Tour
Ghost	19/04/2019 - 11/05/2019	The Royal	3rd UK National Tour
Rock of Ages	07/05/2019 - 11/05/2019	The Derngate	2nd UK National Tour
Richard III	14/05/2019 - 31/05/2019	The Royal	UK National Tour (Opening Venue)
Jekyll and Hyde	31/05/2019 - 01/06/2019	The Royal	Northampton Musical Theatre Company
The Pope	08/06/2019 - 22/06/2019	The Royal	MIN Production
Dirty Dancing	10/06/2019 - 15/06/2019	The Derngate	
Two Trains Running	31/08/2019 - 14/09/2019	The Royal	MIN Production
Buddy: The Buddy Holly Story	09/09/2019 - 14/09/2019	The Derngate	7th UK National Tour
The Woman in Black	30/09/2019 - 05/10/2019	The Royal	
Toast	07/10/2019 - 12/10/2019	The Royal	MIN Production
Calendar Girls	08/10/2019 - 12/10/2019	The Derngate	Original UK National Tour
A View from the Bridge	15/10/2019 - 26/10/2019	The Royal	2nd UK National Tour
Made in Dagenham	29/10/2019 - 02/11/2019	The Derngate	Northampton Musical Theatre Company
The Season	01/11/2019 - 30/11/2019	The Royal	MIN Co-Production with New Wolsey Theatre / World Premiere
Cinderella	06/12/2019 - 29/12/2019	The Derngate	Evolution Productions / Christmas Panto
Pippi Longstocking	10/12/2019 - 30/12/2019	The Royal	MIN Production

2018 Touring & Regional Season
Show	Duration	Venue	Notes
The Play That Goes Wrong	04/01/2018 - 07/01/2018	The Derngate	3rd UK National Tour (Opening Venue)
A Passage to India	11/01/2018 - 20/01/2018	The Royal	Regional Tour (Opening Venue)
Mamma Mia	23/01/2018 - 02/02/2018	The Derngate	2nd UK National Tour
Of Mice and Men	05/02/2018 - 10/02/2018	The Royal	UK 10 City Tour
Cilla The Musical	20/02/2018 - 24/02/2018	The Derngate	Original UK National Tour
Love from a Stranger	23/02/2018 - 17/03/2018	The Royal	MIN Production
Hamlet	27/02/2018 - 03/03/2018	The Derngate	UK National Tour
Shrek the Musical	14/03/2018 - 25/03/2018	The Derngate	2nd UK National Tour
The Selfish Giant	04/04/2018 - 07/04/2018	The Royal	MIN Production
The Last Ship	24/04/2018 - 28/04/2018	The Derngate	Original UK National Tour
Flying Lovers of Vitebsk	24/04/2018 - 28/04/2018	The Royal	MIN Production / World Premiere
Some Mothers Do 'Ave 'Em	01/05/2018 - 05/05/2018	The Derngate	Original UK National Tour
The Importance of Being Ernest	08/05/2018 - 12/05/2018	The Royal	MIN Production
Art	14/05/2018 - 18/05/2018	The Derngate	25th Anniversary UK National Tour
The Band	29/05/2018 - 09/05/2018	The Derngate	Original UK National Tour
Education, Education, Education	29/05/2018 - 02/06/2018	The Royal	MIN Production
Club Wonderland	08/06/2018 - 09/06/2018	The Royal	MIN Production / World Premiere
Titanic	25/06/2018 - 30/06/2018	The Derngate	Original UK National Tour
Bugsy Malone	07/07/2018 - 15/07/2018	The Royal	UK National Tour
The Lovely Bones	01/09/2018 - 19/09/2018	The Royal	MIN Production
Kinky Boots	19/09/2018 - 10/10/2018	The Derngate	Original UK National Tour (Opening Venue)
Touching the Void	09/10/2018 - 20/10/2018	The Royal	2nd UK National Tour / MIN Co-Production
Shoulder to Shoulder	21/10/2018 - 24/10/2018	The Royal	MIN Production
West Side Story	23/10/2018 - 27/10/2018	The Derngate	Northampton Musical Theatre Company
Private Peaceful	01/11/2018 - 02/11/2018	The Royal	Nottingham Playhouse Production
Rebus	05/11/2018 - 10/11/2018	The Royal	MIN Production / World Premiere
Rain Man	19/11/2018 - 24/11/2018	The Royal	MIN Production / UK Premiere
The Worst Witch	04/12/2018 - 30/12/2018	The Royal	MIN Production / World Premiere
Peter Pan	07/12/2018 - 30/12/2018	The Derngate	Evolution Productions / Christmas Panto

2017 Touring & Regional Season
Show	Duration	Venue	Notes
Sunny Afternoon	10/01/2016 - 14/01/2017	The Derngate	Original UK National Tour
The Full Monty	16/01/2017 - 21/01/2017	The Derngate	3rd UK National Tour
Invincible	24/01/2017 - 28/01/2017	The Royal	MIN Production / UK 8 Stop Tour (Opening Venue)
Henceforward...	06/02/2017 - 11/02/2017	The Royal	MIN Co-Production with Stephen Joseph Theatre
A Passionate Woman	07/03/2017 - 11/03/2017	The Royal	MIN Co-Production with Lyceum Theatre, Sheffield
Sister Act	27/03/2017 - 01/04/2017	The Derngate	2nd UK National Tour
Million Dollar Quartet	18/04/2017 - 22/04/2017	The Derngate	Original UK National Tour
Not Dead Enough	02/05/2017 - 06/05/2017	The Royal	MIN Production

2014 Touring & Regional Season
Show	Duration	Venue	Notes
HMS Pinafore	20/01/2014 - 25/01/2014	The Royal	
Dreamboats and Petticoats	27/01/2014 - 02/02/2014	The Derngate	3rd UK National Tour
Fallen Angels	10/02/2014 - 15/02/2014	The Royal	Revival Tour
A Tale of Two Cities	21/02/2014 - 15/03/2014	The Royal	MIN Production / UK Premiere
Animal Farm	20/02/2014 - 22/02/2014	The Royal	
Blood Brothers	24/03/2014 - 29/03/2014	The Derngate	West End Farewell Tour
Every Last Trick	18/04/2014 - 10/05/2014	The Royal	MIN Production / World Premiere
Fiddler on the Roof	22/04/2014 - 26/04/2014	The Derngate	
The Play That Goes Wrong	12/05/2014 - 17/05/2014	The Derngate	Original UK National Tour
Dealer's Choice	23/05/2014 - 16/06/2014	The Royal	First UK Revival
Let It Be	26/05/2014 - 31/05/2014	The Derngate	Original UK National Tour
Regeneration	29/08/2014 - 20/09/2014	The Royal	MIN Production / World Premiere
One Man, Two Guvnors	22/09/2014 - 27/08/2014	The Derngate	3rd UK National Tour
Cat On A Hot Tin Roof	01/10/2014 - 18/10/2014	The Royal	MIN Production / UK Regional Tour (Opening Venue)
This Is My Family	21/10/2014 - 25/10/2014	The Royal	UK Regional Tour (Opening Venue)
South Pacific	28/10/2014 - 01/10/2014	The Derngate	Northampton Musical Theatre Company
The Full Monty	10/11/2014 - 15/11/2014	The Derngate	2nd UK National Tour
The Woman In Black	10/11/2014 - 15/11/2014	The Royal	
Peter Pan	05/12/2014 - 05/01/2015	The Derngate	Evolution Productions / Christmas Panto

=== Made in Northampton Productions ===
Made in Northampton is the name given to productions that have been produced in-house at the Royal Theatre. Since re-opening, Royal & Derngate has worked with various writers, creative teams and companies to produce these shows, receiving considerable critical and commercial praise. .

Other highlights have included the premiere of Nicholas Wright's adaptation of Pat Barker's novel Regeneration, in a co-production with Touring Consortium Theatre Company in 2014. It also premiered Mike Poulton’s adaptation of A Tale of Two Cities.

The Made in Northampton 2015 season included world premieres of Arthur Miller's The Hook in a co-production with Liverpool Everyman & Playhouse, and Aldous Huxley's Brave New World in a co-production with Touring Consortium Theatre Company. The programme also included a co-production of King John with Shakespeare’s Globe, and Patrick Hamilton's classic thriller Gaslight.

Highlights of its Made in Northampton 2016 season include major tours of Peter Whelan's The Herbal Bed (Winner of Best Touring Production in the UK Theatre Awards), King Lear starring Michael Pennington, and Spymonkey's The Complete Deaths. It produced the world premiere of Soul, a new play by Roy Williams about American singer Marvin Gaye, and the European Premiere of Peter and the Starcatcher.

Shows, including 2007's 101 Dalmatians, 2018's The Worst Witch and 2019's The Season renamed Two Strangers (Carry a Cake Across New York) have gone on to be transferred to London's West End.

2024 season
Show	Duration	Director	Notes
Yippee Ki Yay, the Die Hard parody	11/01/2024 - 12/01/2024	Hal Chambers	Fringe Festival Winner
The Frogs	19/01/2024 - 03/02/2024	Toby Park & Aitor Basauri	Co-Production with Spymonkey
Houdini's Greatest Escape	13/02/2024 - 14/02/2024	James Dacre	UK Premiere
Cracking	19/03/2024	Shôn Dale-Jones	Co-Production with Theatre Royal, Plymouth
The Father	22/03/2024 - 23/03/2024	Martin Borley-Cox	White Cobra Theatre Co-Production
THE TIME MACHINE – A Comedy	26/03/2024 - 30/04/2024	Orla O’Loughlin	Co-Production with Original Theatre
Moby Dick	05/04/2024 - 13/04/2024	Simple8	Co-Production with Simple8

2023 season
Show	Duration	Director	Notes
Unexpected Twist	11/02/2023 - 25/02/2023	James Dacre	UK Premiere
Quality Street	04/04/2023 - 08/04/2023	James Dacre	UK Premiere
Wuthering Heights	24/04/2023 - 06/05/2023	Lucinka Eisler	UK Premiere
The Witness	17/05/2023 - 18/05/2023	Jo Blake	Co-Production with Carbon Theatre UK Premiere
1012	25/05/2023 - 26/05/2023	James Dacre	UK Premiere
Love & Information	27/05/2023 - 28/05/2023	Martin Borley-Cox	World Premiere
Grapes Of Wrath	29/05/2023 - 30/05/2023	Martin Borley-Cox	
Crimes On Centre Court	04/10/2023 - 05/10/2023	James Dacre	World Premiere

2022 season
Show	Duration	Director	Notes
An Improbable Musical	25/02/2022 - 05/03/2022	Josie Lawrence, Niall Ashdown and Ruth Bratt	Co-Production with The New Wolsey Theatre, Ipswich 2nd Stop on Regional Tour
The Wellspring: A Memory Cycle	17/03/2022 - 26/03/2022	James Dacre	UK Regional Tour (Opening Venue)
Bette & Joan	02/04/2022 - 03/04/2022	Martin Borley-Cox	World Premiere Northamptonshire County Tour (Opening Venue)
The Gut Girls	12/05/2022 - 14/05/2022	Martin Borley-Cox	
Buckets	12/05/2022 - 14/05/2022	Martin Borley-Cox	
Mog The Forgetful Cat	03/06/2022 - 19/06/2022	Helena Middleton & Jesse Jones	Co-Production with the Old Vic UK 5 Stop Tour (Opening Venue)
Dance of Death	21/06/2022 - 23/06/2022	Lindsay Duncan & Hilton McRae	
Playtime	02/09/2022 - 17/09/2022	Valentina Ceschi & Thomas Eccleshare	World Premiere
The Two Popes	11/10/2022 - 15/10/2022	James Dacre	
The Mirror Crack'd	31/10/2022 - 05/11/2022	James Dacre	East Midlands Tour (Opening Venue)

2021 season
Show	Duration	Director	Notes
Animal Farm	17/05/2021 - 22/05/2021	Ed Stambollouain	Co-Production with National Youth Theatre
Gin Craze!	17/07/2021 - 31/07/2021	Ed Stambollouain	Co-Production with National Youth Theatre
60 Miles By Road or Rail	22/08/2021 - 26/08/2021	James Dacre	A Northampton Story
Blue/Orange	23/11/2021 - 04/12/2021	James Dacre	

2020 season
Show	Duration	Director	Notes
Holes	24/01/2020 - 01/02/2020	James Dacre	
Alone in Berlin	08/02/2020 - 29/02/2020	James Dacre	

2019 season
Show	Duration	Director	Notes
Our Lady of Kibeho	12/01/2019 - 02/02/2019	Katori Hall	
Abigail's Party	04/03/2019 - 09/03/2019	Sarah Esdaile	New Victoria Theatre Co-Production
The Season by Jim Barne and Kit Buchan	01/11/2019 - 30/11/2019	Tim Jackson	MIN Christmas Season World Premiere, co-production with The New Wolsey Theatre, Ipswich Transferred to Off-West End renamed to Two Strangers (Carry a Cake Across New York) Telegraph Theatre Awards Best New Show
Pippi Longstocking	10/12/2019 - 30/12/2019	Mike Akers	MIN Christmas Season

2018 season
Show	Duration	Director	Notes
The Worst Witch	04/12/2018 - 30/12/2018	Emma Reeves	World Premiere Laurence Olivier Awards Family Show Transferred to West End

2017 season
Show	Duration	Director	Notes
Invincible	24/01/2017 - 28/01/2017	Christopher Harper	UK 8 Stop Tour (Opening Venue)
Henceforward...	06/02/2017 - 11/02/2017	Alan Ayckbourn	Co-Production with Stephen Joseph Theatre
A Passionate Woman	07/03/2017 - 11/03/2017	James Darcy	Co-Production with Lyceum Theatre, Sheffield

2016 season
Show	Duration	Director	Notes
The Herbal Bed by Peter Whelan	Fri 5 – Sat 27 February 2016	James Dacre	A co-production with English Touring Theatre and Rose Theatre Kingston, UK Tour UK Theatre Award for Best Touring Production
King Lear	Fri 1 – Sat 23 April 2016	Max Webster	Starring Michael Pennington UK Tour in association with Ambassador Theatre Group
Spymonkey's The Complete Deaths	Thu 5 – Sat 7 May 2016 (previews) Mon 17 - Wed 19 Oct 16	Tim Crouch	World Premiere A co-production with Spymonkey and Brighton Festival
Peepolykus' The Massive Tragedy of Madame Bovary	Tue 10 – Sat 14 May 2016	Gemma Bodinetz	World Premiere A co-production with Liverpool Everyman & Playhouse, Bristol Old Vic and Nuffield Southampton
Soul by Roy Williams	Fri 20 May – Sat 11 June 2016	James Dacre	World Premiere Starring Adjoa Andoh A co-production with Hackney Empire
The Tempest adapted by Rebecca Lenkiewicz	Thu 23 June – Sat 2 July 2016	Caroline Steinbeis	A co-production with National Youth Theatre
A Tale of Two Cities adapted by Mike Poulton with music by Rachel Portman	Sat 10 – Sat 17 September 2016	James Dacre	World Premiere A co-production with Touring Consortium Theatre Company
Peter and the Starcatcher adapted by Rick Elice	Tue 29 November – Sat 31 December 2016	Luke Sheppard	European premiere A co-production with Paul Taylor Mills
Second Star to the Right	Fri 02 Dec 16 - Sat 07 Jan 17	Jesse Jones	World Premiere

2015 season
Show	Duration	Director	Notes
Cyrano de Bergerac	Fri 3 – Sat 25 April 2015	Lorne Campbell	A co-production with Northern Stage
King John	Fri 24 April – Sat 16 May 2015	James Dacre	A co-production with Shakespeare's Globe Also performed at Temple Church, Salisbury Cathedral and Holy Sepulchre Church
The Hook by Arthur Miller	Fri 5 – Sat 27 June 2015	James Dacre	World Premiere A co-production with Liverpool Everyman & Playhouse.
Brave New World adapted by Dawn King with music by These New Puritans	Fri 4 – Sat 26 September 2015	James Dacre	A co-production with Touring Consortium Theatre Company
Gaslight by Patrick Hamilton	Fri 16 October – Sat 7 November 2015	Lucy Bailey	Starring Tara Fitzgerald
The Snow Queen by Georgia Pritchett	Wed 25 November 2015 – Sat 3 January 2016	Gary Sefton	World Premiere A co-production with Nuffield Theatre
The Herbal Bed by Peter Whelan	Fri 5 – Sat 27 February 2016	James Dacre	A co-production with English Touring Theatre and Rose Theatre Kingston, UK Tour UK Theatre Award for Best Touring Production
			Season won UK Theatre Award for Best Presentation of Touring Theatre

2014 season
Show	Duration	Director	Notes
A Tale of Two Cities, adapted by Mike Poulton	21 February – 15 March	James Dacre	World Premiere Composed by Rachel Portman
The Body of An American by Dan O'Brien	27 February – 8 March	James Dacre	European Premiere A co-production with The Gate Theatre Nominated for Evening Standard Award
Every Last Trick, adapted by Tamsin Oglesby	18 April – 10 May	Paul Hunter	World Premiere A collaboration between members of Spymonkey and Told by an Idiot
Moominsummer Madness, adapted by Phil Porter	22 May – 1 June	Dani Parr and Peter Gianville	World Premiere A co-production with Polka Theatre, in association with Little Angel Theatre
Pat Barker's Regeneration, adapted for the stage by Nicholas Wright	22 August – 20 September	Simon Godwin	World Premiere A co-production with Touring Consortium Theatre Company
Cat on a Hot Tin Roof by Tennessee Williams	1 – 18 October	James Dacre	A co-production with Northern Stage and the Royal Exchange Theatre
Merlin by Ella Hickson	26 November 2014 – 4 January 2015	Liam Steel	World Premiere A co-production with Nuffield Theatre

2013 season
Show	Duration	Director	Notes
One for the Road	1 – 23 February	Laurie Sansom	Part of Comedy Gold season
Mr Whatnot	15 March – 6 April	Cal McCrystal	Part of Comedy Gold season
A Midsummer Night's Dream	19 April – 11 May	Gary Sefton	Part of Comedy Gold season
Dancing at Lughnasa	24 May – 15 June	Richard Beecham	
To Sir, With Love	6 – 28 September	Mark Babych	World Premiere Nominated—WhatsOnStage Award for Best Regional Production
The Wind in the Willows	27 November 2013 – 5 January 2014	Gary Sefton	

2012 season
Show	Duration	Director	Notes
Oedipussy	3 – 18 February	Emma Rice	World Premiere A co-production with Spymonkey
Ladies in Lavender	6 – 21 April	Robin Lefevre	A co-production with Daniel Schumann and Lee Dean
The Bacchae	18 May – 30 June	Laurie Sansom	Part of the Festival of Chaos season
Blood Wedding	18 May – 30 June	Laurie Sansom	Part of the Festival of Chaos season
Hedda Gabler	6 – 28 July	Laurie Sansom	Part of the Festival of Chaos season
Bully Boy	24 August – 15 September	David Gilmore and Patrick Sandford	World Premiere A co-production with Lee Dean, Charles Diamond, Daniel Schumann and St James Theatre
God of Carnage	19 October – 10 November	Kate Saxon	
A Christmas Carol	28 November 2012 – 6 January 2013	Gary Sefton	
Humbug!	11 December 2012 – 13 January 2013	Dani Parr	

2011 season
Show	Duration	Director	Notes
The Years Between	4 – 26 February	Kate Saxon	Nominated—TMA Award for Best Performance in a Play
Diary of a Nobody	4 – 19 March	Gary Sefton	A co-production with Under the Radar Partnership
In Praise of Love	1 – 23 April	Richard Beecham	
Hamlet! The Musical	6 – 21 May	Ryan McBride	A co-production with Eleanor Lloyd Productions
Eden End	6 – 25 June	Laurie Sansom	
End of the Rainbow	25 August – 3 September	Terry Johnson	Post West End revival, prior to national tour A co-production with Lee Dean
Basket Case	9 – 24 September	Robin Lefevre	A co-production with Lee Dean
The Two Gentlemen of Verona	30 September – 22 October	Matthew Dunster	
The Go-Between	2 – 19 November	Roger Haines	World Premiere A co-production with Derby Live and West Yorkshire Playhouse; UK Theatre Award for Best Production of a Musical
Alice in Wonderland	30 November 2011 – 8 January 2012	Laurie Sansom and Dani Parr	

2010 season
Show	Duration	Director	Notes
End of the Rainbow	5 – 20 February	Terry Johnson	Part of Addicted to You season A co-production with Lee Dean; Revived at Trafalgar Studios, London from 2010 to 2011; Revived at Guthrie Theater, Minneapolis in 2012; Revived at Belasco Theatre, New York in 2010; Outer Critics' Circle Award and Drama Desk Award for Outstanding Actress in a Play; Nominated—Laurence Olivier Awards for Best Actress, Best New Play, Best Supporting Actor and Best Sound Design; Nominated—Tony Awards for Best Actress, Best Supporting Actor and Best Sound Design
My Zinc Bed	26 February – 13 March	Laurie Sansom	Part of Addicted to You season
Honest	26 February – 13 March	Mike Bartlett	World Premiere Part of Addicted to You season
Travels with My Aunt	30 April – 15 May	Gary Sefton	
Town	18 June – 3 July	Esther Richardson	World Premiere Part of Hometown season
Flathampton	9 – 17 July	Dani Parr	Part of Hometown season Revived in 2011
The Talented Mr. Ripley	17 September – 9 October	Raz Shaw	
The Duchess of Malfi	15 – 30 October	Laurie Sansom	Nominated—TMA Award for Best Design
The Lion, The Witch and The Wardrobe	1 December 2010 – 9 January 2011	Dani Parr	
Through the Wardrobe	7 – 19 December	Beth van der Ham-Edwards	

2009 season
Show	Duration	Director	Notes
Noël Coward's Brief Encounter	13 – 28 February	Emma Rice	Kneehigh Theatre in collaboration with Royal & Derngate; TMA Award for Best Touring Production
The BFG	12 – 28 March	Phil Clark	A co-production with Fiery Angel
Under Milk Wood	1 – 16 May	Adele Thomas	
Wish Wash	6 – 27 June	Dani Parr	
Just Between Ourselves	22 May – 13 June	Mark Rosenblatt	Part of Ayckbourn at 70 season
Private Fears in Public Places	22 June – 11 July	Laurie Sansom	Part of Ayckbourn at 70 season Nominated—TMA Award for Best Lighting Design
Man of the Moment	27 July – 15 August	Alan Ayckbourn	Ayckbourn at 70 season
Moby Dick	18 – 26 September	Jos Houben	A co-production with Spymonkey
Beyond the Horizon and Spring Storm	9 October – 14 November	Laurie Sansom	Part of Young America season Revived at London's National Theatre in 2010; TMA Award for Best Director and Best Lighting Design; Nominated—Evening Standard Award for Best Director
Honk!	1 December 2009 – 3 January 2010	Andrew Panton	

2008 season
Show	Duration	Director	Notes
The Clean House	1 – 16 February	John Dove	In association with Lee Dean
Mary Shelley's Frankenstein	22 February – 15 March	Laurie Sansom	In association with Frantic Assembly
Humble Boy	11 April – 3 May	Richard Beecham	
Laurel and Hardy	20 – 31 May	Peter Rowe	A co-production with New Wolsey, Ipswich in association with Anvil Arts
James and the Giant Peach	13 – 28 June	Dani Parr	
The Prime of Miss Jean Brodie	12 September – 4 October	Laurie Sansom	TMA Award for Best Performance in a Play; Revived at Assembly Hall, Edinburgh in 2009
Othello	7 – 18 October	Scott Graham and Steven Hoggett	Frantic Assembly and Theatre Royal Plymouth in association with Royal & Derngate; TMA Award for Best Director
The Wizard of Oz	3 December 2008 – 11 January 2009	Laurie Sansom	

2007 season
Show	Duration	Director	Notes
Twelfth Night	26 January – 17 February	Laurie Sansom	Part of A Season of Love and Madness
Soap	2 – 24 March	Laurie Sansom	Part of A Season of Love and Madness
The Way of the World	27 April – 19 May	Selina Cadell	Part of A Season of Love and Madness
Knitwits	21 April – 12 May	Dani Parr	
Closer	25 May – 16 June	Tamara Harvey	
Starseeker	22 June – 7 July	Dani Parr	
Time of My Life	21 September – 13 October	Laurie Sansom	
The Glass Cage	1 – 17 November	Laurie Sansom	
101 Dalmatians	4 December 2007 – 6 January 2008	Dani Parr	

2006 season
Show	Duration	Director	Notes
Follies	20 October – 18 November	Laurie Sansom	Nominated—TMA Award for Best Musical Production; Nominated—Whatsonstage Award for Best Regional Production
Pinocchio	5 December 2006 – 13 January 2007	Lu Kemp	

== Northampton Filmhouse ==
Northampton Filmhouse
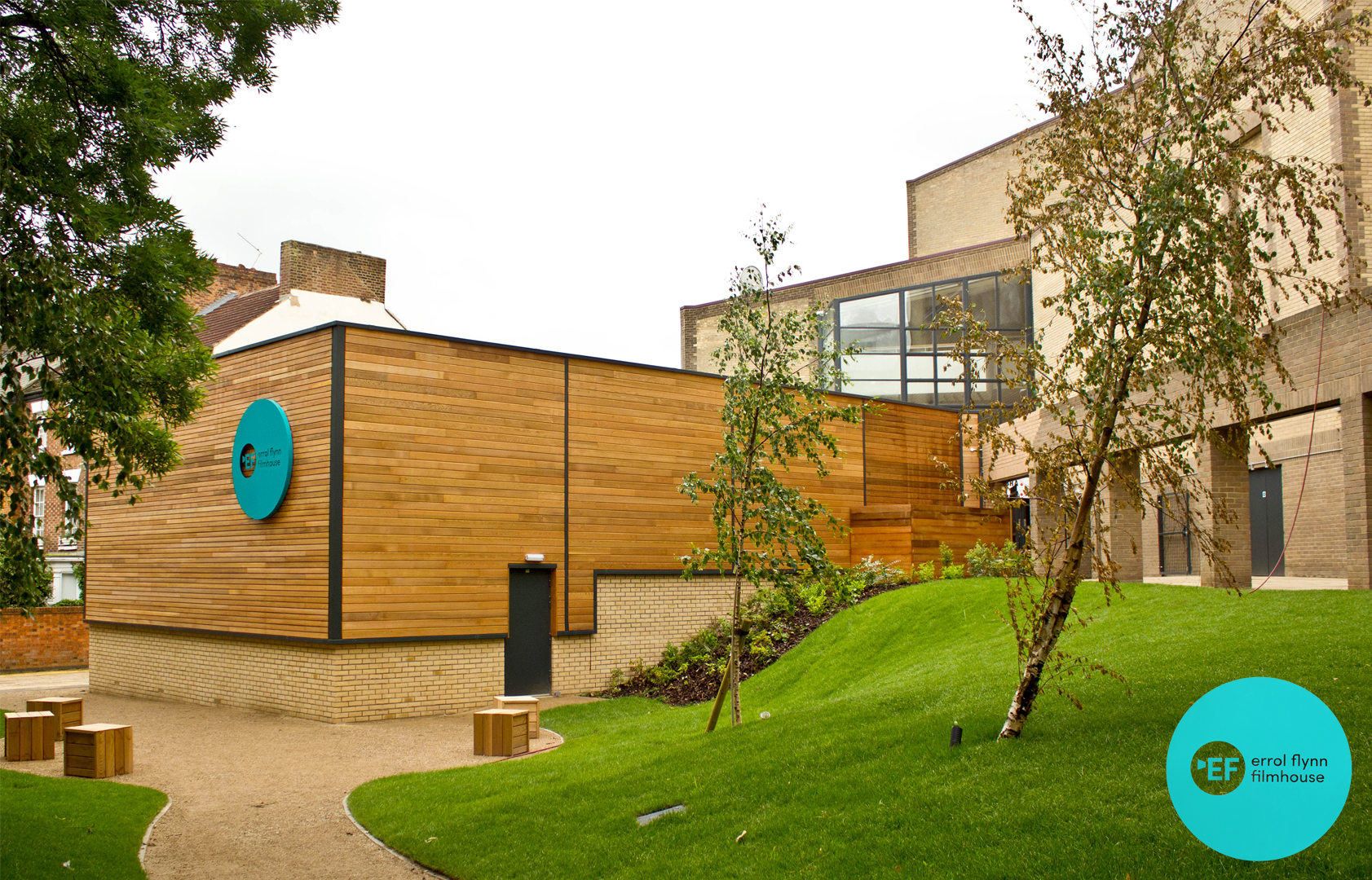
- Northampton Filmhouse is attached to Royal & Derngate
- Interactive map of Northampton Filmhouse
- Address: Derngate, Northampton, NN1 1UD
- Location: Northampton, England, UK
- Owner: Northampton Theatres Trust
- Capacity: 88
- Type: Cinema

Construction
- Built: 2013
- Opened: 2013

Website
- www.northamptonfilmhouse.com

The Northampton Filmhouse, formerly known as Errol Flynn Filmhouse until September 2018, is a cinema located in the Cultural Quarter of Northampton.The cinema has a capacity of 90 and is attached to the theatre complex. The cinema opened on 20 June 2013, the birthdate of Errol Flynn.

Due to the success of the Filmhouse, a second screen has been added to the site

=== History ===
The first film shown was Behind the Candelabra. With the first public screening being Summer in February.

== See also ==
- Listed buildings in Nottingham (Hyson Green and Arboretum ward)
- Michael Napier Brown
