= Laurie Sansom =

English theatre director (born 1972)

- Born: 1972; Kent, England
- Education: Jesus College, Cambridge
- Occupation: Theatre director
- Known for: The James Plays (2016)

Laurie Sansom (born 1972) is an English theatre director. He is currently the Artistic Director of Halifax-based theatre company Northern Broadsides.

== Early life and education ==
Sansom grew up in East Peckham, near Tonbridge, Kent. He attended the local East Peckham Country Primary School and Mascalls Comprehensive School in Paddock Wood. His early theatre training, whilst at primary school, included an amateur dramatics society in nearby Hadlow where he appeared in a number of productions including pantomime. He subsequently attended the National Youth Theatre and is an alumnus of the National Student Drama Festival.

A bright student, Sansom studied the English Tripos at Jesus College, Cambridge, graduating with a first-class degree in 1994. Involved in student theatre, his contemporaries included Rupert Goold, David Mitchell, Robert Webb, Sacha Baron Cohen and Olivia Colman, who was his flatmate.

== Career ==
Sansom was the Artistic Director and Chief Executive of the National Theatre of Scotland between 2013 and 2016.

Sansom was previously Artistic Director of the Royal & Derngate Theatre in Northampton (2006–13), Associate Director to Alan Ayckbourn at the Stephen Joseph Theatre, in Scarborough (2002–06) and an Arts Council England Trainee Director at the Watford Palace Theatre (1996–7).

In 2019, it was announced that Sansom would take over in June of that year from Conrad Nelson as Artistic Director of the theatre company Northern Broadsides.

=== National Theatre of Scotland ===
Sansom's appointment as Artistic Director of the National Theatre of Scotland was announced in October 2012 and he took up the post in March 2013.

His productions as a director at the National Theatre of Scotland include The James Plays, a co-production with Edinburgh International Festival and National Theatre of Great Britain. The historical trilogy by Rona Munro won a Herald Angel Award and the Evening Standard Theatre Award for Best Play 2014.

Sansom also wrote and directed the first stage adaptation of Muriel Spark's novella, The Driver's Seat.

=== Royal and Derngate ===
Sansom was appointed to be the new Artistic Director of the Royal & Derngate when it reopened in 2006 after a £14 million redevelopment. He took up the role in March 2006 and the venue reopened later that year.

Achievements during Sansom's tenure included the company winning the inaugural The Stage award for regional theatre of the year in 2010. Michael Billington of The Guardian newspaper named the Royal & Derngate the most exciting regional theatre of the decade.

In 2009, an adaptation of The Prime of Miss Jean Brodie directed by Sansom was successfully presented at the Edinburgh Festival Fringe. Sansom's productions of the rarely performed early plays Spring Storm by Tennessee Williams, and Beyond the Horizon by Eugene O'Neill, won him the 2010 TMA Award for Best Director and transferred to the UK's National Theatre. Sansom's Festival of Chaos trilogy - consisting of new versions of The Bacchae, Blood Wedding and Hedda Gabler - featured as part of the London 2012 Festival.
