= Margaret Wheeler =

Margaret Wheeler may refer to:

- Margaret Collingridge Wheeler (1916–1990), Australian archaeologist
- Margaret Wheeler (midwife) (1932–2024), British midwife
- Margaret Wheeler, Baroness Wheeler (born 1949), British Labour member of the House of Lords
