= Northampton High School, England =

English secondary school

Northampton High School

Location
- Newport Pagnell Road; Hardingstone, Northamptonshire, NN4 6UU; England
- Coordinates: 52.210°N 0.886°W

Information
- Type: Private day school
- Established: 1878
- Headmistress: May Lee
- Gender: Girls
- Age: 2 to 18
- Enrolment: 643 (2017)
- Houses: Selene, Artemis, Hestia, Demeter
- Colours: Blue and white
- Website: http://www.northamptonhigh.co.uk/

Northampton High School is a private day school for girls in Hardingstone, Northampton, England and is part of the Girls' Day School Trust.

== Location ==
The school is about 1 mile (1.6 km) from Northampton town centre along the Newport Pagnell road (the B526, formerly part of the A50 road) which separates the school from Wootton.

== History ==
The school was founded in 1878 by a committee of local church people. It later came under the control of the Diocese of Peterborough (Church of England), whose Board of Education used to appoint the majority of the Governors. The school eventually became a direct grant grammar school. However, on the abolition of the direct grant system during the 1970s, the school became independent.

Before moving to its current location, the school was based in Derngate, Northampton town centre. This site included 78 Derngate, a building with interiors and some windows designed by Charles Rennie Mackintosh, which was used by the school between 1964 and 1993, initially as offices and subsequently as classrooms. It is now a museum. The school moved to new premises at its present location in 1992, whose construction was financed by a grant of £13m from the Cripps Foundation, and the original site was sold for housing development.

In 2006 the school joined the Girls' Day School Trust and no longer has a formal link to the church.

A new sixth form facility costing £150,000 was opened in 2008.

The Nursery opening time was extended to 46 weeks of the year in 2013.

A new gym and fitness centre was opened by former pupil and Commonwealth Games Gold medalist Caitlin McClatchey in 2014.

== Catchment ==
Girls come from a large number of independent prep and junior schools as well as maintained primary and secondary schools within a wide area covering Northamptonshire and parts of neighbouring counties such as Buckinghamshire and Warwickshire. The vast majority of girls in the Junior School stay on to the Senior School for their secondary education. Most girls stay on into the Sixth Form and each year girls from other schools join at Year 9 (post prep) and the Sixth Form. Almost all Year 13 leavers proceed to Higher Education, either directly or following a gap year.

== Results ==
This page shows the top institutions ranked on the basis of their pupils' A/AS-level and equivalent results in 2007. In 2007, on the basis of A/AS-level and equivalent results, the school achieved an average points score of 1035.8, making it the highest ranked in the county, and 93rd in the country, among the schools with 30 exam entrants or more.

Full rankings are available at the Independent Schools Directory website and from the Independent Schools Inspectorate. The latter report showed: "strengths in many aspects of its provision [...] high quality of learning, attitudes and behaviour of the girls contributes to the academic success of the school [...] high standards in the senior school. The headmistress and senior management team provide very effective leadership and management, ably supported by the governors. Very good quality and enthusiastic teaching supports girls' attainment [...] high quality of pastoral care provided by the school contributes significantly to the personal development of the girls."

The standards of accommodation, maintenance and upkeep were: "outstanding and contribute to an excellent learning environment" and the school had no major weaknesses.

In its 2019 Educational Quality report, inspectors from the ISI said that 'pupils academic and other successes are excellent' and commented that the quality of pupils' personal and social development is also 'excellent'.

== Sport ==
The sporting facilities in the school are of a high standard and the school sport squads frequently participate in local and nationwide tournaments. The school netball team is extremely competitive and have often been ranked as number one in the Northamptonshire county tournaments. In 2019 the U16 netball team entered the national finals.

== Notable former pupils ==
Prominent old girls include:

- Helen ApSimon, air pollution expert at Imperial College London
- Joanne Campbell (1964–2002), actress
- Marcia Falkender, Baroness Falkender, formerly Marcia Williams and private secretary to Prime Minister Harold Wilson
- Anne Fine, author of Madame Doubtfire which was made into the film Mrs. Doubtfire
- Eliza Manningham-Buller, Baroness Manningham-Buller, former Director General of MI5
- Louise Pentland, author and internet personality
- Ellie Robinson, Olympic gold medallist para-swimmer
- Sasha Roseneil, sociologist
- Dame Margaret Wheeler (née Brain; 1932–2024), midwife and public servant
- Hilda Mary Woods (1892–1971), statistician

== See also ==
- Northampton School for Girls
- Northampton School for Boys
