= 78 Derngate =

Historic house museum in Northampton, England

Coordinates: 52°14′8.02″N 0°53′24.05″W

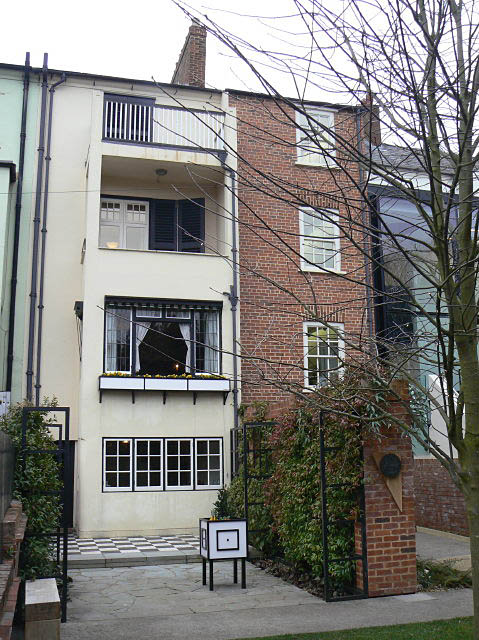
The rear of 78 Derngate

78 Derngate is a Grade II* listed Georgian house in the Cultural Quarter of Northampton, England, originally built in 1815. Its interior was extensively remodelled in 1916 and 1917 by the architect Charles Rennie Mackintosh for businessman Wenman Joseph Bassett-Lowke as his first marital home. Mackintosh's designs for the house are considered to be one of the first examples of the Art Deco style to be seen in Britain.

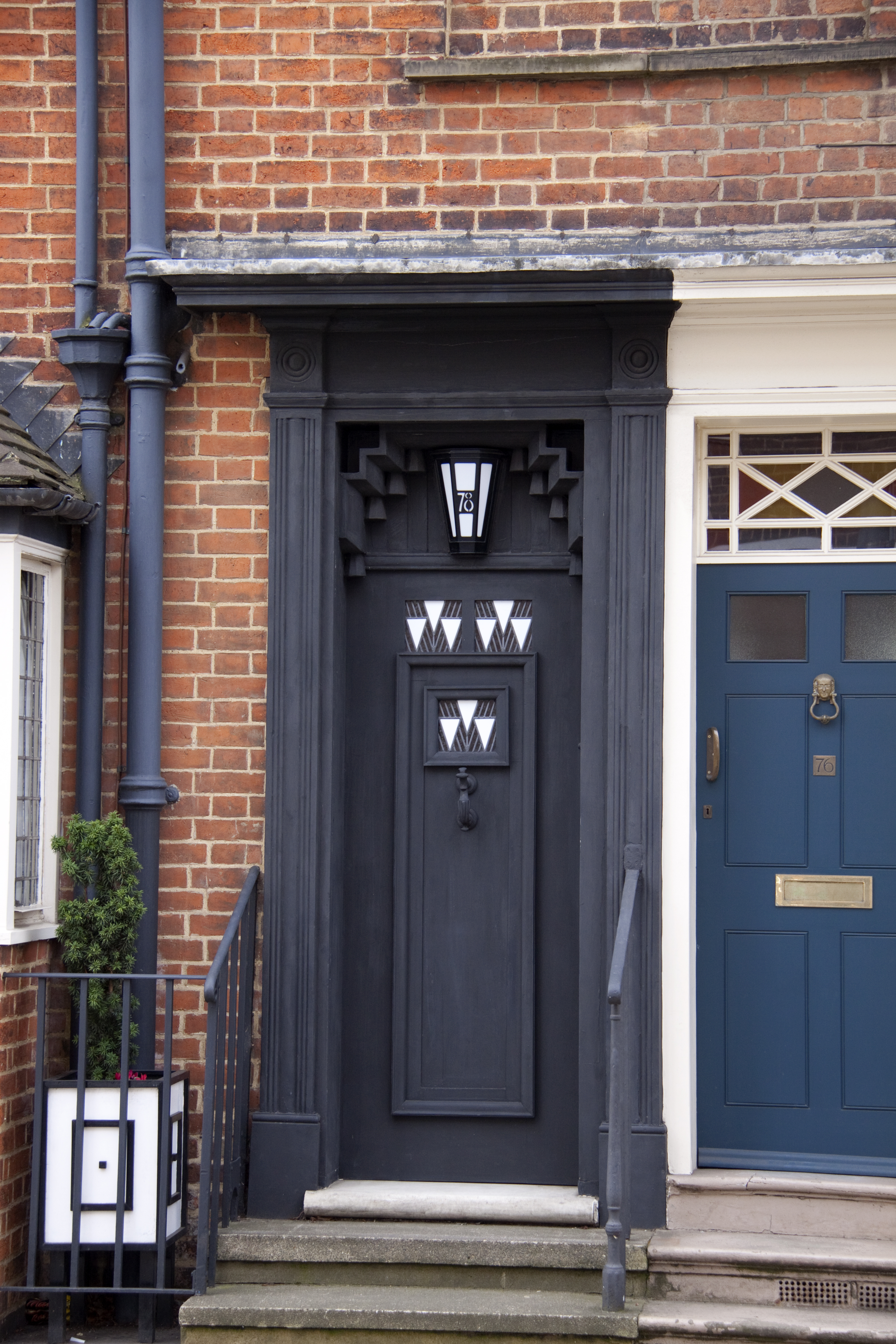
The front door

The rear elevation also features an extension with two elevated balconies which, in 1916, overlooked meadowland to the edge of Northampton. The design origins of this extension have been the subject of some scholarly debate and a myth of Mackintosh as a modernist pioneer in his late career has persisted. Recent research suggests that Bassett-Lowke and Alexander Ellis Anderson (a Northampton-based architect who supervised the remodelling) may also have had a hand in the design of this structure as well as Mackintosh.

In 1926 the Bassett-Lowkes moved to New Ways, a modernist house designed by Peter Behrens close to Abington Park; this house is also Grade II* listed.

Between 1964 and 1993 the building was used by Northampton High School for girls, initially as offices but later as classrooms. In 2002 work started to restore the house to Mackintosh's original design. This work was under the direction of architects John McAslan + Partners and involved a team of specialist contractors for restoration, or replication of, the original features of the Mackintosh period scheme.

After eighteen months of restoration, the house was opened to the public in late 2003. Small group guided tours or self-guided visits are available and provide an insight into this Mackintosh-designed house in England.

A supporting museum adjoins 78 Derngate and is housed in number 80. In 2003, the Discovery Channel aired a documentary series hosted by Eric Knowles titled The House That Mackintosh Built. The series followed aspects of the property restoration as it was in progress. In May 2007 a new visitors centre at 82 Derngate was opened to provide further facilities and exhibitions for visitors. This building, also restored by John McAslan + Partners, houses a restaurant, art galleries, meeting rooms, shop, visitor reception and administration offices. A regular programme of exhibitions and events is offered and an active 'Friends of 78 Derngate' group continues to raise funds for ongoing development of the project. On 3 October 2013, Prince Richard, Duke of Gloucester, visited 78 Derngate to commemorate the 10th anniversary of its opening to the public.

On 21 March 2017 a commemoration of the 100th anniversary of the marriage of W. J. Bassett-Lowke and Florence Jane Jones was held at 78 Derngate. A centenary exhibition, "Charles Rennie Mackintosh & The Great War" ran from 1 February – 29 April 2017. This comprised exhibits from the late career of Mackintosh and examined the wider context for his work on 78 Derngate against the background of the First World War. The exhibition was the largest display of Mackintosh design in England. A series of related events during the exhibition run featured experts giving public talks and workshops on related themes.

Artist and television presenter Lachlan Goudie featured 78 Derngate in his BBC documentary, Charles Rennie Mackintosh: Glasgow's Neglected Genius. This was produced to mark the 150th anniversary of Mackintosh's birth and was first broadcast on BBC Two Scotland on 5 June 2018. Goudie assessed the work on 78 Derngate as "[t]he dazzling work of an artist willing to risk losing control", with the interior decor being presented as a bold 'comeback attempt' by Mackintosh which was to prove to be in vain against the background of the First World War.
