= The Hook (screenplay) =

- Original language: English
- Written by: Arthur Miller
- Characters: Marty Ferarra, Therese Ferrara, Irene Ferrara, Mama, Barney, Rocky
- Genre: Screenplay

The Hook is an unproduced screenplay by American playwright Arthur Miller. It was written in 1947 and was intended to be produced by Columbia Pictures Studio, Hollywood, and to be directed by Elia Kazan. The screenplay was inspired by the true story of Pete Panto, a young dockworker who stood up against the corrupt Mafia-connected union leadership. Panto was discovered dead in a pit outside New York eighteen months after his disappearance. Set in the Red Hook district of Brooklyn, The Hook is the story of Marty Ferrara, a longshoreman who is "ready to lay down his life, if need be, to secure one thing – his sense of personal dignity."

== History ==
Kazan and Miller traveled to Los Angeles to pitch the screenplay to Harry Cohn, the notoriously controlling head of production at Columbia Pictures. Marilyn Monroe posed as Kazan's personal assistant by way of a practical joke. (This is referred to in both Miller's and Kazan's autobiographies.) Cohn insisted Miller meet Roy Brewer, Hollywood’s most powerful union leader, who pushed him to portray union corruption as couched in Communism. Cohn insisted that Kazan get Miller to change the screenplay. Miller eventually withdrew the script. He returned home to a telegram from Cohn: "ITS INTERESTING HOW THE MINUTE WE TRY TO MAKE THE SCRIPT PRO-AMERICAN YOU PULL OUT." Within three years, Kazan was in front of the HUAC, naming eight former colleagues as Communists. Miller was called in 1956, convicted of contempt of court and cleared two years later.

== Characters ==
- Marty Ferarra, Italian-American longshoreman
- Therese Ferrara, Marty's wife, mother of their three children
- Irene Ferrara, their eldest child
- Mama, Therese’s mother
- Barney, longshoreman team leader
- Barney's widow
- Rocky, the pier boss
- Farragut, the union delegate
- Phil, the hiring boss
- Mr. Hinkle, a business owner
- Louie, the union president
- Dark Eyes, a man blinded by the mob
- Piggy Logan, a longshoreman
- Old Dominic, a longshoreman
- Little Dominic
- Charlie
- Foreman
- Enzo
- Meathead
- Sleeper
- Sal
- Pete

== Plot ==
This synopsis is based on the BBC Radio adaptation.

The drama's opening setting is in a cafeteria filled with longshoremen who are waiting to hear if the man in a beaver cap who is getting instructions over the phone will be putting together a ‘gang’ or team of men for the day’s work. The man in the beaver cap is Barney. He gets instruction to handle the cargo on Pier 71 and starts to put together his gang. Phil hands out the brass counters which entitle each man to a day’s work and pay. When he gets to the last counter, he tosses it in the air so that Charlie and another man have to scrap to get possession of it. Charlie loses out. Mr. Hinkle puts pressure on Phil who then puts pressure on the gang bosses Barney and Marty to finish their work as quickly as possible in order to turn a profit. Barney and Old Dominic are driving the winch. Old Dominic uses the winch wisely, but Rocky takes over, and despite Barney’s efforts to stop him, Rocky works the winch faster and faster, until there is a huge crash. There is a tangle of steel. Beneath the wreckage is Barney’s lifeless body. Charlie asks for his job. Marty is distraught.

At Barney’s funeral, Marty passes around the beaver cap for donations. He lays the cap full of money in Barney’s widow lap. Meanwhile, Louie and Farragut are at the union headquarters. Rocky overhears their conversation. Louie has recently returned from a six-week vacation to Florida. He has missed Barney’s funeral to attend his daughter’s graduation. He takes cash from the union safe. Rocky asks Louie to talk to the ship-owners, to get them to stop putting profits ahead of safety. Louie arrives at the funeral, contributing cash to the beaver cap. He tries to serve as a pallbearer but Marty, filled with indignation and grief does not allow him to touch Barney’s casket. In private, Therese, Marty’s wife reprimands him for his behavior which could jeopardize his chances of future work. Piggy praises him and asks him to take Barney’s place as a leader. Marty leaves, determined to find other work away from the docks. Therese reminds him of the three children they must provide for.

Marty is working in a factory but the work is dull, he does not have a sympathetic foreman, and he misses the docks. He leaves the job and avoids his wife by spending time in the public park. Marty finds Piggy Dolan at Rocky’s place. Rocky is running a book and Piggy has taken up betting on horses because he can only find work one day a week at the docks. Rocky advises Marty to agitate the longshoremen and in return he will support him. Rocky wants to sever links with the mob, to regain a good name, and turn legitimate businessman. However, Marty does not believe it is possible and instead asks Rocky to give him work as a bookie.

Marty returns to his tenement home. It is his eldest daughter Irene’s birthday. Marty admits to Therese that he has become a bookie. Therese worries that he could be arrested. Irene overhears. Later, they eat their shop-bought birthday cake and Irene is given a fountain pen. She begins to cry, afraid that Marty may be arrested. He assures her he will not be. She makes a birthday wish for a couch.

Marty hears that Louie is selling union membership books to strangers for seventy-five dollars apiece, meaning that the local union members cannot get any work. He confronts Louie who warns him to mind his own business. Consequently, Marty is arrested by the police numerous times and gets a criminal record. Irene witnesses his latest arrest. Marty is ashamed. He goes to Piggy, whose home is practically bare and whose wife has left him with five small children to care for. Marty finds that in a back room of Piggy’s house the longshoremen are holding a meeting to determine how to overthrow Louie. Marty witnesses how timid the men are and he reprimands them for it. One of the longshoremen reverses the situation on Marty, reprimanding him for not leading the men in a revolt against Louie. Marty is disturbed by this. Tensions rise at the dockyard. The men refuse to continue work until they are paid. Louie threatens to cancel the union membership of any worker who refuses to work. Marty urges the workers to remain united and resolute. To placate the workers, Farragut schedules a union meeting.

Tensions rise at the dockyard. The men refuse to continue work until they are paid. Louie threatens to cancel the union membership of any worker who refuses to work. Marty urges the workers to remain united and resolute. Incensed when his couch and television are repossessed, Marty takes action, nominating himself for local union leader. Marty speaks to the people, promising to limit the sling load on the winches so that accidents like the one which killed Barney cannot happen again. The workers are suspicious that once he is president he will no longer care about longshoremen, but Marty shows them that they are responsible for the type of leader they have, ‘You know why we got no democracy in this here union? Because you guys do not care. How many of yous [sic] come to our meeting? Six? Seven? There’s nearly seven hundred in this here local.’

Louie, sensing that Marty may have a chance of winning the election, asks Rocky to stand for president in order to split the vote. Rocky will only do it if Louie gives him a pier. Louie refuses. Rocky offers to give Marty and followers a team of men to protect them from Louie’s men, but Marty refuses because he does not want his campaign to be sullied by gangsters. Rocky leaves angrily and informs Louie that Marty has money to publish a leaflet. He then double-crosses Louie, going to Marty’s apartment, and informing him that two of Louie’s men are about to rob him. They attack the two men. Louie declares war.

Farragut tells Dark Eyes to watch out for automobiles because the war is on. He wants Marty to know that Farragut gave him the tip. A car drives at Marty and his followers, injuring Piggy. Therese implores Marty to allow Rocky to provide him with protection. Enzo is out campaigning for Marty, telling them that longshoreman work is only less dangerous than lumberjack work. Rocky’s men stop workers from asking Enzo any questions. Marty realizes that Rocky’s men are hindering them from gaining the trust of the workers. He shows Marty the pier beneath which the last clean union candidate’s body was found. Enzo tells Marty that he must separate himself from Rocky by making a public speech in which he denounces Rocky as a gangster. If Rocky should start, Enzo advises open street warfare. Enzo makes the speech, Rocky spits in his face, and the workers desert him. Marty goes to Rocky’s place and calls him a punk to his face. He advises Rocky to apologize to Enzo if he wants a good name in the neighborhood. He shakes Enzo’s hand and the people are amazed.

The polling is closing. Louie tells Farragut to stuff the ballot box with phony votes because he fears Marty’s popularity. Farragut removes the ballot box to a private room. Marty’s men protest, but Farragut delays them by asking them to find where in the union bylaws it says that the counting of the votes must be public. Farragut starts counting the ballots, but with Marty and his men about to produce the bylaw that says they can watch the vote, Louie quickly stuffs the box. Marty receives 120 votes and Louie receives 631 votes. Marty insists on seeing the ballots, but the police escort Marty and his men out.

Marty and the men wait until late that night and then install themselves in the union hall. They barricade themselves in. Hefferman warns Louie to clear them out. Farragut warns him to give the men the ballots. He reasons that workers these days know their rights, they fought in the Great War, and they will achieve democracy. Farragut double-crosses Louie, giving Sal the combination number to the safe in which the ballot box is locked to give to Marty. Louie has the building surrounded with his hoodlums, ready to attack Marty and his men. The safe is opened and Old Dominic counts the ballots. They realize that Marty received 164 votes, but that it was still not enough for him to have won. Marty thinks at first that Louie must have thrown away most of votes which he got. However, the men realize that that did not happen. They realize that even some of the men are Marty’s followers did not vote for him because they lost faith in him. Louie offers to make Marty delegate. Marty is on the point of accepting, but Old Dominic gives him five dollars, something he has never done before, in order for Marty to go on campaigning, saying that Marty has taught him what America means. Marty leaves the union hall, determined to go on, to fight people like Louie, his smile widening, and the people watching him as he goes forward.

== Stage adaptation ==
The screenplay was adapted for the stage by Ron Hutchinson, directed by James Dacre and designed by Patrick Connellan for the Royal and Derngate Theatre, Northampton. It premiered in June 2015. Dacre remarked that the play was especially relevant because of the increase in zero-hours contracting in the UK following the credit crunch and economic downturn. The play received mostly positive reviews.

== Radio adaptation ==
The Hook was adapted and produced for radio by Lawrence Bowen. It was directed by Adrian Noble. It aired as part of a BBC Radio 4 season of radio adaptations of unproduced screenplays by major authors of the 20th century including Harold Pinter, Arthur Miller, Orson Welles and Ernest Lehman. It featured the voice talents of, amongst others, David Suchet, Eliot Cowen and Tim Piggot-Smith and was broadcast for the first time in October 2015.
