= James Dacre =

British theatre director

- Born: James Charles Dacre; May 1984 (age 42)
- Education: Eton
- Alma mater: Jesus College, Cambridge; Columbia University School of the Arts
- Occupation: Theatre director
- Title: Artistic director, Royal & Derngate
- Parents: Paul Dacre; Kathleen Dacre
- Relatives: Peter Dacre (grandfather)
- Website: www.jamesdacre.com

James Charles Dacre (born May 1984) is a British theatre, opera and film director and producer. He was artistic director of Royal & Derngate Theatres in Northampton from 2013-2023 and prior to that held Associate Director roles at The New Vic Theatre, Theatre503 and The National Youth Theatre.

== Early years ==
James Dacre was born in 1984, the son of Paul Dacre, former editor of the Daily Mail. He won a King's Scholarship to Eton where he won the Newcastle Scholarship. He then studied Theology, Religion and Philosophy of Religion at Jesus College, Cambridge where he edited Varsity, the student newspaper and directed at the ADC, taking several productions to the Edinburgh Festival. On graduating, he won a Fulbright Scholarship and Shubert Fellowship to study Theatre Directing at Columbia University School of the Arts in New York. Dacre then worked as an assistant director to twelve directors including Anne Bogart, Robert Woodruff and Silviu Purcărete, and trained on the ITV/Channel 4 regional theatre director scheme at the New Vic Theatre in Stoke-on-Trent.

== Career ==
On returning from America, Dacre directed and produced The Mountaintop, which transferred to the West End and went on to become the surprise winner of the 2010 Olivier Award for Best New Play. Subsequently, he became Associate Director at the New Vic Theatre and Theatre503 and directed in the West End and at Shakespeare's Globe, Royal Exchange Theatre, Royal National Theatre and many regional theatres before taking up his current role at Royal & Derngate. He held this role for a decade, producing more than 120 shows of which 60 toured both nationally and internationally and 42 transferred to London and were recognised with Olivier, Evening Standard, WhatsOnStage and The Stage awards.

In 2015, Royal & Derngate won the UK Theatre Award for Best Presentation of Touring Theatre, for an ambitious season of productions staged nationwide, including the world premiere of Arthur Miller's The Hook produced to mark the centenary of his birth and Shakespeare's King John staged at Shakespeare's Globe, Salisbury Cathedral, Temple Church and The Holy Sepulchre to celebrate the 800th anniversary of the signing of Magna Carta.

In 2016, Royal & Derngate was shortlisted for The Stage's Regional Theatre of the Year Award, having reached more than half a million audiences across the UK and toured to over 65 theatres that year. Also in 2016, Dacre's production of The Herbal Bed won Best Touring Production at the UK Theatre Awards. In 2019/20 the venue was chosen as Outstanding Theatre of the Year by Michael Billington won the Olivier Award for Best Family Entertainment. Dacre directed the world premiere of The Two Popes by Anthony McCarten with Anton Lesser and Nicholas Woodeson, which was subsequently adapted into the 2020 Oscar, Golden Globe and BAFTA nominated film The Two Popes.

== Selected work ==
- King John by William Shakespeare (Royal & Derngate, Shakespeare's Globe, Temple Church, Salisbury Cathedral and UK Tour to mark the 800th Anniversary of Magna Carta), 2015 UK Theatre Award for Best Presentation of Touring Theatre
- The Herbal Bed by Peter Whelan (Royal & Derngate, English Touring Theatre, Rose Theatre Kingston), 2016 UK Theatre Award for Best Touring Production
- World Premiere of The Mountaintop by Katori Hall (Trafalgar Studios), 2010 Olivier Award for Best New Play, nominated for a further five Olivier, Whatsonstage and Evening Standard Awards
- World Premiere of Aldous Huxley's Brave New World, adapted by Dawn King, composed by These New Puritans, (Royal & Derngate and National Tour)
- World Premiere of Roy Williams' Soul, (Royal & Derngate and Hackney Empire)
- World Premiere of Arthur Miller's The Hook, (Royal & Derngate and Everyman Theatre)
- As You Like It by William Shakespeare (Shakespeare's Globe, UK and European Tour and 2012 revival)
- King James Bible (Royal National Theatre)
- Premiere of Holy Warriors by David Eldridge (Shakespeare's Globe)
- The Accrington Pals by Peter Whelan (Royal Exchange Theatre), 2013 TMA Award for Best Design Team
- Cat on a Hot Tin Roof by Tennessee Williams (Royal & Derngate and Royal Exchange Theatre) and Northern Stage, with original music by White Lies
- Premiere of A Tale of Two Cities adapted by Mike Poulton, composed by Rachel Portman, (Royal & Derngate and UK Tour) 2014 TMA nomination for Best Design Team.
- European premiere of The Body of an American by Dan O'Brien (Gate Theatre) and (Royal & Derngate), nominated for an Evening Standard Award
- Premiere of The Thrill of Love by Amanda Whittington (New Vic Theatre and Stephen Joseph Theatre) before transferring to St. James Theatre, finalist for the 2013 Writers Guild Best New Play Award.
- Premiere of Judgement Day by Mike Poulton, after When We Dead Awaken by Henrik Ibsen (The Print Room), Ian Charleson Best Actress Commendation
- European premiere of 4000 Miles by Amy Herzog (Bath Theatre Royal) and (The Print Room), 2013 Pulitzer Prize Finalist
- Bus Stop by William Inge (New Vic Theatre and Stephen Joseph Theatre)
- Premiere of Precious Little Talent by Ella Hickson (Trafalgar Studios), Best Play, London Theatre Festival Awards 2011, nominated for an Evening Standard Award
- Co-Directed premiere of The Unconquered by Torben Betts (Stellar Quines Theatre Company, UK Tour and Off-Broadway Transfer)
- Desire Under the Elms by Eugene O'Neill (New Vic Theatre)
- Premiere of Orpheus and Eurydice: A Myth Underground in a new adaptation by Molly Davies with music by James Johnston, Nick Cave and the Bad Seeds (National Youth Theatre / Old Vic Tunnels)
- Premiere of The Error of Their Ways by Torben Betts (HERE Arts Centre, New York)
- Copenhagen by Michael Frayn (New Vic Theatre)
- Baal by Bertolt Brecht (Riverside Church, New York)
- Broken (An adaptation of Ernst Toller's Hinkemann by Torben Betts, 2012)
- Orpheus in the Underworld by Jacques Offenbach (Cambridge Arts Theatre)
- Premiere of PMQ by Ella Hickson (Theatre503 and HighTide)
