= Happy Endings (short story) =

- Short story by Margaret Atwood
- Language: English
- Genre(s): Metafic

Publication
- Published in: 1983

"Happy Endings" is a short story by Margaret Atwood. It was first published in a 1983 Canadian collection, Murder in the Dark, and highlighted during the nomination period for the 2017/2018 Galley Beggar Press Short Story Prize.

The short story includes six different stories, labeled A to F, which each quickly summarize the lives of its characters, eventually culminating in death. The names of characters recur throughout the stories and the stories reference each other (e.g. "everything continues as in A"), challenging narrative literary conventions.

In addition, the story explores themes of domesticity, welfare, and success.

Though the story boasts multiple scenarios, Atwood declares in her writing the only "authentic ending" is the one where John and Mary die. This gives readers six scenarios, and one ending.

Atwood has spoken on the story saying, "l did not know what sort of creature it was. lt was not a poem, a short story, or a prose poem. lt was not quite a condensation, a commentary, a questionnaire, and it missed being a parable, a proverb, a paradox. lt was a mutation. Writing it gave me a sense of furtive glee, like scribbling anonymously on a wall with no one looking....lt was a little disappointing to learn that other people had a name for such aberrations [metafiction], and had already made up the rules."

== Characters ==
John
He is one of the main characters of the short story. In A, he is in love with Mary and is happily married to her. In B, he doesn't feel the same way Mary does for him as he only uses her for her body. He eventually takes a woman named Madge to a restaurant and marries her instead of Mary. In C, he is a middle-aged man married to Madge but is in love with twenty-two-year-old Mary. One day he sees Mary with another man and shoots both of them before shooting himself.

Mary
She is the main character of the short story. In A, she is happily married to John and had children with him. In B, Mary is in love with John but is saddened with the fact that he doesn't love her. In C, she is a twenty-two-year old who is in love with James. She is shot by John.

James
He is a twenty-two-year-old whom Mary has feelings for. He isn't ready to settle down and prefers to ride his motorcycle. He wants to be free while he's still young. One day, he and Mary have sex. He is shot by John towards the end. He doesn't appear anywhere else.

Madge
In B, Madge is John's love interest. She is taken to a restaurant and eventually, they get married. In C, she is John's wife. In D, she meets a man named Fred.

Fred
He is the man Madge meets. They both have sex and then die.
