= Good Bones and Simple Murders =

First US edition (publ. Doubleday)

Good Bones and Simple Murders is a book by Canadian author Margaret Atwood, originally published in 1994. Although classified with Atwood's short fiction, it is an eclectic collection, featuring parables, monologues, prose poems, condensed science fiction, reconfigured fairy tales, as well as Atwood's own illustrations. Much of the book is a reprint of two earlier Atwood works, Good Bones and Murder in the Dark.

The story "Gertrude Talks Back" sees Gertrude, mother of Hamlet setting her son straight about Old Hamlet's murder: "It wasn't Claudius, darling, it was me!"
