= Cultural Quarter, Northampton =

Council initiative in Northampton, England

Coordinates: 52.2365°N 0.8930°W

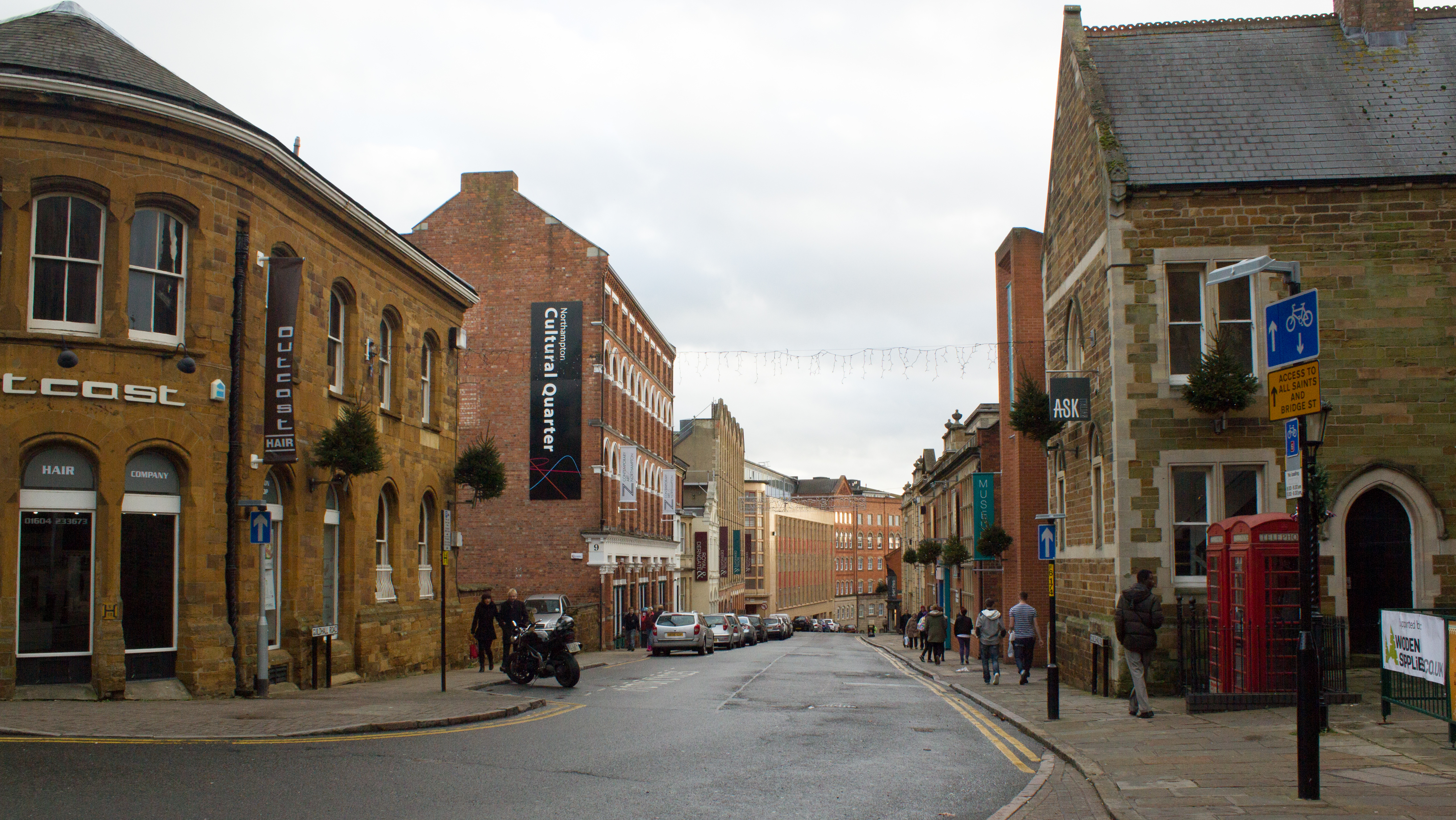
Northampton's Cultural Quarter, from the front of the Guildhall looking south down Guildhall Road

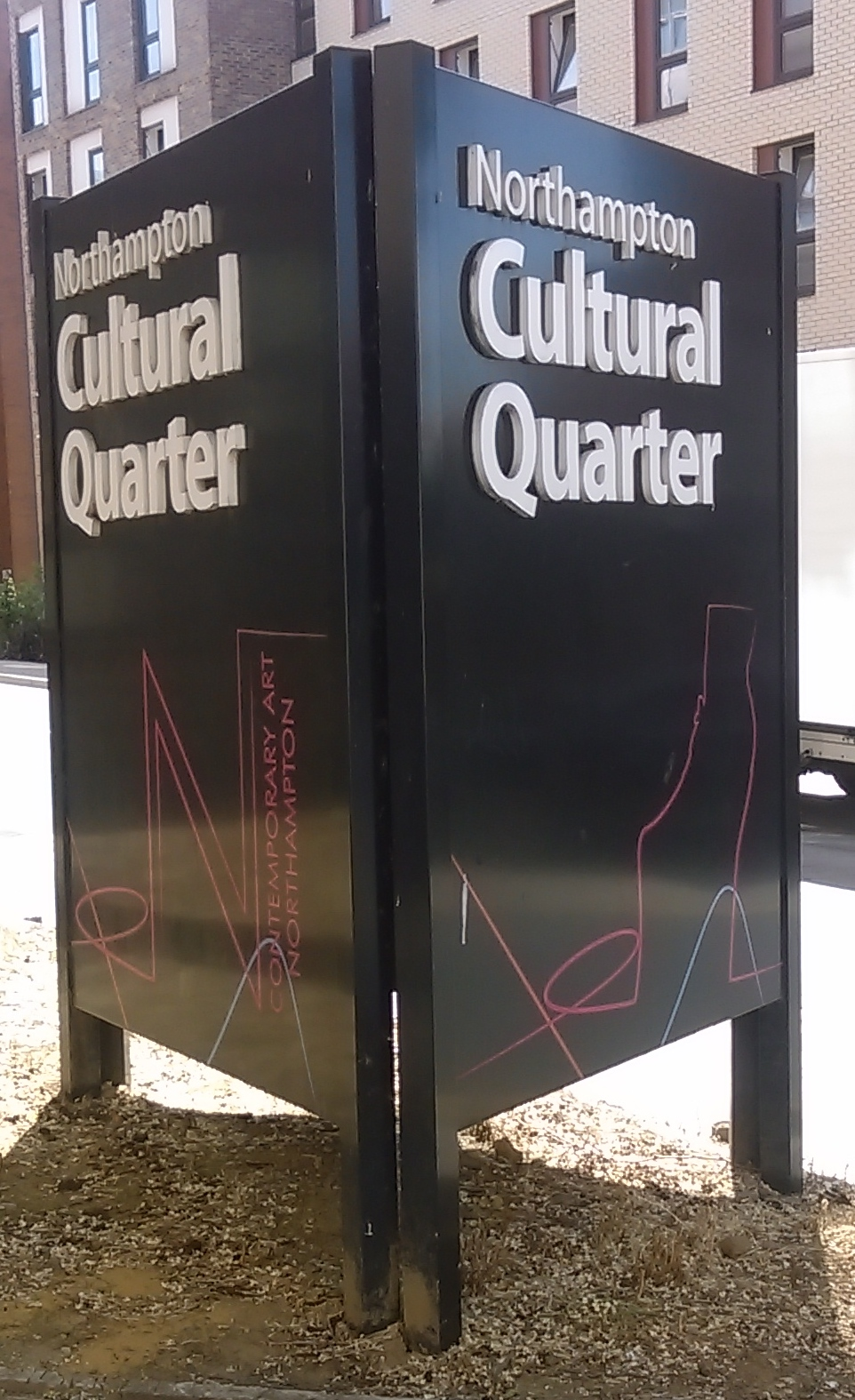
A sign marking the boundaries of the Cultural Quarter

The Cultural Quarter of the town Northampton, England, is a local council initiative to promote the area of the town centre which contains the theatre and museum. Part of it was referred to as Derngate, the name of a gate in the old town walls.

The re-branding was launched in early 2013. It encompasses the Northampton Museum, theatre complex Royal & Derngate, a historic house 78 Derngate, an art gallery NN Contemporary Art and a cinema, the Errol Flynn Filmhouse. Bars, restaurants, pubs, hair salons and fashion shops, housing and offices are included. Northampton High School for Girls was once located in the zone. Its site has since been sold for housing.

== 78 Derngate ==
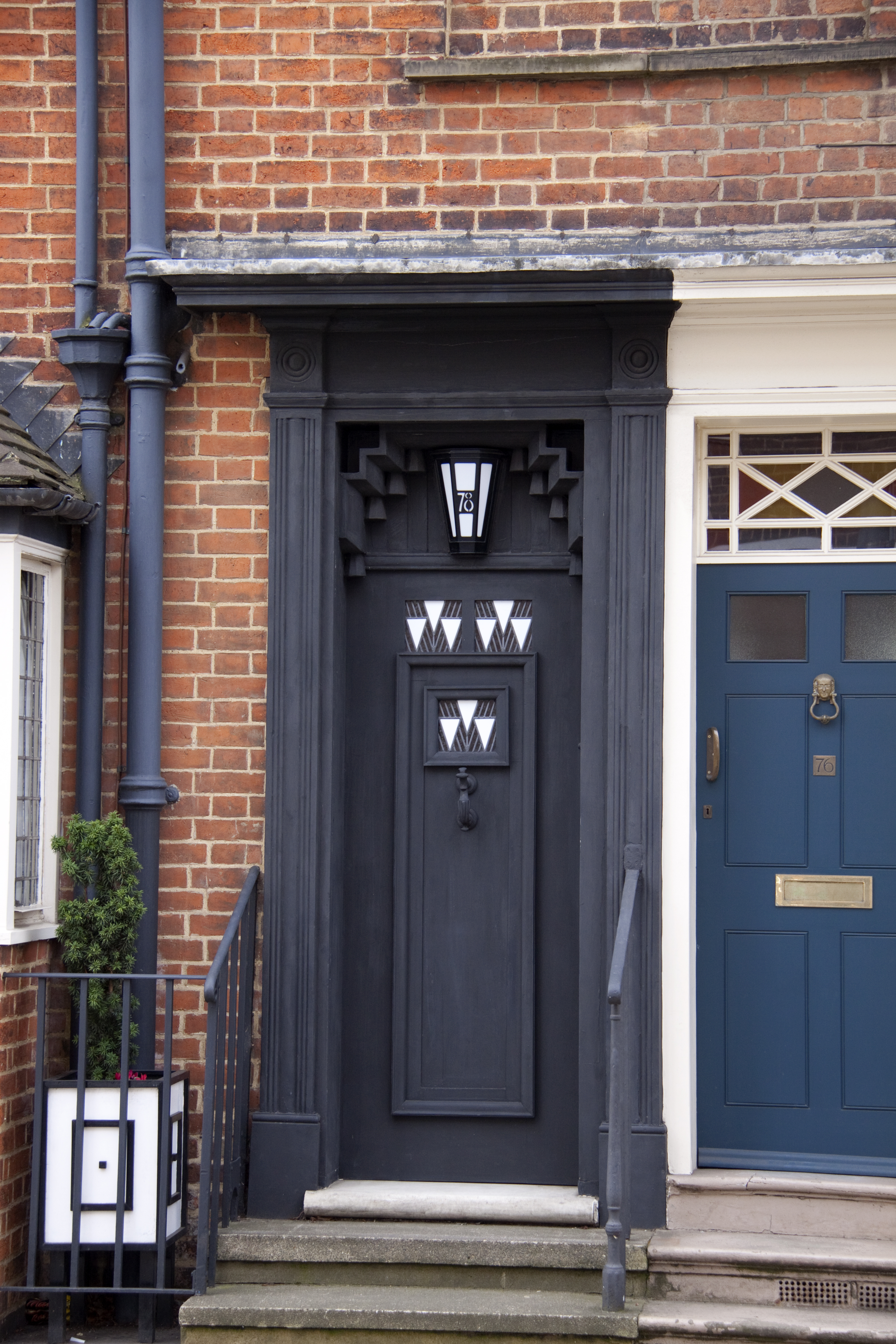
78 Derngate

78 Derngate is a Grade II* Listed Georgian house, noted for its interior, which was extensively redeveloped in 1916-7 by Charles Rennie Mackintosh for local businessman and modelmaker, Wenman Joseph Bassett-Lowke. It has been open to the public since 2003.

== Errol Flynn Filmhouse ==
The Errol Flynn Filmhouse opened in June 2013, named after actor Errol Flynn, who worked at Northampton's Royal Theatre in his early career. The 88-seat venue, in Albion Place, is part of the Royal & Derngate theatre complex. It screens art-house, world films and documentaries alongside some mainstream films. The development was part of the Northampton Alive regeneration project.

== Northampton Museum and Art Gallery ==
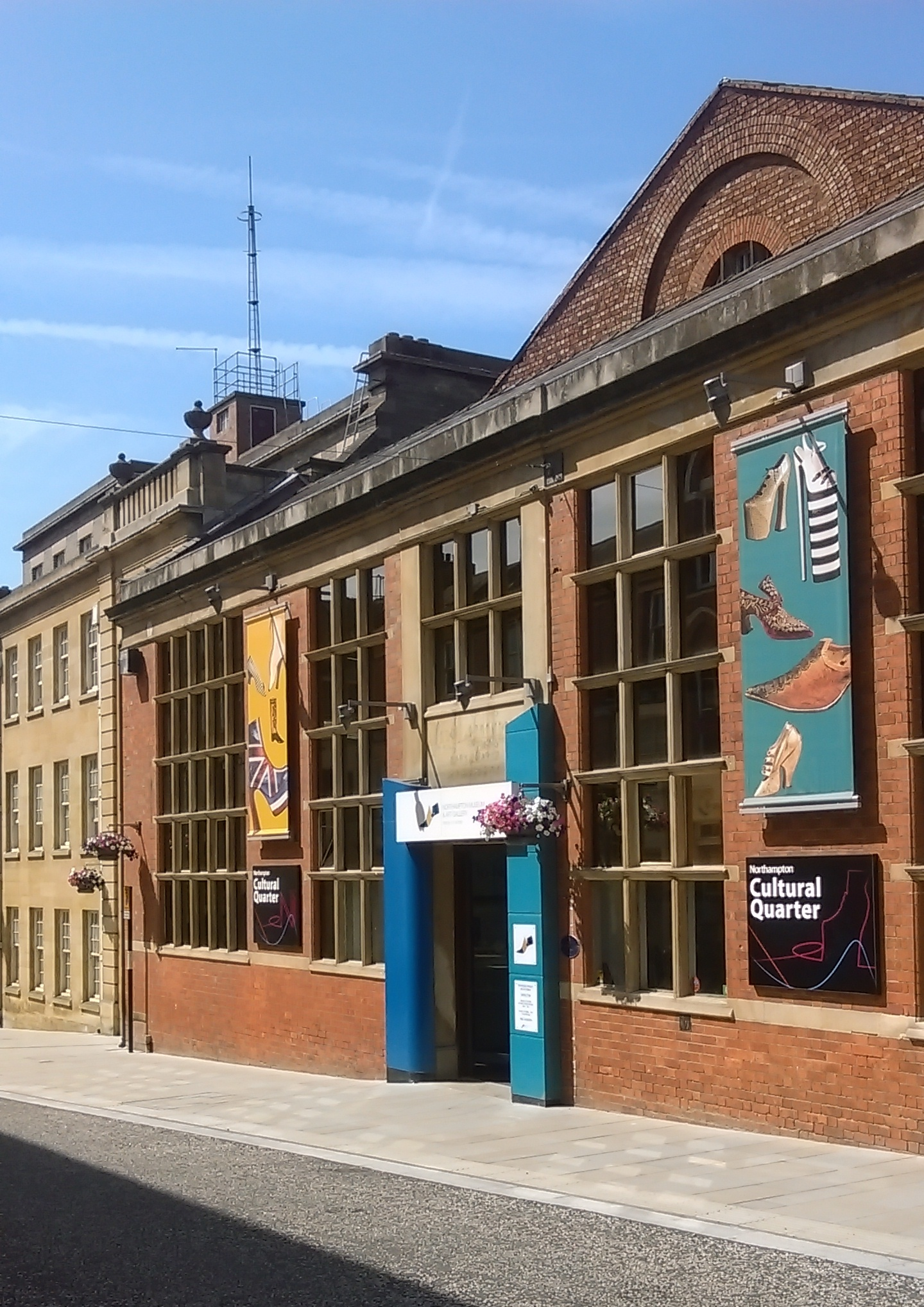
Northampton Museum and Art Gallery

Northampton Museum and Art Gallery dates back to 1884. It was refurbished in 2012.

== NN Contemporary Art ==
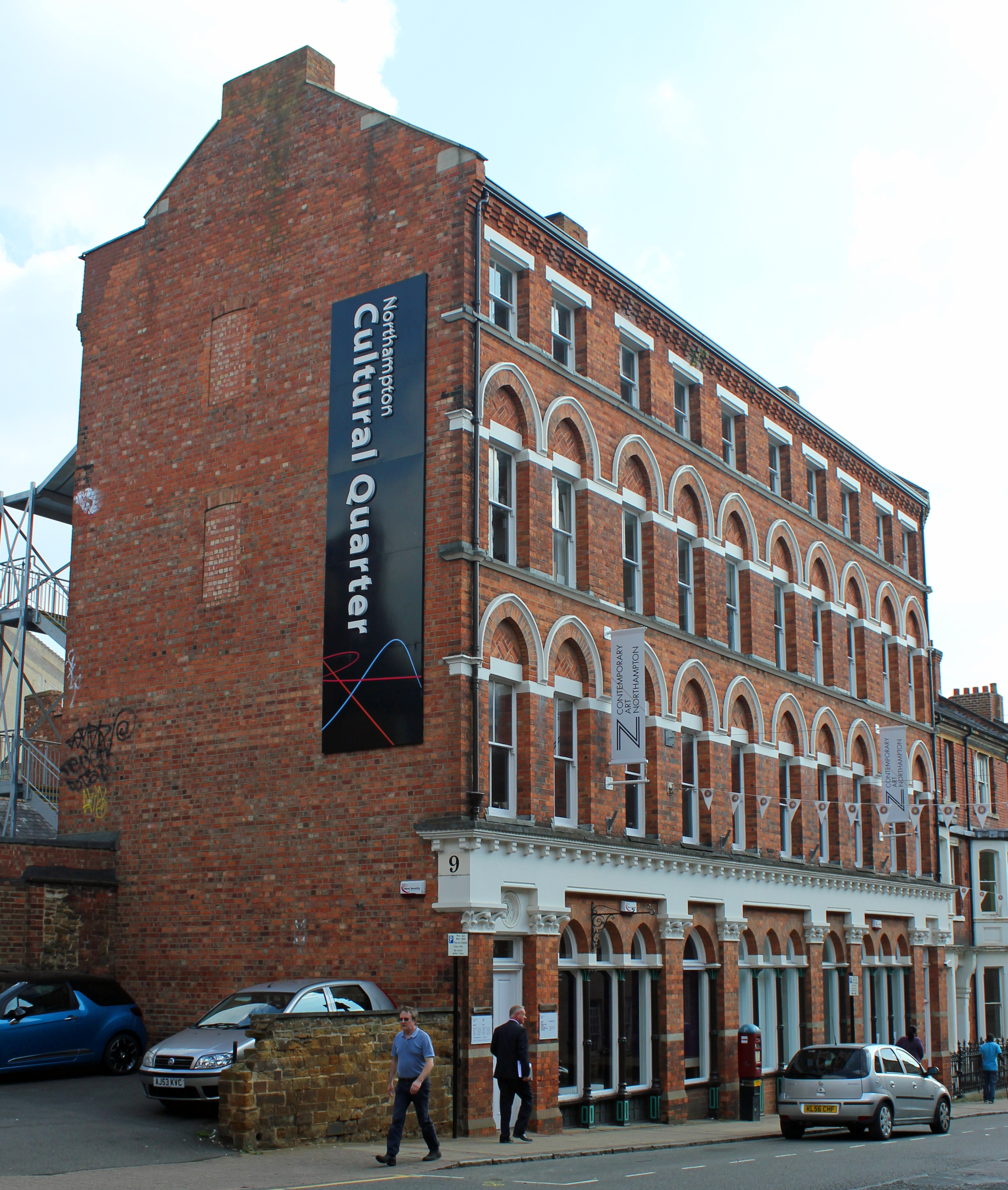
9 Guildhall Road; the building built by Edmund Francis Law originally as a hotel is now home to Performing Room, a music, heritage and well being Charity who moved into 9 Guildhall Road in January 2020.

NN is an independent contemporary art space in the centre of Northampton. The gallery works with artists at all stages of their careers to present an international programme of contemporary art and multi-disciplinary events. The gallery is run by the Northampton Arts Collective, which moved in 2012 from the old Fishmarket, later demolished to make way for a new bus station. NN Cafe, a café and performance venue, opened upstairs in October 2013 and ran until 2016. The Artist Table took on the Cafe space opening in spring 2017. In 2014 NN was awarded charitable status by the charities commission. and was awarded National Portfolio Organisation status by Arts Council England in June 2017 for the period 2018–22.

In 2003 a group of artists and practitioners came together to form Northampton Arts Collective (NAC). The group's first flagship project was Fishmarket, which launched in 2006 as an independently run, not-for-profit visual arts space in the former abandoned Fishmarket building off the market square in central Northampton. This building housed the largest gallery space outside a city in the UK, alongside retail units and café. From 2006–2011 it presented changing exhibitions of contemporary art featuring artists such as Jamie Shovlin, Bill Drummond, and CJ Mahony, and interdisciplinary events including music and spoken word performances by artists such as Alan Moore, Lyric Lounge, and Don Letts.

NAC now forms the board for NN in the new space at Number Nine, which is run by curatorial and operational staff.

The NN Contemporary Art space has now moved into new facilities across the road at 24 Guildhall Road. 9 Guildhall Road is now home to a music, heritage and well being charity called 'Performing Room'. They moved into 9 Guildhall Road in January 2020.

== Royal & Derngate ==
Royal & Derngate is a theatre complex which is formed of the Royal Theatre, a 583-seat producing house, and the Derngate Theatre, a 1,200-set multi-purpose performance space. The Royal opened in 1884, followed 99 years later by the Derngate in 1983, which was built on the site of Northampton's former Derngate bus station. The two theatres merged as one organisation in 1999, closed in 2005 to undergo an 18-month £14.5m redevelopment, and re-opened as Royal & Derngate in 2006. The Stage hailed Royal & Derngate as the Regional Theatre of the Year (2010) in its inaugural Stage 100 Awards for "its artistic quality and connections it has with local audiences."

== Food and drink ==
- V&B – French-inspired beer, wine and cheese bar
- John Franklins
- Haycock and Tailbar Associates
- The Mailcoach
- The Artist Table
- Pizza Express
- The Vineyard
- The Wine Connection

== Hair and fashion ==
- Berties
- Dapper Chaps
- The Guild
- Montague Jeffery
- Outcast
- Salon Forty-Six
- Wedding Wardrobe

== Recent developments ==
St John's Hall of Residences, a block of 462 student flats for the University of Northampton, opened in January 2014. The building is on the site of a former open air car park and prior to that the Northampton St. John's Street railway station, part of the former Bedford to Northampton Line.

A new Premier Inn hotel was built in Albion Place in 2015 and opened in 2016. Two properties adjacent to Royal & Derngate are set to be turned into a hotel and restaurant. Newspaper House on Derngate is expected to be turned into luxury flats.

Several previously industrial buildings will be turned into a 'Vulcan Works'. Work on the project started in 2015 and is expected to be finished in 2017.

A project to construct more headquarters for Northamptonshire County Council started in February 2015. It is expected to be finished in 2016.
