= Good Bones =

1992 collection of short fiction by Margaret Atwood

- First edition (publ. Coach House Books)
- Author: Margaret Atwood
- Audio read by: Barbara Karmazyn
- Language: English
- Genre: Short stories
- Publisher: Coach House Press
- Publication date: 1992
- Publication place: Canada
- Pages: 153
- ISBN: 9780889104310
- OCLC: 28111549
- Second edition, published by Virago, 2010, ISBN 9781844086924

Good Bones is a collection of short fiction (most stories only a few pages long) by Canadian author Margaret Atwood. The collection was originally published in 1992.

The collection explores the sinister side of classical myths, traditional Anglo-European folklore and literary archetypes. Through the stories, Atwood gives voice to the "bad girls": the stupid, ugly or wicked stepmothers and stepsisters who feature as antagonists in the archetypes Atwood explores. For example, the Little Red Hen, the stepsisters from 'Cinderella', and Gertrude from William Shakespeare's Hamlet get their say. Ultimately, these stories explore the danger of life (which inevitably ends in death) and the power of telling one's own story.

The book was republished in 1994, in combination with another Atwood work called Murder in the Dark, as part of the expanded collection Good Bones and Simple Murders.
