= Spring Storm =

1938 play by Tennessee Williams

- Production Poster
- Written by: Tennessee Williams
- Characters: Heavenly Critchfield
- Original language: English
- Genre: Drama
- Setting: Mississippi

Premiere
- Date premiered: 1995
- Place premiered: Berkeley, California

Spring Storm is a three-act play written by American playwright Tennessee Williams. He began writing it when he was twenty-six years old, in 1937, while enrolled in the University of Iowa's drama school, and completed the play the following year. But Williams's playwriting teachers had a negative response to Spring Storm, and it did not receive its first production until 1995 in Berkeley, California. In 2001, the play was produced at Willoughby Fine Arts Association in northeast Ohio, directed by Lenny Pinna. The European premiere took place at the Royal & Derngate Northampton on 15 October 2009, running alongside Beyond the Horizon by Eugene O'Neill. Both productions subsequently transferred to the Royal National Theatre in 2010 to the Cottesloe Theatre. Written and rewritten between 1937 and 1938, this full-length play depicts life and conflicted love in a small Mississippi Delta town during the Great Depression. The Performing Arts Association of Notre Dame Australia (PAANDA) presented Spring Storm in 2018. The play was directed by Courtney McManus and Stage managed by Carmel Mohen.

The play's original title was "April is the Cruelest Month," which was also the opening line from T. S. Eliot's poem "The Waste Land." When Williams presented Spring Storm to his playwriting class in April 1938, he wrote in his diary that the class, "Read the final version of my second act and it was finally, quite, quite finally rejected by the class because of Heavenly's weakness as a character. Of course, it is very frightening and discouraging to work on a thing and then have it fall flat. There is still a chance they may be wrong-- all of them-- I have to cling to that chance...."

== Summary ==
PLACE
Port Tyler, a small Mississippi town on the Mississippi River
TIME
Spring, 1937

Act One:

A high bluff overlooking the Mississippi River on a spring afternoon

Act Two:

Scene 1 — The Critchfield home. Friday afternoon, the same week
Scene 2 — Same, that evening
Scene 3 — Same, three o'clock in the morning

Act Three:

Scene 1 — Lawn of the Lamphrey residence, the next evening, a party in full swing
Scene 2 — The Port Tyler Carnegie Public Library, the same evening
Scene 3 — The Critchfield home, late afternoon of the next day

== Main characters ==
Dick Miles
A man considered of a lower class than the Critchfield family. Plans on leaving Mississippi with Heavenly to find construction work.
Heavenly Critchfield
An upper-class woman with family lineage, but her family has since run out of money. Does not want to leave Mississippi with Dick, although she has lost her virginity to him. Decides to marry Arthur Shannon who does have money, but fails and is left alone.
The stage notes say that, "The important thing about Heavenly is that she is physically attractive. She has the natural and yet highly-developed charm that is characteristic of girls of pure southern stock. She is frankly sensuous without being coarse, fiery-tempered and yet disarmingly sweet. Her nature is confusing to herself and to all who know her. She wears a white skirt and sweater with a bright-colored scarf."
Arthur Shannon
An upper-class man whose family still has money. Went to England for school after being bullied by Dick as a child. Has come back to Mississippi and plans on marrying Heavenly. After having sex with Hertha, he blames himself for her suicide and leaves town.
Dan Isaac, editor of the published copy of Spring Storm, says that, "Williams designed [...] Arthur Shannon, as a Portrait of the Artist as a Young Heterosexual."

== Plot ==
The play opens with the stage directions setting the scenery and state layout, as:

The curtain rises to reveal a high, windy bluff over the Mississippi River. It is called Lover's Leap. On its verge are two old trees whose leafless branches have been grotesquely twisted by the winds. At first the scene has a mellow quality, the sky flooded with deep amber light from the sunset. But as it progresses, it changes to one of stormy violence to form a dramatic contrast between Heavenly's scene and Hertha's. The atmospheric change is caused by the approach of the spring storm which breaks at the scene's culmination.

Heavenly Critchfield and Dick Miles are arguing about Dick's career and their future as a couple. Dick wants to head to the river to find work, but Heavenly wants to stay near home and her family. Arthur Shannon, a childhood acquaintance of Dick and Heavenly returns to town and Heavenly begins to question her decision to stay with Dick.

Mrs. Critchfield and Lila, Heavenly's aunt, are found in the Critchfield home's living room discussing what's happened to the other young women who chose not to marry young or made the wrong decision; they're all lonely and poor now. Mrs. Critchfield wants Heavenly to marry Arthur Shannon for his wealth and family name. While the Critchfields have a strong familial name, they do not have the wealth that the Shannons have.

Arthur comes to the Critchfields' home to have a date with Heavenly. The pair do not see eye to eye and talk around each other as neither have any common interests. After Arthur refuses to sleep with Heavenly, Heavenly runs away to find Dick leaving Mrs. Critchfield to lie to Arthur about Heavenly's whereabouts.

Arthur and Heavenly try to speak to each other in private but are never afforded time alone. The pair gives up, leaving Arthur to tend to an intoxicated Hertha, another local girl of the same age. After causing a scene in the library in front of Miss Schlagmann, who never married, Arthur and Hertha fight, leading to the murder of Hertha.

Heavenly returned home after discovering that Dick left town without her, only to have Arthur come and confess the murder, leaving Heavenly single with no prospects.

== Notes ==
- Williams, Tennessee (1999). Dan Isaac (introduction) (ed.). Spring Storm. New York, NY: New Directions. ISBN 978-0-8112-1422-3.
- http://www.nationaltheatre.org.uk/56151/productions/spring-storm.html
