= Murder in the Dark =

First edition (publ. Coach House Books)

Murder in the Dark is a collection of short fiction by Canadian author Margaret Atwood, published in 1983. Some of the pieces were previously published. The 27 pieces range over a variety of styles, including fictionalized autobiography, parables, travel stories, satires and prose poems. The pieces hold together through their major themes of loss, menace and terror, and men's abuse of power.

The book was republished in 1994, in combination with another Atwood work called Good Bones, as part of the expanded collection Good Bones and Simple Murders.

== Contents ==
- Autobiography
- Raw Materials
- Murder in the Dark

Murder in the Dark refers to a childhood game (also played by adults) in which one person is secretly appointed murderer, another is appointed detective. The detective leaves the room, and in the dark, the murderer "kills" one of the other players, who screams and plays dead. At the sound of the scream, the detective returns to question all the players, in order to determine who is the murderer. All the players must tell the truth, except for the murderer, who must lie. Atwood uses this game to describe the relationship between the author, reader and critic: the writer is the murderer, the critic is the detective, and the reader is the victim.

- Mute
- Making Poison
- Simmering

Simmering is a satire that presents the future as a time when traditional Western gender roles have been reversed: men are housekeepers and women work in offices. Cooking and recipes are status symbols for men, who develop secret societies with handshakes named after culinary dishes. Women suffer kitchen envy, and still dream of freedom.

- She
- The Boys' Own Annual, 1911
- Women's Novels
- Worship
- Before the War
- Happy Endings
- Iconography
- Horror Comics
- Bread
- Liking Men
- Boyfriends
- The Page

This essay explores the significance of the blank page that a writer stares at while waiting for inspiration.

- Strawberries
- The Victory Burlesk
- Him
- Fainting
- Hopeless
- A Parable
- Hand
- Everlasting
- Instructions for the Third Eye

The "third eye" is the eye that sees harsh reality, which most people prefer to leave blind. But the third eye shows the truth. This story is only about a page long and is written as a series of short paragraphs that "instruct" the reader on how to use one's third eye.
