= Margaret Wheeler (midwife) =

British midwife and public servant

Dame Margaret Wheeler DBE FRCOG

President of the Royal College of Midwives
- In office 1987–1994

Personal details
- Born: Margaret Anne Brain; 23 April 1932
- Died: 5 June 2024 (aged 92)
- Education: Northampton High School
- Profession: Midwife
- Awards: CBE (1988); FRCOG (1991); DBE (1994)

Dame Margaret Anne Wheeler, DBE, FRCOG (née Brain; 23 April 1932 – 5 June 2024) was a British midwife and public servant. She served as president of the Royal College of Midwives from 1987 to 1994.

== Biography ==
Wheeler was born on 23 April 1932 to Charles and Leonora Brain. She was educated at Northampton High School, an independent school for girls. She undertook her nursing training at Westminster Hospital, becoming a state registered nurse (SRN) in 1953. She then moved to Northampton and Epsom Hospitals to undertake midwifery training, becoming a State Certified Midwife (SCM) in 1956. Having trained as a nurse and then as a midwife, she was a medical missionary with the United Society Partners in the Gospel in India. On returning to the United Kingdom, she completed the Midwife Teachers' Diploma (MTD) in 1966. Working in hospitals and maternity homes in England and Wales, she ended her career as chief administrative nursing officer of the South Glamorgan Health Authority from 1977 to 1988.

She became a member of the Council of the Royal College of Midwives in 1970, and served as president from 1987 to 1994. She championed keeping midwifery as a dedicated, independent profession, rather than a sub-field of nursing. She held a number of public appointments, such as membership of the Standing Midwifery Committee, Welsh National Board (1982–1987), of the Department of Health's Standing Nursing and Midwifery Advisory Committee (1987–1993), and of the Women's National Commission. She also served as the treasurer of the International Confederation of Midwives from 1978 to 1990.

In 1985, Margaret Brain married Peter Wheeler MBE FRCS FRCOG. He died only three years later, in 1988. She retired that year. In her final years she trained for lay ministry in the Church of England, and she was licensed as a reader in 2001. She died on 5 June 2024, aged 92. Her funeral was held at St James's Church, Exeter.

== Honours ==
In the 1989 New Year Honours, Wheeler was appointed Commander of the Order of the British Empire (CBE) in recognition of her work as chief administrative nursing officer of the South Glamorgan Health Authority. In the 1994 New Year Honours, she was promoted to Dame Commander of the Order of the British Empire (DBE) "for services to midwifery", and thereby granted the title dame.

In 1991, Wheeler was elected Fellow of the Royal College of Obstetricians and Gynaecologists (FRCOG), the first midwife to be so honoured.
