= Beyond the Horizon (play) =

Play by Eugene O'Neill

- First edition cover
- Original language: English
- Written by: Eugene O'Neill
- Characters: Robert Mayo; Andrew Mayo; Ruth Atkins; James Mayo; Kate Mayo; Captain Dick Scott; Mrs. Atkins; Mary; Ben; Doctor Fawcett
- Genre: Tragedy
- Setting: The Mayo farm and the surrounding countryside

Premiere
- Date: 1920
- Place: Broadway

Beyond the Horizon is a play written by American playwright Eugene O'Neill. Although he first copyrighted the text in June 1918, O'Neill continued to revise the play throughout the rehearsals for its 1920 premiere. His first full-length work to be staged, Beyond the Horizon won the 1920 Pulitzer Prize for Drama.

== Productions ==
Beyond the Horizon premiered on Broadway at the Morosco Theatre, from February 3, 1920 to February 20, 1920, transferred to the Criterion Theatre from February 24, 1920 to March 5, 1920, and finally transferred to the Little Theatre, from March 9, 1920 to June 26, 1920. Directed by Homer Saint-Gaudens, the cast featured Erville Alderson (James Mayo), Richard Bennett (Robert Mayo), Robert Kelly (Andrew Mayo), Mary Jeffery (Kate Mayo), and Sidney Macy (Captain Dick Scott).

This production won the 1920 Pulitzer Prize for Drama.

Beyond the Horizon was revived on Broadway at the Mansfield Theatre on November 30, 1926 and closed on February 5, 1927 after 79 performances. Directed by James Light, the cast featured Malcolm Williams (James Mayo), Judith Lowry (Kate Mayo), Albert Tavernier (Captain Dick Scott), Thomas Chalmers (Andrew Mayo), Robert Keith (Robert Mayo), Aline MacMahon (Ruth Atkins), Eleanor Wesselhoeft (Mrs. Atkins), and Elaine Koch (Mary).

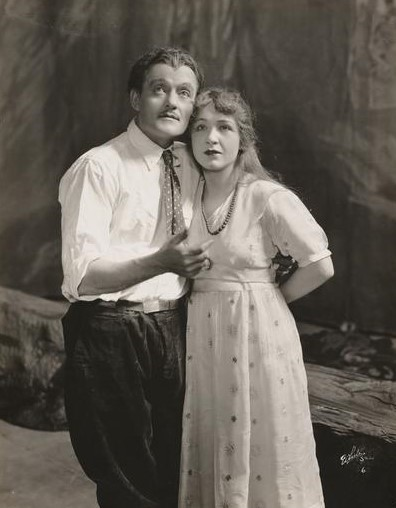
Richard Bennett and Helen MacKellar in the original Broadway production of Beyond the Horizon (1920)

The play was presented by Royal & Derngate in Northampton in November 2009. This production subsequently transferred to London's National Theatre in March 2010.

== Overview ==
The play takes place on a farm in the Spring, and then moves forward three years later, in the Summer, and finally five years later, in late Fall. The play focuses on the portrait of a family, and particularly only two brothers Andrew and Robert. In the first act of the play, Robert is about to go off to sea with their uncle Dick, a sea captain, while Andrew looks forward to marrying his sweetheart Ruth and working on the family farm as he starts a family.

== Characters ==
- James Mayo, a farmer
- Kate Mayo, James Mayo's wife
- Captain Dick Scott, Kate Mayo's brother
- Andrew Mayo, James and Kate Mayo's eldest son
- Robert Mayo, James and Kate Mayo's younger son
- Ruth Atkins, Robert Mayo's wife
- Mrs. Atkins, Ruth Atkins' widowed mother
- Mary, Robert and Ruth's daughter

== Synopsis ==
Act I

Robert Mayo is sitting on the fence line of his family's farm, contemplating the horizon. He has dreamed of leaving the farm and travelling so he wouldn't live in one place. The next morning, Robert will sail with his maternal uncle, Captain Dick Scott, on the Sunda to visit the foreign places he has only dreamed and read about. Robert's elder brother, Andrew, wants to stay on the farm and keep working on it. Andrew is engaged to Ruth Atkins, a woman Robert has been in love with. On the eve of Robert's departure, he confesses his feelings to Ruth and she reveals that she also loves him and had only agreed to marry Andrew out of the mistaken belief Robert doesn't love her back. Robert decides to stay on the farm and marry Ruth.

Upset over losing Ruth to Robert, Andrew hastily chooses to join his uncle. The family patriarch, James Mayo, persuades Andrew to stay. But Andrew still leaves with Captain Scott yet harbors no ill will to Robert.

Act II

Two years after his oldest son left to travel the world, Mr. Mayo dies. When another year passes, life on the Mayo family's farm has deteriorated due to Robert lacking the farming skills his brother has. Robert's mother, Kate Mayo, says Robert cannot help the deterioration, but his mother-in-law, Mrs. Atkins, retorts that all his hard work has yielded nothing. In the three years, Ruth discovers that all that charmed her about her husband no longer holds the same allure and their daughter, Mary, is as irritable and sickly as he was in his own youth. Ruth insists to Robert that she should have seen his "true self" and killed herself before they had married. This revelation embitters Robert and he continues to let the farm deteriorate.

The Mayo family hopes for Andrew's homecoming. Having finished his three-year apprenticeship on the Sunda, Andrew wants to help, but has lost his money on ill-advised land speculation and must travel to Argentina to recoup his losses. He promises to return and restore the farm to its former glory. Ruth pleads with Andrew to stay, but he leaves on the first available ship to South America.

Act III

Five years pass by, and both Mrs. Mayo and Mary have died. The farm has been ruined and Robert himself is seriously ill from tuberculosis. Andrew returns poor again due to illegitimate trading and he brings a doctor to Robert, but the disease has become terminal.

Now a broken man, Robert drags himself to the fence line one last time so he can observe the horizon and imagine the travels he would never experience.

== Adaptations ==
The play was adapted for television and broadcast on PBS Great Performances series in July 1975, directed by Rick Hauser and Michael Kahn. The cast featured Richard Backus (Robert Mayo), Kate Wilkinson (Kate Mayo), John Randolph (James Mayo), Edward J. Moore (Andrew Mayo), Maria Tucci (Ruth Atkins), Geraldine Fitzgerald (Mrs. Atkins), John Houseman (Dr. Fawcett), and James Broderick (Captain Scott). The play was adapted into an opera by composer Nicolas Flagello in 1983.

== Critical response ==
According to the PBS American Experience program, "Theater historians point to O'Neill's Beyond the Horizon, which debuted in 1920, as the first native American tragedy. That play emerged from O'Neill's association with the Provincetown Players, one of many so-called 'little theaters' that developed in the 1910s to provide alternative fare to commercial drama of the time."
