= List of fiction set in Toronto =

A list of fiction set in Toronto, Ontario, Canada, in whole or in part.

== English ==
=== Novels ===
- Lovers and Strangers by Joyce Marshall (1957)
- The Meeting Point by Austin Clarke (1967)
- Cabbagetown by Hugh Garner (1968)
- The Edible Woman by Margaret Atwood (1969)
- Cabbagetown Diary: A Documentary by Juan Butler (1970)
- A Fine and Private Place by Morley Callaghan (1975)
- The Engineer of Human Souls by Josef Škvorecký (1977, Translated 1984)
- Life Before Man by Margaret Atwood (1979)
- The Rebel Angels by Robertson Davies (1981)
- The Martyrology Book 5 by B. P. Nichol (1982)
- The Summer Tree by Guy Gavriel Kay (1984) The Fionavar Tapestry
- Fables of Brunswick Avenue by Katherine Govier (1985)
- What's Bred in the Bone by Robertson Davies (1985)
- The Wandering Fire by Guy Gavriel Kay (1986) The Fionavar Tapestry
- The Darkest Road by Guy Gavriel Kay (1986) The Fionavar Tapestry
- In the Skin of a Lion by Michael Ondaatje (1987)
- Cat's Eye by Margaret Atwood (1988)
- The Lyre of Orpheus by Robertson Davies (1988)
- Born To Lose (novella and stories) by Trevor Clark (author) (1989)
- Killshot by Elmore Leonard (1989)
- A Prayer for Owen Meany by John Irving (1989)
- Barking Dogs by Terence M. Green (1989)
- Losing Joe's Place by Gordon Korman (1990)
- Murther and Walking Spirits by Robertson Davies (1991)
- Blood Price (Vicky Nelson, P.I.) by Tanya Huff (1991)
- No New Land by M. G. Vassanji (1991)
- Blood Trail (Vicky Nelson, P.I.) by Tanya Huff (1992)
- Blood Lines (Vicky Nelson, P.I.) by Tanya Huff (1993)
- Blood Pact (Vicky Nelson, P.I.) by Tanya Huff (1993)
- Headhunter by Timothy Findley (1993)
- The Robber Bride by Margaret Atwood (1993)
- The Innocence of Age by Neil Bissoondath (1993)
- The Cunning Man by Robertson Davies (1994)
- How Insensitive by Russell Smith (1994)
- Deadly by Nature by Meredith Andrew (1995)
- The Terminal Experiment by Robert J. Sawyer (1995)
- Moonlit Days and Nights by D. H. Toole (1995)
- Alias Grace by Margaret Atwood (1996)
- Fugitive Pieces by Anne Michaels (1996)
- To Dance At The Palais Royale by Jane McNaughton (1996)
- Blood Debt (Vicky Nelson, P.I.) by Tanya Huff (1997)
- Blue Limbo by Terence M. Green (1997)
- Buying On Time by Antanas Sileika (1997)
- Where She Has Gone by Nino Ricci (1997)
- "1978" by Daniel Jones (1998)
- Brown Girl in the Ring Nalo Hopkinson (1998)
- Factoring Humanity by Robert J. Sawyer (1998)
- Noise by Russell Smith (1998)
- Flyboy Action Figure Comes With Gasmask by Jim Munroe (1999) ISBN 9780380810437
- A Witness to Life by Terence M. Green (1999)
- Sanctuary & Other Stories by Jennifer Duncan (1999)
- The Rules of Engagement by Catherine Bush (2000)
- The Blind Assassin by Margaret Atwood (2000)
- Calculating God by Robert J. Sawyer (2000) ISBN 0812580354
- Courage My Love by Sarah Dearing (2001)
- Thirsty by Dionne Brand (2001)
- Margery Looks Up by Meredith Andrew (2002)
- Back Flip by Anne Denoon (2002)
- Making a Killing by Warren Dunford (2002)
- The Neanderthal Parallax by Robert J. Sawyer
  - Hominids (2002)
  - Humans (2003)
  - Hybrids (2003)
- Cat's Crossing by Bill Cameron (2003)
- The Double by Philip Quinn (2003)
- Doctor Bloom's Story by Don Cole (2004)
- Death in the Age of Steam by Mel Bradshaw (2004)
- An opening act of unspeakable evil by Jim Munroe (2004) ISBN 9780968636336
- The City Man by Howard Ackler (2005)
- Gently Down the Stream by Ray Robertson (2005)
- What We All Long For by Dionne Brand (2005)
- Someone Comes to Town, Someone Leaves Town by Cory Doctorow (2005)(available online)
- The Secret Mitzvah of Lucio Burke by Steven Hayward (2005)
- Bloodletting & Miraculous Cures by Vincent Lam
- How Happy to Be by Katrina Onstad (2006)
- Consolation by Michael Redhill (2006)
- Blood Bank (Vicky Nelson, P.I.) by Tanya Huff (2008)
- Girls Fall Down by Maggie Helwig (2008)
- Barnacle Love by Anthony de Sa (2008)
- Last Night in Twisted River by John Irving (2009) ISBN 9780307398369
- "The Carnivore" by Mark Sinnett (2009)
- Dragging The River by Trevor Clark (2009)
- Holding Still for as Long as Possible by Zoe Whittall (2009)
- The Incident Report by Martha Baillie (2009)
- The Charlie Salter mysteries by Eric Wright
- The Jane Yeats mystery series by Liz Brady
- Ghosted by Shaughnessy Bishop-Stall (2010)
- Old City Hall by Robert Rotenberg (2010)
- Love On The Killing Floor by Trevor Clark (2010)
- How Should a Person Be? by Sheila Heti (2010)
- Six Metres of Pavement by Farzana Doctor (2011)
- The Guilty Plea by Robert Rotenberg (2011)
- Dawn at the Royal Star by Jeff Sinasac (2011)
- Stray Bullets by Robert Rotenberg (2012)
- Kicking the Sky by Anthony de Sa (2013)
- Stranglehold by Robert Rotenberg (2013)
- The Placebo Effect (Junction Chronicles) by David Rotenberg (2013)
- A Murder of Crows (Junction Chronicles) by David Rotenberg (2013)
- Dream Caster by Najeev Raj Nadarajah (2013)
- The Glass House (Junction Chronicles) by David Rotenberg (2014)
- The Cheese Stealer's Handbook by Shoshaku Jushaku (2014)
- Station Eleven by Emily St. John Mandel (2014)
- Fifteen Dogs by André Alexis (2015)
- The Unquiet Dead by Ausma Zehanat Khan (2015)
- The Society of Experience by Matt Cahill (2015)
- The Hidden Keys by Andre Alexis (2016)
- Ghost Pains by Alan Michael Beau (2016)
- The Language of Secrets by Ausma Zehanat Khan (2016)
- Heart of the City by Robert Rotenberg (2017)
- Among the Ruins by Ausma Zehanat Khan (2017)
- A Death in Sarajevo by Ausma Zehanat Khan (2017)
- Bellevue Square by Michael Redhill (2017)
- Scarborough by Catherine Hernandez (2017)
- A Dangerous Crossing by Ausma Zehanat Khan (2018)
- The Grimoire of Kensington Market by Lauren B. Davis (2018)
- Ayesha At Last by Uzma Jalaluddin (2018)
- "By The Next Pause" by G. Barton-Sinkia (2018)
- One and Only by Jenny Holiday (2018)
- Not Another Family Wedding by Jackie Lau (2018) Chin-Williams Series
- The Testaments by Margaret Atwood (2019)
- The Chai Factor by Farah Heron (2019)
- A Deadly Divide by Ausma Zehanat Khan (2019)
- The Diamond Queen of Singapore by Ian Hamilton (2020) The Ava Lee Series
- The Stand-In by Lily Chu (2021)
- Hana Khan Carries On by Uzma Jalaluddin (2021)
- The Bank Street Peeper by Erma Odrach (2021)
- Knives and Knightsticks by K. Lew & C.R. Lockhart (2021)
- Every Summer After by Carley Fortune (2022)
- Sophie Go's Lonely Hearts Club by Roselle Lim (2022)
- Blood Like Magic by Liselle Sambury (2022)
- Blood Like Fate by Liselle Sambury (2022)
- Chaos Calling by E. M. Williams (2022) The Xenthian Cycle
- The Comeback by Lily Chu (2023)
- Jane & Edward by Melodie Edwards (2023)
- Meet Me at the Lake by Carley Fortune (2023)
- Really Good, Actually by Monica Heisey (2023)
- Much Ado About Nada by Uzma Jalaluddin (2023)
- Denison Avenue by Christina Wong and Daniel Innes (2023)
- Cold by Drew Hayden Taylor (2024)
- Moonlight Murder - A Detective Aunty Novel by Uzma Jalaluddin (2026)
- The Minute Givers by Christine Smonk (2027)

=== Graphic novels ===
- Jellaby: Monster in the City by Kean Soo (2009)
- Scott Pilgrim by Bryan Lee O'Malley (2004–2010)
- Skim by Mariko Tamaki (2008)

=== Short stories ===
- Toronto Short Stories by Morris Wolfe and Douglas Daymond (1977)
- Streets of Attitude: Toronto Stories by Cary Fagan and Robert MacDonald (1990)
- "People One Knows: Toronto Stories" by Daniel Jones (1994)
- This Ain't No Healing Town by Barry Callaghan (1995)
- Canada Geese and Apple Chatney by Sasenarine Persaud (1998)
- Concrete Forest by Hal Niedzviecki (1998)
- Natasha and Other Stories by David Bezmozgis (2004)
- Stone Mattress by Margaret Atwood (2014)
- Immigrant City by David Bezmozgis (2019)
- Frying Plantain by Zalika Reid-Benta (2019)
- The Vinyl Cafe series by Stuart McLean
  - 1995 – Stories from the Vinyl Cafe
  - 1996 – When We Were Young: A Collection of Canadian Stories
  - 1998 – Home from the Vinyl Cafe
  - 2001 – Vinyl Cafe Unplugged
  - 2003 – Vinyl Cafe Diaries
  - 2005 – Stories from the Vinyl Cafe 10th Anniversary Edition
  - 2006 – Secrets from the Vinyl Cafe
  - 2006 – Dave Cooks the Turkey
  - 2009 – Extreme Vinyl Café
  - 2010 – The Vinyl Cafe Notebooks
  - 2012 – Revenge of The Vinyl Cafe
  - 2013 – Time Now For The Vinyl Cafe Story Exchange
  - 2015 – Vinyl Cafe Turns the Page

=== TV series ===
- Airwaves
- Alias Grace
- The Arrow
- The Associates
- Being Erica
- Billable Hours
- Bitten
- Blood Ties
- Bloodletting & Miraculous Cures
- Blue Murder
- The Border
- Captain Flamingo
- The City
- Connor Undercover
- Cracked
- Da Kink in My Hair
- Degrassi, including:
  - The Kids of Degrassi Street
  - Degrassi Junior High
  - Degrassi High
  - Degrassi: The Next Generation
  - Degrassi: Next Class
- The Detail
- Diamonds
- Dino Dan
- Dino Dana
- Drop the Beat
- E.N.G.
- Flashpoint
- Forever Knight
- Frankie Drake Mysteries
- The Great Detective
- Hangin' In, 1981–1987
- The Indian Detective
- King
- Kim's Convenience
- King of Kensington, 1975–1980
- Kenny vs. Spenny
- Life With Derek
- Liberty Street
- The Line
- The Listener
- Mary Kills People
- Material World
- Metropia
- Murdoch Mysteries
- The Next Step
- The Newsroom
- Nirvanna the Band the Show
- Once a Thief
- Orphan Black
- Our Hero
- Private Eyes
- Pure Pwnage
- Ransom
- Really Me
- ReGenesis
- Remedy
- Riverdale
- Rookie Blue
- Saving Hope
- Secret Millionaires Club
- Seeing Things
- Side Effects
- Straight Up
- Street Legal
- This Is Wonderland
- Total Drama Island
- Traders
- Train 48
- Twitch City
- Wojeck
- Workin' Moms
- The Zack Files

=== Film ===
- The Adjuster (1991)
- Ararat (2002)
- The Art of Woo (2001)
- Blood and Donuts (1995)
- Bon Cop, Bad Cop (2006)
- Breakfast with Scot (2007)
- Calendar (1993)
- Camilla(1994)
- Canadian Bacon (1995)
- Childstar (2004)
- Chloe (2009)
- Circle of Two (1981)
- Citizen Gangster (2011)
- Crash (1996)
- Dead Ringers (1988)
- Deadly Eyes (1982)
- Down the Road Again (2011)
- Dr. Cabbie (2014)
- Driven (2001)
- Enemy (2013)
- Every Day (2018)
- Exotica (1994)
- The F Word (2013)
- Foolproof (2003)
- Goin' Down the Road (1970)
- Going the Distance (2004)
- H (1990)
- Highpoint (1982)
- Hollywood North (2003)
- How She Move (2007)
- The Hurricane (1999)
- I've Heard the Mermaids Singing (1987)
- Ivory Tower (2010)
- Khaled (2001)
- The Kidnapping of the President (1980)
- Last Night (1998)
- Let's All Hate Toronto (2007)
- The Love Guru (2008)
- Monkey Warfare (2006)
- My Life Without Me (2003)
- Picture Day (2012)
- One Week (2008)
- Owning Mahowny (2003)
- Scott Pilgrim vs. the World (2010)
- The Silent Partner (1978)
- Sugar (2004)
- Take This Waltz (2011)
- This Movie Is Broken (2010)
- The Uncles (2000)
- Toronto Stories (2008)
- Turning Red (2022)
- Videodrome (1983)
- When Night Is Falling (1995)

=== Overviews ===
- Greg Gatenby's Toronto: A Literary Guide (McArthur, 1999) provides an encyclopaedic literary tour of Toronto places.
- Robert Fulford’s lecture from 1996 called: "The Invention of Toronto".
- Amy Lavender Harris' Imagining Toronto (Mansfield, 2010), a comprehensive study of literary representations of Toronto.

=== Videogames ===
- Xenosaga Episode III (2006)

== French ==
=== Novels ===
- Du vieux vin dans des bouteilles neuves by Frederick J. A. Davidson (1926)
- Ainsi parle la tour CN by Hédi Bouraoui (1999)
- Toronto, je t’aime by Didier Leclair (2000)
- Ce pays qui est le mien by Didier Leclair (2003)
- 69, rue de la Luxure by Paul-François Sylvestre (2004)
- Déclic à Toronto by Mireille Messier (2004)
- La première guerre de Toronto by Daniel Marchildon (2010)
- Toronto (érotique gay) by Bravery (2012)
- Tila à Toronto by Jean-Baptiste Mubalutila Mbizi (2013)
- Les dragouilles T.16 : Les bleues de Toronto by Karine Gottot (2016)
- À bientôt, Toronto ! by Louis Laforce (2021)
- Welsford by Claude Guilmain (2023)

== Chinese ==
=== Novels ===
- Sun Bo (孙博)，《男人三十》 (Nanren sanshi) (Men in 30s)。北京：文化艺术，2000. ISBN 9787503919350
- Yu Xi 余曦，《安大略湖畔》 (Andalue hupan) (The Shores of Lake Ontario)。北京：作家，2005. ISBN 9787506331623
- Zhang Ling 张翎，《邮购新娘》(Dougou xinniang) (Mail order wife) 北京：作家，2004. ISBN 9787506328180

=== Short stories ===
- Zhang Ling 张翎，《雁过澡溪》(Yan guo zaoxi) (四川成都：成都时代，2006.
- Zhang Ling 张翎，《盲约》(Mang yue)。广东广州：花城，2005. ISBN 9787536043923
- Zhang Ling 张翎，《尘世》(Chen shi) (The world of flesh)。广西南宁：广西人民，2004. ISBN 9787219050132

== Hindi ==
=== Films ===
- Bollywood/Hollywood. Deepa Mehta, 2002.
- Kismat Konnection. Aziz Mirza, 2008.

== Tamil ==
=== Films ===
- Arasangam (2008)
