= 8 A.M. =

8 A.M. or variants may refer to:

- A time on the 12-hour clock
- 8AM, a 2017 album by Teengirl Fantasy
- "8AM" (song), a 2009 single by Coldrain
- 8 A.M. Metro, a 2023 Indian film
- "8:00 A.M." (The Pitt season 1), episode 2 from season 1 of The Pitt
- "8:00 A.M." (The Pitt season 2), episode 2 from season 2 of The Pitt

== See also ==
- 8 Air Maintenance Squadron (8 AMS), a Royal Canadian Air Force unit
