= Wayne Rostad =

Canadian singer-songwriter

Wayne Rostad CM
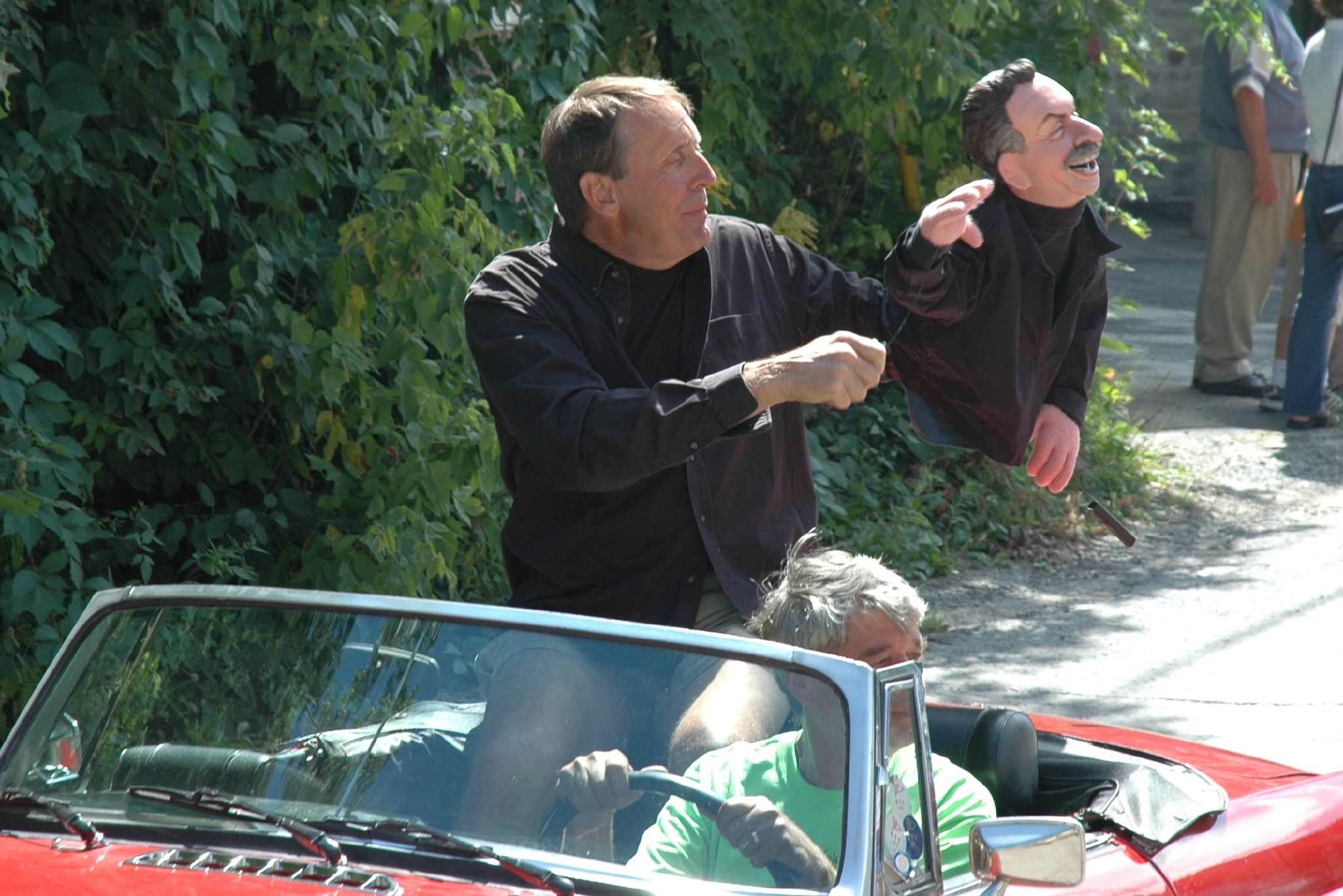
- Rostad appearing at Almonte Puppet Festival, 2006

Background information
- Born: October 28, 1947 (age 78); Ottawa, Ontario, Canada
- Genres: Country
- Occupations: Musician, television presenter

Wayne Victor Rostad CM (born October 28, 1947, in Ottawa, Ontario) is a Canadian musician and television presenter.

== Career ==
In 1969, he became a radio host for CJET in Smiths Falls. After this, he worked at CKWS-TV in Kingston, CKBY radio in Ottawa, and CJCN radio in Grand Falls, Newfoundland. He moved from broadcasting to music in the 1970s, earning a Juno Award nomination in 1981 and recording several albums to date. Rostad returned to broadcasting in the 1980s, leading to his most prominent work as host of CBC Television's On the Road Again. During the program's run from 1987 to 2007, he interviewed ordinary people throughout Canada. Rostad also participates in various charitable events such as telethons for the Children's Hospital of Eastern Ontario and the University of Ottawa Heart Institute, among others. He founded the Gatineau Clog Music Festival which took place at Tucker Lake in Low, Quebec. Rostad also served as a Canadian Forces Honorary Colonel for the 8 Air Maintenance Squadron.

== Personal life ==
Rostad currently lives in Ottawa, Ontario. He has one son, Josh, from a previous marriage.

== Awards and recognition ==
- 1981: nominee, Juno Award for Country Male Vocalist of the Year
- 1988: nominee, Gemini Award for Best Performance by a Host, Interviewer or Anchor (Out Our Way)
- 1990: nominee, Gemini Award for Best Performance by a Host, Interviewer or Anchor (On the Road Again)
- 1992: nominee, Gemini Award for Best Host in a Light Information, Variety or Performing Arts Program or Series (On the Road Again)
- 1994: nominee, Gemini Award for Best Host in a Lifestyle Information, Variety or Performing Arts Program or Series (On the Road Again)
- 1995: nominee, Gemini Award for Best Host in a Lifestyle Information, Variety or Performing Arts Program or Series (On the Road Again)
- 1996: nominee, Gemini Award for Best Host in a Lifestyle Information, Variety or Performing Arts Program or Series (On the Road Again)
- 1999: nominee, Gemini Award for Best Host in a Lifestyle or Performing Arts Program or Series (On the Road Again)
- 2000: nominee, Gemini Award for Best Host in a Lifestyle or Performing Arts Program or Series (On the Road Again)
- 2002: Inducted into the Ottawa Valley Country Music Hall of Fame
- 2003: appointed Member of the Order of Canada
- 2010: inducted into the Canadian Country Music Hall of Fame

== Discography ==
=== Albums ===
Year	Album	CAN Country
1979	Writer of Songs	14
1984	Wayne Rostad Again	—
1991	Storyteller	—

=== Singles ===
Year	Single	Chart Positions		Album
Year	Single	CAN Country	CAN AC	Album
1972	"November Rain"	26	22	single only
1979	"Willie Boy"	9	24	Writer of Songs
1980	"Rideau Street Queen"	20	—	Writer of Songs
1981	"King of Fools"	5	—	Wayne Rostad Again
1983	"Summer Rose"	36	—	Wayne Rostad Again
1983	"Again"	45	—	Wayne Rostad Again
1991	"Schubenacadie Tinsmith Man"	17	—	Storyteller
