= Vinyl Cafe Family Pack =

Live album by Stuart McLean
- Released: 27 September 2011
- Recorded: Canada
- Genre: Spoken word, humour
- Length: 310:19
- Label: Vinyl Cafe Productions

Stuart McLean chronology
Out and About	Vinyl Cafe Family Pack

The Vinyl Cafe Family Pack (2011) is a 4-CD album by Stuart McLean released by Vinyl Cafe Productions.

This is a collection of some of the most requested "Dave and Morley Stories", featuring the family at the centre of the popular CBC Radio show, The Vinyl Cafe.

== Track listing ==
Disc 1 - Dave

1. "Dave goes to the Dentist" - 20:26
2. "Odd Jobs" - 18:14
3. "Dave and the Bike" - 15:18
4. "Dave Cooks the Turkey" - 26:02

Disc 2 - Morley

1. "Holland" - 18:22
2. "The Hairdresser" - 20:15
3. "Labour Pains" - 18:25
4. "Morley"s Book Club" - 19:56

Disc 3 - The Kids

1. "The Waterslide" - 22:35
2. "Tree Planting" - 17:52
3. "Sam the Athlete" - 20:19
4. "Dream Bunnies" - 19:09

Disc 4 - The Pets

1. "Cat in the Car" - 18:12
2. "Arthur the Dog" - 14:33
3. "Dave and the Duck" - 20:00
4. "Toilet Training the Cat" - 20:41

== See also ==
- Stuart McLean
- The Vinyl Cafe
- List of Dave and Morley stories
