= Uzma Jalaluddin =

Canadian writer

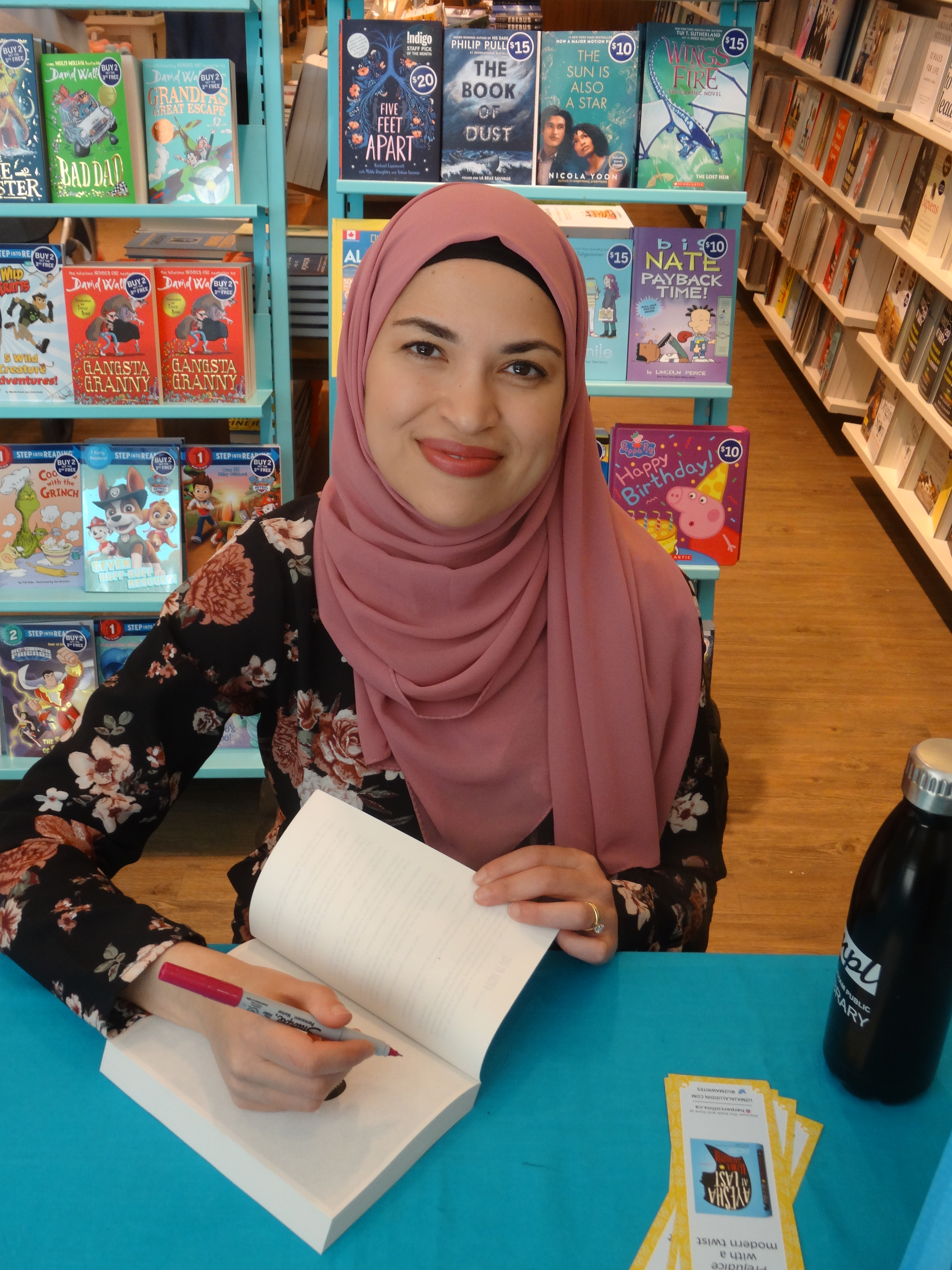
- Uzma Jalaluddin signing her novel, Ayesha At Last
- Born: 1980 (age 45–46)
- Occupations: Writer, teacher

Uzma Jalaluddin (ooz-MA Jah-LA-loo-deen) is a Canadian writer and teacher, known for her 2018 debut novel Ayesha At Last. She writes novels in the mystery and romance genres.

== Career ==
Jalaluddin writes a column for the Toronto Star. In 2017 Jalaluddin was one of several women the Toronto Star interviewed for their opinions on the future of feminism.

She is part of a writing circle with Ausma Zehanat Khan and S.K. Ali. She is also a high school teacher.

=== Novels ===
==== Ayesha At Last ====
Jalaluddin began writing her debut novel Ayesha At Last when she was pregnant with her son Ibrahim, but only decided to finish it when he was seven years old.

Published in 2018, Ayesha At Last was longlisted for the Toronto Book Awards, shortlisted for the 2019 Kobo Emerging Writer Prize, and longlisted for the Stephen Leacock Humour Award. It won a Hearst UK Big Book Award selected by Atlantic Books. The novel has been favourably compared with Jane Austen's Pride and Prejudice.

The film rights to Ayesha At Last were acquired by Amy Pascal's production company Pascal Pictures in August 2018.

==== Other novels ====
Jalaluddin's second novel, Hana Khan Carries On, was published in June 2021. The novel is about a rivalry between two competing halal restaurants. Her subsequent romance titles have included both Much Ado About Nada and Three Holidays and a Wedding (co-written with Marissa Stapley) in 2023. In 2025 she released Yours For the Season.

In May 2025, Jalaluddin branched into the mystery genre with Detective Aunty, following South Asian Muslim sleuth Kausar Khan as she solves a murder in which her daughter is considered the prime suspect. This was followed in 2026 by the sequel Moonlight Murder, in which Khan aims to solve another murder case in the fictional Golden Crescent neighbourhood of Toronto.

== Works ==
Standalone

- Ayesha At Last (2018)
- Hana Khan Carries On (2021)
- Much Ado About Nada (2023)
- Three Holidays and a Wedding (2023)
- Yours For the Season (2025)
- Dina Gets Lucky (2026)

Detective Aunty series

- Detective Aunty (2025)
- Moonlight Murder (2026)

== Awards and reception ==
- 2019 - New York Public Library Best Books for Adults 2019 – Ayesha at Last
