= Reid Jamieson =

Canadian singer-songwriter (born 1973)

- Born: Reid Allan Jamieson; October 20, 1973 (age 52); Toronto, Ontario, Canada
- Genres: Singer-songwriter, Indie rock, folk rock, pop
- Occupations: Singer-songwriter, multi-instrumentalist
- Instruments: Voice, guitar, ukulele, harmonica
- Years active: 1995–present
- Website: reidjamieson.com

Reid Jamieson (born October 20, 1973) is a Canadian singer-songwriter. He was a regular member of the CBC's The Vinyl Cafe and won the grand prize for Folk in the John Lennon Songwriting Contest for the song RAIL.

== Career ==
Jamieson has released thirteen albums and releases singles on a regular basis.

2004's The Unavoidable Truth was produced by Josh Finlayson and features guest appearances from Sarah Harmer, Mia Sheard, Peter Elkas, John Southworth and Bob Egan (Blue Rodeo, Wilco).

In 2006, Jamieson became a member of the CBC's The Vinyl Cafe Orchestra and has toured and recorded with them, as well as appearing on broadcasts shows. Reid's original artwork 'Radio Canada' was used on the posthumous CD box set 'The Unreleased Stories'

In October 2009, Jamieson released a stripped-down version of 6 songs on an EP titled Courting Juniper produced by Byron Kent Wong.

In September 2010, Jamieson released a 14 track all-original album titled Staring Contest. The album features Samantha Parton (Be Good Tanyas), Anne Lindsay (Blue Rodeo) on violin, and fellow Vinyl Cafe band-mate John Sheard on piano. The final version of Staring Contest (remastered) was released in May 2011 with 11 tracks.

In 2012, in preparation for a Vinyl Cafe Christmas tour, Reid released a collection of winter-themed songs titled Songs for a Winter's Night.

Reid recorded and performed the song "Take Heart (Elbow Room) on the Cowboy Junkies present The Kennedy Suite. He performed the song live with Margo Timmins at the release at The Winter Garden Theatre in Toronto in November 2013. The album was longlisted for the Polaris Prize.

In the fall of 2014 Reid released his first record with his wife Carolyn Victoria Mill titled Juniper's Kitchen.

In 2015 Reid released The Presley Sessions Revisited, a follow-up to his 50s era tribute including songs made popular by Elvis Presley, Roy Orbison, The Platters and The Flamingos.

In 2016 Reid released a tribute to Leonard Cohen titled Dear Leonard: The Cohen Collection. & covers plus an original, the title track, open letter to the man himself.

in 2018 Reid and Carolyn went to Ireland to record a new all original record with producer Kieran Kennedy (Maria Doyle Kennedy, Hothouse Flowers), who was introduced to them by fellow Canadian Mary Margaret O'Hara. Released in March 2019, the new record titled 'Me Daza' features the posthumous vocals of late Irish singer songwriter Fergus O'Farrell (Interference).

in 2020 Reid released an intimate tribune to John Lennon to mark what would have been his 80th birthday and the 40th anniversary of his murder. The album includes 7 solo John Lennon songs, 1 by The Beatles, and a cover of Empty Garden by Elton John.

In February 2023 Reid began releasing a couple of singles from his upcoming tribute to Buffy Sainte-Marie 'Summer Boy' and 'Fallen Angels'. This will be the world's first ever full tribute album to this indigenous icon. Due for release February 2024.

In September 2023 Reid's wife and songwriting partner created a lo-fi folk opera called 'The Pigeon & The Dove: A History of Hatred & Love' about pigeons and causes of housing insecurity. Written and directed by CVM, the music was created with Reid, and premiered at the Vancouver Fringe Festival winning them the 'STIR Social Impact Award'.

== Personal life ==
Jamieson performs regularly with his wife and long-time songwriting partner Carolyn Victoria Mill aka CVM. They have been together since February 2002 and had their first kiss on stage during a Valentine's Day benefit at The Rivoli in Toronto. They married in 2010 and currentlylive in the west end of Vancouver BC.

Jamieson suffers from episodic cluster headaches.

== Discography ==
- BUFFY: the Songs of Buffy Sainte-Marie (2024)
- Trouble Sleeping (2021)
- Songs of 69 (2021)
- JOHN 20:20 (2020)
- Me Daza (2019)
- Dear Leonard: The Cohen Collection (2016)
- The Presley Sessions Revisited (2015)
- Juniper's Kitchen (2014) featuring Carolyn Victoria Mill
- Songs for a Winter's Night (2012)
- Staring Contest (final version) (2011)
- Staring Contest (pre-release) (2010)
- Courting Juniper EP (2009)
- The Presley Sessions (2007)
- The Unavoidable Truth (2004)
- The Noise in My Chest EP (2003)
- Cowlick Bravado (2001)

Jamieson also appears on

- The Cowboy Junkies present The Kennedy Suite – 2013
- Howie James – Don't Be Ashamed – 2008
- Tucksy – The EP 2008
- Theresa Sokyrka – Wrapped in Ribbon
- The Swallows – The Beauty of Our Surroundings – 2002
- Lewis Melville- 60 Second Songs – 2002
- Pop Shop – Alvy – (2000)
- Alvy – Alvy – (1996)
