= Vinyl Cafe Odd Jobs =

Live album by Stuart McLean
- Released: 2001
- Recorded: Canada
- Genre: Spoken word, humour
- Length: 148:22
- Label: Vinyl Cafe Productions
- Producer: David Amer, with the exception of the Burgessville concert, which was produced by Eitan Cornfield

Stuart McLean chronology
The Vinyl Cafe On Tour	Vinyl Cafe Odd Jobs	Vinyl Cafe Inc. Coast to Coast Story Service

Vinyl Cafe Odd Jobs (2001) is a two-CD album by Stuart McLean released by Vinyl Cafe Productions.

This collection of stories was taken from CBC Radio concerts that were recorded in Burgessville, Lindsay, Markham, and Toronto in Ontario; in Sherwood Park, Alberta; and in Vancouver, British Columbia.

It was recorded in concert for the CBC Radio show The Vinyl Cafe.

== Track listing ==
1. "Toilet Training The Cat" - 20:54
2. "Music Lessons" - 16:04
3. "Arthur the Dog" - 14:34
4. "Love Never Ends" - 22:30
5. "Odd Jobs" - 18:20
6. "The Fig Tree" - 17:35
7. "No Tax on Truffles" - 22:08
8. "The Bare Truth" - 16:25

== See also ==
- Stuart McLean
- The Vinyl Cafe
- List of Dave and Morley stories
