= Vinyl Cafe Inc. Coast to Coast Story Service =

Live album by Stuart McLean
- Released: 2002
- Recorded: Canada
- Genre: Spoken word, humour
- Length: 143:04
- Label: Vinyl Cafe Productions
- Producer: Dave Amer

Stuart McLean chronology
Vinyl Cafe Odd Jobs	Vinyl Cafe Inc. Coast to Coast Story Service	A Story-Gram From Vinyl Cafe Inc.

Vinyl Cafe Inc. Coast to Coast Story Service (2002) is a two-CD album by Stuart McLean released by Vinyl Cafe Productions.

This collection of stories was taken from CBC Radio concerts that were recorded in Banff, Calgary, Toronto, Kingston, and Outremont.

Recorded in concert for the CBC Radio show The Vinyl Cafe.

== Track listing ==
Disc 1

1. "Dave Goes Babysitting" - 24:33
2. "Morley's Birthday Bash" - 23:34
3. "Dave Gives A Speech" - 24:36

Disc 2

1. "Kenny Wong's Practical Jokes" - 26:49
2. "Dave's Wedding Ring" - 20:13
3. "Christmas With Rasheeda And Ahmeer" - 23:19

== See also ==
- Stuart McLean
- The Vinyl Cafe
- List of Dave and Morley stories
