= The Vinyl Cafe On Tour =

Live album by Stuart McLean
- Released: 1999
- Recorded: Canada
- Genre: Spoken word, humour
- Length: 144:36
- Label: Vinyl Cafe Productions
- Producer: David Amer

Stuart McLean chronology
Vinyl Cafe Stories	The Vinyl Cafe On Tour	Vinyl Cafe Odd Jobs

The Vinyl Cafe On Tour (1999) is a two-CD album by Stuart McLean released by Vinyl Cafe Productions.

This collection of stories was taken from CBC Radio concerts that were taped in St. John's, Halifax, Guelph, Calgary, and Victoria.

Recorded in concert for the CBC Radio show The Vinyl Cafe.

== Track listing ==
Disc 1

1. "Late Date" - 13:26
2. "Morley's Christmas Concert" - 23:53
3. "School Lunch" - 16:00
4. "The Fly" - 19:04

Disc 2

1. "Harrison Ford's Toes" – 22:45
2. "Blood Pressure Chair" – 15:21
3. "Sam's Birthday" – 17:35
4. "Cousin Dorothy" – 16:32

== See also ==
- Stuart McLean
- The Vinyl Cafe
- List of Dave and Morley stories
