= Muslim Girl =

Publication

- Editor in Chief: Ausma Khan
- Categories: Lifestyle, Religious
- Publisher: ExecuGo Media
- Founded: 2007
- First issue: January 2007
- Country: Toronto, Canada

Muslim Girl Magazine was a bi-monthly fashion, beauty, and lifestyle publication marketed for young Muslim women. The magazine was first published in January 2007. It was published by Toronto's ExecuGo Media, and offered style advice, articles on movies and music and general advice, but with a grounding in Islamic issues and with features on Muslim personalities, countries, and cultures. The headquarters was in Toronto, though the magazine's reach was international during its two years of publishing.

The magazine's contributors included writers and journalists Mona Eltahawy, Melody Moezzi, Naheed Mustafa, Salamah Sulaiman, and many more. Ausma Khan was the editor in chief.

== See also ==
- Women in Islam
