= The Morningside World of Stuart McLean =

Collection of radio essays

- Author: Stuart McLean
- Illustrator: Wesley Bates
- Language: English
- Genre: Nonfiction
- Publisher: Viking by Penguin Books Canada Limited
- Publication date: 1989
- Publication place: Canada
- Media type: Print (hardback & paperback)
- Pages: 236 pp
- ISBN: 0-670-82966-8 (hardcover), 0140126082 (paperback)
- Followed by: Welcome Home: Travels in Smalltown Canada

The Morningside World of Stuart McLean (1989) is a collection of radio essays that first aired on CBC Radio's national weekday morning show "Morningside" hosted by Peter Gzowski. In the 1980s Stuart McLean appeared as a regular contributor and occasional host on the show and his slice-of-life storytelling charmed listeners across the country. The book became a Canadian bestseller.

== See also ==
- Stuart McLean
- Morningside
