= A Story-Gram from Vinyl Cafe Inc. =

A Story-Gram From Vinyl Cafe Inc.

Live album by Stuart McLean
- Released: 2004
- Recorded: Canada
- Genre: Spoken word, humour
- Length: 140:30
- Label: Vinyl Cafe Productions

Stuart McLean chronology
Vinyl Cafe Inc. Coast to Coast Story Service (2002)	A Story-Gram From Vinyl Cafe Inc. (2004)

A Story-Gram From Vinyl Cafe Inc. (2004) is a two-CD album by Stuart McLean released by Vinyl Cafe Productions.

McLean's The Vinyl Cafe is CBC Radio program telling about the fictional escapades of Dave, an eccentric owner of a small record store called The Vinyl Cafe, which lends Stuart music for his show. Dave tells Stuart stories about his life, friends, and family; his wife, Morley, and his children, Stephanie and Sam.

Each of the stories is between 18 and 25 minutes in length. There are over 2 hours of stories in all on this set and a bonus video of Stuart performing "I Need to Pee".

Recorded in concert for the CBC Radio show The Vinyl Cafe.

== Track listing ==
Disc 1

1. "Dad is Dying" – 25:04
2. "Gifted" – 22:46
3. "Tree of Heaven" – 21:25

Disc 2

1. "The Phone Message" – 23:42
2. "Labour Pains" – 18:26
3. "Morley's Book Club" – 19:57
4. Bonus Video: "I Need to Pee" – 9:10

== See also ==
- Stuart McLean
- The Vinyl Cafe
- List of Dave and Morley stories
