= The Vinyl Cafe =

Canadian radio and podcast variety show

- The official podcast cover art
- Genre: Variety show
- Running time: 1 hour
- Country of origin: Canada
- Home station: CBC Radio
- Syndicates: Public Radio International
- Starring: Stuart McLean
- Produced by: Jess Milton
- Original release: 1994 – 2015
- Website: www.vinylcafe.com
- Podcast: Vinyl Cafe Stories

The Vinyl Cafe was an hour-long radio variety show hosted by Stuart McLean that was broadcast on CBC Radio and was syndicated to approximately 80 U.S. public radio stations through Public Radio International. It aired on Sunday at noon ET and Tuesday at 11:00 pm ET on CBC Radio One and Saturday at 9 am ET on CBC Radio 2. The program was also available as a CBC podcast, although the podcasts usually contained just McLean's stories and essays for studio episodes because of copyright restrictions on recorded music. CBC Radio also aired a separate weekday afternoon program, under the title Vinyl Cafe Stories, which consisted of two previously recorded Dave and Morley stories per episode.

The show was produced independently by McLean and sold to the CBC. Each season had approximately 26 new episodes. Half of those were recorded in the studio and the other half were done with live audiences in theatres across Canada and the United States. One episode was recorded onboard VIA Rail's transcontinental passenger train The Canadian from the dome observation car, complete with an audience of passengers and featured a rail travel theme. The musical guest was singer songwriter Reid Jamieson.

The Vinyl Cafe stopped touring and producing new episodes following McLean's diagnosis with melanoma in November 2015. McLean announced on December 13, 2016, that he required a second round of treatment, meaning further delay in producing new episodes, and that repeats of past shows would stop airing on CBC Radio One effective January 2017 to "make room for others to share their work on the radio." McLean died on February 15, 2017.

== Content ==
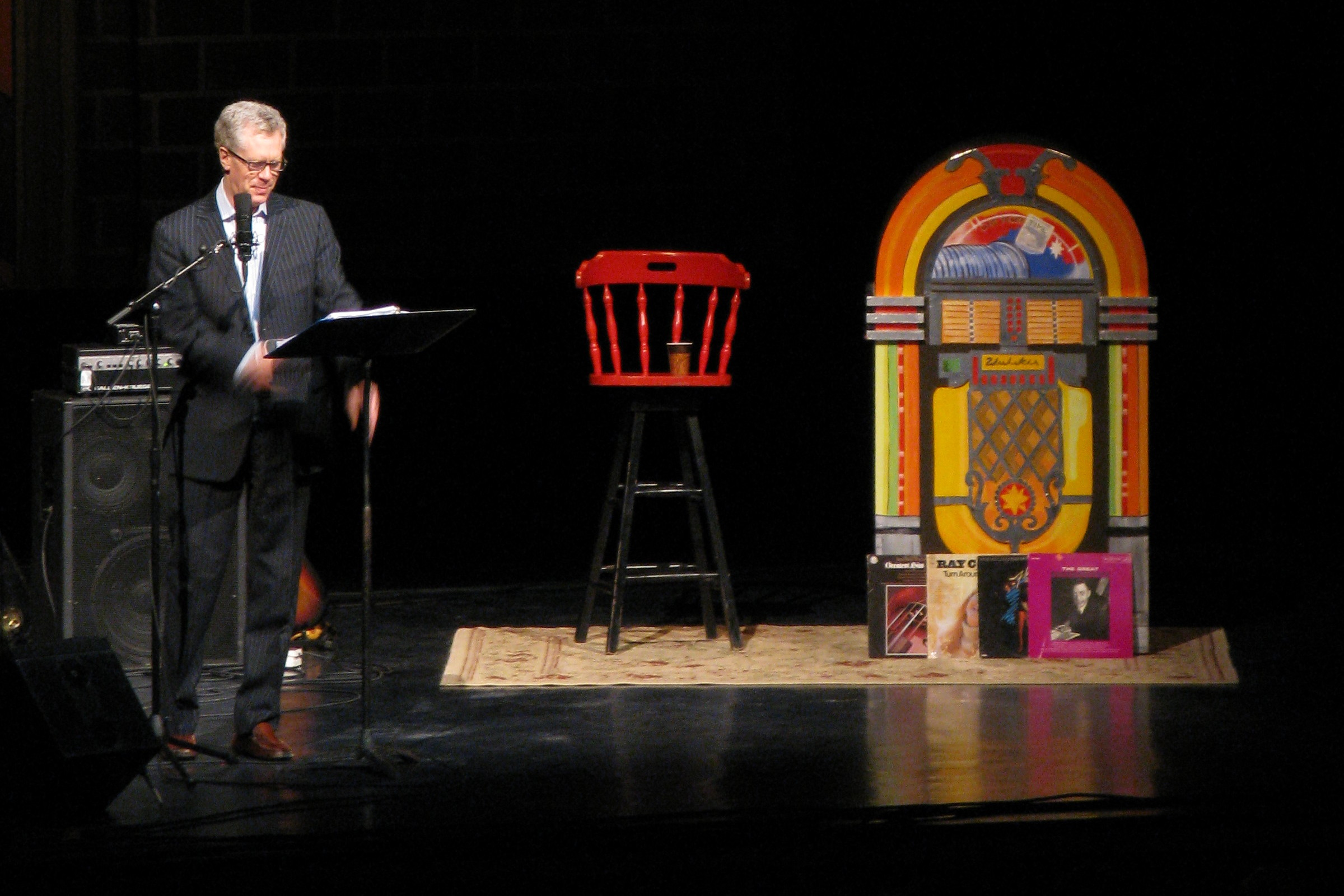
Stuart McLean on stage at the Centennial Concert Hall in Winnipeg, Manitoba

The Vinyl Cafe radio show featured essays, short stories, and music; while frequently humorous, the weekly programs often featured wistfully nostalgic Canadiana. Often performed as a live show from local venues across Canada, the show often began with a complimentary sketch of the venue's community that, "capture the beauty, history and poetry of Canada’s landscape and people." These "Postcards from Canada" have been likened the "collection to a family photo album that captures everyday life in Canada."

A major feature of many of McLean's shows were the "Dave and Morley Stories", which featured a fictional Toronto family. The name "Vinyl Cafe" referred both to the show's musical content and the fictional record shop owned by McLean's character Dave. This aspect of the show had spawned a number of books of short stories, as well as audio recordings. Another feature was "The Vinyl Cafe Story Exchange", where listeners were invited to send in personal true stories to the producers who read selections on air. The series also presented an annual set of awards that were called the "Arthur Awards", which were intended to commend various people who had performed extraordinary good deeds of a small personal nature in the preceding year.

Every episode ended with McLean's signature sign-off, "I'm Stuart McLean, so long for now" and followed by the show's folksy guitar theme song, "Happy Meeting In Glory" (as performed by Ry Cooder). The show was produced by Jess Milton. Meg Masters was the "long-suffering" story editor and the show's founding producer was Dave Amer. Julie Penner was the musical director.

Since 2012 the show has also aired a "best of" spin-off series under the new title of Vinyl Cafe Stories. It features previously recorded stories about Dave and Morley and organized around a common theme, and with one or two studio-recorded musical tracks, but without the live music or local introductions typical of the original run of the show. In January 2023, long-time Vinyl Cafe producer Jess Milton released a new podcast named Backstage at the Vinyl Cafe, which includes McLean’s previously recorded fictional stories and highlights from The Vinyl Cafe radio show and live concerts.

=== Dave and Morley Stories ===
Although they are not featured in every episode of The Vinyl Cafe, the "Dave and Morley Stories" were by far the show's most famous segment. The stories, written and read by McLean, himself, described the many misadventures of Dave, his wife Morley, their children and pets, as well as friends and neighbours. CDs were released of the stories.

For his live performances, McLean often altered his more well-known stories to keep his audience engaged. Today, selected performances are replayed on the CBC Radio One current affairs show, The Current, as holiday programming.

== Collections of stories in book form ==
Canadian Editions

- Stories from the Vinyl Cafe (Penguin Books Canada, 1995, updated and revised edition, 2005)
- Home from the Vinyl Cafe (Penguin Books, 1998)
- Vinyl Cafe Unplugged (Penguin Books, 2001)
- Vinyl Cafe Diaries (Penguin Books, 2003)
- Secrets from the Vinyl Cafe (Penguin Books, 2006)
- Extreme Vinyl Cafe (Viking, 2009)
- Revenge of The Vinyl Cafe (Penguin Books, 2012)
- Vinyl Cafe Turns the Page (Penguin Books, 2015)

US Editions

- Home from the Vinyl Cafe (Simon & Schuster, 2005)

UK Editions

- Home from the Vinyl Cafe (Granta, 2005)
- Vinyl Cafe Unplugged (Granta, 2006)
- The US and UK editions of Home from the Vinyl Cafe are a compilation of stories from the Canadian editions, Stories from the Vinyl Cafe and Home from the Vinyl Cafe.

== Collections of stories in audio form ==
- At the Vinyl Cafe: The Christmas Concert (1997)
- Vinyl Cafe Stories (1998)
- The Vinyl Cafe On Tour (1999)
- Vinyl Cafe Odd Jobs (2001)
- Vinyl Cafe Inc. Coast to Coast Story Service (2002)
- A Story-Gram from Vinyl Cafe Inc. (2004)
- Vinyl Cafe: A Christmas Collection (2005)
- An Important Message from the Vinyl Cafe (2007)
- The Vinyl Cafe Storyland (2008)
- Planet Boy (2009)
- Out and About (2010)
- Vinyl Cafe Family Pack (2011)
- Vinyl Cafe New Stories (2013)
- Vinyl Cafe Seasons (2015)
- Up and Away (2016)
- The Unreleased Stories (2017)

The covers of the Canadian editions of Vinyl Cafe Diaries, Secrets from the Vinyl Cafe, The Vinyl Cafe Coast to Coast Story Service and A Story-gram from the Vinyl Cafe were designed and illustrated by noted writer, artist and cartoonist Seth.

McLean's Vinyl Cafe stories can also be purchased in audio form from the web label Zunior.

== Collections of essays in book form ==
- The Vinyl Cafe Notebooks (October 2010, Viking)

== Reception ==
In 2011, Apple announced their "Best of the Year" awards and The Vinyl Cafe podcast was chosen as the best audio podcast of the year.
