= Melody Moezzi =

Iranian-American writer and attorney (born 1979)

- Born: Melody Moezzi; March 4, 1979 (age 47); Chicago, Illinois, U.S.
- Education: Wesleyan University, Emory University School of Law, Emory's Rollins School of Public Health
- Occupation: Writer
- Spouse: Matthew Lenard

Melody Moezzi (Persian: ملودی معزی; born March 4, 1979) is an Iranian-American writer and attorney. She writes and speaks about religion, public health, politics and culture. She is the author of The Rumi Prescription: How an Ancient Mystic Poet Changed My Modern Manic Life, Haldol and Hyacinths: A Bipolar Life and War on Error: Real Stories of American Muslims. Moezzi is a United Nations Global Expert and formerly the Executive Director of the Atlanta-based interfaith nonprofit "100 People of Faith".

== Biography ==
Moezzi has written for The New York Times, The Washington Post, CNN, Parabola, The Huffington Post, NPR, and Ms. magazine, among others. She was a columnist for the short-lived Muslim Girl Magazine. Moezzi speaks openly about having bipolar disorder and is a regular columnist and blogger for Bipolar Magazine.

Moezzi has appeared on several television and radio programs, including CNN, NPR, BBC, PRI and Air America. She founded the activist group Hooping for Peace. Moezzi holds degrees from Wesleyan University, Emory University School of Law, and Emory's Rollins School of Public Health.

== Publications ==
=== Books ===
- War on Error: Real Stories of American Muslims. University of Arkansas Press. 2007. ISBN 9781557288554.
- Haldol and Hyacinths: A Bipolar Life. Avery Publishing. 2013. ISBN 9781583334683.
- The Rumi Prescription: How an Ancient Mystic Poet Changed My Modern Manic Life, TarcherPerigee (2020).

== Awards ==
- 2007 Georgia Author of the Year Awards (GAYA) winner for Creative Non-Fiction (Essay) for War on Error
- 2008 Gustavus Myers Book Award honorable mention for War on Error
