= Revenge of The Vinyl Cafe =

Book by Stuart McLean

Revenge of the Vinyl Cafe
- Author: Stuart McLean
- Cover artist: Owen Richardson
- Language: English
- Genre: Fiction
- Publisher: Viking by Penguin Books Canada Limited
- Publication date: 2012
- Publication place: Canada
- Media type: Print (hardback & paperback)
- Pages: 241 pp
- ISBN: 978-0-670-06474-8 (hardcover), 978-0-143-17604-6 (paperback)
- Preceded by: Extreme Vinyl Cafe
- Followed by: Time Now for the Vinyl Cafe Story Exchange

Revenge of the Vinyl Cafe (2012) is Stuart McLean's fifth book of stories that first aired on the CBC Radio program The Vinyl Cafe. It debuted at #1 in The Globe and Mail’s bestseller list. It is the only book in the Vinyl Cafe series to have its own theme music, selected by CBC Radio listeners and written by Ottawa band The PepTides Stories included in Revenge of the Vinyl Cafe:

- "Hello Monster"
- "Annie’s Turn"
- "Macaulay’s Mountain"
- "Tour de Dave"
- "The House Next Door"
- "Summer of Stars"
- "Rhoda’s Revenge"
- "Fish Head"
- "Rosemary Honey"
- "The Haunted House of Cupcakes"
- "Midnight in the Garden of Envy"
- "The Black Beast of Margaree"
- "Curse of the Crayfish"
- "Whatever Happened to Johnny Flowers?"
- "Attack of the Treadmill"
- "Gabriel Dubois"
- "Code Yellow"
- "Le Morte d'Arthur"

== See also ==
- List of Dave and Morley stories
