= Home from the Vinyl Cafe =

Short story collection by Stuart McLean

- Author: Stuart McLean
- Illustrator: Wesley Bates
- Language: English
- Publisher: Viking by Penguin Books Canada Limited
- Publication date: 1998
- Publication place: Canada
- Media type: Print (hardback & paperback)
- Pages: 256 pp
- ISBN: 0-14-027743-9 (paperback)
- Preceded by: When We Were Young: A Collection of Canadian Stories
- Followed by: Vinyl Cafe Unplugged

Home from the Vinyl Cafe (1998) is Stuart McLean's second volume of stories that first aired on the CBC Radio program The Vinyl Cafe. It was the winner of the 1999 Stephen Leacock Award for Humour.

Stories included in Home from the Vinyl Cafe:

- Dave Cooks the Turkey
- Holland
- Valentine's Day
- Sourdough
- Music Lessons
- Burd
- Emil
- The Birthday Party
- Summer Camp
- The Cottage
- Road Trip
- Labour Days
- School Days
- A Day Off
- On the Roof
- Polly Anderson's Christmas Party

== See also ==
- List of Dave and Morley stories
