= Vinyl Cafe Diaries =

2003 volume of stories by Stuart McLean

- Author: Stuart McLean
- Illustrator: Seth
- Cover artist: Seth
- Language: English
- Publisher: Viking by Penguin Books Canada Limited
- Publication date: 2003
- Publication place: Canada
- Media type: Print (hardback & paperback)
- Pages: 302 pp
- ISBN: 0-670-04436-9 (hardcover), 0143014803 (paperback)
- Preceded by: Vinyl Cafe Unplugged
- Followed by: Stories from the Vinyl Cafe 10th Anniversary Edition

Vinyl Cafe Diaries (2003) is Stuart McLean's fourth volume of stories that first aired on the CBC Radio program The Vinyl Cafe. It made the 2004 Stephen Leacock Award for Humour shortlist, and was the winner of the 2004 Canadian Authors Association Award.

Stories included in Vinyl Cafe Diaries:

- Walking Man
- Dave and the Duck
- Tree of Heaven
- Lazy Lips
- Labour Pains
- Birthday Present
- Rashida, Amir and the Great Gift-Giving
- Book Club
- A Night to Remember
- Dorm Days
- Best Things
- Christmas on the Road
- Field Trip
- No Tax on Truffles
- Gifted
- Planet Boy

== See also ==
- List of Dave and Morley stories
