= Vinyl Cafe Unplugged =

2000 volume of stories by Stuart McLean

- Author: Stuart McLean
- Illustrator: Wesley Bates
- Language: English
- Publisher: Viking by Penguin Books Canada Limited
- Publication date: 2000
- Publication place: Canada
- Media type: Print (hardback & paperback)
- Pages: 255 pp
- ISBN: 0-670-89653-5 (hardcover)
- Preceded by: Home from the Vinyl Cafe
- Followed by: Vinyl Cafe Diaries

Vinyl Cafe Unplugged (2000) is Stuart McLean's third volume of stories that first aired on the CBC Radio program The Vinyl Cafe. In 2001, it won the Stephen Leacock Award for Humour. This was the second time that Stuart McLean had won for his writings on The Vinyl Cafe.

Stories included in Vinyl Cafe Unplugged:

- Arthur
- Galway
- The Fly
- Christmas Presents
- Harrison Ford's Toes
- Dorothy
- The Last Kind Word Blues
- The Bare Truth
- Susan is Serious
- Odd Jobs
- The Razor's Edge
- Morley's Christmas Pageant
- Figs
- Love Never Ends

== See also ==
- List of Dave and Morley stories
