= List of Dave and Morley stories =

The following is a list of stories written by Stuart McLean featuring his popular fictional characters "Dave and Morley" from the radio program The Vinyl Cafe. First read on air in 1994, many of the stories were eventually compiled in book form, followed by audio recording compilations from the program. After McLean's death, select stories are rerun on CBC Radio One's current affairs show, The Current, as holiday programing.

Note that this list features only the stories that have been published in book form and on audio. Numerous other stories have been written and read out loud on the radio show, but are not currently listed - 173 have been reissued as of 2024. Several stories also have titles in the book different from those on the audio versions.

The first collection of stories in book form, Stories from the Vinyl Cafe, contains several stories that did not feature Dave and Morley or any other characters acquainted with them. Subsequent collections of stories featured Dave and Morley-related content exclusively.

== Characters ==
The major characters in the stories are Dave, Morley, their family and assorted friends and neighbours. The family's last name is never mentioned, although in one story Dave's mother's name is given as Margaret McNeil.

=== Dave, Morley, and Family ===
- Dave is in his late forties to early fifties. He runs an independent record store, called "The Vinyl Cafe", whose slogan is "We may not be big, but we're small". Dave represents an alternative view on life that is not based on financial success and status but on human relationships and music. He grew up in Big Narrows (fictional place, but there is a place called Grand Narrows), on Cape Breton Island, where his mother Margaret still resides. Dave is frequently neurotic and prone to small accidents and mishaps that he usually inadvertently escalates into major ones and he is somewhat of a hypochondriac. He is painfully awkward and a terrible liar. These attributes motivate many of the stories, which range from an incident with the Christmas turkey, to accidentally destroying Mary Turlington's treasured candles, to filling the elementary school playground with frogs. It is his wife, Morley, who often has to resolve the mess Dave creates.

Dave enjoys a good prank and has a tradition of pulling outrageous jokes on his friend, Kenny Wong (owner of "Wong's Scottish Meat Pies"), every April Fools' Day. Dave worked as a tour manager "for some of the best indie acts; certainly for some of the weirdest" before he met Morley. His enjoyment of pranks is seen in his younger days as a tour manager, as well. Dave's last name has never been revealed; although in "School Days", his mother's last name is McNeil, it's unclear whether she uses her married name or reverted to her maiden name after Dave's father died.

- Morley was a stay-at-home mom, until she re-entered the workforce. She is currently employed at a local theatre. She loves to figure-skate. She and Dave first met at an ice-rink in Providence, Rhode Island, when they were in their twenties. She is often more level-headed and practical than Dave and frequently long-suffering when it comes to his adventures. Morley works hard at running the family and, more often than not, Dave is more like a third child to her. Dave will then go to great lengths to prove his love again. Morley was named for McLean's personal friend David Morley; the story "Skunks", the first to introduce Morley, was inspired by a real incident that had happened to David Morley's family.
- Stephanie is a jaded and skeptical Toronto teenager who often fights with her brother Sam. In the first stories, she was fourteen or fifteen years old. She was frequently rebellious and sullen which led to many disagreements with her parents and Sam. In more recent stories, she attends university in another city and dates a young man named Tommy Nowlan. Since then, some episodes feature coming of age stories. She spent one summer planting trees north of Thunder Bay. Soon after her job ended, Stephanie visited her aged 'Aunt Dorothy' in England. She assumed that she would dislike the trip but discovered an interest in history and the past while on her trip.
- Sam is about seven or eight years younger than Stephanie. In many stories, he was referred to as seven; although his age has recently made a jump to age eleven. Only a few stories have Sam placed at any age between seven and eleven. Despite his ineptitude at sports, he plays goalie on his hockey team and plays on the girls field hockey team, which was the subject of one story. He likes to knit and help his neighbours, Eugene and Maria. Sam is frequently portrayed as sensitive, slightly goofy and often naive. Several of his friends have been minor characters in several stories. This includes a skateboarding girl whom he met on a school trip to Quebec City, when he missed the bus to an IMAX theatre; although they spoke different languages and he never got her contact information or even her name, it proved an exhilaratingly romantic experience for the boy. According to Stuart McLean's friends and colleagues, Sam is the character who most resembles McLean himself.
- Arthur is the family dog. He likes soft ice-cream and considers himself dominant to Dave (much to Dave's surprise) and steals socks and potatoes. He was once a sheep in a Christmas pageant. Arthur is considered a full family member. In a story at the end of the Revenge of the Vinyl Cafe collection (2015), Arthur dies of old age and is mourned by the family. After the story of his death was originally broadcast on the radio show, McLean named his "Arthur Awards", an annual episode in which he would present awards to people whose acts of kindness and generosity were nominated by listeners, after the dog.
- Galway is the mysterious family cat, who came from Dave's sister Annie, and is named for American poet Galway Kinnell. Galway was intentionally brought on one family vacation and accidentally came on another, by stowing away in the trunk. The vacation was ruined partially due to her. She was briefly toilet-trained (until she almost flushed herself down the toilet) but still enjoys flushing the toilet when the bathroom door is left open.
- Margaret is Dave's mother. She still lives in Dave's childhood home in Big Narrows. Before retirement, Margaret taught elementary school in Big Narrows and was known for her ability to burp the alphabet. After the death of her husband and Dave's father, Charlie, she was a widow for many years. She recently remarried a local volunteer firefighter named Smith Gardener.
- Charlie is Dave's father. He died before the stories began and in the story Fish Head, Dave mentions that Charlie died just before Sam was born. Charlie was musically talented and introduced both his children to music. He would wake them up singing each morning and would often have local musicians over to the house for an informal jam session.
- Annie is Dave's younger sister. The age gap is never clear but seems to be about three years. Annie is a concert violinist and has a daughter, Margot. When she is on tour one summer, she asks Dave and Morley to care for Margot, who is ten years old at the time. Galway was given to Dave and Morley by Annie as she could not keep a cat while touring.
- Helen is Morley's mother. In the initial stories, Helen (sometimes called Nancy) is still married to Morley's father. However, in the later stories, it is mentioned that Morley's father has died. Helen briefly lives with the family when Morley is concerned about her ability to live alone. The arrangement ends after only a few months when Helen moves into a retirement community.
- Aunt Dorothy is a cousin of Margaret. She lives in London, England, and has never married or had children. She is known for her brusqueness and impulsiveness about travel, having invited herself to go camping with Dave and his family, and having sent Stephanie, unannounced, a prepaid air ticket to London so she could visit.

=== Other recurring characters ===
- Jim Scoffield is Dave's closest friend and neighbour, although he has a tendency to be present at Dave's most awkward moments, such as Dave's infamous incident with the Christmas turkey. Jim is originally from the Annapolis Valley, Nova Scotia. He is described as a "confirmed bachelor" and owns a cat named Molly. He briefly dated one of Dave's cousins and a romantic relationship with his friend and cat sitter has been hinted at.
- Bert and Mary Turlington live next door to Dave and Morley. They have three children, Adam, who is younger than Stephanie, and twins Chris and Christina, who are older than Sam. Bert is a talkative criminal lawyer, while Mary is a chartered accountant and Dave's neighbourhood nemesis. Her meticulous perfectionism and fixed ideas of an ordered life make her Dave's opposite; her plans and projects are frequently upended by Dave's propensity for causing chaos. Mary resents that Dave loves his job, considering his happy-go-lucky lifestyle sanctimonious and phony, while Dave thinks that Mary is stiff and intimidating. They have a teacup Pomeranian dog named Tissue.
- Ted and Polly Anderson are an elegant upper-class couple who throw an annual Christmas house-party. Polly is the neighbourhood's "Martha Stewart" figure and "perfect home-maker". Morley often feels inadequate around Polly. Ted is an avid cyclist.
- Carl and Gerta Lowbeer are neighbours of Morley and Dave. They are somewhat older, Carl having recently retired from his job as an engineer. He keenly missed the company fishing trip and has since started to attend the fishing tourney with Dave and other neighbours as part of his team. Since retirement, Carl has begun to take philosophy courses. Carl once asked Dave to "babysit" his sourdough bread starter, while he and Gerta were on holiday. Gerta has been revealed to be a keen birdwatcher and is a close friend of Morley.
- Morty and Irene Zuckerman live on Brock Avenue, a five-minute walk away. Not particularly close friends, Morty's surprise invitation to dinner one night is the subject of the story "Late Date".
- Emir and Rashida Chudary are new residents in Dave and Morley's neighbourhood. Emir considers Dave to be an imbecile & their families do not socialize much. However, Emirs' attitude softens after Rashida recruits Dave to help their young daughter Fatima overcome her nightmares, a problem Dave's daughter Stephanie also suffered from at a young age. Their lack of understanding of Canadian gift giving expectations at Christmas sparks a mass gift exchange in the neighbourhood on one occasion. Sam and his friend Murphy occasionally babysit Fatima one summer, which prompts the creation of the infamous water slide.
- Eugene and Maria Conte are an elderly couple who live next-door. Eugene loves to garden. His famous fig tree is the focus of a story. Maria loves to dote on the children. They have a son, Anthony Thomas, who lives in London. They have always called Anthony Thomas "Tony" but he has been going by his middle name ever since moving to England. Eugene is originally from a village in Calabria called Rendi in Fiori. Sam and Eugene are friends, and Sam helps with the emails that Tony sends them. Eugene makes home-made wine, and has offered it to Sam on several occasions. He tends to smoke cigars. Dave is often concerned about their well being and their strange habit of only living in the basement of their house but realizes they will ask for help when they need it. Morely first meets Maria when brings over a basket of homegrown tomatoes after Stephanie is born.
- Kenny Wong runs Wong's Scottish Meat Pies, a shop located near the Vinyl Cafe. It is largely referred to as a Chinese restaurant, but has once supplied meat pies and deep-fried Mars bars to Sam's birthday party. Kenny is from the town of Burnt Creek. While he was living there, he and his family were excluded by most of the town's citizens because they were the only Chinese family living there. Kenny is known for his austerity and his loyalty to his "regulars". He enjoys pranks just as much as Dave, who is frequently the victim in his jokes, and vice versa.
- Murphy Kruger is in Sam's class and his best friend. He and Sam cause some minor mischief in several stories and live in their own world. Murphy often motivates Sam to their adventures. Murphy is Jewish and has a Bar Mitzvah in one episode.
- Peter Moore is another one of Sam's friends. On the grade 8 trip to Quebec City, Peter spent all of his money on plastic trolls.
- Emil is a homeless man who resides around the Vinyl Cafe and occasionally asks for money from various people around the neighbourhood. He has his own philosophy of life, and is a lovable misfit who for some time had his own library in a shopping cart and started gardening plants in public places. He once won ten thousand dollars in the lottery, which he quickly gave away to his regular donors.
- Dorothy Capper is a friend of Dave's, who owns "Woodsworth's Books". Her store is located down the street from the Vinyl Cafe, and Dave frequently stops by just to hang out and ask for advice on some neurotic problem. There have been two stories focused on her in the series. The first one is about her problems with her dog, Stanley, and the second is about her growing disinterest in owning a book store. At the end of the story, her zest for selling books is renewed and she continues to run her store.
- Marcus Portnoy is the bully at Sam's school.

== Collections of Stories in Book Form ==
=== Stories from the Vinyl Cafe (1995) ===
- The Pig
- Tunnel of Love
- Rock of Ages (not about Dave and Morley)
- The Jock Strap
- New York City (not about Dave and Morley)
- Breakfast, Lunch, Dinner ("Late Date with the Zuckermans")
- Stanley (not about Dave and Morley, but about Dorothy Capper, an acquaintance)
- Driving Lessons ("Driving")
- Fresh, Never Frozen (not about Dave and Morley)
- Skunks
- Sports Injuries (not about Dave and Morley)
- Shirts
- The Secret of Life (not about Dave and Morley)
- Dorothy
- A Ton of Fun (not about Dave and Morley)
- Be-Bop-A-Lula ("Blood Pressure Chair")
- Polaroids (not about Dave and Morley)
- Make Money! Get Prizes!
- Remembrance Day (found only on 10-year anniversary edition of the book)

=== Home from the Vinyl Cafe (1998) ===
- Dave Cooks the Turkey
- Holland
- Valentine's Day
- Sourdough
- Music Lessons
- Burd ("The Bird")
- Emil
- The Birthday Party ("Credit Card Birthday")
- Summer Camp
- The Cottage
- Road Trip ("Cat in the Car")
- Labour Days
- School Days
- A Day Off ("Day Off")
- On the Roof ("Dave on the Roof")
- Polly Anderson's Christmas Party

=== Vinyl Cafe Unplugged (2000) ===
- Arthur ("Arthur the Dog")
- Galway ("Toilet Training the Cat")
- The Fly
- Christmas Presents
- Harrison Ford's Toes
- Dorothy ("Cousin Dorothy")
- The Last Kind Word Blues
- The Bare Truth
- Susan is Serious
- Odd Jobs
- The Razor's Edge
- Morley's Christmas Pageant ("Morley's Christmas Concert")
- Figs ("The Fig Tree")
- Love Never Ends

=== Vinyl Cafe Diaries (2003) ===
- Walking Man
- Dave and the Duck ("Dave's Wedding Ring")
- Tree of Heaven
- Lazy Lips ("Dave Gives a Speech")
- Labour Pains
- Birthday Presents ("Morley's Birthday Bash")
- Rashida, Amir and the Great Gift-Giving ("Christmas with Rasheeda and Ahmeer")
- Book Club ("Morley's Book Club")
- A Night to Remember ("Dave Goes Babysitting")
- Dorm Days
- Best Things
- Christmas on the Road
- Field Trip
- No Tax on Truffles
- Gifted
- Planet Boy

=== Secrets from the Vinyl Cafe (2006) ===
- Opera
- Carl's Retirement
- Tree Planting
- Sam the Athlete
- Rendi
- Sam's Predictions
- Kenny Wong's Practical Jokes
- The Hairdresser
- Dad is Dying
- Teeth
- Dave and the Dentist
- The Laundry Chute ("Springhill")
- The Phone Message
- A Science Experiment
- Christmas at the Turlingtons
- The Family Business ("Sam Steals")

=== Extreme Vinyl Cafe (2009) ===
- Sam Goes Green
- The Birthday Cake
- Spring in the Narrows
- Wally
- London
- Dave's Funeral ("Dave Buys a Coffin")
- Petit Lac Noir
- Rat-a-tat-tat
- A Trip to Quebec
- Newsboy Dave
- The Waterslide
- Margaret Gets Married
- The Cruise
- The Lottery Ticket
- Dave and the Roller Coaster

=== The Vinyl Cafe Notebooks (2010) ===
NOTES FROM HOME

- Driving the 401
- The Piano
- My Palm Tree
- Losing Paul
- Watchfulness
- My To Do List
- Ants
- Keepsakes
- The Sentimentality of Suits
- The Morning Paper
- Radio
- Peter Gzowski
- The People You Love

CALENDAR NOTES

- Signs of Spring
- Maple Syrup Time
- Early April 2009
- Worms
- Summer Jobs
- September
- A Letter to a Young Friend Heading Back to School
- Autumn
- Piano Tuners
- Approaching Winter
- Hibernation
- Salt of the Earth
- February
- Snowman

NOTES FROM THE NEIGHBOURHOOD

- Boy, Bike, Chair
- Toronto
- The Parking Spot
- Garbage
- Haircuts by Children
- The World Cup
- The Front Lawn
- Kissing Contest
- Small Decisions
- Silence
- George Learns to Swim
- The Key
- Safe Places
- The Girl with the Globe

TASTING NOTES

- New Year’s Eggs
- The Tall Grass Prairie Bread Company
- Apple Peeling
- Watermelon
- Ode to the Potato
- The Bay Leaf
- Cherry Season 2006
- READER’S NOTES
- Book Buying
- The Thomas Fisher Rare Book Library
- W.O. Mitchell
- The Island of No Adults
- Free Books
- The Creation of Sam McGee
- Quentin Reynolds
- Leacock Country

NOTES FROM THE ROAD

- The Way Which Is Not the Way
- In Praise of Curling
- Robert Stanfield's Grave
- The Imperial Theatre, Saint John, New Brunswick
- Biking Across Canada
- Bridge Walking
- Getting to Swift Current
- Prairie Wind
- Parliament Hill
- Maynard Helmer
- Motels
- Meeting Famous People
- Maxine Montgomery
- Gander International Airport
- My Favourite Photograph
- Roger Woodward and Niagara Falls

NOTES TO SELF

- My Hello Problem
- Summer Jobs Redux
- Rug versus Chair
- Spelling
- I Am Deeply Sorry
- The Joy of Socks
- On Beauty
- The Wall Clock
- Parking Lot Blues
- The National Umbrella Collective
- Bob Dylan’s Phone Number
- The Girl in the Green Dress
- The Desk Lamp

=== Revenge of the Vinyl Cafe (2012) ===
- Hello, Monster
- Annie's Turn
- Macaulay's Mountain
- Tour de Dave ("Dave and the Bike")
- The House Next Door
- Summer of Stars
- Rhoda's Revenge
- Fish Head
- Rosemary Honey
- The Haunted House of Cupcakes
- Midnight in the Garden of Envy
- The Black Beast of Margaree
- Curse of the Crayfish
- Whatever Happened to Johnny Flowers?
- Attack of the Treadmill ("Dave's Shoelace")
- Gabriel Dubois
- Code Yellow
- Le Morte d'Arthur

=== Vinyl Cafe Turns The Page (2016) ===
- Sam's Underwear
- Defibrillator
- Danceland
- Boy Wanted
- Jim and Molly the Cat
- Stephanie's Exam
- Stamps
- Foggy Bottom Bay
- Murphy's Signature
- Helen Moves In
- Float Tank
- Home Alone
- In The Weeds
- Prince Charles
- Jim's Train Trip
- Sam's First Kiss
- Roadkill
- Yoga Camp
- Town Hall

=== The Vinyl Cafe Celebrates (2021) ===
- The Waterslide
- School Lunch
- Fireworks
- The Mermaid and Other Mysteries
- Birthday Present
- Dave Cooks the Turkey
- Mary Turlington and Polly Anderson's Christmas Collision
- The World's Smallest Record Store
- Opera
- Tree Planting
- The Laundry Chute
- Dave the Dog Walker
- Mary Turlington Has Lice
- The Lost Chords
- Jim's Toboggan
- Le Morte d'Arthur
- Labour Pains
- The Canoe Trip
- Odd Jobs
- Love Never Ends

== Collections of Stories in Audio Form ==
=== At the Vinyl Cafe: The Christmas Concert (1997) ===
The 1996 Christmas special of the Vinyl Cafe was released on audio and features two stories:

- Dave on the Roof ("On the Roof")
- Dave Cooks the Turkey

=== Vinyl Cafe Stories (1998) ===
- The Jock Strap (9:17)
- Holland (18:49)
- Driving Lessons (7:59)
- School Days (17:14)
- The Bird (17:47)
- Cat in the Car (18:50)
- Emil (14:33)
- A Day Off (10:09)
- Polly Anderson's Christmas Party (23:08)

=== The Vinyl Cafe On Tour (1999) ===
- Late Date (13:26)
- Morley's Christmas Concert (23:53)
- School Lunch (16:00)
- The Fly (19:04)
- Harrison Ford's Toes (22:45)
- Blood Pressure Chair (15:21)
- Sam's Birthday (17:35)
- Cousin Dorothy (16:32)

=== Vinyl Cafe Odd Jobs (2001) ===
- Toilet Training the Cat (20:54)
- Music Lessons (16:05)
- Arthur the Dog (14:34)
- Love Never Ends (22:30)
- Odd Jobs (18:20)
- The Fig Tree (17:36)
- No Tax on Truffles (22:09)
- The Bare Truth (16:24)

=== Vinyl Cafe Inc. Coast to Coast Story Service (2002) ===
- Dave Goes Babysitting (24:33)
- Morley's Birthday Bash (23:34)
- Dave Gives a Speech (24:36)
- Kenny Wong's Practical Jokes (26:49)
- Dave's Wedding Ring (20:13)
- Christmas with Rasheeda and Ahmeer (23:19)

=== A Story-Gram From Vinyl Cafe Inc. (2004) ===
- Dad is Dying (25:06)
- Gifted (22:48)
- Tree of Heaven (21:28)
- The Phone Message (23:46)
- Labour Pains (18:27)
- Morley's Book Club (19:58)
- Bonus Video: "I Need to Pee" (9:10)

=== Vinyl Cafe: A Christmas Collection (2005) ===
- Dave Cooks the Turkey (26:18)
- Ferrets for Christmas (24:49)
- Christmas on the Road (24:15)
- Christmas at the Turlingtons' (22:30)
- Polly Anderson's Christmas Party (22:57)
- Christmas Presents (20:30)
- On the Roof ("Dave on the Roof") (9:53)

=== An Important Message From The Vinyl Cafe (2007) ===
- The Hairdresser (20:16)
- Sam the Athlete (21:29)
- Tree Planting (17:53)
- Dream Bunnies (19:10)
- Teeth (24:29)
- Sam Goes Green (24:01)
- Carl's Retirement (21:29)

=== The Vinyl Cafe Storyland (2008) ===
- Dave Goes to the Dentist (20:28)
- Springhill ("The Laundry Chute") (20:49)
- Sam Steals ("The Family Business") (21:56)
- Dave's Shoelace ("Attack of the Treadmill") (15:25)
- Remembrance Day (23:05)
- Dave Buys a Coffin ("Dave's Funeral") (23:53)
- Jim and Molly the Cat (23:29)

=== Vinyl Cafe Planet Boy (2009) ===
- Planet Boy (24:21)
- The Science Experiment (22:54)
- A Trip to Quebec (28:39)
- The Waterslide (22:34)
- Sam's Predictions (22:48)
- Wally (20:49)
- Planet Stuart (9:50)

=== Vinyl Cafe: Out and About (2010) ===
- Petit Lac Noir (26:18)
- The Cruise (25:00)
- Rendi (21:34)
- The Birthday Cake (21:15)
- Opera (23:45)
- The Canoe Trip (19:32)
- Dave and the Bike (15:24)

=== Vinyl Cafe Family Pack (2011) ===
- Dave Goes to the Dentist (20:26)
- Odd Jobs (18:14)
- Dave and the Bike (15:18)
- Dave Cooks the Turkey (26:02)
- Holland (18:22)
- The Hairdresser (20:15)
- Labour Pains (18:25)
- Morley's Book Club (19:56)
- The Waterslide (22:35)
- Tree Planting (17:52)
- Sam the Athlete (20:19)
- Dream Bunnies (19:09)
- Cat in the Car (18:12)
- Arthur the Dog (14:33)
- Dave and the Duck (20:00)
- Toilet Training the Cat (20:41)

=== Vinyl Cafe Christmas Pack (2012) ===
- Christmas on the Road (24:18)
- Christmas in the Narrows (21:46)
- Dave's Christmas Parade (20:24)
- Dave Makes Snow (22:38)
- Morley's Christmas Concert (23:53)
- Dave Raises the Turkey (23:58)
- Rashida, Amir and the Great Gift-Giving (23:16)
- Polly Anderson's Christmas Party (22:44)
- Christmas at the Turlingtons' (22:30)
- Dave on the Roof (10:07)
- Ferrets for Christmas (24:47)
- Christmas Presents (20:32)
- Dave Cooks the Turkey (1996 original recording; bonus track) (21:38)

=== Vinyl Cafe: New Stories (2013) ===
- Sam's Underwear (18:28)
- Car Wash (15:35)
- Macaulay's Mountain (21:04)
- Code Yellow (22:46)
- The House Next Door (25:47)
- Curse of the Crayfish (22:52)
- Hello, Monster (25:45)
- The Yoga Retreat (16:33)
- Summer of Stars (20:34)
- London (23:05)
- Skunks (11:39)
- Annie's Turn (21:22)
- Sam's First Kiss (23:19)
- Grocery Cart (10:49)
- Le Morte D'Arthur (22:23)

=== Vinyl Cafe Auto Pack (2014) ===
- Defibrillator (26:28)
- Rosemary Honey (23:42)
- Spring in the Narrows (25:56)
- Dave the Dog Walker (23:25)
- Boy Wanted (22:03)
- Dorothy's Bookstore (8:32)
- The Lottery Ticket (21:53)
- The Black Beast of Margaree (20:07)
- Kenny Wong's Contest (21:37)
- Rhoda's Revenge (19:23)
- Newsboy Dave (16:54)
- Dave and the Roller Coaster (22:28)
- Shirts (16:34)
- Dog Pills (12:49)
- Fish Head (20:59)

=== The Vinyl Cafe Christmas Album (2014) ===
- Dave Cooks the Turkey (21:39)
- Christmas at the Turlingtons' (22:24)

Vinyl LP with MP3 download code.

=== Vinyl Cafe: Seasons (2015) ===
- Dave Makes Maple Syrup (22:17)
- Steph's Statistics Exam (23:37)
- The Man Who Punched Trees (25:55)
- Mexican Climbing Mint (22:48)
- Whatever Happened to Johnny Flowers? (22:06)
- Dave and the Mouse (24:27)
- Fireworks (19:06)
- Steph Goes to University (21:34)
- Halloween (24:32)
- Jim's Toboggan (18:27)
- Mary Turlington & Polly Anderson's Christmas Collision (24:51)
- Christmas at Tommy's (24:59)

=== Vinyl Cafe: Up and Away (2016) ===
- Kenny Wong and the Tank of Tranquility (18:21)
- Mary Turlington Has Lice (20:12)
- Dave and the Sourdough Starter (14:58)
- The Roundabout (19:33)
- The Greatest Hockey Game Ever Played (27:47)
- Sam Is Home Alone (23:29)
- Jimmy Walker of Foggy Bottom Bay (24:45)
- Arthur Takes the Cake (12:45)
- The Razor's Edge (20:54)
- A Letter from Camp (21:51)
- Dave and Tommy (19:27)
- Field Trip (23:01)
- Rock of Ages (11:31)
- The Turlingtons' Dog (17:14)
- Fire at the Old Town Hall (20:03)

=== Vinyl Cafe: The Unreleased Stories (2017) ===
- Dave and the Vacuum (18:53)
- The Summer Cottage (14:35)
- Morley's Garden (17:41)
- The Christmas Card (24:53)
- Murphy's Bar Mitzvah (19:04)
- World's Smallest Record Store (20:56)
- Stephanie and Tommy (21:27)
- Dave Crosses the Border (24:06)
- In the Weeds (22:36)
- Murphy Kruger, Philatelist (21:46)
- Have Snake, Will Travel (21:08)
- Dave's Inferno (22:00)
- The Lost Chords (20:15)

=== Vinyl Cafe 25 Years Vol.1 Dave and Morley Stories (2019) ===
- Dave and the Cell Phone (20:09)
- Margaret Gets Married (23:13)
- The One and Only Murphy Kruger (21:46)
- Dave Versus the Flu (16:57)
- A Case of the Dwindles (18:55)
- Why I Buy 8-tracks (11:36)
- The Great Train Adventure (21:45)
- Dave's Truck (22:10)
- Stanley the Snoring Dog (19:29)
- Walking Man (22:21)
- The Mermaid and Other Mysteries (23:31)
- Dave's Christmas Tree (21:44)
- Dave and Morley, Dancing (22:47)

=== Vinyl Cafe: Christmas Gifts (2022) ===
- Rat-a-tat-tat (18:44)
- Stephanie's Mystery Book (20:35)
- Morley's Christmas Present (23:41)

=== Vinyl Cafe: To Morley, With Love (2023) ===
- Susan is Serious (22:48)
- The Pot (18:45)
- The Wedding Dress (22:01)

=== Vinyl Cafe: Merry Christmas Dave (2023) ===
- Christmas at the Store (23:42)
- Dave Plays Santa (22:11)
- Dave's Letter (23:01)

=== Vinyl Cafe: So Long For Now (2024) ===
- Dave's Last Kind Word Blues (23:39)
- Morley and the Century of Wind Theater Company (18:55)
- On-Stage Defibrillator (25:40)
