= The Vinyl Cafe Notebooks =

2010 book by Stuart McLean

- Author: Stuart McLean
- Cover artist: Dan Page
- Language: English
- Genre: Non-fiction
- Publisher: Viking by Penguin Books Canada Limited
- Publication date: 2010
- Publication place: Canada
- Media type: Print (hardcover)
- Pages: 344 pp
- ISBN: 978-0-670-06473-1

Vinyl Cafe Notebooks: a collection of essays from The Vinyl Cafe (2010) is Stuart McLean's ninth book and each one has been a Canadian bestseller. McLean has sold over 1 million books in Canada. Unlike the other "Vinyl Cafe" books, these are not "Dave and Morley stories".

Selected from 15 years of radio-show archives and re-edited by the author, this eclectic essay collection provides a glimpse into the thoughtful mind at work behind The Vinyl Cafe. From meditations on peacekeeping to praise for the toothpick, The Vinyl Cafe Notebooks runs the gamut from considered argument to light-hearted opinion. Whether McLean is visiting a forgotten corner of the Canadian Shield, a big-city doughnut factory, or Sir John A. Macdonald's gravesite, his observations are absorbing, unexpected, and original. With thought-provoking proposals about the world we live in and introductions to the people he meets in his extensive travels across our country, The Vinyl Cafe Notebooks is informed by McLean's intimate relationship with Canada and Canadians. Yet the collection is also an intriguing look at the writer himself—his past, his present, and his vision of the future. Sometimes funny, often wise, and always entertaining, The Vinyl Cafe Notebooks provides a wealth of reading pleasure that fans will return to again and again.

== See also ==
- Stuart McLean
- The Vinyl Cafe
