= The Unquiet Dead (novel) =

2015 novel by Ausma Zehanat Khan

- First edition
- Author: Ausma Zehanat Khan
- Language: English
- Series: Rachel Getty and Esa Khattak
- Genre: Crime fiction
- Published: Minotaur Books
- Publication date: January 13, 2015
- Publication place: Canada
- Media type: Novel
- ISBN: 1250055113
- Followed by: The Language of Secrests (2016), Among the Ruins (2017), A Death in Sarajevo (2017), A Dangerous Crossing (2018), A Deadly Divide (2019)

The Unquiet Dead is a 2015 novel by Canadian author Ausma Zehanat Khan. It is the first novel in the Rachel Ghetty and Esa Khattak series, and is followed by The Language of Secrets (2016), Among the Ruins (2017), A Death in Sarajevo (2017) (novella), A Dangerous Crossing (2018) and A Deadly Divide (2019). The novel follows Canadian detectives as they investigate the death of Christopher Drayton, which transforms into a complex portrayal of war crimes, grief and injustice. The Unquiet Dead was awarded the Arthur Ellis Award and Barry Award for "best first novel" in 2016, and was nominated for an Edgar Award.

== Content ==
=== Plot ===
Set in the Scarborough Bluffs, Toronto, the body of Christopher Drayton is found at the foot of the cliffs near his home. Esa Khattak, head of Community Policing has been called by his superior to investigate the incident, of which is presumed to be an unfortunate accident caused by walking through the unstable cliffs at night.

Esa and his headstrong partner Rachel Getty begin the investigation at Winterglass, the home of esteemed author Nathan (Nate) Clare. It becomes obvious to Rachel early on in their visit that Esa and Nate have known each other for years, yet the tension that fills the air leads her to believe that there is more to their relationship than meets the eye.

The two detectives then search Drayton’s home which is situated on the same street, finding a number of incriminating files and papers containing suspicious threats. There are a number of puzzles in the investigation, including Drayton’s relationship with Melanie Blessant and his planned donation to local museum Ringsong that specialises in Andulusian history.

From searching Drayton's home and researching into war crimes with the help of the Bosnian community, Khattak and Getty discover that Drayton was an alias for Serbian Drazen Kristic who oversaw the Srebrenican Genocide. Clues such as a tattoo of the Serbian cross, letters detailing the terrible crimes committed and a gun found in his home that was used by the Drina Corps, all led the detective pair to this conclusion. Tom Paley, Khattak's superior, wants Drayton's real identity to be kept a secret until they can find a way to reveal it to the Bosnian community of Toronto. After further investigations with the help of the community, they discover that many of the people involved in Ringsong are also Bosnian immigrants in disguise; they are aware of Drayton's true identity and are responsible for blackmailing the war criminal with letters and various other tools.

When this is uncovered, the detectives are forced to confront the verdict of the crime; is it a murder or suicide? Khan tackles the complex issue of justice and responsibility in relation to war crimes as well as the difficult topics of grief, suffering and genocide.

=== Major characters ===
Esa Khattak

The protagonist of the novel, Esa is the lead detective in the investigation of Christoper Drayton's death. As a second-generation Canadian Muslim, his superior Tom Paley thinks he will be a good fit for investigating the crime. Esa has complicated relationships with his old friend Nate and Mink Norman, who works in the museum, however his professionalism and strong relationship with Getty allows him to investigate thoroughly.

Rachel Getty

A determined and inquisitive detective, Rachel is Esa's partner and works alongside him in the investigation of Christoper Drayton's death. Despite their honest relationship, Getty struggles with Khattak's evasiveness in regard to his personal relationships with Nathan Clare and Mink Norman. Rachel's father is the infamous former police superintendent Don Getty, with whom she has a strained and complex bond with.

Nathan Clare

Famous author Nathan (Nate) is an estranged college friend of Esa's and lives in the same neighbourhood as Christoper Drayton. His connection with Ringsong allows Khattak and Getty to get inside the community find out the truth about Drayton's death.

Christopher Drayton

An alias for the war criminal Drazen Krstic, the investigation of Christopher Drayton's death forms the backbone of the novel. Khattak and Ghetty uncover that Drayton was a war criminal with ties to the Srebrenica Massacre of 1995, a crime that remains painful to the Bosnian community.

Melanie Blessant

Melanie Blessant is the fiancee of Christopher Drayton, who is a mother to two daughters, Hadley and Cassidy. She is an eccentric and passionate woman who the detectives believe has an ulterior motive for wanting to marry Drayton. She is the source of many issues within the investigation due to her demand for Drayton's will and poor care of her two daughters.

Mink Norman

Mink is the librarian of Ringsong, who also lives on the premises and dedicates her life to the study of Andalusian culture and history. She gains the respect and adoration of Inspector Khattak which causes tension between the detectives and within the investigation. At the end of the novel, we discover that Mink is also part of the Bosnian community and is related to others who were affected by the Srebrenica Massacre.

== Context ==
While The Unquiet Dead is a crime novel, its contents focus around the history of the Bosnian war and genocide. The Srebrenica Genocide forms the background for the crime investigation, with the character of Christopher Drayton (Drazen Krstic) representing Radislav Krstic, the Bosnian Serb war criminal.

The Bosnian War (1992-1995) was followed by the Srebrenica Genocide (1995), which saw the massacre of around 8000 Muslim Bosniaks. While mainly men and boys were killed, women and young girls were subject to rape by commanders and soldiers. The International Criminal Tribunal for the former Yugoslavia indicted 161 individuals for the genocide, of which Radislav Krstic became the first man to be convicted and sentenced to 46 years in prison. The struggle and trauma left within the Muslim Bosnian community is touched on in Khan's novel, which also deals with justice and punishment of war crimes.

== Reception ==
Khan's first novel has been widely praised in the media, with the LA times noting how it "transcends genre" and the Washington Post claiming it to be a "many-faceted gem".

The novel has won "best first novel" titles from the Arthur Ellis Awards and the Barry Awards in 2016. It was also nominated for an Edgar Award for first mystery.
