= Stuart McLean =

Canadian broadcaster and storyteller (1948–2017)

Stuart McLean OC
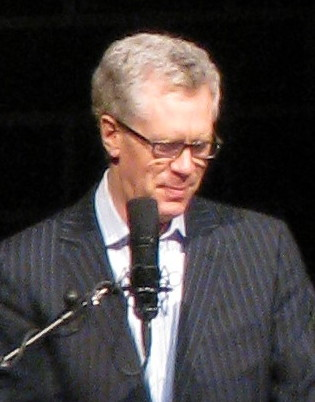
- McLean on stage at the Centennial Concert Hall in 2008
- Born: Andrew Stuart McLean; April 19, 1948; Montreal West, Quebec, Canada
- Died: February 15, 2017 (aged 68); Toronto, Ontario, Canada
- Education: Sir George Williams University
- Occupations: Radio broadcaster, writer, professor of journalism
- Years active: 1974-2017
- Employer: CBC Radio
- Notable work: The Vinyl Cafe
- Spouse: Linda Read (m. 1982; div. 2002)
- Awards: Officer of the Order of Canada

Andrew Stuart McLean, OC (April 19, 1948 – February 15, 2017) was a Canadian radio broadcaster, humorist, monologist, and author, best known as the host of the CBC Radio program The Vinyl Cafe. Often described as a "story-telling comic" although his stories addressed both humorous and serious themes, he was known for fiction and non-fiction work which celebrated the decency and dignity of ordinary people, through stories which often highlighted the ability of their subjects, whether real or fictional, to persevere with grace and humour through embarrassing or challenging situations.

== Personal life ==
McLean was born in Montreal West, the eldest of three children to Australian immigrant parents Andrew McLean and Margaret Godkin. McLean became interested in radio programming as a child, when his father bought him a Motorola radio to occupy his time while recovering from sickness. This fascination with radio stayed with McLean throughout his adult life as he pursued a career in media and journalism.

McLean was educated at Lower Canada College and Bishop's College School in Quebec. He admitted to feeling like an outsider to the other students at the private school, feeling neither athletic enough nor smart enough to fit in. McLean graduated from Sir George Williams University with a B.A. degree in 1971. Following his graduation, he worked in student services for Dawson College, and as campaign manager for Nick Auf der Maur in his first Montreal City Council election.

McLean married Linda Read, a potter, in 1982. They had two children together, Robert and Andrew, and McLean was stepfather to Read's son, Christopher Trowbridge, from her first marriage. McLean and Read later divorced in 2002.

He was also a sponsor of the YMCA's Camp Kanawana, establishing a charitable fund to provide financial support for underprivileged youth to attend the camp, and served as honorary colonel of the Canadian Armed Forces' 8 Air Maintenance Squadron at CFB Trenton.

== Media career ==
=== Early work ===
McLean first joined CBC Radio as a researcher for Cross Country Checkup in 1974, later becoming a documentarian for the radio program Sunday Morning. He won an ACTRA Award in 1979 for "Operation White Knight", his Sunday Morning documentary about the Jonestown Massacre. From 1981 until 1983 he was the show's executive producer.

McLean was a professor of journalism at Ryerson University from 1984 until 2004, when he retired and became a professor emeritus. When he died in 2017, former students of McLean recalled how he concerned himself with their success in the journalism industry. CTV reporter Scott Lightfoot remarked, "I went to university twice, I took a lot of courses, I never had another professor offer to make phone calls on my behalf."

During the 1980s and 1990s, he was a frequent contributor to and sometime guest host of Morningside, for which he often produced human interest documentaries and audio essays about everyday people and places. He would later characterize his Morningside work as celebrating "the importance of being unimportant", and as ultimately helping him find his own voice as a writer. Morningside host Peter Gzowski remembered fondly the work McLean did for the program: "On the surface, they seemed inconsequential, but in fact they were exquisitely crafted pieces of journalism."

McLean eventually compiled a selection of his work for Morningside in his first book, The Morningside World of Stuart McLean. The book was a Canadian bestseller and a finalist for the 1990 Toronto Book Awards. Following the success of his first book, McLean was approached by Penguin Books to write a travel memoir about life in small-town Canada. Released in 1992, Welcome Home: Travels in Smalltown Canada featured stories from seven small communities, and won the Canadian Authors Association for best non-fiction book in 1993.

McLean often reported for CBC news programs The Journal and The National, where he focused on human interest stories, talking to "regular people" and delving into their often funny or poignant experiences. These segments about everyday people helped to inspire The Vinyl Cafe, which in the same vein looked at the lives of average Canadians.

=== The Vinyl Cafe ===
In 1994, McLean launched The Vinyl Cafe as a summer series featuring stories about a fictional second-hand record store. Although the early stories focused on a diverse group of characters loosely linked through the titular Vinyl Cafe record store, by the time the series became a permanent one the stories were focused more squarely on the store's proprietor, Dave, and his family and friends. Following the show's second summer run in 1995, McLean published Stories from the Vinyl Cafe, his first book in that series. The show joined CBC's permanent regular-season schedule in 1997.

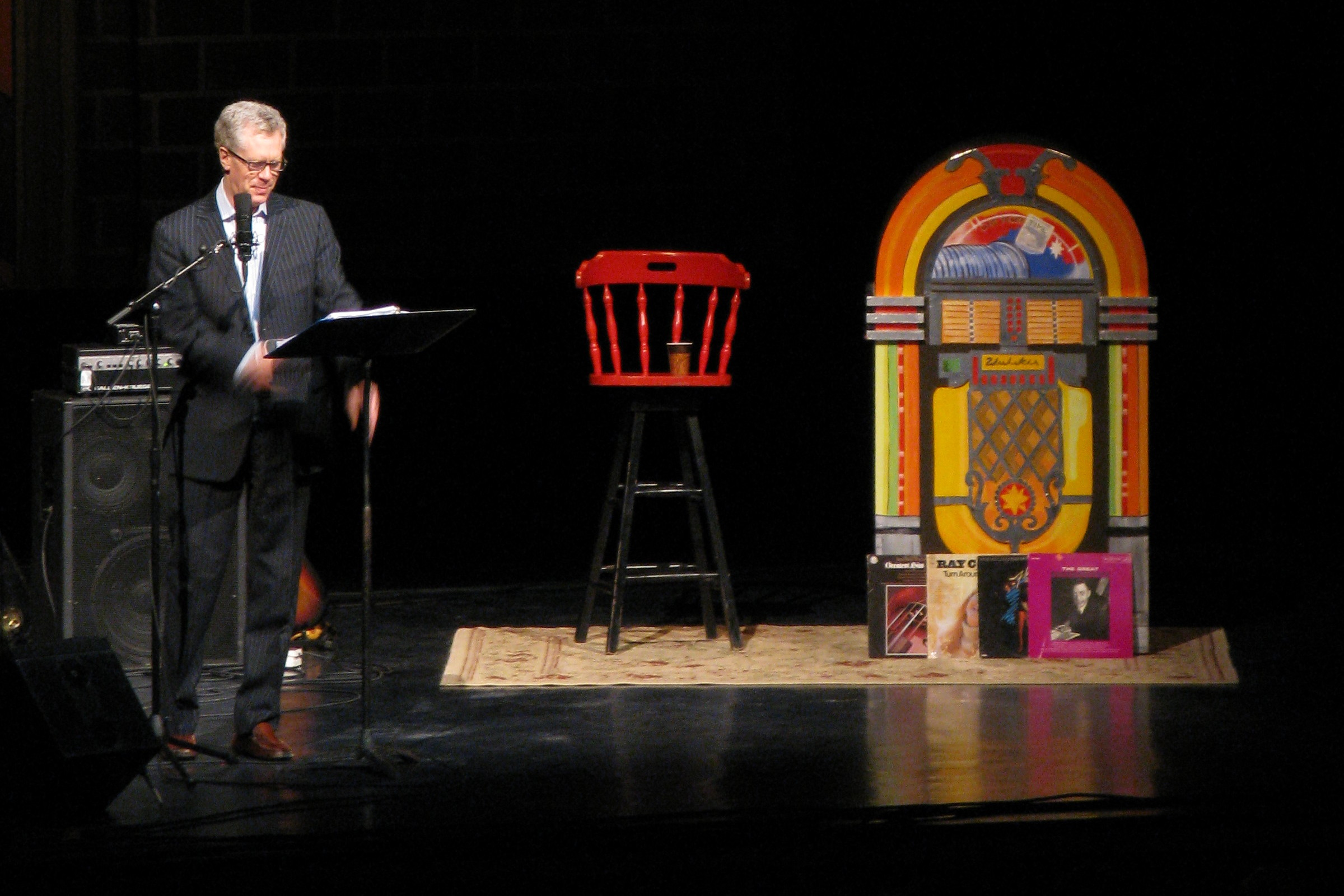
Stuart McLean on stage at the Centennial Concert Hall in Winnipeg, Manitoba

Beginning in 1998, McLean took The Vinyl Cafe on the road to theatres across Canada and the United States. Some stories would be repeated at multiple shows—in particular, an early story about Dave's awkward attempt to cook a turkey for Christmas dinner became one of the most famous and most frequently performed stories of McLean's career—but McLean would often perform slightly different versions of the stories to keep his audiences engaged. One episode of The Vinyl Cafe each year was also dedicated to the "Arthur Awards", McLean's own awards program to honour acts of kindness and community engagement by ordinary Canadians that might otherwise "go unheralded and even unnoticed".

The Vinyl Cafe was broadcast every weekend on CBC Radio, and later as a weekly podcast. McLean's books of stories from The Vinyl Cafe won the Stephen Leacock Memorial Medal for Humour three times. Several albums of his performances of Vinyl Cafe stories were also released. In the 2010s a spinoff edition, Vinyl Café Stories, aired on CBC Radio in a weekday afternoon time-slot, featuring two previously broadcast stories on interrelated themes.

== Cancer treatment and death ==
Following McLean's diagnosis with melanoma in November 2015, The Vinyl Cafe stopped touring and producing episodes. McLean announced on December 13, 2016, that he required a second round of treatment, meaning further delay in producing episodes, and that repeats of past shows would stop airing on CBC Radio One effective January 2017 to "make room for others to share their work on the radio." McLean died of cancer on February 15, 2017, in Toronto, aged 68. His archive was donated to McMaster University.

One day after his death in February 2017, a tribute special hosted by Michael Enright under the title Canada's Storyteller: A Tribute to Stuart McLean, aired on CBC Radio; it was repeated the following Sunday in The Vinyl Cafe's former timeslot. CBC Radio's documentary series The Doc Project produced a special episode after McLean's death, re-airing his 1979 Sunday Morning documentary "The New Goldrush", while Cross Country Checkup devoted a tribute episode to its own version of the Arthur Awards, asking callers to share stories of acts of kindness that had made a difference in their lives. In April 2018, Cross Country Checkup devoted a second episode to the question "Who would you nominate for Stuart McLean's Arthur Awards?"

== Works ==
=== Bibliography ===
- 1989 – The Morningside World of Stuart McLean
- 1992 – Welcome Home: Travels in Smalltown Canada
- 1995 – Stories from the Vinyl Cafe
- 1996 – When We Were Young: A Collection of Canadian Stories
- 1998 – Home from the Vinyl Cafe
- 2001 – Vinyl Cafe Unplugged
- 2003 – Vinyl Cafe Diaries
- 2005 – Stories from the Vinyl Cafe 10th Anniversary Edition
- 2006 – Secrets from the Vinyl Cafe
- 2006 – Dave Cooks the Turkey
- 2008 – When We Were Young: An Anthology of Canadian Stories
- 2009 – Extreme Vinyl Café
- 2010 – The Vinyl Cafe Notebooks
- 2012 – Revenge of The Vinyl Cafe
- 2013 – Time Now for the Vinyl Cafe Story Exchange
- 2015 – Vinyl Cafe Turns the Page
- 2017 – Christmas at The Vinyl Cafe
- 2021 – Vinyl Cafe Celebrates

=== Discography ===
- 1997 – Christmas Concert at the Vinyl Cafe (Audio Book CD)
- 1998 – Vinyl Cafe Stories
- 1999 – The Vinyl Cafe on Tour
- 2001 – Vinyl Cafe Odd Jobs
- 2002 – Vinyl Cafe Inc. Coast to Coast Story Service
- 2004 – A Story-Gram From Vinyl Cafe Inc.
- 2005 – Vinyl Cafe: A Christmas Collection
- 2006 – Stuart McLean's History of Canada
- 2007 – An Important Message From The Vinyl Cafe
- 2008 – Vinyl Cafe: Storyland
- 2009 – Vinyl Cafe Planet Boy
- 2010 – Vinyl Cafe: Out and About
- 2011 – Vinyl Cafe: Family Pack
- 2012 – Vinyl Cafe: The Christmas Pack
- 2013 – Vinyl Cafe: New Stories
- 2014 – Vinyl Cafe: The Auto Pack
- 2015 – Vinyl Cafe: Seasons
- 2016 – Vinyl Cafe: Up and Away
- 2017 - Vinyl Cafe: The Unreleased Stories

== Awards ==
- ACTRA Award for best radio documentary for coverage of the Jonestown Massacre (1979)
- Canadian Authors Association Best Non Fiction book for Welcome Home (1993)
- Rooke Fellowship for Excellence in Teaching, Research, and Writing: Trent University (1994–95)
- Stephen Leacock Memorial Medal for Humour, Home from the Vinyl Cafe (1999)
- Stephen Leacock Memorial Medal for Humour, Vinyl Cafe Unplugged (2001)
- Canadian Authors Association Jubilee Award, Vinyl Cafe Diaries (2004)
- Stephen Leacock Memorial Medal for Humour, Secrets from the Vinyl Cafe (2007)
- Officer of the Order of Canada, awarded in 2011 "for his contributions to Canadian culture as a storyteller and broadcaster, as well as for his many charitable activities".

== See also ==
- List of Dave and Morley stories
- List of Bishop's College School alumni
