= 8 Air Maintenance Squadron =

- Active: April 1, 1993 - Present
- Country: Canada
- Branch: Royal Canadian Air Force
- Type: Maintenance Squadron
- Size: Squadron
- Motto(s): Conjunctis Viribus (With Combined Powers)

Aircraft flown
- Transport: CC-130H Hercules, CC-130J Super Hercules, CC-150 Polaris, CC-177 Globemaster III

8 Air Maintenance Squadron is a Royal Canadian Air Force unit. Based at 8 Wing Trenton, it is responsible for supporting 424 Transport and Rescue Squadron, 436 Transport Squadron, 437 Transport Squadron, and 429 Transport Squadron, in their operational roles by performing second line maintenance on systems and components for the CC-130H, CC-130J, CC-150 and CC-177 aircraft respectively, as well as performing the "C-Check" preventive inspections on the CC-130J.

== Squadron history ==
No. 8 Air Maintenance Squadron (8 AMS) traces its roots back to the beginning of flying operations at CFB Trenton. However, it was not until April 1, 1993, that 8 AMS was formed as an element of 8 Wing.

Musician Sam Reid of Glass Tiger formerly served as the Honorary Colonel.

CBC radio broadcaster Stuart McLean also formerly served as Honorary Colonel of the squadron.
