= Ausma Zehanat Khan =

American-Canadian novelist

- Born: Leicester, England
- Occupation: Novelist
- Writing career
- Genres: Crime fiction, Fantasy fiction
- Notable awards: Arthur Ellis Award for Best First Novel, 2016; Barry Award for Best First Novel, 2016
- Website: ausmazehanatkhan.com

Ausma Zehanat Khan is an American-Canadian novelist and author of crime and fantasy novels.

== Biography ==
Khan holds a Ph.D. in International Human Rights Law with a research specialization in military intervention and war crimes in the Balkans. She received her LL.B. and LL.M. from the University of Ottawa, and her B.A. in English Literature and Sociology from the University of Toronto. She practiced immigration law in Toronto, and was an international human rights law professor at Northwestern University as well as a human rights and business law professor at York University. She has lived in the United States for fifteen years and resides in Denver, Colorado.

Khan was the editor-in-chief of Muslim Girl magazine from 2007 until the magazine's closure. Two documentaries were made about the publication, and it was featured in hundreds of national and international profiles and interviews including CNN International, Current TV, and Al Jazeera English's "Everywoman".

Khan published her first crime novel The Unquiet Dead in 2015; the book received "best first novel" accolades from both the Arthur Ellis Awards and the Barry Awards in 2016. The Washington Post'' wrote of the novel: "Throughout Getty and Khattak's solid and comprehensive investigation, Khan's talents are evident. This first in what may become a series is a many-faceted gem. It's a sound police procedural, a somber study of loss and redemption and, most of all, a grim effort to make sure that crimes against humanity are not forgotten." Kirkus Reviews wrote: "Khan's stunning debut is a poignant, elegantly written mystery laced with complex characters who force readers to join them in dealing with ugly truths." The novel also received a starred review in both Publishers Weekly and Library Journal.

In 2017, Khan published her fantasy debut, The Bloodprint (Harper Voyager), the first in The Khorasan Archives, a five-book epic fantasy series. The Bladebone, Book 5, will be published in October 2020.

In 2018, Khan's middle-grade non-fiction book Ramadan was published by Orca Books as part of its Origins series. It was selected as a Children's Book Council Notable Social Studies Trade Book for Young People 2019, as well as the Children's Literature Roundtable of Canada's 2019 Information Book Award Honour Book. It was also nominated for a Hackmatack Children's Choice Award.

In 2020, Khan's nonfiction essay "Origins and Destinations" was published by Seal Press in the crime fiction writers' anthology, Private Investigations (ed. Victoria Zackheim). Her short story "The Once and Future Qadi" will be forthcoming in the Sword Stone Table anthology, also in 2020.

In a 2018 interview with Nick Douglas, published in Life Hacker magazine, Khan described how she devoted more time to her writing as a novelist when she and her husband began moving more often, and it didn't seem worthwhile to get the qualification to practice law in a short-term home. She currently lives in Colorado.

== Works ==
=== Novels ===
==== Rachel Getty and Esa Khattak series ====
- The Unquiet Dead (2015)
- The Language of Secrets (2016)
- Among the Ruins (2017)
- A Death in Sarajevo (2017) (novella)
- A Dangerous Crossing (2018)
- A Deadly Divide (2019)

==== Khorasan Archives series ====
- The Bloodprint (2017)
- The Black Khan (2018)
- The Blue Eye (2019)
- The Bladebone (2020)

==== Detective Inaya Rahman series ====
- Blackwater Falls (2022)
- Blood Betrayal (2023)

=== Nonfiction ===
- Ramadan (2018)
- "Origins and Destinations", in Private Investigations (2020)

=== Short stories ===
- "The Once and Future Qadi", in Sword Stone Table (2020)

== Honors and awards ==
=== Awards ===
- Arthur Ellis Awards 2016 Best First Novel for The Unquiet Dead
- Barry Award (for crime novels) 2016 Best First Novel for The Unquiet Dead

=== Nominations ===
- Macavity Awards 2016 Best First Novel pour The Unquiet Dead
