= October 1913 =

Month in 1913

<<	October 1913					>>
Su	Mo	Tu	We	Th	Fr	Sa
			1	2	3	4
5	6	7	8	9	10	11
12	13	14	15	16	17	18
19	20	21	22	23	24	25
26	27	28	29	30	31

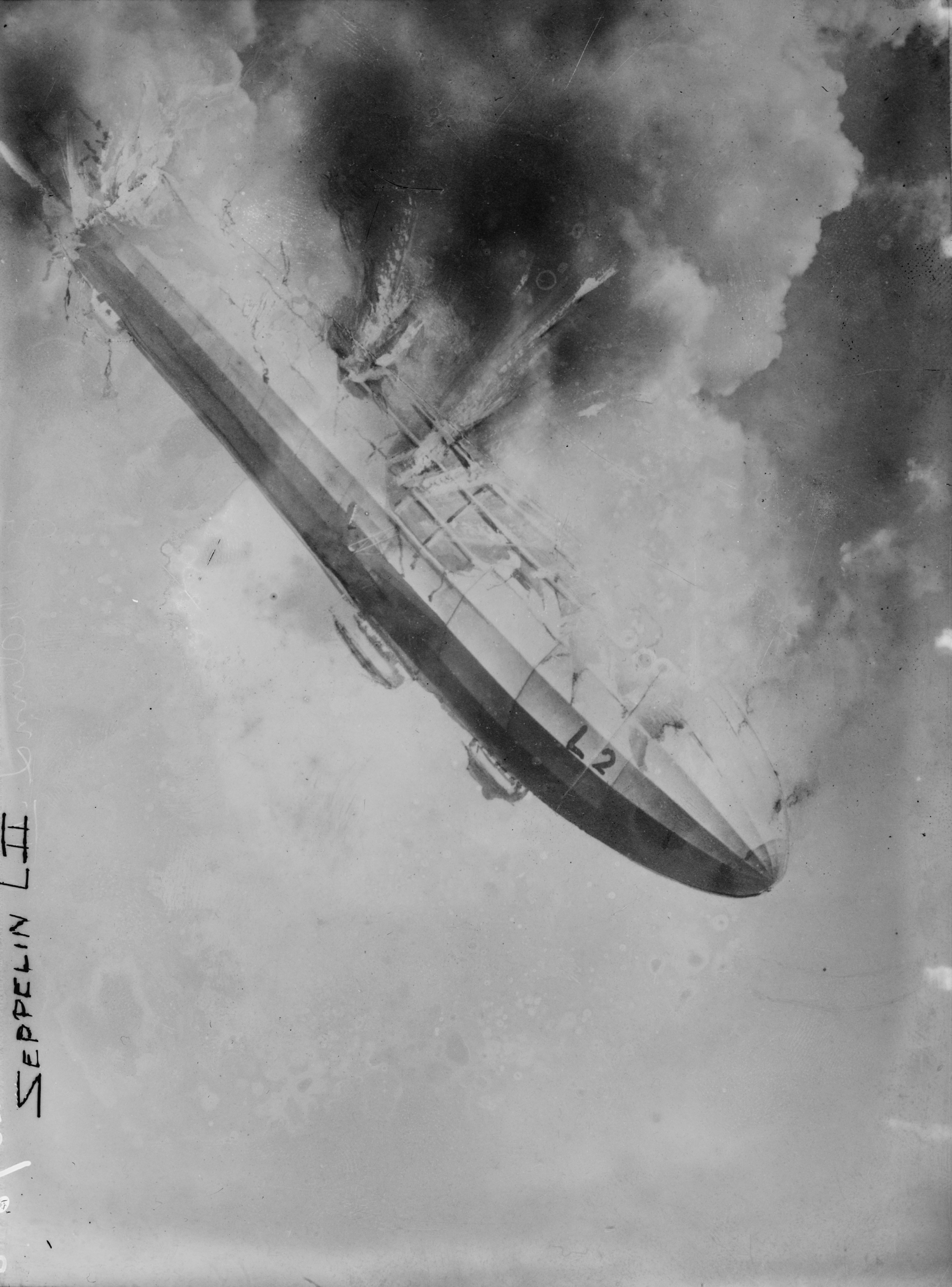
October 17, 1913: 28 people killed in deadliest air crash up to that time

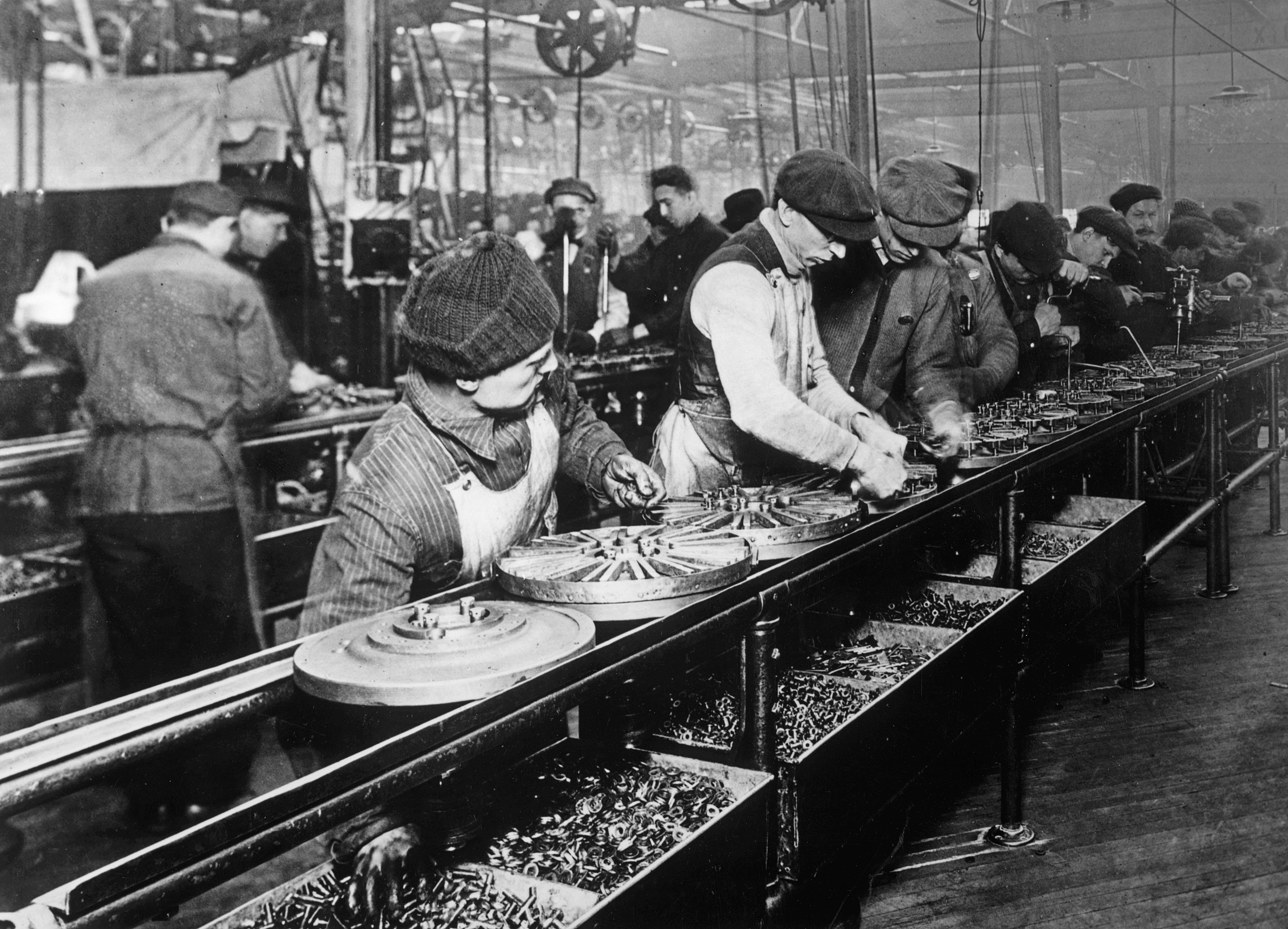
October 7, 1913: Ford Motor Company inaugurates its first moving assembly line

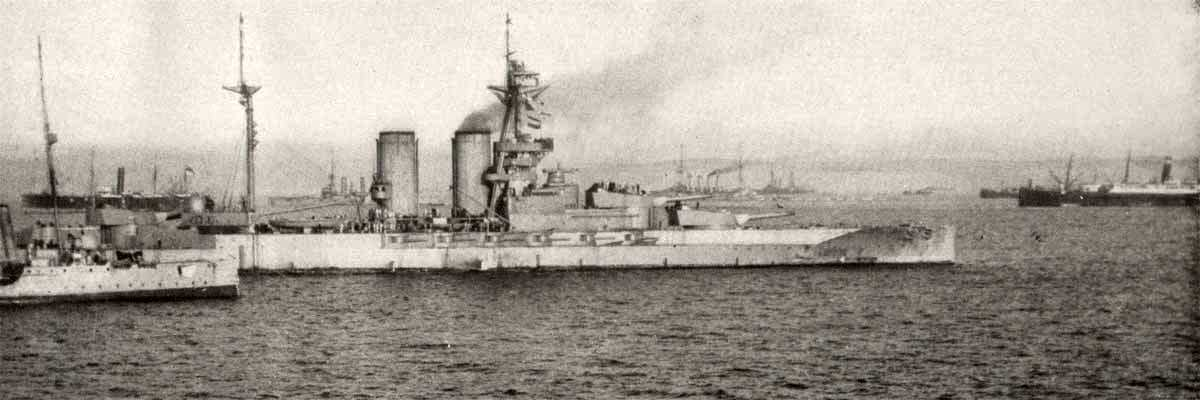
October 16, 1913: Royal Navy launches its first oil-powered warship, HMS Queen Elizabeth

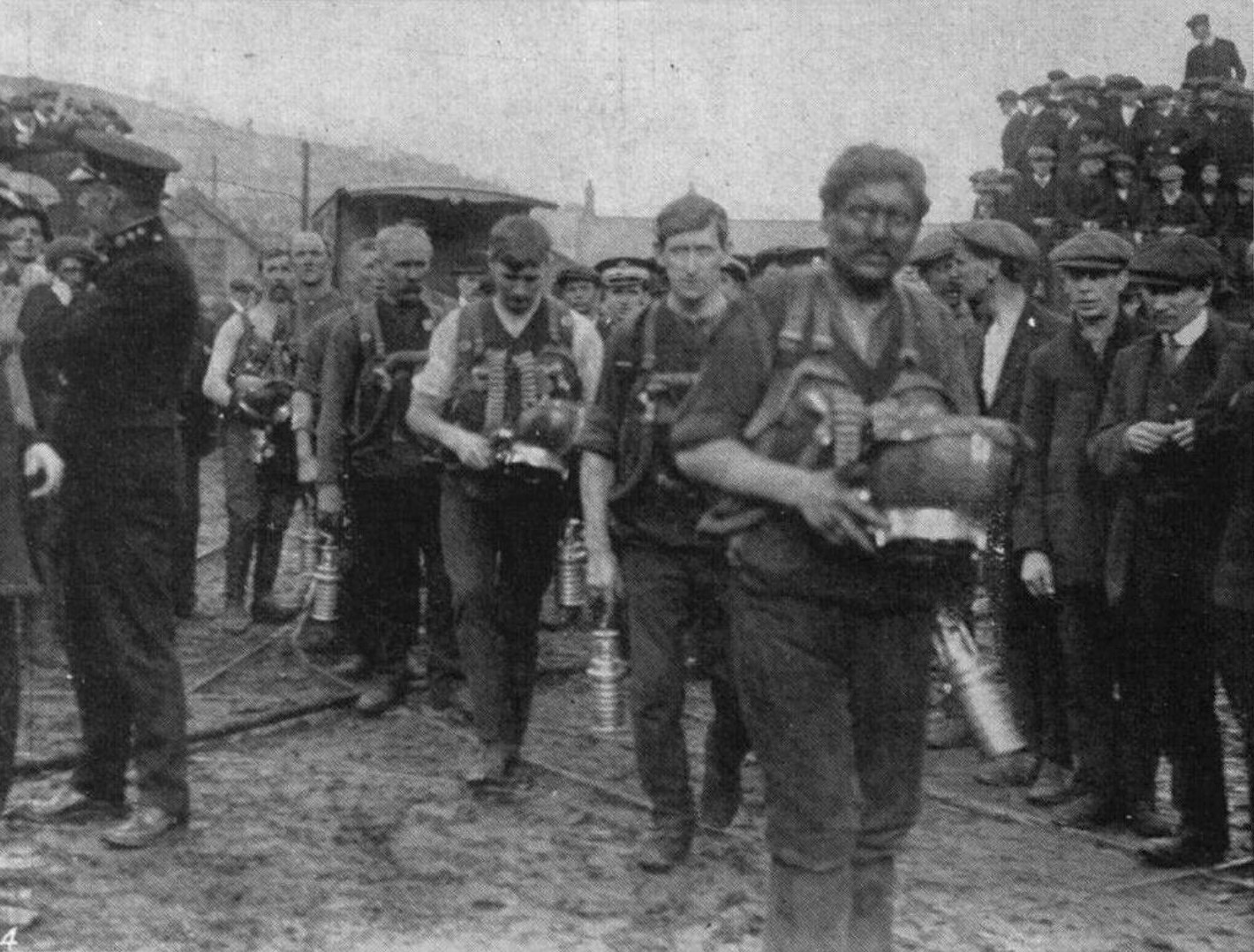
October 14, 1913: 439 coal miners killed in Wales, rescuers unable to find survivors inside

The following events occurred in October 1913

== October 1, 1913 (Wednesday) ==
- The Culebra Cut of the Panama Canal was completed near Gatún, Panama after nearly 32 years. Engineers from France had begun excavation on January 20, 1882, before halting the project, which was resumed later by American engineers. The structure include Gatun Dam, the largest embankment dam in the world at the time, which formed Gatun Lake, then the largest artificial lake ever created.
- English singer and actress Marie Lloyd and her lover, Bernard Dillon, were arrested by the U.S. immigration authorities on their arrival in New York City when it was discovered that they were not married.
- A series of rail stations opened across England and Wales including:
  - Darras in Newcastle upon Tyne to serve the Ponteland Railway;
  - Eydon to serve the Great Central Main Line in England;
  - Gillett's Crossing in Lancashire to serve the Fylde Coast rail line;
  - Wolf's Castle in Pembrokeshire to serve the Clarbeston Road and Letterston Railway.
- Joseph F. Smith, President of the Church of Jesus Christ of Latter-day Saints, unveiled the Seagull Monument in front of the Salt Lake Assembly Hall in Salt Lake City. The monument was inspired by a miraculous event in 1848 where a Mormon settler harvest was saved from locusts by a flocks of seagulls.
- The symphonic composition Falstaff, composed by Edward Elgar and based on the Shakespearean character, premiered at the Leeds music festival.
- Born: Hélio Gracie, Brazilian martial artist, author of Gracie Jiu-Jitsu, developed Brazilian jiu-jitsu with brother Carlos Gracie; in Belém, Brazil (d. 2009)
- Died: Eugene O'Keefe, 85, Canadian business leader, philanthropist, and founder of the O'Keefe Brewery Company (b. 1827)

== October 2, 1913 (Thursday) ==
- China's National Assembly passed a law limiting the President of China to a five-year term of office, with only one re-election.
- Flooding in Southern Texas caused $50,000,000 of property damage, though only 12 lives were lost.
- The Mexican city of Torreón fell to rebel invaders, led by Pancho Villa, a day after Mexican federal troops evacuated the area.
- Scottish murderer Patrick Higgins was hanged after being convicted of the November 1911 murder of his two sons, based on forensic evidence developed by Sydney Smith. Higgins, a habitual drinker, had admitted to the killings but had raised the defense of "insanity caused by epilepsy". This was disproved by analysis and testimony from Smith.
- Well-known American author Ambrose Bierce decided, at the age of 71, that he wanted to conclude his life by leaving his Washington, D.C., home to participate in the Mexican Revolution, departing by train after writing to his niece that "being stood up against a Mexican stone wall and shot to rags... beats old age, disease, or falling down the cellar stairs." After reaching Mexico and sending a letter from Chihuahua City on December 26, Bierce vanished "without a trace."
- The State Bank of Mysore was established in Bangalore, India.
- Born: Roma Mitchell, Australian politician and judge, first woman to serve as a judge in Australia and as a Governor of an Australian state, Governor of South Australia from 1991-1996; in Adelaide, Australia (d. 2000)

== October 3, 1913 (Friday) ==
- At 9:10 p.m., U.S. President Woodrow Wilson signed into law the Revenue Act, also known as the Underwood–Simmons Tariff Act, dropping or reducing many of the tariffs of the United States. An amendment to the bill also provided the first federal income tax authorized by the Sixteenth Amendment to the United States Constitution, though the initial rates were modest in comparison to the lowered cost of living provided by the tariff elimination. The charges on imported meats, fish, dairy products, flour and potatoes were eliminated, as well as those for coal, iron ore and lumber from abroad, and farm machinery and office machinery made outside the United States. On the average the tariff rate was reduced from 37 percent to 27 percent. Wilson said afterwards, "We have set the business of this country free from those conditions which have made monopoly not only possible, but, in a sense, easy and natural." The U.S. Senate had approved the bill, 36–17, the day before, and the House of Representatives had voted, 254–103, in its favor on September 30.
- The government of Austria-Hungary passed a bill increasing the size of its army to 600,000 men and authorizing an army of 2,000,000 men in the event of war. The war against Serbia, less than nine months later, would escalate into World War I.
- The Allentown State Hospital was opened in Allentown, Pennsylvania as the Allentown Homeopathic Hospital for the Insane, which primarily served residents of Lehigh, Northampton, Carbon, Monroe, and Pike counties. The hospital was closed in 2010 and was fully demolished in 2021.
- Died: Paul Preuss, 27, Austrian mountaineer, was killed in a climbing accident on the North Ridge of the Mandlkogel in the Gosaukamm.

== October 4, 1913 (Saturday) ==
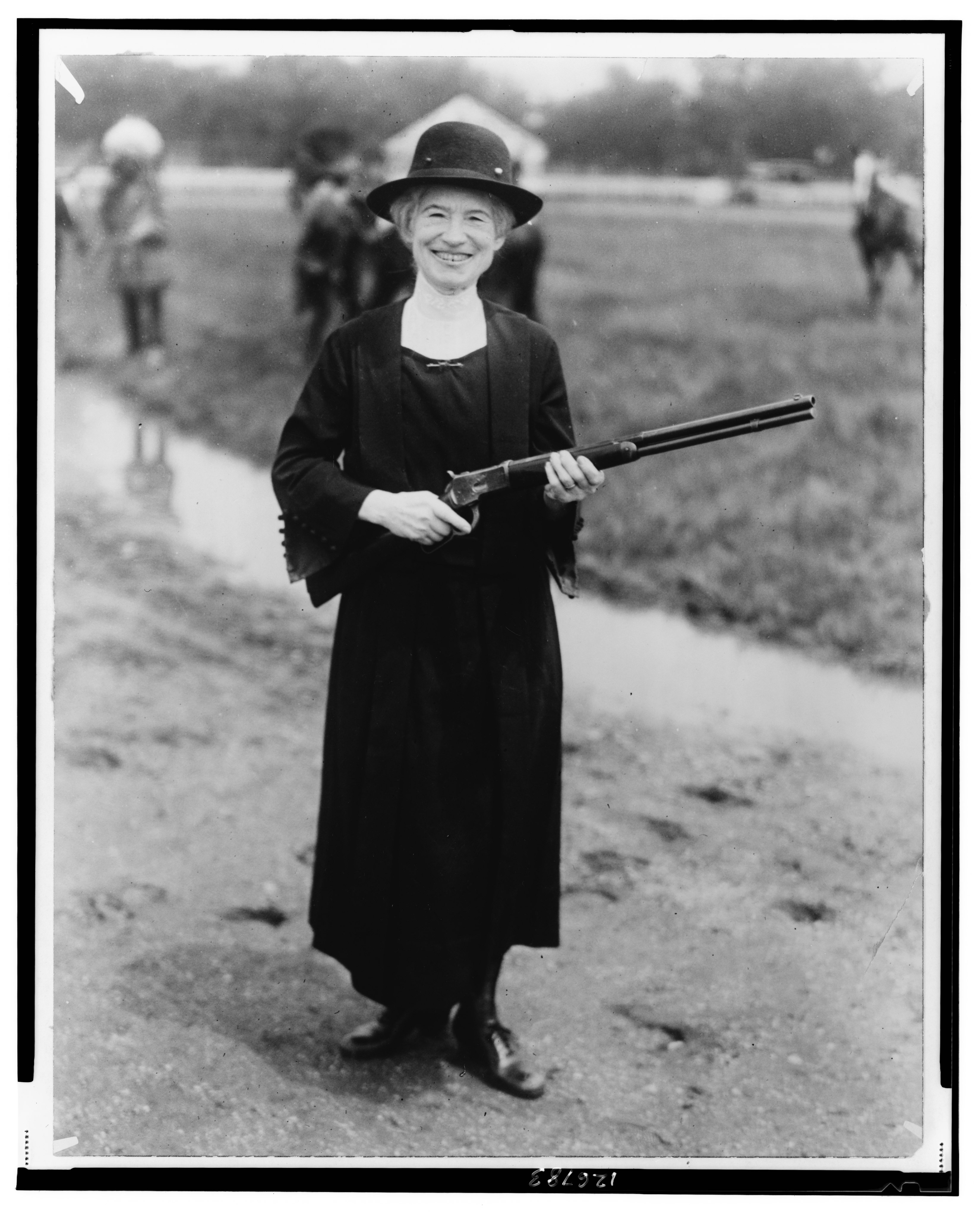
Sharpshooter Annie Oakley in 1922

- Oregon, though it was the second of American state to pass an authorization for a minimum wage law (after Massachusetts), became the first state to have orders implementing a wage, beginning with a regulation for girls between the ages of 16 and 18 who had worked at least one year and who were working the maximum 54 hours per week; the $8.25 for the 54 hour week was equivalent to slightly more than 15 cents per hour. Later rules would extend coverage to experienced adult women in Portland (November 23) and to all women, regardless of experience (February 7).
- The new site of the National Museum of Bosnia and Herzegovina opened to the public in Sarajevo.
- At Marion, Illinois, legendary sharpshooter Annie Oakley gave the last public performance of her shooting skills. Buffalo Bill's Wild West Show, where Oakley had been a major star, had gone bankrupt earlier in the year.
- Survivalist Joseph Knowles, who had gone into the forests of Maine on August 4 without clothing, food or tools, emerged after completing his two-month experiment. Not only had he survived, but he had fashioned "a bearskin robe, deerskin moccasins, and a knife, bow and arrows" from the materials in the wilderness.
- Mexican rebel leader Emiliano Zapata issued a widely circulated order to his troops, commanding them that "under no pretext nor for any personal cause should crimes be committed against lives and properties". Officers were directed to punish any soldiers who violated the order, or to face court-martial themselves.
- Born: Martial Célestin, first Prime Minister of Haiti (in 1988); in Ganthier, Haiti (d. 2011)
- Died: Faisal bin Turki, 49, Sultan of Muscat and Oman within the Ottoman Empire since 1888 (b. 1864)

== October 5, 1913 (Sunday) ==
- Taimur bin Feisal became the new Sultan of Oman. He would abdicate on February 10, 1932, in favor of his son, Said bin Taimur, who would become the new Sultan.
- Henry Spencer was arrested by Chicago police for the murder of Mildred Rexroat nine days earlier. Spencer confessed to her murder, then told police that he had killed 13 other people over the years.
- The University of Manila was established in Manila, Philippines.
- The association football club Associação Atlética Internacional was established in Limeira, Brazil.
- Atotxa Stadium opened in San Sebastián, Spain as the home ground for Real Sociedad. It was replaced in 1993 by Anoeta Stadium.
- Born:
  - Eugene B. Fluckey, American naval officer, Medal of Honor recipient and U.S. Navy submarine commander; in Washington, D.C., United States (d. 2007)
  - Dan Smoot, American activist, advocate of the influence of communism in various public and government institutions; as Howard Smoot, in East Prairie, Missouri, United States (d. 2003)
  - Jack Mullin, American audio engineer, inventor of high fidelity (hi-fi) recordings by magnetic tape; as John Mullin, in San Francisco, United States (d. 1999)
  - Ken Weeks, Australian supercentenarian, oldest living person in Australia and the oldest verified man in Australian history; in Grafton, New South Wales
- Died: Hans von Bartels, 56, German painter and member of the Düsseldorf school of painting (b. 1856)

== October 6, 1913 (Monday) ==
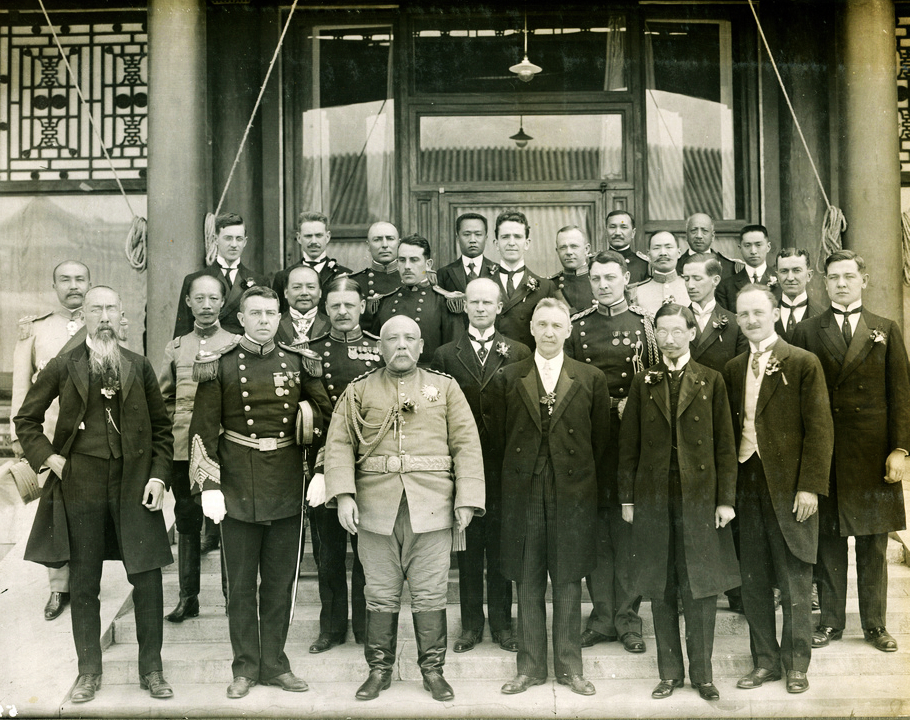
President Yuan receiving dignitaries

- Barely receiving the two-thirds majority required, Yuan Shikai was formally elected by the National Assembly after three rounds of voting, to a five-year term as the President of China. A total of 759 of the 850 Chinese Senators and Representatives participated in Beijing. With a candidate needing 506 votes, Yuan received 507 on the third ballot. Li Yuan-Heng, who had already said that he would not be a candidate for the office, received 179 votes, while the other legislators abstained. The votes for Yan and Li were 471–153 on the first round, and 497–162 on the second. After the second round, a mob of Yuan's supporters surrounded the legislative building and blocked the exits. Li was elected vice-president the next day. President Yuan would dissolve the legislature four weeks later and assume dictatorial powers, then proclaim himself the Emperor.
- Chicago became the first major American city to pass a resolution declaring the immorality of the tango, a dance which had recently become popular in the United States after originating in Argentina. The tango differed from acceptable dances because of the contact between the upper thighs of the dancers.
- At his inauguration as the new American Governor-General of the Philippines, Francis Burton Harrison delivered a promise, from U.S. President Woodrow Wilson, that Filipinos would be granted a majority of the seats on the Philippine Commission, the appointed group that had to approve bills passed by the Philippine legislature.
- Heavy rains killed more than 600 people in the Bosphorous straits around Istanbul.
- Born:
  - Inga Arvad, Danish-American journalist, known for her romantic relationship with U.S. President John F. Kennedy; as Inga Maria Arvad Petersen, in Copenhagen, Denmark (d. 1973)
  - Alfred Harvey, American comic book publisher, founder of Harvey Comics; as Alfred Harvey Wiernikoff, in New York City, United States (d. 1994)

== October 7, 1913 (Tuesday) ==
- The Ford Motor Company factory in Highland Park, Michigan, began use of the moving assembly line to manufacture its Model T automobiles. With 140 assemblers, each assigned a different task, the time to produce a single car was cut by more than half, from 12 1/2 hours to 5 1/2 hours.
- The Maryland Supreme Court struck down Baltimore's recently passed ordinance requiring segregation of neighborhoods and its retroactive application, which would have forced families to move.
- The Government House opened in Edmonton as the official residence of the Lieutenant Governors of Alberta. The building was sold in 1938 and used privately until it was returned to the Government of Alberta in 1964. It was added to the National Historic Sites of Canada in 2012.
- A rail station was opened in Tailem Bend to serve the Adelaide-Wolseley railway line in South Australia, Australia.
- Died: Benjamin Altman, 73, American entrepreneur and art collector, founder of the B. Altman and Company department store who later donated his large collection to the Metropolitan Museum of Art (b. 1840)

== October 8, 1913 (Wednesday) ==
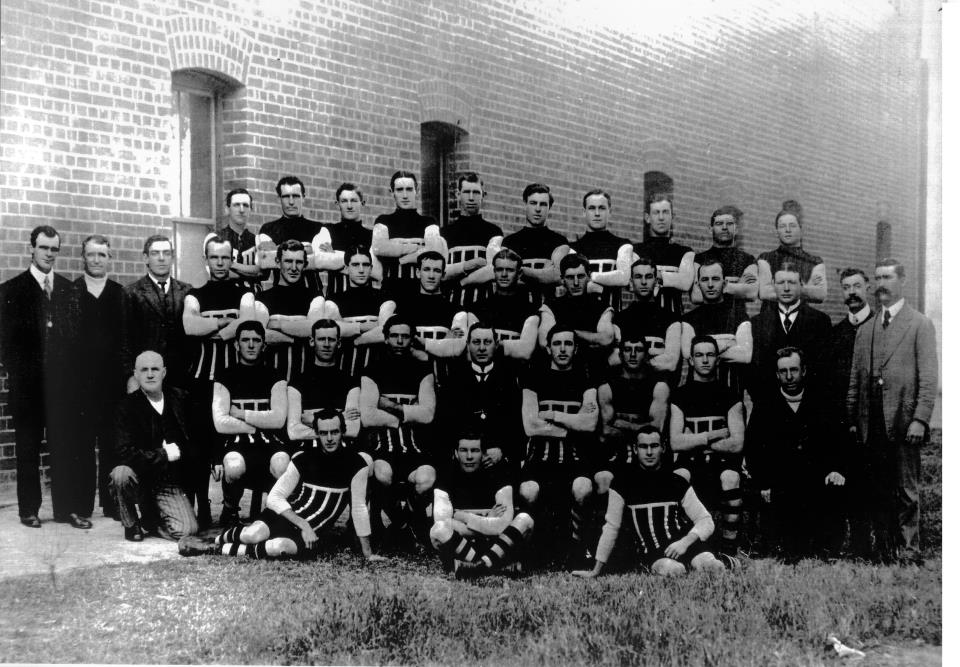
Australian championship winner Port Adelaide

- The champions of the two major leagues of Australian rules football met to decide the national championship. The Port Adelaide Magpies (of the South Australian Football League) hosted the Fitzroy Lions of the Victorian Football League. Port Adelaide, with 13 six-point goals, and 16 one-point behinds, won 94–31 over Fitzroy.
- The University of South Wales was founded as the South Wales and Monmouthshire School of Mines, located at Treforest in South Wales in the United Kingdom, with a class of 17 students. In 1949, it would become Glamorgan Technical College, and, in 1975, Polytechnic of Wales, before becoming the University of Glamorgan in 1992. On April 11, 2013, the University of Wales, Newport would be merged with the University of Glamorgan to create USW, located at the Treforest campus.
- Portions of the comic opera The Fair at Sorochyntsi by composer Modest Mussorgsky premiered in Moscow, decades after his death, under the direction of Konstantin Saradzhev. A completed version would premiere in Saint Petersburg in 1917.
- Born:
  - Solveig Gunbjørg Jacobsen, the first person to be born on the island of South Georgia, and at the time, the person born closest to the South Pole; in Grytviken, South Georgia (d. 1996)
  - Marios Makrionitis, Greek Roman Catholic priest, member of the Jesuit Order, Archbishop of Athens from 1953 to 1959; in Vari, Greece (d. 1959)

== October 9, 1913 (Thursday) ==
- The passenger ship SS Volturno, operated by the Uranium Line, caught fire while crossing the Atlantic Ocean. Although 125 passengers and crew died while trying to evacuate, the other 532 people were rescued by ten other steamers that traveled to the rescue after hearing the S.O.S. signal by wireless telegraph, Popular Mechanics magazine would observe in its next issue that "The day of the 'mystery of the sea,' when a vessel might sail from port and never be heard from again, is past."
- The Russian Arctic Expedition arrived at St. Michael, Alaska, and delivered the first reports of the discovery of the previously unknown land mass which they had named Nicholas II Land (Zemlya Imperatova Nikolaya II). The area is now called Severnaya Zemlya (literally "Northern Land").
- Born: George M. Foster, American anthropologist, pioneer of medical anthropology; in Sioux Falls, South Dakota, United States (d. 2006)
- Died: Robinson Ellis, 76, British academic, described as "the greatest of English Latinists" (b. 1834)

== October 10, 1913 (Friday) ==
- U.S. President Woodrow Wilson pressed a telegraph key at his desk in the White House, sending the electrical charge that ignited dynamite to destroy the Gamboa Dike, thereby completing the Panama Canal between the Atlantic and Pacific Oceans. There was no ceremony; after Wilson pressed the button at 2:00 p.m., he said, "There, it is all over. Gamboa is busted."
- Sixteen days before the legislative and presidential elections scheduled for October 26, Mexico's President Victoriano Huerta ordered the arrest of 110 members of the Chamber of Deputies. Soldiers of the Mexican Army surrounded the legislative building, then marched in to arrest the legislators, who had signed a resolution protesting the disappearance of Senator Belisario Dominguez. Seventy-four of the legislators were later charged with conspiring to overthrow the Huerta government.
- At the inauguration ceremony for China's president Yuan Shikai, the Chief of Beijing's mounted police was arrested and charged with plotting to assassinate Yuan. Police Chief Chen, who confessed that he had been bribed by leaders of the Southern provinces rebellion, had aroused suspicion because of his persistence in trying to be near President Yuan during the ceremony, and several bombs were found at Chief Chen's home.
- The body of Rudolf Diesel, inventor of the diesel engine, was found floating in the sea, 11 days after his September 28 disappearance from the passenger liner SS Dresden. The crew of the steamer Coertsen, from Belgium, found the body, which was identified by the items Diesel had been carrying.
- French composer Erik Satie produced the first in a series of piano compositions for beginners titled Enfantines.
- Born: Claude Simon, French novelist, recipient of the Nobel Prize in Literature, author of Triptyque and L'Acacia; in Tananarive, French Madagascar (present-day Madagascar) (d. 2005)
- Died:
  - Katsura Tarō, 65,Prime Minister of Japan 1901-1906, 1908-1911 and 1912-1913 (b. 1848)
  - Adolphus Busch, 74, German-born American business leader, co-founder of the Anheuser-Busch brewing company (b. 1839)

== October 11, 1913 (Saturday) ==
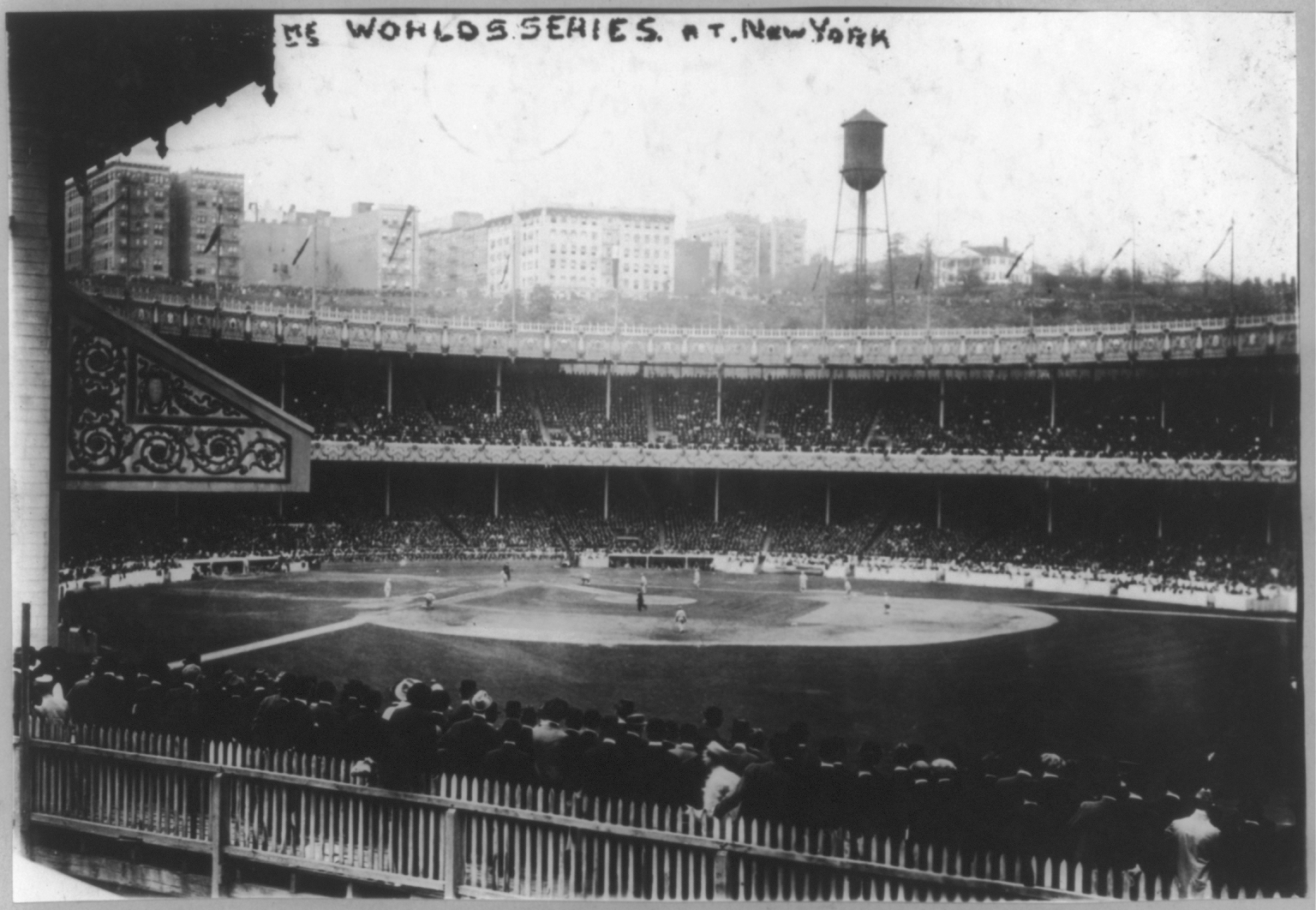
Athletics vs. Giants at the Polo Grounds

- The Philadelphia Athletics won the deciding game of the World Series over baseball's New York Giants, winning 3–1 to take the series in five games.
- The day after President Victoriano Huerta dissolved parliament in Mexico, Britain's Sir Lionel Carden greeted the President as the new British Minister to Mexico, which the United States inferred to be a British attempt to gain Huerta's alliance.
- Mayor of Boston John F. Fitzgerald issued an order banning the tango, the turkey trot, "and other dances of a similar character." The order required that "a matron and a policeman must stand guard in every public dance hall in Boston" to break up any attempts at the controversial dances, and pledged to revoke the license of any dance hall that failed to observe the rules.
- Franz Rosenzweig, preparing to convert from Judaism to Christianity, decided at the last moment to reaffirm his Jewish faith. Rosenzweig would go on to become an Orthodox Jewish philosopher whose most famous work was The Star of Redemption.
- Born:
  - Joe Simon, American comic book writer, co-created with artist Jack Kirby the character of Captain America; as Hymie Simon, in Rochester, New York, United States (d. 2011)
  - John T. Parsons, American computer scientist who pioneered numerical control for machinery; in Detroit, United States (d. 2007)
  - J. J. Pickle, American politician, U.S. Representative for Texas from 1963 to 1995; as James Jarrell Pickle, in Roscoe, Texas, United States (d. 2005)

== October 12, 1913 (Sunday) ==
- The lineups were announced for an unprecedented round for the world tour to be made by baseball's Chicago White Sox and New York Giants, managed, respectively, by Charles Comiskey and John McGraw. The two teams, which included stars from other major league clubs, would begin their westward journey on October 18 with a game in Cincinnati, then set sail for Tokyo on November 19 and would return in March after playing exhibition games in ten foreign nations.
- German composer Max Reger premiered his poetic composition Vier Tondichtungen nach A. Böcklin with the Städtisches Orchestra in Essen, Germany.
- The association football club Sergipe was established in Propriá, Brazil. It was renamed Propriá in 1956.
- The sports club Talleres de Córdoba was established in Córdoba, Argentina. It is known for its association football and field hockey programs.
- Born: Leo Fleider, Polish-born Argentine film director, known for films including Amor a primera vista; in Hermanowa, Austria-Hungary (present-day Poland) (d. 1977)

== October 13, 1913 (Monday) ==
- American aviator Albert Jewell, who had planned to participate in the "American Aerial Derby", sponsored by The New York Times, disappeared after taking off from Hempstead on New York's Long Island, on a short flight to Staten Island, from which the race was to start. Despite an extensive search, no trace of Jewell, nor his Blériot XI airplane, were ever found.
- Baron Alverstone resigned the office of Lord Chief Justice of the United Kingdom.
- The soccer football club Rio Branco was established in Paranaguá, Brazil.
- Died: Leonid Sobolev, 69, Russian General, later Prime Minister of Bulgaria from 1882-1883 (b. 1844)

== October 14, 1913 (Tuesday) ==
- In the worst mining disaster in British history, 439 coal miners were killed in the explosion of the Universal Colliery at Senghenydd, Wales. At 6:00 a.m., 935 miners went underground into the pits, designated "Lancaster" and "York." Two hours later, there was an explosion in the Lancaster pit. There were 498 survivors. After 74 bodies had been removed and no survivors located by rescuers, the decision was made to leave the other 345 entombed in the mine.
- British Prime Minister H. H. Asquith and Leader of the Opposition Bonar Law met secretly to discuss a bipartisan solution to the growing demand for Home Rule in Ireland. From their meetings, there would emerge the eventual separation of the mostly Protestant counties, in Northern Ireland, from the mostly Roman Catholic counties in the rest of the island.
- U.S. President Woodrow Wilson notified Mexican President Victoriano Huerta that the United States would not recognize the legitimacy of the results of the October 26 elections.
- Edward Steininger, the owner of the St. Louis Terriers franchise in baseball's newly formed Federal League, announced that "We are going to invade the majors and we will take some of their players, too", beginning with the National League's St. Louis Cardinals and the American League's St. Louis Browns.
- The Metropolitan Museum of Art in New York City was announced as the recipient of the $10,000,000 art collection of late business leader Benjamin Altman, who had died on October 7.

== October 15, 1913 (Wednesday) ==
- Four natives of the Philippines were appointed by U.S. President Woodrow Wilson to the Philippine Commission, giving Filipinos a majority (five of nine) on the governing commission for the first time.
- China's President Yuan Shikai ordered the arrest of a list of his opponents, including former president Sun Yat-sen, Huang Hsing and Chang Chi.

== October 16, 1913 (Thursday) ==
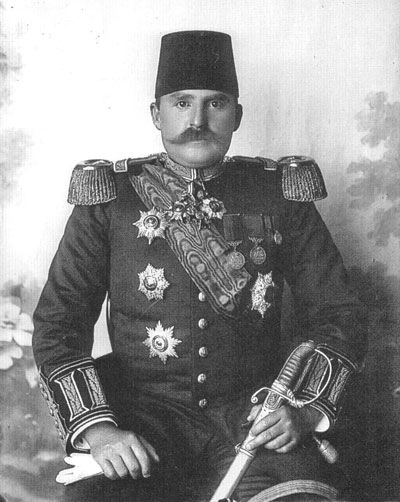
Central Albanian President Essad Pasha Toptani

- The Republic of Central Albania was proclaimed by politician Essad Pasha Toptani, who installed himself as president with his capital at Durrës. Toptani, a rival of Albanian leader Ismail Qemali, disbanded the government three months later under pressure from the leaders of the Great Powers nations, shortly before the outbreak of World War I.
- The New York State Senate voted 43–12 to convict Governor William Sulzer on three of the eight counts of impeachment against him, removing him permanently from office. Lieutenant-Governor Martin H. Glynn, who had served as acting governor since the impeachment was voted in September, was sworn in as Governor of New York.
- The British battleship HMS Queen Elizabeth, the first to use oil, rather than coal, for its fuel, was launched from Portsmouth. The new generation of British battleship had ten 15-inch guns. After service during both world wars, the ship would be dismantled in 1948.
- The Booth Theatre opened on Broadway in New York City as a companion to the Shubert Theatre.
- The play Pygmalion, by George Bernard Shaw, was performed for the first time, albeit in the German language, at the Burgtheater in Vienna. The play, which would later become the basis for the musical My Fair Lady, would premiere in London on April 11, 1914.
- Died: Ralph Rose, 28, American athlete, holder of the world record for distance in the shot put, and Olympic gold medalist in 1904, 1908 and 1912, died of typhoid fever (b. 1885)

== October 17, 1913 (Friday) ==
- In the worst air disaster up to that date, German zeppelin L-2 exploded in mid-air, 600 feet over the city of Johannisthal, Germany, killing all 28 passengers and crew on board.
- Born: Robert Lowery, American television actor, second to portray Batman in the serial Batman and Robin; as Robert Lowery Hanks, in Kansas City, Missouri, United States (d. 1971)
- Died: George Orby Wombwell, 80, British army officer, last of the surviving British officers in the Charge of the Light Brigade (b. 1832)

== October 18, 1913 (Saturday) ==
- Austria-Hungary, acting on its own without consultation with the other "Great Powers," delivered an ultimatum to the Kingdom of Serbia, demanding that Serbian troops be withdrawn within eight days from the territory set aside for Albania by the Great Powers. The Serbians withdrew on October 25, but the unilateral action of the Austrian Emperor began the breakup of the Great Powers.
- Kaiser Wilhelm II inaugurated the Monument to the Battle of the Nations in Leipzig. Designed by Bruno Schmitz, the monument commemorated the 1813 Napoleonic Battle of Leipzig.
- The musical The Girl from Utah, composed by Paul Rubens and Sidney Jones, debuted at the Adelphi Theatre in London for a run of 195 performances.
- Russian composer Sergei Rachmaninoff premiered his composition Piano Sonata No. 2 in Kursk, Russia.
- Born: Evelyn Venable, American actress, model and voice for the Blue Fairy in the Walt Disney animated film Pinocchio; in Cincinnati, United States (d. 1993)
- Died: Dinuzulu, 45, king of the Zulu nation from 1884 to 1913 (b. 1868)

== October 19, 1913 (Sunday) ==
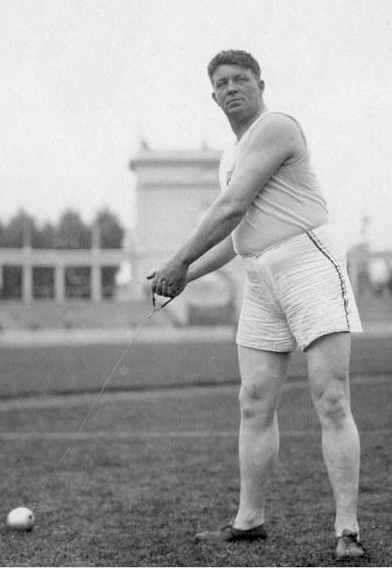
Hammer thrower Patrick Ryan at the 1920 Olympics

- Twenty United States Army soldiers were killed and another 102 were injured when the train they were riding on fell while crossing a high trestle over the Buckatunna river, near State Line, Mississippi.
- Patrick Ryan set a world record for the 12-pound hammer throw, hurling the item 213 feet (65 m) and breaking the record of 207 feet 7 3/4 inches (63.290 meters), set by John Flanagan on October 24, 1910.
- Arthur Zimmermann, the Deputy Foreign Minister of Germany, told the British Ambassador to Berlin, Edward Goschen, that the Germans had been surprised by Austria-Hungary's ultimatum as a policy that "might lead to serious consequences," but, according to Goschen, added that "restraining advice at Vienna on the part of Germany was out of the question." Historian Martin Gilbert would write years later that "In these final fourteen words lay the seeds of a European war."
- Born:
  - Dean S. Tarbell, American chemist, known for his research into chemical warfare agents; in Hancock, New Hampshire, United States (d. 1999)
  - Vinicius de Moraes, Brazilian poet and composer, leading figure of modernism in Brazil, known for stage musicals including Orfeu da Conceição and bossa nova albums such as Os Afro-sambas; as Marcus Vinícius da Cruz e Mello Moraes, in Rio de Janeiro, Brazil (d. 1980)
- Died: Charles Tellier, French engineer, inventor of the cold storage process (b. 1828)

== October 20, 1913 (Monday) ==
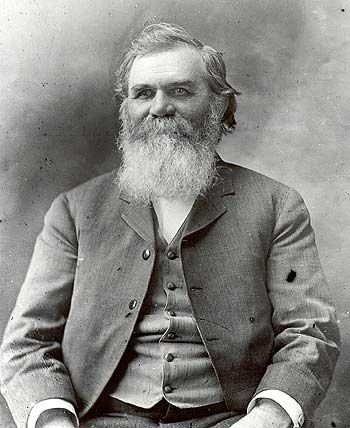
Daniel David Palmer, founder of chiropractic medicine

- Rufus Isaacs was appointed as the new Chief Justice of the United Kingdom, and Sir John Simon became the new Attorney General.
- The Roman Catholic dioceses of Barra, Caetité, and Ilhéus were established in Brazil.
- Born: Grandpa Jones, American country music musician, Country Music Hall of Fame and Museum inductee; as Louis Marshall Jones, in Niagara, Kentucky, United States (d. 1998)
- Died:
  - Daniel David Palmer, 68, American chiropractor, founder of chiropractic medicine, founder of the Palmer College of Chiropractic (b. 1845)
  - Polk Miller, 69, American musician, early performer of folk banjo music (b. 1844)

== October 21, 1913 (Tuesday) ==
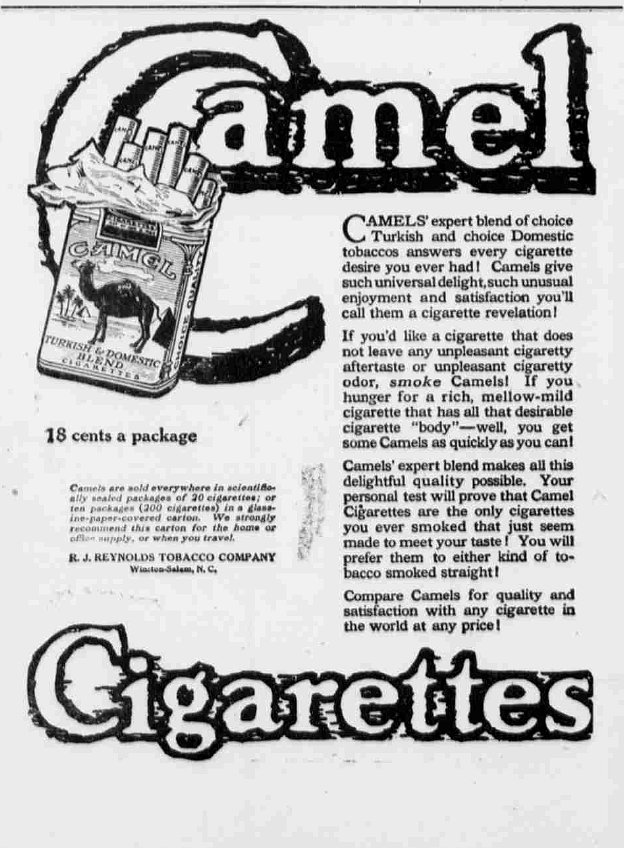
R.J. Reynolds' new "Turkish blend" cigarette

- A conspiracy, by monarchists within the Portuguese Army, to overthrow the republic and to restore King Manuel to the throne, was put down by loyal officers in the city of Viana do Castelo.
- Camel cigarettes were introduced by the R. J. Reynolds Tobacco Company. The brand name was a reference to the cigarette's blend of Turkish and Oriental tobacco, and the image of a dromedary camel, on the packet, was based on "Old Joe," an animal at the Barnum and Bailey Circus.
- Broadway's Shubert Theatre, most famous for its fifteen-year run of the musical A Chorus Line, opened at 225 West 44th Street in New York. The first presentation was the George Bernard Shaw play, Caesar and Cleopatra, with the British actor Johnston Forbes-Robertson starring as Julius Caesar.
- The village of Chipman, Alberta, was established.
- Born: Octav Botnar, Ukrainian-British business leader, founder of Nissan Motor Manufacturing UK, as importer of the Japanese Datsun automobile to the UK, later its manufacturing operations in the UK; as Oswald Bundorf, in Czernowitz, Austria-Hungary (present-day Chernivtsi, Ukraine) (d. 1998)

== October 22, 1913 (Wednesday) ==
- An explosion killed 263 coal miners at the Stag Canyon Fuel Company's Mine Number 2, near Dawson, New Mexico. Thirty-seven years later, when the Phelps-Dodge Coal Company shut down its operations at the end of April, 1950, Dawson would become a ghost town.
- Princeton University inaugurated its first graduate school program.
- The Sydenham College of Commerce and Economics, named after Lord Sydenham who had been the Governor of Bombay until April, was established in Bombay as "the first college of commerce in Asia."
- W. E. B. Du Bois debuted his historical pageant The Star of Ethiopia in New York City to a largely positive reception from the public, praised for its focus on contributions by Africans and their descendants on human history.
- Born:
  - Bảo Đại, the last Emperor of Vietnam and first head of state of South Vietnam; as Prince Nguyen Vinh Khai of the Nguyễn dynasty, in Huế, French Indochina (present-day Vietnam) (d. 1997)
  - Robert Capa, Hungarian-born American photographer, recipient of the Medal of Freedom; as Endre Ernő Friedmann, in Budapest, Austria-Hungary (present-day Hungary) (killed by landmine, 1954)
  - Tamara Desni, German-British film actress, known for film roles such as Falling for You and Fire Over England; as Tamara Brodsky, in Berlin, German Empire (present-day Germany) (d. 2008)
- Died: Reuben Gold Thwaites, 60, American historian best known for his research into the Lewis and Clark Expedition, died of heart failure (b. 1853)

== October 23, 1913 (Thursday) ==
- The first worldwide convention of the Woman's Christian Temperance Union (WCTU) was held, with representatives of 50 nations assembling in Brooklyn.
- The United States Senate passed the "La Follette Seaman's Bill", which "ended the virtual enslavement of sailors" by outlawing one-year service contracts and allowing workers on private American ships to quit upon reaching port. The bill, sponsored by Robert M. La Follette, also required that before a ship could sail from an American port, it had to have sufficient lifeboats and rafts for all aboard, and training for the crew to permit two seamen for each boat.
- The Giacobini–Zinner comet, initially discovered by Michel Giacobini on December 20, 1900, was recovered by German astronomer Ernst Zinner, who confirmed that it had an orbital period of slightly more than 6.5 years. The comet would return to Earth's solar system in 1985 and would be explored by the International Cometary Explorer space probe.
- The Hundreds of Condada and Karcultaby were established as part of the 24 land divisions administrated within the County of Robinson, South Australia, Australia.
- The Węgliniec–Czerwona Woda railway is opened in the German Empire.
- Died: Edwin Klebs, 79. Prussian-Swiss medical researcher who identified the bacteria that causes diphtheria (b. 1834)

== October 24, 1913 (Friday) ==
- Winston Churchill, at the time the British First Lord of the Admiralty, made a final attempt to halt to the ongoing arms race between the United Kingdom and Germany, suggesting a joint moratorium on the building of more warships. A previous suggestion had been rejected by Kaiser Wilhelm; "This time", a historian would write later, "his proposal wasn't even acknowledged."
- An alternative to the Ulster Covenant of 1912 was created at a public meeting in Dublin to dispute assertions made by the original covenant against the Home Rule Bill set forth by the British government.
- Born: Tito Gobbi, Italian opera singer, best known for his collaborations with the Lyric Opera of Chicago; in Bassano del Grappa, Kingdom of Italy (present-day Italy) (d. 1984)
- Died:
  - Isabel Barrows, 68, U.S. public servant, first woman employed by the United States Department of State (b. 1845)
  - Cornelia Cole Fairbanks, 61, American suffragist, early advocate for women's right and women's suffrage, wife of former U.S. Vice President Charles W. Fairbanks, died of pneumonia (b. 1852)

== October 25, 1913 (Saturday) ==
- One day before the expiration of the eight-day ultimatum given by Austria-Hungary on October 18, Serbian troops withdrew from Albania.
- The Count of Romanones resigned as Prime Minister of Spain, along with his cabinet, after failing a vote of confidence by only three votes. On the motion in the Spanish Senate of whether to support the Romanones administration, the result was 103 in favor, 106 against. Former Prime Minister Eduardo Dato would become the new premier on October 29.
- The provisional government for Western Thrace between Turkey and Greece was dissolved and taken over by Bulgaria, who had laid claim to it following the First Balkan War.
- The restoration of Congress Hall in Philadelphia, where the United States Congress met from 1790 to 1800 before Washington, D.C., became the American capital, was completed, and the building returned to its 1776 appearance. At the dedication, U.S. President Woodrow Wilson commented that "it has seemed to me that I saw ghosts crowding in, a great assemblage of spirits, no longer visible to us, but whose influence we still feel as we feel the molding power of history itself."
- The Iwate Light Railway was extended in the Iwate Prefecture, Japan, with stations Nitanai, Oyamada, and Tsuchizawa serving the line.
- The Toronto Public Library opened the new Gladstone library on Bloor Street West in Toronto.
- The Butt–Millet Memorial Fountain was dedicated without ceremony in President's Park, Washington D.C. to commemorate army officer Archibald Butt (aide to U.S. President William Howard Taft) and journalist Francis Davis Millet (a close friend to Butt). Both men perished during the sinking of the RMS Titanic the year before.
- The comedic opera Arshin Mal Alan by composer Uzeyir Hajibeyov premiered in Saint Petersburg.
- The village of Wabamun Beach, Alberta, was established. It would be later renamed Kapasiwin in 1918.
- Born:
  - Klaus Barbie, German paramilitary officer, member of SS and Gestapo, nicknamed "The Butcher of Lyon" for his war crimes in France during World War II; as Nikolaus Barbie, in Bad Godesberg, German Empire (present-day Germany) (d. 1991)
  - Larry Itliong, Philippine-American labor leader, key figure in the Delano grape strike in the 1960s; as Modesto Dulay Itliong, in San Nicolas, Pangasinan, Philippine Islands (present-day Philippines) (d. 1977)
- Died: Frederick Rolfe, 53, British novelist who wrote Hadrian the Seventh under the pen name "Baron Corvo," died of a stroke (b. 1860)

== October 26, 1913 (Sunday) ==
- Presidential and legislative elections were held as scheduled in Mexico, but the results were not announced. The Mexican Constitution required that at least one-third of the registered voters had to participate in order for an election to be valid, and it was estimated than less than one-eighth of the electorate turned out.
- Parliamentary elections were held in Italy, with the Liberal Party of Prime Minister Giovanni Giolitti retaining its majority. For the first time, there was no literacy requirement for all voters (those over 30 were exempt) and the secret ballot was used throughout the nation.
- Born: Charlie Barnet, American jazz musician, known for his saxophone collaborations with other artists including Billy May; as Charles Daly Barnet, in New York City, United States (d. 1991)

== October 27, 1913 (Monday) ==
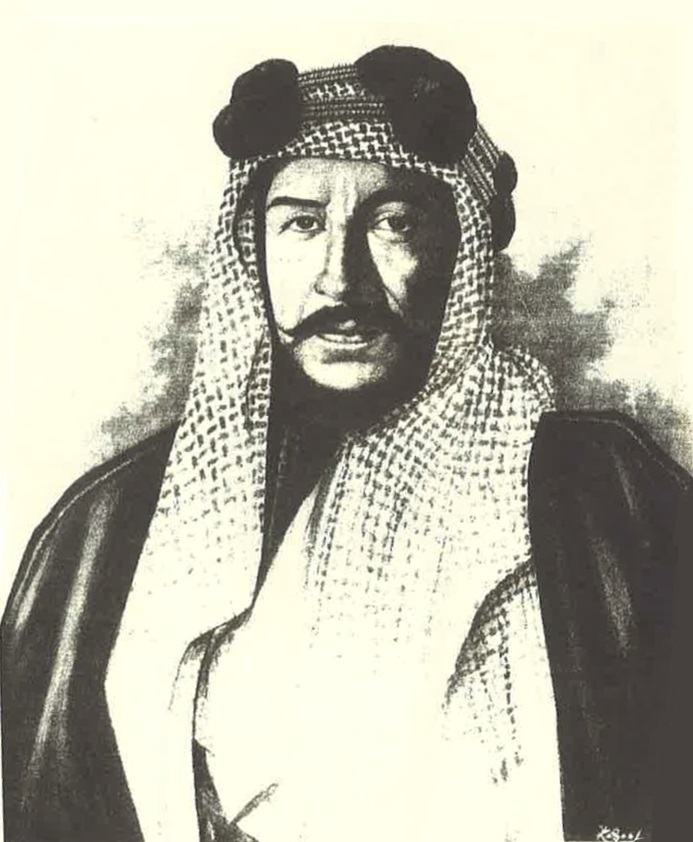
The Emir Mubarak

- The Emir of Kuwait, Mubarak Al-Sabah, signed a treaty with the United Kingdom, pledging that if oil were discovered in Kuwait, the British government would have to approve the granting of a concession to any company seeking drilling rights.
- In a foreign policy address made in Mobile, Alabama, at the Southern Commercial Congress, U.S. President Woodrow Wilson announced a new direction, saying that the United States "will devote herself to showing that she knows how to make an honorable and fruitful use of the territory she has." Wilson's statement is sometimes misquoted, usually in stories about Mobile, as "the United States would never again wage a war of aggression."
- Two people were killed by a tornado in Wales. As of 2007, this was the last instance of a fatality from a tornado in the United Kingdom.
- Eduardo Dato became the new Prime Minister of Spain.
- General Félix Díaz, who had been a candidate for President of Mexico in the elections the day before, was granted refuge at the American consulate in Veracruz, and transferred to the safety of the American battleship USS Louisiana.
- Russian surgeon Yustin Djanelidze became the first person to successfully fix a wound on the ascending aorta of the heart.
- Lon Chaney appeared in his last unbilled screen role in the silent film drama The Restless Spirit, directed by Allan Dwan and starring J. Warren Kerrigan. Released by the Universal Film Manufacturing Company, the film is now considered lost.
- Born:
  - Otto Wichterle, Czech optometrist, inventor of the soft contact lens; in Prostějov, Austria-Hungary (present-day Czech Republic) (d. 1998)
  - Joe Medicine Crow, Native American Indian historian, chronicler of the history of the Crow people; as Joseph Medicine Crow, in Lodge Grass, Montana, United States (d. 2016)

== October 28, 1913 (Tuesday) ==
- Menahem Mendel Beilis, a Jewish factory superintendent who had been falsely accused of the ritualistic murder of a child, was acquitted by a jury in Kiev.
- The first trams began operating in Vinnytsia, Ukraine.
- Ten minutes before baseball's New York Giants and Chicago White Sox were preparing to start an exhibition game in Tulsa, Oklahoma, the bleachers over the right field collapsed, injuring more than 100 people. Seven hundred fans had crowded onto benches that were meant to hold 400. One spectator, U.S. Army Private Chester Taylor, was killed.
- The classic American newspaper comic strip Krazy Kat, by George Herriman, made its debut, first appearing in the New York Evening Journal. The last strip would be published on June 25, 1944, two months after Herriman's death.

== October 29, 1913 (Wednesday) ==
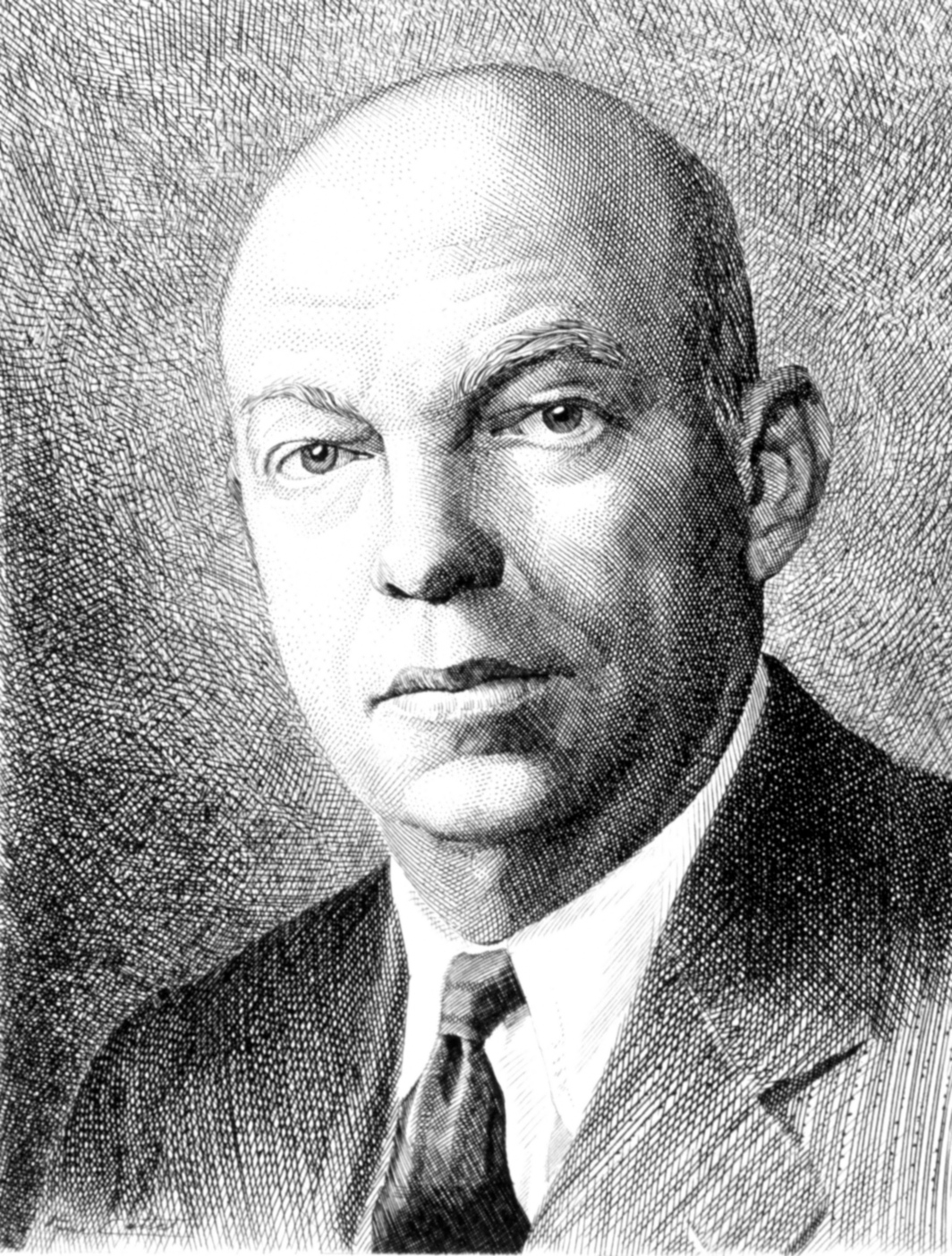
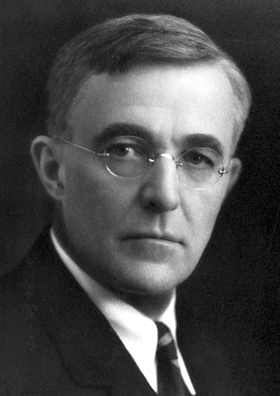
Competing inventors Edwin Howard Armstrong and Irving Langmuir
- After months of delay, Edwin Howard Armstrong filed a patent application on his invention of the regenerative circuit. On the same day, Irving Langmuir applied for a patent on his own regenerative circuit. In the lawsuits that followed over nearly 20 years, Armstrong would be given priority on the strength of a diagram of the circuit, which he had had notarized on January 13, 1913 and would be granted U.S. Patent #1,113,149 on October 6, 1914.

== October 30, 1913 (Thursday) ==
- Serbia and Montenegro signed a treaty defining the border between the two Balkan kingdoms. Serbian Minister of War Miloš Božanović (on behalf King Peter) and Montenegrin Education Minister Mirko Mijuskovic (for King Nicholas) executed the agreement.
- Edward Morris and the Newfoundland People's Party returned to power following the general election in the Dominion of Newfoundland.
- The Peace Monument cenotaph was officially unveiled by Governor Samuel M. Ralston in front of the Adams County Courthouse in Decatur, Indiana.
- The sports club Barracas was established in Buenos Aires as a rowing club but switched to association football.

== Friday, October 31, 1913 (Friday) ==
- 15-year-old Ida Kaufman, a student at the Ferrer Modern School in New York, married her former history teacher, 28-year-old Will Durant. Ida would take on the name Ariel Durant, and the Durants would go on to write the eleven-volume study of Western history, The Story of Civilization. According to some accounts, Ariel roller-skated to the New York City Hall to attend the civil ceremony.
- The Public Service Association was established to represent government employees and public servants in New Zealand. The organizations currently represents some 70,000 members.
- The Lincoln Highway, built specifically for automobiles and running from New York, New York to San Francisco, California, was formally dedicated.
