= November 1913 =

Month of 1913

<<	November 1913					>>
Su	Mo	Tu	We	Th	Fr	Sa
						1
2	3	4	5	6	7	8
9	10	11	12	13	14	15
16	17	18	19	20	21	22
23	24	25	26	27	28	29
30

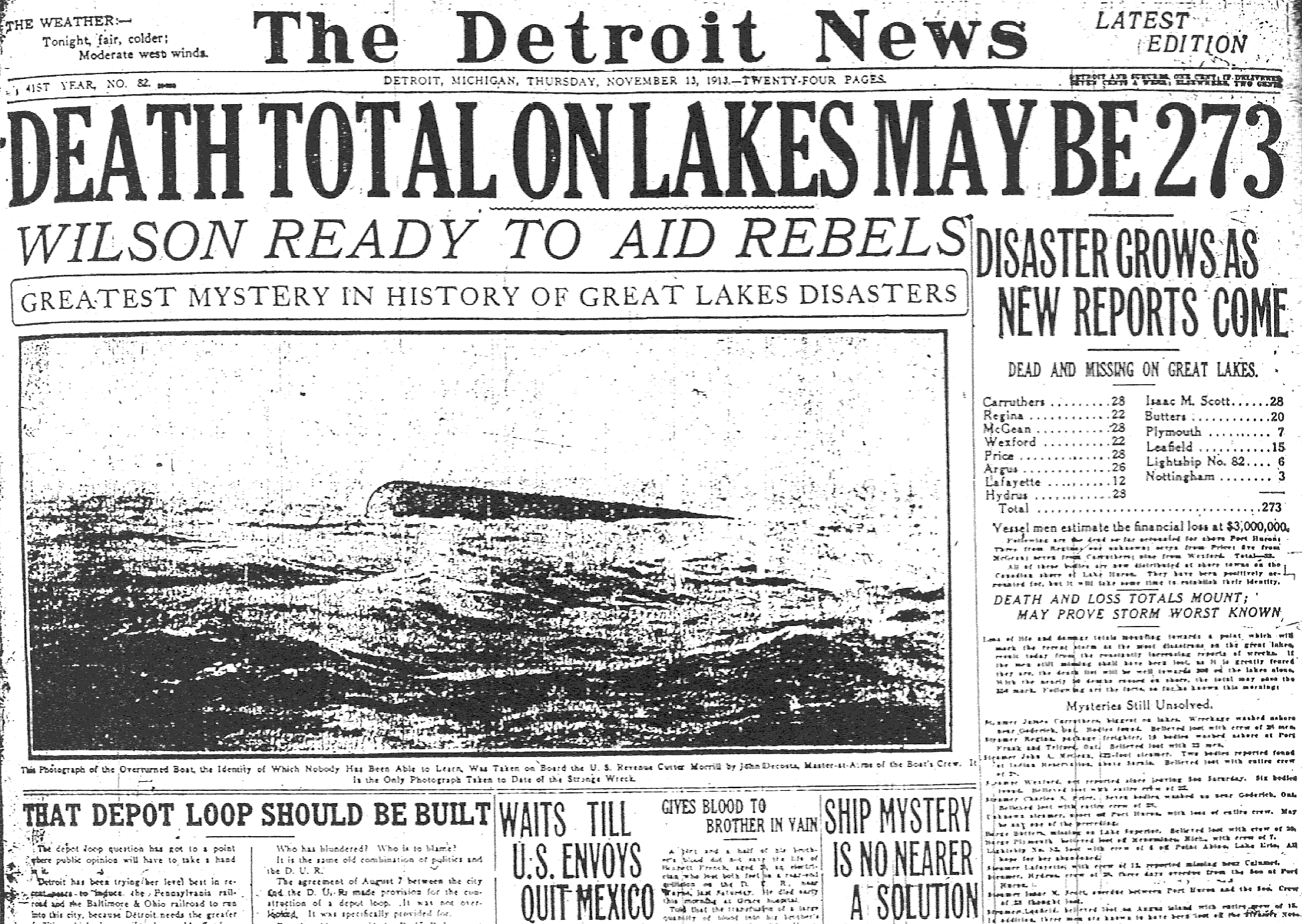
November 9, 1913: The "White Hurricane" gale sinks 19 ships on Michigan's Great Lakes, drowns hundreds

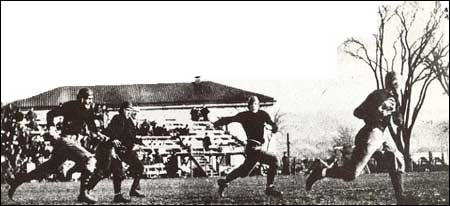
Notre Dame's Knute Rockne demonstrates the superiority of the forward pass in football, Irish upset Army Cadets 35-13

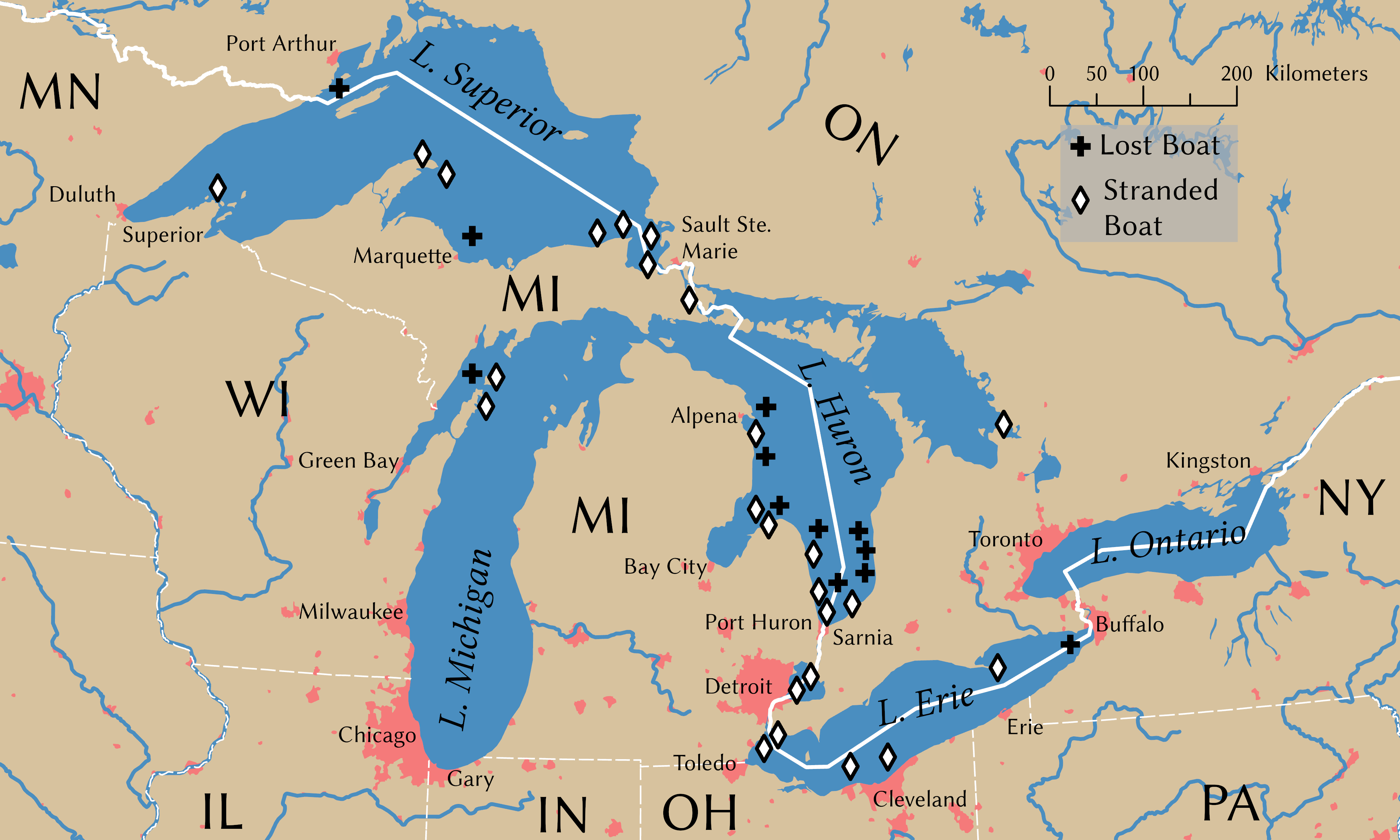
Map of casualties of the storm

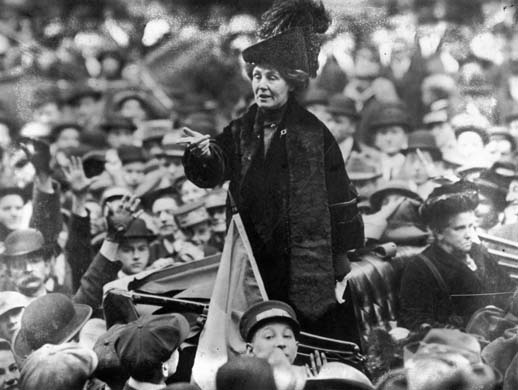
British suffragette Pankhurst delivers "Freedom or Death" speech to American women in Hartford

The following events occurred in November 1913:

== November 1, 1913 (Saturday) ==
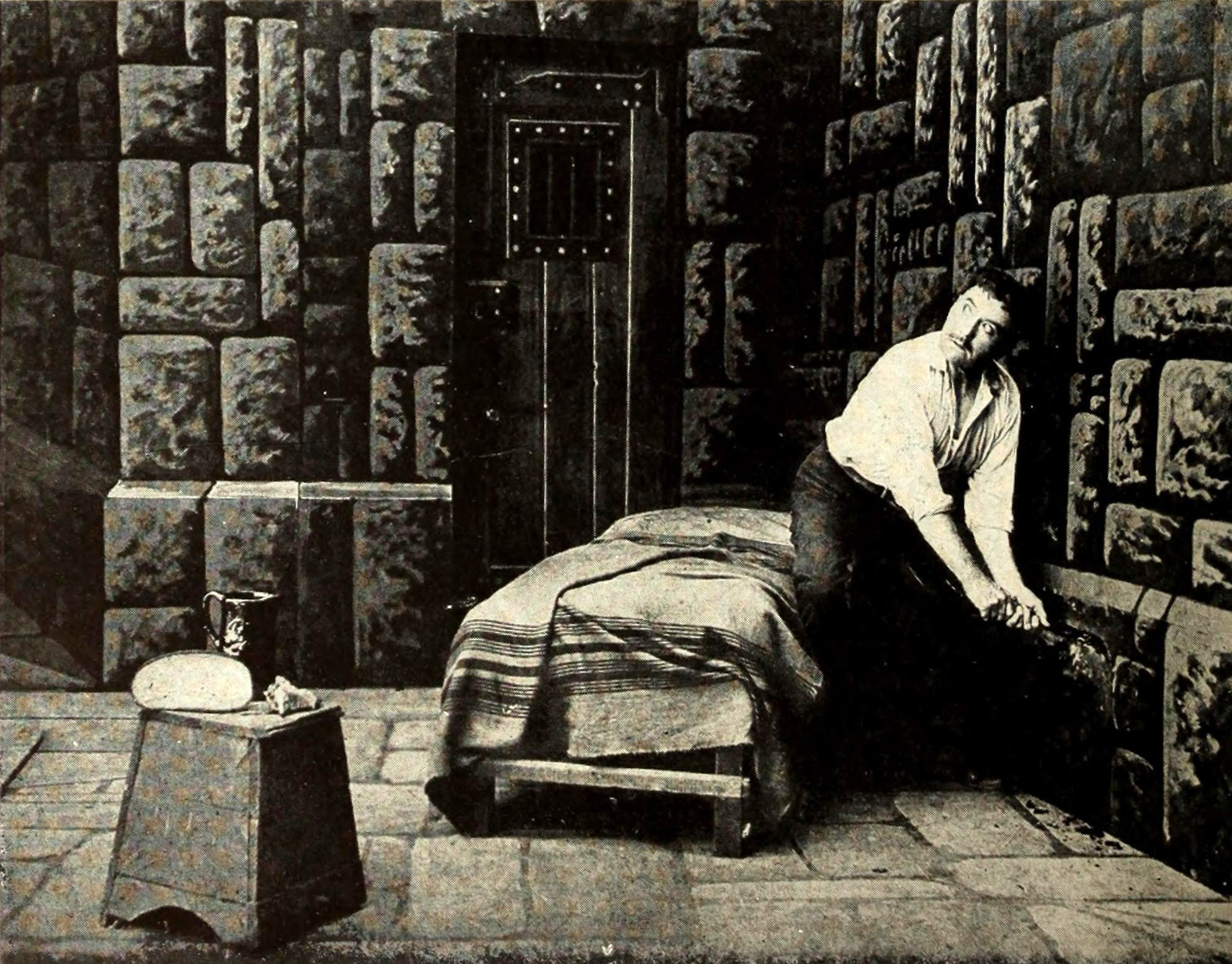
Film still of James O'Neill as the Count of Monte Cristo

- The Count of Monte Cristo, at one hour and nine minutes long the first feature film in the United States (at a time when most films ran for one or two reels for a few minutes) premiered.
- The National Conservation Exposition officially closed in Knoxville, Tennessee. Over a million visitors attended the exposition which explored conservation activities throughout the Southern United States.
- Municipal elections were held for the Liverpool City Council, with the Conservative Party retaining the most seats. It was the last local election held before the outbreak of World War I the following year.
- The American steamship SS Manoa was launched by Newport News Shipbuilding in Newport News, Virginia to serve the Matson Line between San Francisco and Hawaii.
- The Notre Dame Fighting Irish football team upset the Army Cadets, 35–13, by using the forward pass. Although the pass had been legal since 1906, it had seldom been used in a major college football game. Gus Dorais completed 12 of 14 attempts, most of them to future Notre Dame coach Knute Rockne for long gains (one of which went for a touchdown). The game demonstrated the forward pass's strategic advantage for smaller teams against larger ones.
- The Honam rail line was extended to Gwangju, Korea with stations Gwangju Songjeong and Naju service the line.
- The musical comedy Are You There? by composer Ruggero Leoncavallo premiered at the Prince of Wales Theatre in London, but the audience response was so hostile it nearly resulted in a riot. The show closed in 23 days due to poor reviews and ticket sales.
- The association football club União was established in Funchal, Portugal, and remains one of the oldest running clubs in the country.
- Born: Andrzej Mostowski, Polish mathematician, developed the set theory Mostowski collapse lemma; in Lemberg, Austria-Hungary (present-day Lviv, Ukraine) (d. 1975)

== November 2, 1913 (Sunday) ==
- Prince Ernest Augustus married Princess Victoria Louise, allowing them to become the Duke and Duchess of Brunswick as well as healing a rift between the royal houses of Hohenzollern and Hanover. The wedding was also the last gathering of European monarchs before the outbreak of World War I.
- King Rama decreed the establishment of a flying corps for Siam.
- St. Louis Browns manager George Stovall signed on with the Kansas City Packers as first baseman and manager, the first Major League Baseball player to jump to the Federal League.
- The daily Morning Paper began publication in Reykjavík.
- Born:
  - Burt Lancaster, American actor, known for roles in From Here to Eternity, Sweet Smell of Success, and Birdman of Alcatraz, recipient of the Academy Award for Best Actor for Elmer Gantry; as Burton Lancaster, in New York City (d. 1994)
  - Carmen Amaya, Spanish Romani dancer, promoter of the flamenco dance; in Barcelona(d. 1963)
  - Ivor Roberts-Jones, British sculptor known for works including "The Two Kings" at Harlech Castle, Wales and the commissioned statue of Winston Churchill in Parliament Square; in Oswestry, Shropshire, England (d. 1996)
  - Harry Babbitt, American singer, lead vocalist for the Kay Kyser band during the Big Band era; in St. Louis (d. 2004)

== November 3, 1913 (Monday) ==
- The United States Department of Justice filed an antitrust suit seeking to break up International Harvester.
- The U.S. Supreme Court upheld the constitutionality of a Massachusetts law, providing for a tax on foreign corporations.
- The Kiev Conservatory was established by the Russian Musical Society.
- The opera Ulenspiegel by composer Walter Braunfels premiered at the Hoftheater in Stuttgart, Germany.
- The symphonic composition Falstaff, composed by Edward Elgar and based on the Shakespearean character, had its London premiere at Queen's Hall where it was well received by the public.
- Born:
  - Marika Rökk, Austrian-German singer and actress, leading actress for German Nazi films; as Marie Karoline Rökk, in Cairo, Khedivate of Egypt (d. 2004)
  - Albert Cossery, Egyptian-born French writer, author of Men God Forgot; in Cairo, Khedivate of Egypt (d. 2008)
- Died:
  - Sava Grujić, 72, Prime Minister of Serbia on four occasions between 1888 and 1906 (b. 1840)
  - Hans Bronsart von Schellendorff, 83, German composer, known for his collaborations with Franz Liszt (b. 1830)

== November 4, 1913 (Tuesday) ==
- The first popular elections for the United States Senate were held. Previously, state legislatures elected their states' two members of the United States Senate. Some of the election results were as follows:
  - Democrat David I. Walsh was elected Governor of Massachusetts in a three-way race against Republican challenge Augustus Peabody Gardner and Charles S. Bird of the Progressive Party.
  - Democrat James Fairman Fielder was elected Governor of New Jersey in a three-way race against Republican challenger Edward C. Stokes and Everett Colby of the Progressive Party.
  - Democrat Henry Carter Stuart was elected Governor of Virginia by a landslide when the Republican Party failed to produce a candidate.
  - Senate elections were also held, most notably for Blair Lee who defeated Thomas Parran 112,000 to 71,000, or 56% of the vote, for Maryland's vacant senatorial seat (most direct senatorial elections would be held in 1914, 1916 and 1918).
  - Willard Bartlett was elected Chief Judge of the New York Court of Appeals.
- An earthquake with a magnitude of 6.3 killed 150 people in the Apurimac Region, Chile.
- At least 39 people were killed near Melun when the Marseille-Lyon-Paris express train collided with a local train.
- Born:
  - Gig Young (stage name for Byron Barr), American film actor, recipient for the Academy Award for Best Supporting Actor for They Shoot Horses, Don't They?; in St. Cloud, Minnesota (d. 1978)
  - Paul Irniger, Swiss serial killer; in Izerbash, Canton of Schwyz (executed by guillotine, 1939)

== November 5, 1913 (Wednesday) ==
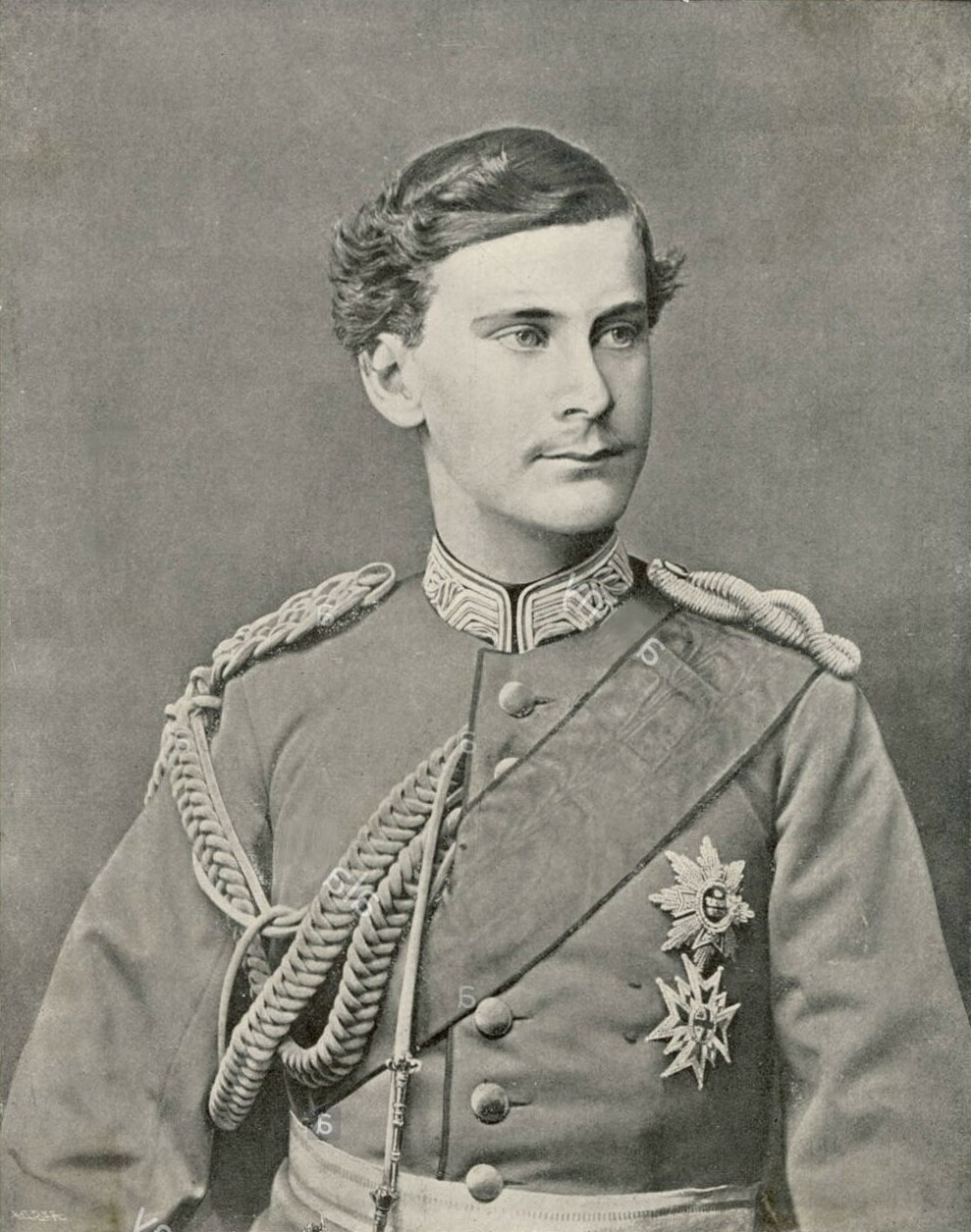
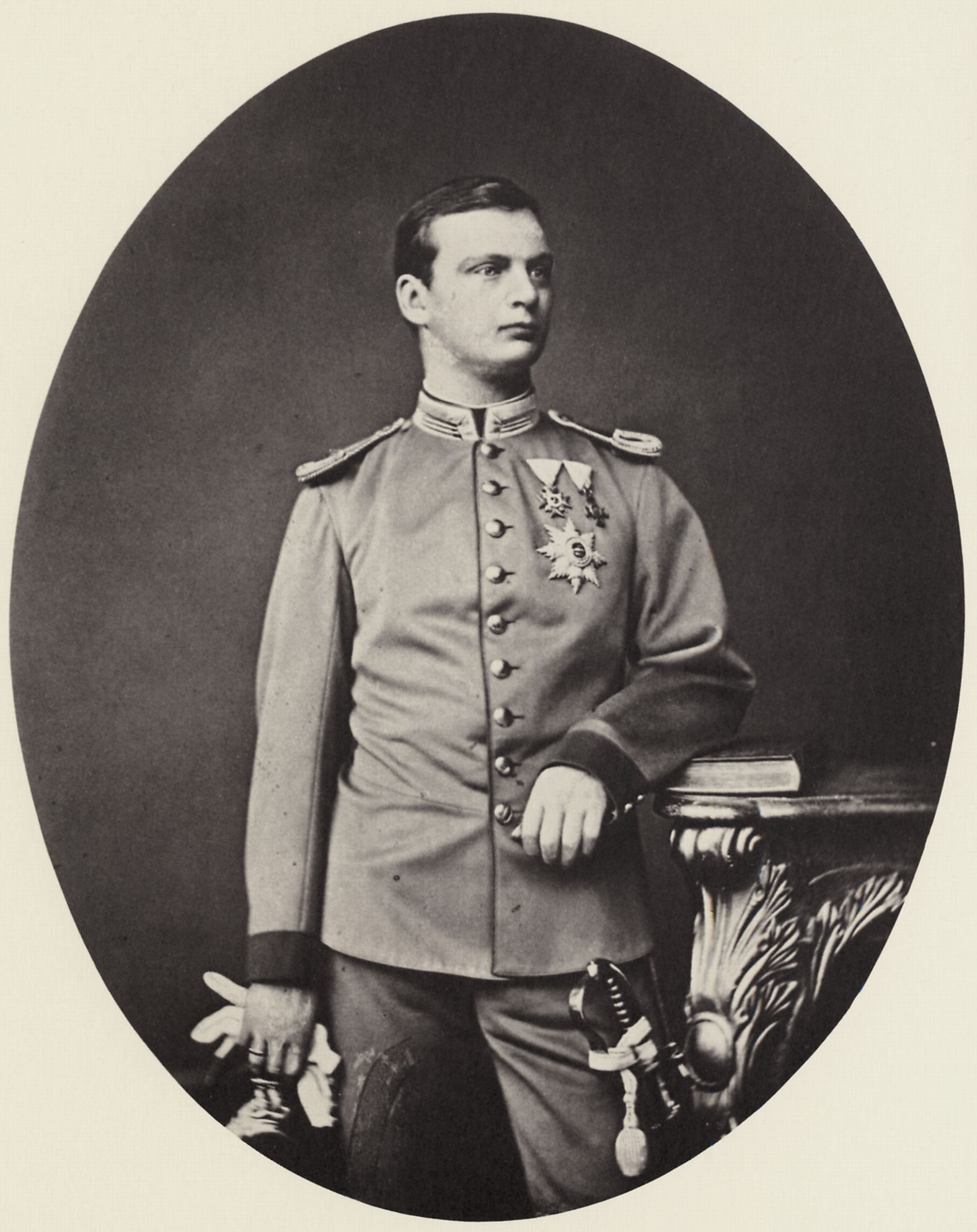
Otto of Bavaria (left) and new King Ludwig III (right)
- Otto of Bavaria, known popularly as "Mad King Otto," was deposed by his cousin, Prince Regent Ludwig, who assumed the title Ludwig III, the last reigning King of Bavaria.
- The Los Angeles Aqueduct was dedicated near what is now Sylmar, California, before over 43,000 spectators, 25,000 of whom traveled by automobile to the site where waters of the Owens River flowed downhill from the Owens Valley. Chief engineer William Mulholland shouted, "There it is. Take it!" With an available source of water for its growing population, Los Angeles (and its suburbs) would become a major American metropolis, while the rural population in the Owens Valley would suffer from water shortages.
- A declaration between the Russian Empire and China recognized Mongolia as part of China but with internal autonomy. However, the declaration was not considered legitimate by Mongolia, since its government had not participated in the decision.
- China's President Yuan Shikai dissolved the Kuomintang, the largest political party in the National Assembly, with nearly 300 deputies having to resign.
- Federal troops repelled Pancho Villa and his forces from taking Chihuahua City, Mexico.
- Born:
  - Vivien Leigh, British stage and film actress, winner of the Academy Award for Best Actress for Gone With The Wind and for A Streetcar Named Desire, recipient of the Tony Award for Best Actress in a Musical for Tovarich; as Vivian Mary Hartley, in Darjeeling, Bengal Province British India (d. 1967)
  - Guy Green, British cinematographer, known for his work with David Lean including Oliver Twist, recipient of the Academy Award for Best Cinematography for Great Expectations; in Frome, Somerset, England (d. 2005)
  - John McGiver, American film actor, known for film roles in Breakfast at Tiffany's and The Manchurian Candidate; in New York City (d. 1975)

== November 6, 1913 (Thursday) ==
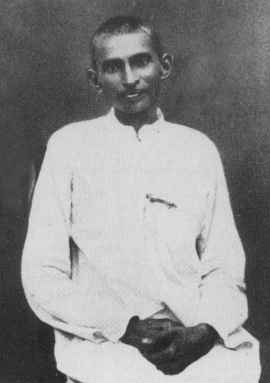
Attorney Mohandas K. Gandhi

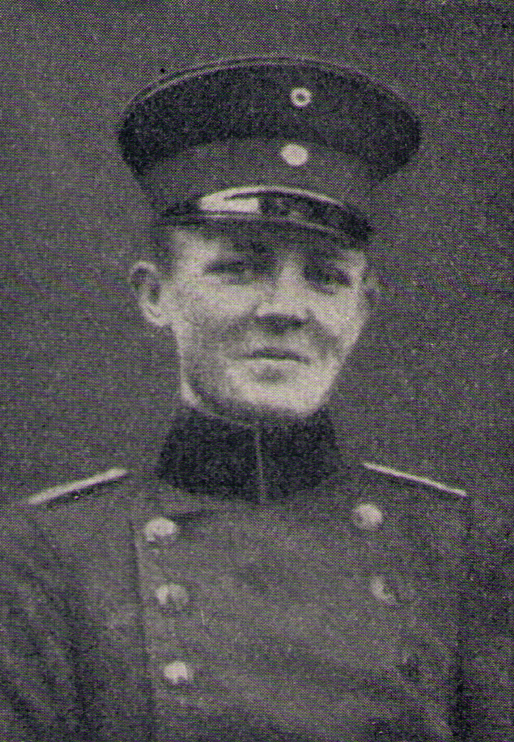
2nd Lieutenant von Forstner

- Mohandas Gandhi was arrested while leading a march of Indian miners in South Africa.
- The "Zabern Affair" was started in Saverne, Alsace (now France but part of Germany in 1913), when two local newspapers, Elsässer Anzeiger and Zaberner Anzeiger, ran articles concerning reports of disparaging remarks about Alsace residents, that had been made by 19-year-old Second Lieutenant Günter Freiherr von Forstner of the 2nd Upper Rhine Infantry Regiment No. 99 during a troop induction ceremony on October 28. Forstner reportedly told his soldiers, "If you are attacked, then make use of your weapon; if you stab such a Wackes (slur for a person who lived in the Alsace region) in the process, then you'll get ten marks from me."
- All 3,000 members of the Indiana National Guard were activated by order of Governor Samuel M. Ralston and called to Indianapolis to preserve order during the streetcar strike. The walkout was settled the next day.
- Two major storm fronts converged on the western side of Lake Superior and grew into an extra-tropical cyclone. The storm - known as the 'White Hurricane' and eventually the Great Lakes Storm - created hurricane-force winds, massive waves and whiteout conditions.
- Born: Cho Ki-chon, North Korean poet, promoter of Korean literary nationalism through works including Mt. Paeketu; in Ael'tugeu, Vladivostok District, Russian Empire (killed in bombing raid, 1951)
- Died: William Henry Preece, 79, British engineer who developed wireless communication for the United Kingdom (b. 1834)

== November 7, 1913 (Friday) ==
- More than 200 people were killed in an earthquake in Peru near Abancay.
- Warnings for the massive Great Lakes storm were first posted, as the U.S. Coast Guard stations and the United States Department of Agriculture's Weather Bureau offices at Lake Superior ports raised a vertical sequence of red, white, and red lanterns, indicating that a hurricane was coming.
- English theater producer Kenelm Foss premiered the play Magic by G. K. Chesterton at The Little Theatre in London.
- Born:
  - Albert Camus, French writer, recipient of the Nobel Prize in Literature for works including The Rebel and The Plague; in Mondovi, French Algeria (present-day Dréan, Algeria) (killed in motor accident, 1960)
  - Elizabeth Bradford Holbrook, Canadian sculptor, co-founder of the Canadian Portrait Academy; as Elizabeth Mary Bradford, in Hamilton, Ontario (d. 2009)
  - Alekos Sakellarios, Greek film actor known for over 140 features including Woe to the Young; in Athens (d. 1991)
- Died: Alfred Russel Wallace, 90, Welsh biologist, conceived the theory of evolution through natural selection independently of Charles Darwin (b. 1823)

== November 8, 1913 (Saturday) ==
- The status of the Great Lakes storm was upgraded to "severe", and centered over eastern Lake Superior, covering the entire lake basin. Some vessels caught out in the storm included:
  - The U.S. steamboat Louisiana, which ran aground and caught fire near Washington Island in Lake Michigan. The crew were able to evacuate and safely reach shore. A century later, the wreck remains a popular area for divers and archaeologists.
  - The U.S. steamer Waldo, which was driven onto Gull Rock in Lake Superior. The vessel broke in two and the 24-person crew took shelter in the still-intact cabin for 90 hours until rescue from the Portage Life-Saving Station on November 11.
- U.S. Navy destroyer Downes was launched by New York Shipbuilding in Camden, New Jersey as third in a class to serve in World War I.
- The ninth Salon d'Automne exhibit opened in Paris and ran until early January, with works by Roger de La Fresnaye (The Conquest of the Air), Albert Gleizes (Portrait de l'éditeur Eugène Figuière), Jean Metzinger (En Canot, L'Oiseau bleu), and Francis Picabia on display.
- The monument to U.S. Army officer John Breckinridge Castleman, designed by Roland Hinton Perry, was unveiled in Louisville, Kentucky.
- The German play Woyzeck by Georg Büchner, left unfinished at the writer's death in 1837, received its first performance at the Residenztheater in Munich.
- Born: Robert Strauss, American actor, known for film roles in The Seven Year Itch and The Man with the Golden Arm; in New York City (d. 1975)
- Died: John Belcher, 72, British architect, designer of Neo-Baroque buildings such as the Ashton Memorial in London (b. 1841)

== November 9, 1913 (Sunday) ==
- The Great Lakes Storm ravaged four of the five Great Lakes around Michigan, sinking 19 ships (six of which have never been located) and killing 250 people. Most of the damage occurred in Lake Huron where huge waves battered ships, scrambling to seek shelter along the lake's southern end. Most of the ships would remain missing more than a century after the storm, including:
  - The Canadian freighter SS Regina, which sank with 32 men on board after sending of a distress signal. After sending word that it had hit a shoal while trying to reach Port Huron, Michigan, SS Regina capsized and sank. The Regina would be located in 80-feet deep waters some 65 years later.
  - The U.S. freighter Hydrus, which sank in 35 feet (11 m) high waves on Lake Huron with 25 crew on board. It would be located more than a century later in 2015.
  - The U.S. freighter SS Argus, sister ship to the Hydrus, which was also lost on Lake Huron with 25 men. Parts of the wreckage were found days later on the shore of Bayfield, Ontario but the entire ship was never located.
  - The U.S. freighter SS John A. McGean, which went down with all 23 crew.
  - The Canadian freighter SS James Carruthers, which went down in Lake Huron with all 22 crew lost. The wreckage was never found.
  - The British bulk freighter SS Wexford, which sank in Lake Huron with a loss of all 17 hands. The wreck would eventually be found on the lake bottom, 87 years after the disaster, on August 25, 2000.
  - The American ore transporter SS Henry B. Smith, which sank in Lake Superior with all 25 crew killed after leaving Marquette, Michigan to cross the lake in the belief that the storm had abated. Shortly after the storm returned, on-shore witnesses reported seeing the Henry B. Smith struggling through high waves to reach shelter at Keweenaw Point north of the harbor. It is believed the ship sank either the evening of the 9th or early morning of the 10th; only two bodies were recovered. The Henry B Smith wreck would not be found until May 2013 by shipwreck hunters, 535 feet (163 m) off Marquette.
- The Canadian freighter SS Leafield and her crew of 18 which sank in Lake Superior in the Great Lakes storm. More than 110 years later, the wreckage has not been located.
- The United States and Honduras signed a peace treaty in Washington, D.C., with Honduras becoming the latest of the Central American nations to accept the proposals of United States Secretary of State William Jennings Bryan.
- Funakawa Light Railway extended the Oga Line in the Akita Prefecture, Japan, with station Futada serving the line.

== November 10, 1913 (Monday) ==
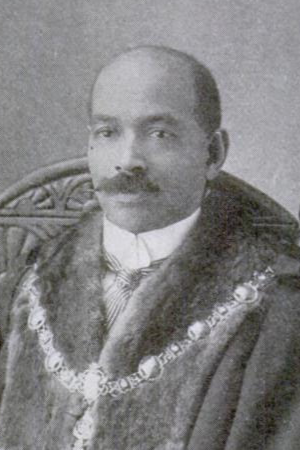
Mayor Archer

- Casualties of the Great Lakes Storm were located as the worst of the weather abated. A mystery ship, later identified as American freighter Charles S. Price, was spotted floating upside-down in Lake Huron. Meanwhile, bodies from Canadian freighter SS James Carruthers, including that of Captain William H. Wright, began washing up on shore at Point Clark and Kincardine, Ontario.
- British Prime Minister H. H. Asquith publicly declared that the United Kingdom had no intention in intervening in Mexico's affairs. "Mexico is still in the throes of civil war," said Asquith, "but there never was and never will be any question of political intervention by Great Britain in the domestic concerns of Mexico, or in the Central or South American States."
- John Archer became mayor of Battersea, England, the first black person to hold a mayoral seat in the United Kingdom. In his inaugural address to council, he said: "You have made history tonight ... Battersea has done many things in the past, but the greatest thing it has done is to show that it has no racial prejudice, and that it recognises a man for the work he has done."
- Born:
  - Álvaro Cunhal, Portuguese politician, secretary-general of the Portuguese Communist Party; in Coimbra (d. 2005)
  - Karl Shapiro, American poet, United States Poet Laureate 1946 to 1947; in Baltimore (d. 2000)
- Died: Richard Solomon, 63, South African lawyer, High Commissioner for the Union of South Africa from 1910 to 1913 (b. 1850)

== November 11, 1913 (Tuesday) ==
- The Chamber of Deputies of France defeated a proposal to grant women the right to vote. The measure attracted only 133 votes in favor, and 311 against.
- The U.S. freighter SS Isaac M. Scott sank in Lake Huron, taking with it all 28 crew aboard. The ship would be relocated by divers more than 60 years later, in 1976.
- The U.S. schooner Plymouth was being towed in Lake Michigan when it sank in the Great Lakes storm.
- The Nobel Prize in Physics was awarded to Heike Kamerlingh Onnes of the Netherlands, and the Nobel Prize in Chemistry was awarded to Alfred Werner of Zürich.
- Second Lieutenant Günter Freiherr von Forstner was ordered confined to six days house arrest, while official statements from military authorities in Strasbourg, Germany downplayed the incident of Forstner's use of a derogatory term ("Wackes") in referring to the Alsatian residents of Saverne, with the excuse that the offensive word was actually a general term for a contentious people. The Saverne public did not accept the excuse and continued to stage protests against the German regiment stationed in the town.
- The Broadway musical The Madcap Duchess by Victor Herbert and starring Ann Swinburne, Peggy Wood and Glenn Hall, opened at the Globe Theatre in New York City for a 71-performance run.
- Born:
  - Rosemary Inyama, Nigerian educator, politician, businesswoman and community developer; in Arochukwu, Igboland (date of death unknown)
  - Iain Macleod, British politician, Chancellor of the Exchequer 1970, cabinet minister for the Harold Macmillan and Edward Heath administrations; in Skipton, Yorkshire, England (d. 1970)

== November 12, 1913 (Wednesday) ==
- After several unsuccessful assaults on Ciudad Juárez, Mexico, Pancho Villa devised a Trojan Horse move by capturing a coal train and hiding 2,000 soldiers inside. The train successfully entered the city where Villa's forces fought 4,000 fortified federal troops.
- Bulgaria demanded that Greece release all prisoners of war taken captive during the Second Balkan War.
- Royal Navy battleship Benbow was launched by William Beardmore and Company in Glasgow as the first in a class for service in World War I including the Battle of Jutland.
- The Fairmount and Veblen Railway line opened between Richland County, North Dakota and Roberts and Marshall counties in South Dakota.
- Born: Teleco (Uriel Fernandes), Brazilian association football player, striker for the Corinthians; in Curitiba (d. 2000)

== November 13, 1913 (Thursday) ==
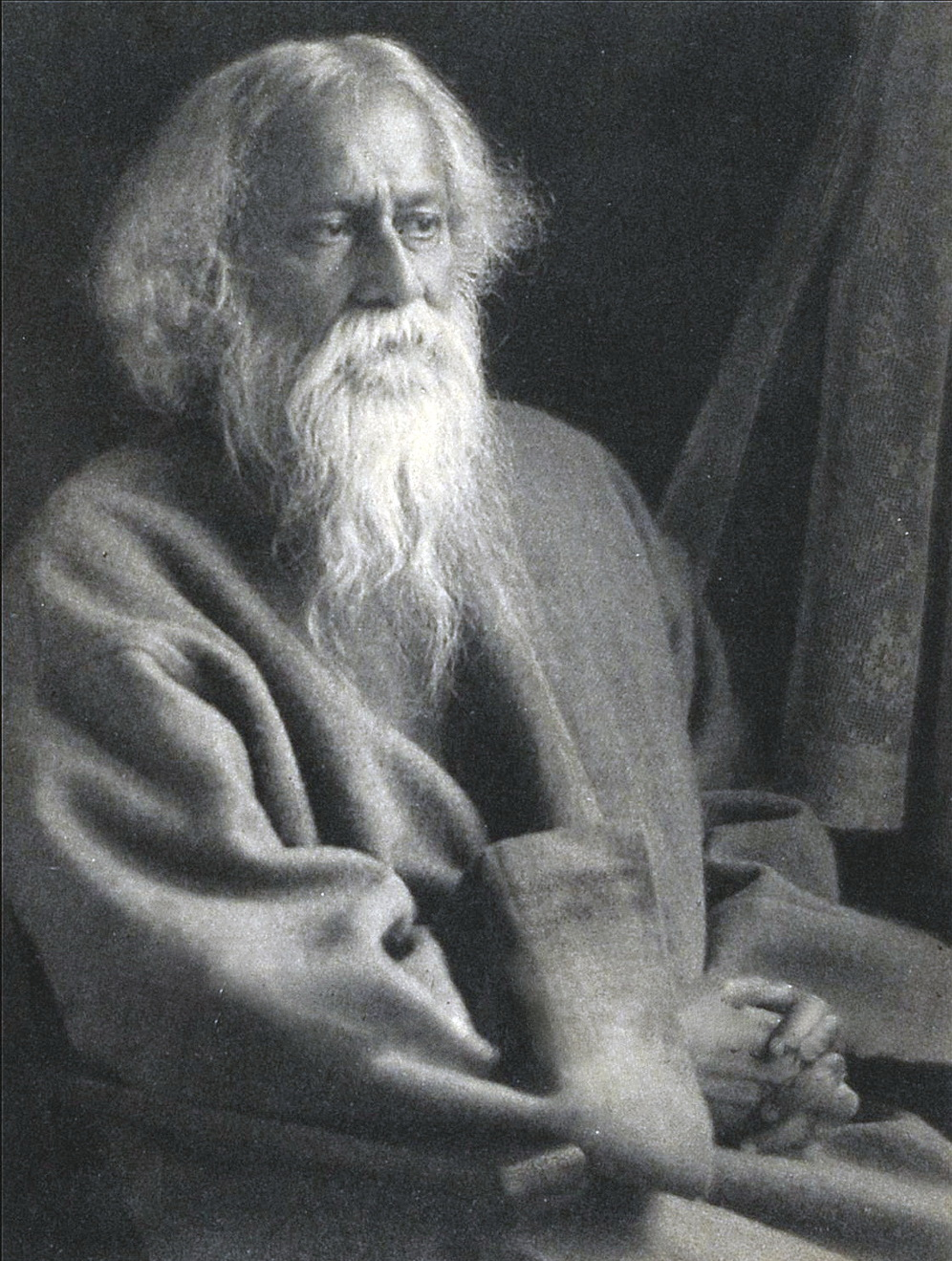
Nobel Laureate Rabindranath Tagore

- British suffragist Emmeline Pankhurst delivered her "Freedom or Death" speech in Hartford, Connecticut. An excerpt of her speech read: "Human life for us is sacred, but we say if any life is to be sacrificed it shall be ours; we won’t do it ourselves, but we will put the enemy in the position where they will have to choose between giving us freedom or giving us death."
- The Nobel Prize in Literature was awarded to Hindu poet Rabindranath Tagore, marking the first time the award was given to a non-European recipient.
- China's National Assembly, with 300 fewer deputies, suspended further operations because a quorum was no longer possible.
- Twelve people were killed, and more than 100 injured, in the wreck of an excursion train near Clayton, Alabama. The Central Georgia R.R. passenger train was carrying passengers from Ozark, Alabama to a country fair in Eufaula, Alabama, when it derailed and plunged down a steep embankment.
- The play General John Regan by Irish writer James Owen Hannay under the pen name George A. Birmingham made its American premiere at the Hudson Theatre in New York City.
- Association football club Rio Negro was established in Manaus, Brazil.
- Born:
  - Lon Nol, Prime Minister of Cambodia from 1969 to 1971, and president of the Khmer Republic from 1971 to 1975; in Prey Veng, French Protectorate of Cambodia, French Indochina (present-day Cambodia) (d. 1985)
  - Alexander Scourby, American actor, known for roles in film such as The Big Heat; in New York City (d. 1985)
  - Helen Mack (stage name for Helen McDougall), American actress, known for film roles such as His Girl Friday; in Rock Island, Illinois (d. 1986)

== November 14, 1913 (Friday) ==
- The Ottoman Empire and Greece signed a peace treaty to formally end the conflict brought on by the Second Balkan War and bring Macedonia and Epirus under Greek control.
- All 103 passengers and crew of the Spanish steamship Balmes, which had caught fire at sea, were rescued by the Cunard liner Pannonia.
- The first volume of the 3,200-page novel In Search of Lost Time by Marcel Proust was published as Swann's Way.
- The association football club Independiente Medellín was established in Medellín, Colombia.
- Born:
  - George Smathers, American politician, U.S. Senator from Florida from 1951 to 1969; in Atlantic City, New Jersey (d. 2007)
  - Wolfgang Heyda, German naval officer, U-boat commander during World War II; in Arys, East Prussia (present-day Orzysz, Poland) (d. 1947)
- Died: Kâmil Pasha, Turkish noble, Grand Vizier of the Ottoman Empire four times between 1885 and 1913 (b. 1833)

== November 15, 1913 (Saturday) ==
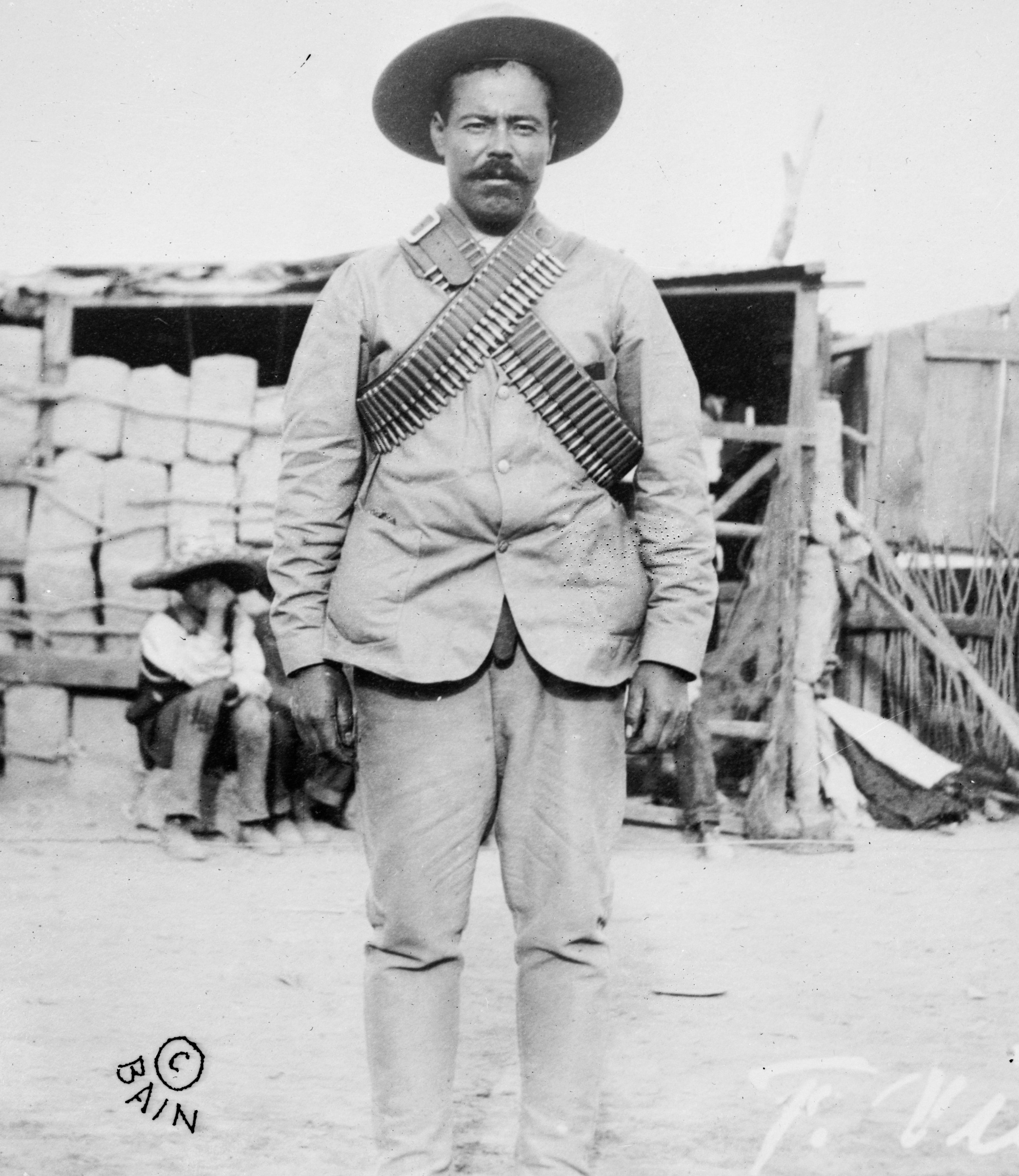
Pancho Villa

- The ship Charles S. Price was identified as the "mystery vessel" seen capsized five days earlier off the coast of Michigan. Milton Smith, an assistant engineer who decided at the last moment not to join his crew on premonition of disaster, aided in identifying any bodies that were found. Twenty-eight crew members lost their lives in the wreck.
- Pancho Villa was successful in capturing Ciudad Juárez, Mexico. Eleven trainloads of federal troops were sent up from Chihuahua City to engage Villa.
- The polar ship Karluk reached 73°N, the most northerly point of its drift in the Beaufort Sea, since becoming trapped in ice last August. It began moving south-west, in the general direction of the Siberian coast.
- The London Underground added the West Harrow tube station to serve Harrow, London.
- Japanese Government Railways extended the Echigo Line in the Niigata Prefecture, Japan, with station Sekiya serving the line.
- The association football XV de Novembro was established in Piracicaba, Brazil, with the club named after the date commemorating the establishment of the First Brazilian Republic in 1889.
- Born:
  - Jack Dyer, Australian rules football player and coach for the Richmond Football Club; in Oakleigh, Victoria (d. 2003)
  - Gus Johnson, American jazz musician, drummer for Jay McShann and Ella Fitzgerald; in Tyler, Texas (d. 2000)
  - Arthur Haulot, Belgian journalist, member of the Belgian Resistance during World War II; in Angleur (d. 2005)
  - Riek Schagen (stage name for Geertruida Hendrika Schagen), Dutch actress, best known for her role as Saartje in the long-running popular NCRV television show Swiebertje and film comedies such as Fanfare; in Amersfoort (d. 2008)
- Died: Camille Armand Jules Marie, 81, French Army officer who served in the Franco-Prussian War, and was a major general in the Confederate States Army during the American Civil War (b. 1832)

== November 16, 1913 (Sunday) ==
- Afonso Costa and the Democratic Party won majority of the seats during legislative elections in Portugal.
- Pancho Villa dispatched his forces to Tierra Blanca, 35 miles (56 km) south of Ciudad Juárez, expecting to engage federal troops.
- Mexican President Victoriano Huerta dismissed Minister of the Interior Manuel Garza Aldape, after Garza had urged that Mexico negotiate with the United States.
- Born: Dora de Pédery-Hunt, Hungarian-born Canadian sculptor and designer of the Queen Elizabeth II effigy on Canadian coins; in Budapest, Austria-Hungary (present-day Hungary) (d. 2008)

== November 17, 1913 (Monday) ==
- Alfred Fones established the Fones School of Dental Hygiene in Bridgeport, Connecticut, with the local board of education helping to fund the program. The first class was attended by 34 women and held in Fones' garage behind his office. Graduates of the program participated in preventative dental treatment programs in schools around Bridgeport.
- The Vermilion School of Agriculture opened in Vermilion, Alberta - the first of three agricultural colleges to open in the Canadian province - with an all-male class of 34. The college would expand its programs and campuses over the next few decades, and eventually be renamed Lakeland College in 1975.
- Construction of the National Transcontinental Railway, started in 1903, was completed with the last spike driven west of Cochrane, Ontario. The rail - which ran from Winnipeg to Moncton, New Brunswick - was operated privately until 1923 when it was absorbed into the Canadian National Railway.
- The Grimsby and Immingham Electric Railway opened an electric rail station in Immingham, Lincolnshire and operated it until 1961.
- Died: Mathilde Marchesi, German opera singer, known for her collaboration with the Vienna Conservatory (b. 1821)

== November 18, 1913 (Tuesday) ==
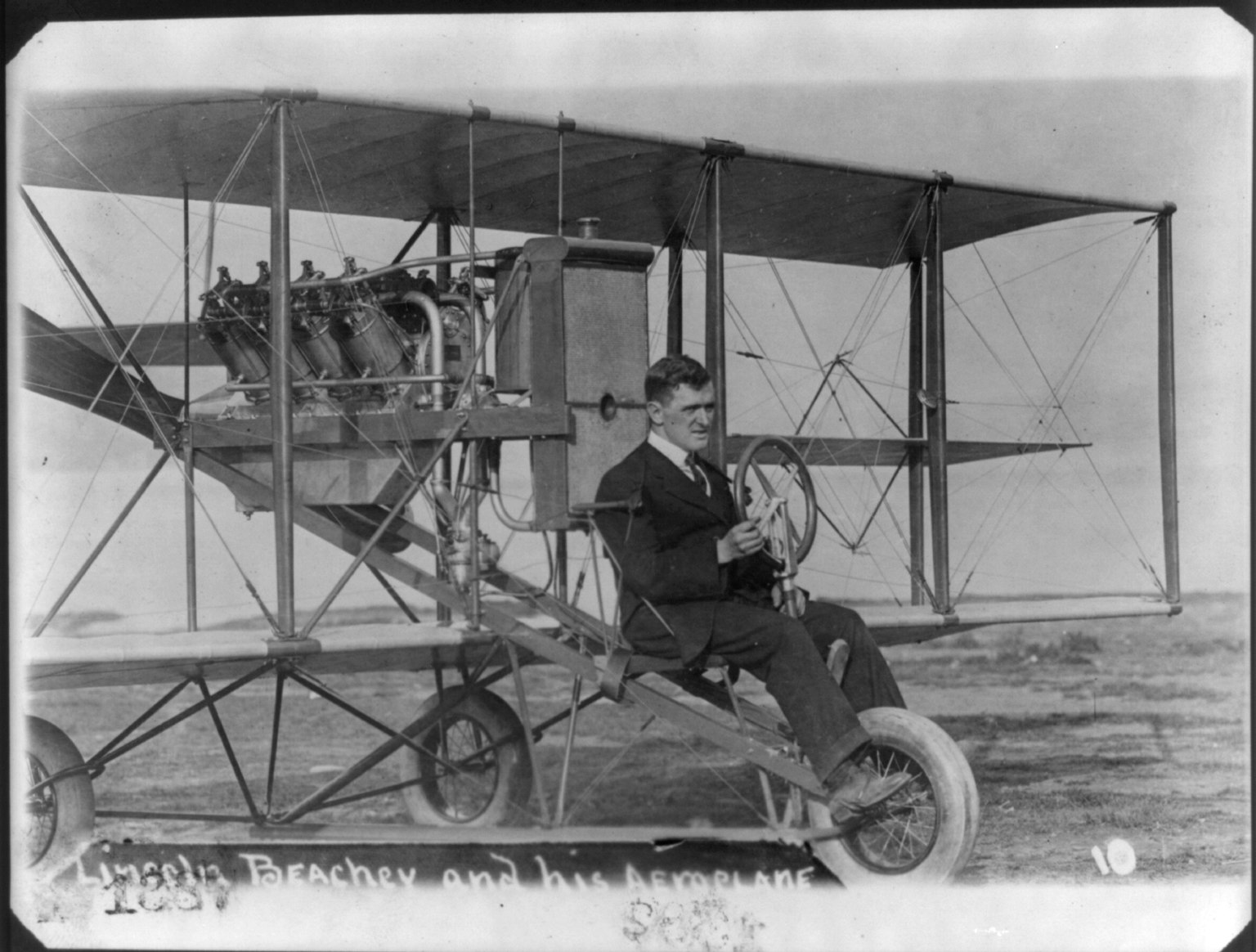
Aviator Lincoln Beachey and his airplane

- Twenty-one coal miners were killed in the explosion of the Alabama Fuel and Iron Company's Mine Number 2 near Acton, Alabama.
- American aviator Lincoln Beachey first performed his inside loop (called the "loop the loop") at an airshow at Naval Air Station North Island, San Diego. Beachey climbed to 3,500 feet (1,066 meters) before turning the airplane down. He brought the machine up at the 1,000-foot mark and completed a 300-foot (91-meter) loop.
- French aviator Maurice Chevillard performed the first somersault loop with an airplane while a passenger was on board, something previously done solo by aviators.
- The play Great Catherine: Whom Glory Still Adores by George Bernard Shaw premiered at the Vaudeville Theatre in London as a starring vehicle for actress Gertrude Kingston.
- Born: Endre Rozsda, Hungarian-born French painter, member of the Surrealism movement; in Mohács, Austria-Hungary (present-day Hungary) (d. 1999)

== November 19, 1913 (Wednesday) ==
- Jack Thompson showed up at his own funeral visitation in Hamilton, Ontario, eight days after he had been believed to have drowned in the sinking of the SS James Carruthers. The body that had washed ashore from Lake Huron had been identified by his bereaved father, Thomas, at a morgue in Goderich, Ontario. In reality, Thompson had not accompanied the ship on its final voyage. The body his father identified was the same height and build, had similar facial features, tattoos (including the initials "J.T."), scars (crossed toes), and other markings on the body. Upon reading his name among the list of known dead in a newspaper while in Toronto, Thompson took a train back to his hometown and walked into his home, where his family was preparing for his burial. The identity of the body mistaken for Thompson remains unknown, and is buried with four other unknown seamen in Goderich.
- The Governor of Pennsylvania, John K. Tener, agreed to serve as the new president of the pro baseball National League.

== November 20, 1913 (Thursday) ==
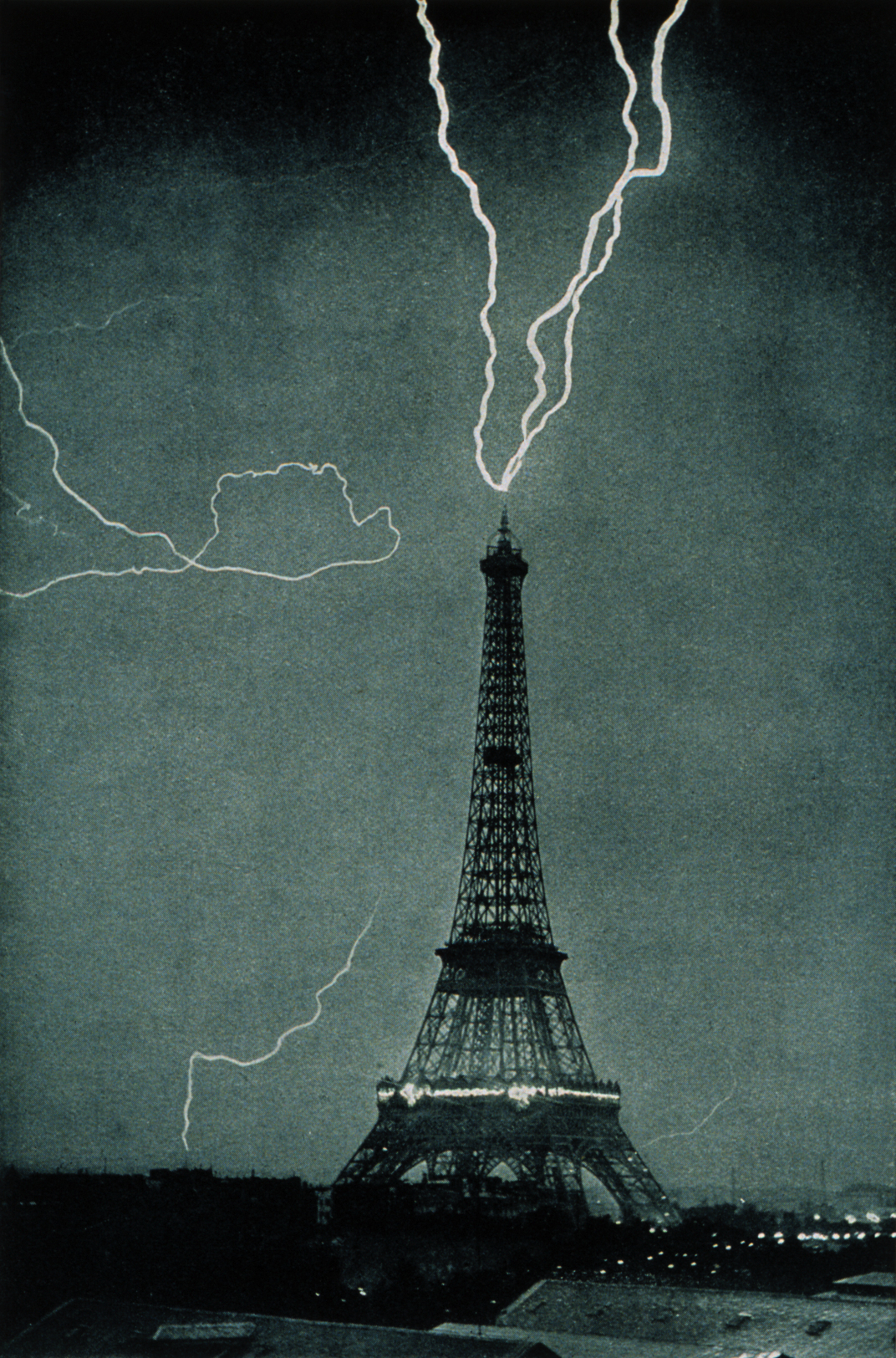
Radio Eiffel

- The Eiffel Tower, made of iron, was used as a radio antenna for wireless transmission and reception by the Paris Observatory. For three weeks, the Paris Observatory and the United States Naval Observatory in Arlington County, Virginia had been attempting to signal each other and "on November 20 the exchange worked well for the first time," in an experiment that continued until March. The New York Times reported that the earlier tests had encountered interference from atmospheric conditions and other radio transmissions, but that on the evening of the 20th, "the beats of the Paris clock, as transmitted by wireless, were compared with the Washington clock for several minutes".
- The Ministry of Agriculture was established in Egypt.
- Born:
  - Judy Canova, American singer and actress, famous for playing an Ozark hick character in various broadcasts and USO tours during World War II; as Juliette Canova, in Starke, Florida (d. 1983)
  - Libertas Schulze-Boysen, French-born German resistance fighter, member of the Red Orchestra group during World War II; as Libertas Viktoria Haas-Haye, in Paris (executed, 1942)
  - Charles Bettelheim, French economist, founder of Center for the Study of Modes of Industrialization (CEMI); in Paris (d. 2006)

== November 21, 1913 (Friday) ==
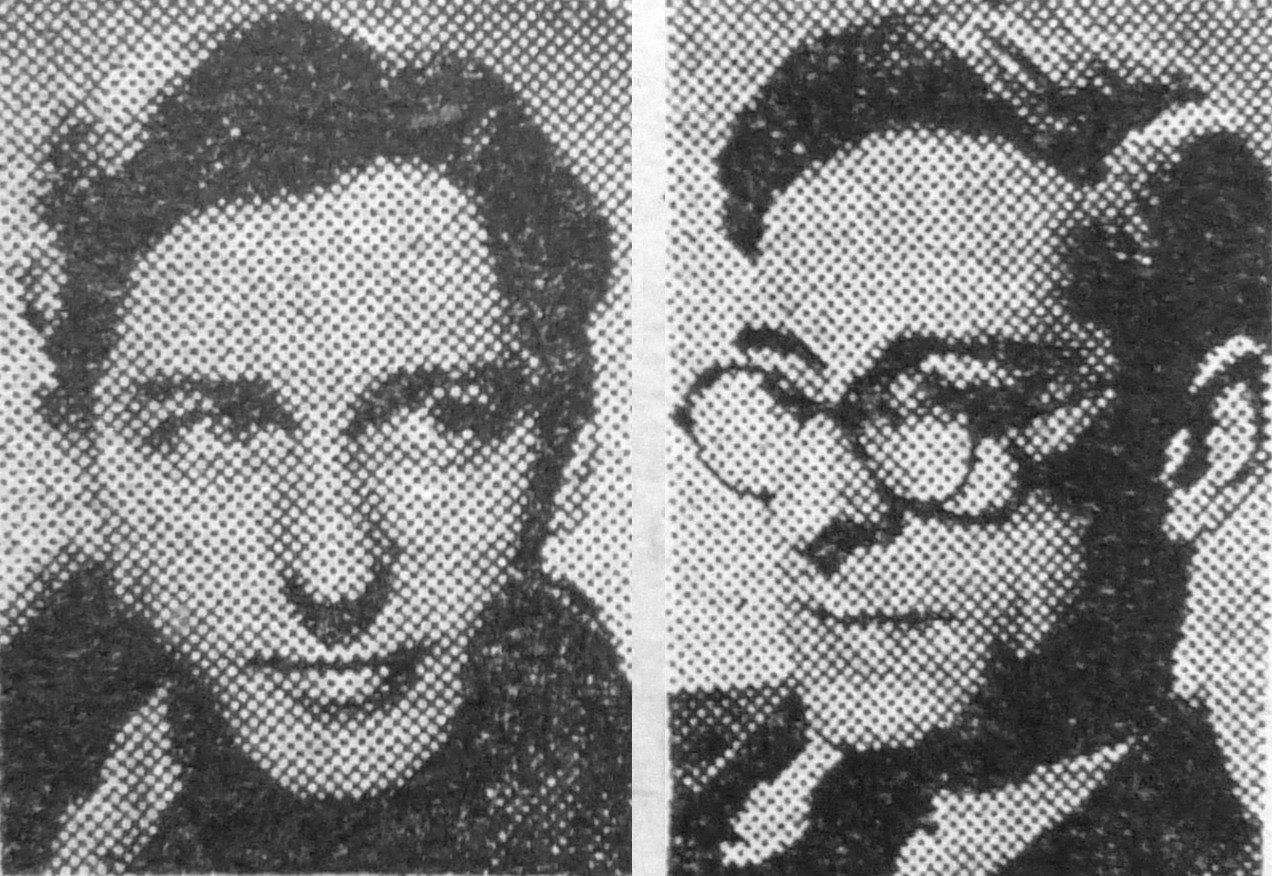
Roy and John Boulting

- The Olds School of Agriculture and Home Economics officially opened on the site of a demonstration farm in Olds, Alberta, the second of three agricultural schools opened by the Alberta Department of Agriculture. The school would expand its programs and campus over decades and is now the Olds College.
- The semiweekly newspaper Cessnock Eagle and South Maitland Recorder began publication in Cessnock, New South Wales, Australia. The last edition was published in 1961.
- Born: John Boulting, English film director (d. 1985) and Roy Boulting, English film director and producer (d. 2001), identical twin brothers who produced films such as Brighton Rock and I'm All Right Jack; in Bray, Berkshire.

== November 22, 1913 (Saturday) ==
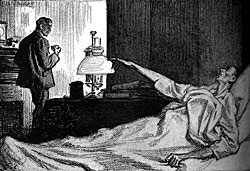
Sherlock Holmes, seemingly on his deathbed in "The Adventure of the Dying Detective".

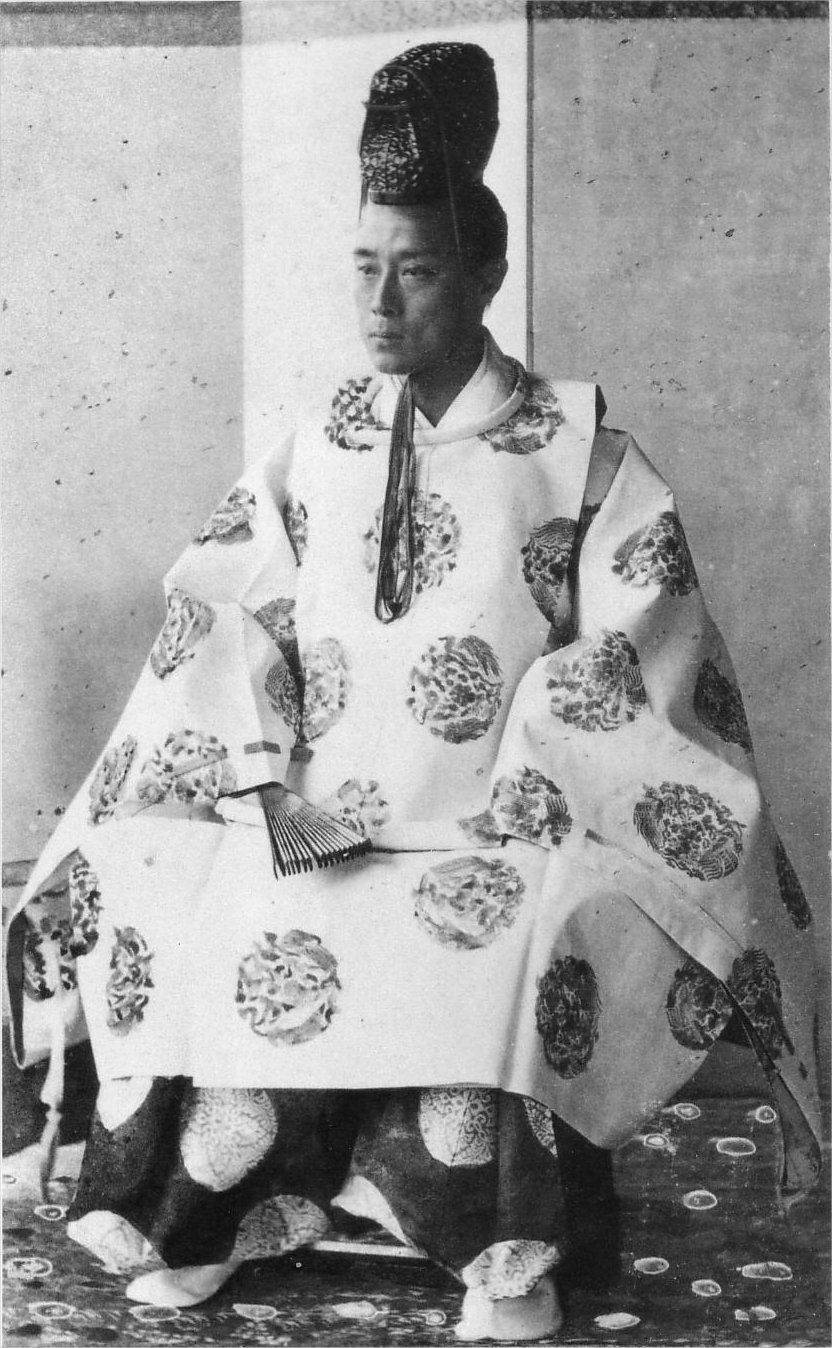
Yoshinobu, the last shogun

- Ten members of the 5th Company of 2nd Upper Rhine Infantry Regiment No. 99 were arrested and charged with leaking secrets of the Zabern Affair to the local press.
- The Sherlock Holmes short story "The Adventure of the Dying Detective" by Sir Arthur Conan Doyle was published for the first time in Collier's Weekly in the United States.
- In the Battle of Tierra Blanca, Pancho Villa's force of 5,500 men engaged 7,000 federal troops under command of José Inés Salazar. It was rumored American journalist and fiction writer Ambrose Bierce was with Villa's army and witnessed the battle.
- The St. Johns Library opened in St. Johns, Portland, Oregon.
- Born:
  - Benjamin Britten, English composer, known for compositions include War Requiem; in Lowestoft, Suffolk (d. 1976)
  - Cecilia Muñoz-Palma, first female Philippine Supreme Court Justice; as Cecilia Muñoz, in Bauan, Philippine Islands Territory (d. 2006)
  - Gardnar Mulloy, American tennis player, five-time Grand Slam doubles champion; in Washington, D.C. (d. 2016)
- Died: Tokugawa Yoshinobu, 76, Japanese noble, the 15th and last leader of the Tokugawa shogunate, who served from 1866 until the Shogunate was abolished in 1868 (b. 1837)

== November 23, 1913 (Sunday) ==
- The first technical institute in Brazil, the Instituto Eletrotécnico e Mecânico de Itajubá, was inaugurated in the city of Itajubá in the Minas Gerais State. Brazil's President Hermes da Fonseca and his Vice President (and successor), Venceslau Brás, presided over the ceremonies. Since 2002, the institution has been the Federal University of Itajubá.
- Born:
  - Raymond Hanson, Australian composer, director of the Sydney Conservatorium of Music; in Sydney (d. 1976)
  - William Krehm, Canadian activist, co-founder of the Committee on Monetary and Economic Reform; in Toronto (d. 2019)

== November 24, 1913 (Monday) ==
- A coalition of liberal parties in Bulgaria, led by Prime Minister Vasil Radoslavov, won a plurality of seats (95 of 204) in the Narodno Sabranie in Bulgaria.
- Recently defeated during his campaign for re-election as Governor of South Carolina, Coleman Livingston Blease issued pardons and paroles for 100 convicts. These included 28 men serving life terms for murder, and another 28 incarcerated for manslaughter, and marked a total of 882 persons whom he had released from prison. The pardons took effect on the day before Thanksgiving.
- The American crime film Traffic in Souls went into wide release, starring Jane Gail and Ethel Grandin and directed by George Loane Tucker. It became the top-grossing film of the year, grossing just under $1 million. The film is credited for establishing the narrative style of Hollywood film and was preserved by the Library of Congress and the National Film Registry.
- A rail station opened in Brighton to serve the Seaford railway line in Adelaide, Australia.
- Born:
  - Geraldine Fitzgerald, Irish-born American stage and film actress, known for the play Heartbreak House and the film Dark Victory, Academy Award for Best Supporting Actress winner for Wuthering Heights; in Greystones, County Wicklow, United Kingdom of Great Britain and Ireland (present-day Ireland) (d. 2005)
  - Gisela Mauermayer, German athlete, 1936 Summer Olympics gold medalist in the discus; in Munich, German Empire (present-day Germany) (d. 1995)
  - Howard Duff, American radio actor for the title role in Sam Spade, and in film for Brute Force and The Naked City; in Charleston, Washington (d. 1990)

== November 25, 1913 (Tuesday) ==
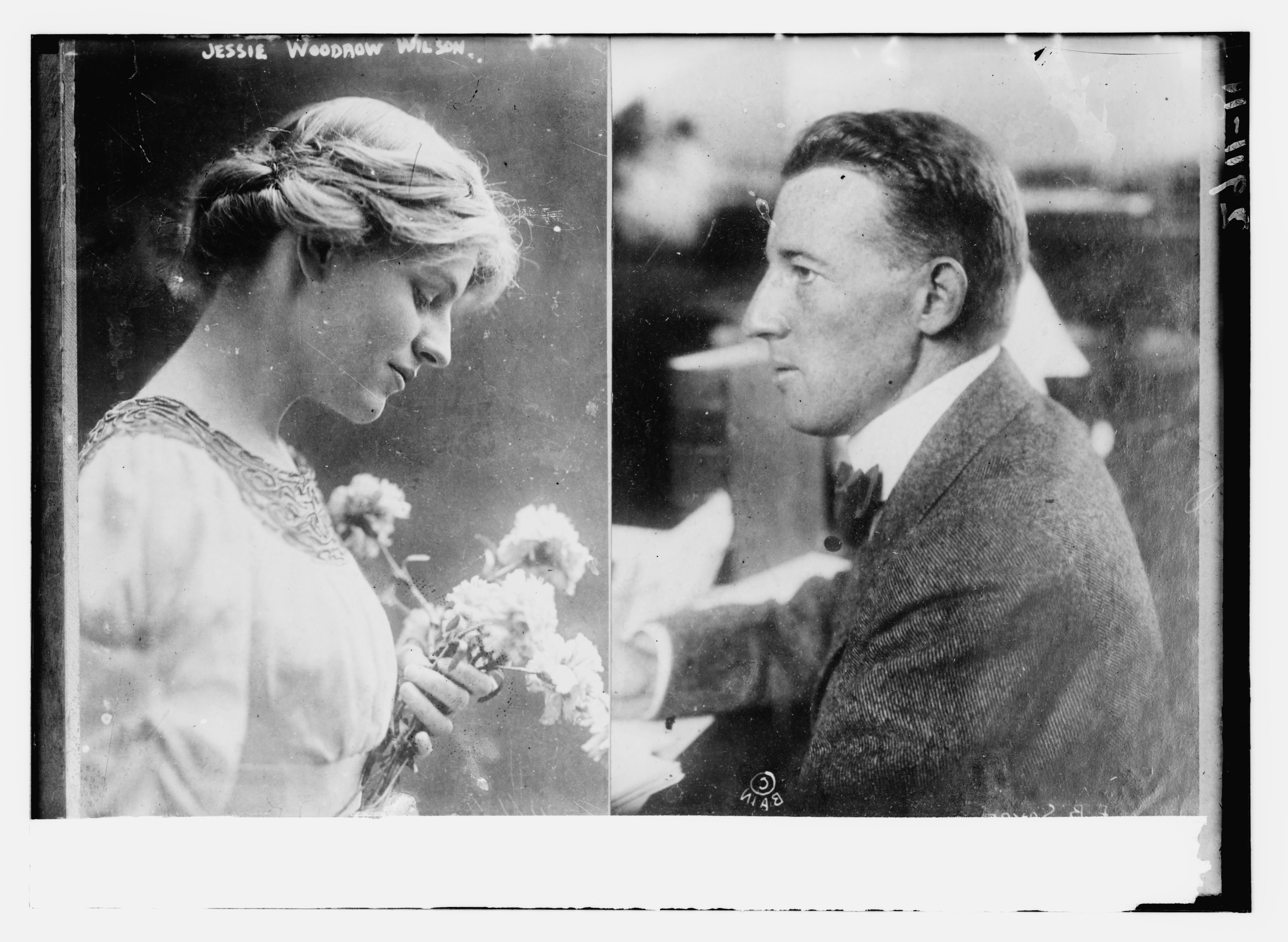
Jessie Wilson, daughter of U.S. President Woodrow Wilson (left) and Francis B. Sayre (right)

- On the fourth day of fighting in Tierra Blanca, rebel leader Pancho Villa ordered his cavalry to charge the center of the attacking Mexican Army's line. At the same time, Rodolfo Fierro, Villa's second-in-command, used a locomotive filled with dynamite and percussion caps to ram into the federal soldiers' train cars. Both aggressive counterattacks forced the federal army to retreat, with 1,000 casualties.
- The Irish Volunteers were established by acclamation at a huge public meeting at the Rotunda Hospital in Dublin "to secure and maintain the rights and liberties common to the whole people of Ireland."
- French aviator Raymonde de Laroche flew 325 kilometres (202 mi) solo in four hours, winning the 1913 Femina Cup for the longest solo flight by a woman that year.
- In a wedding held in the White House, Jessie Woodrow Wilson, daughter of U.S. President Woodrow Wilson, was married to Francis B. Sayre.
- Panama became a signatory to the 1910 Buenos Aires Convention, a copyright treaty, the second country in Latin America to do so. Guatemala had been the first to sign, on March 28, 1913.
- Born:
  - Lewis Thomas, American physician and essayist, 1981 National Book Award winner; in Flushing, Queens, New York City (d. 1993)
  - Jack Davies, English screenwriter, known for Those Magnificent Men in their Flying Machines; as John Davies, in Fulham, London (d. 1994)
- Died: Robert Stawell Ball, 73, Irish astronomer who developed the screw theory used for vectors in algebra (b. 1840)

== November 26, 1913 (Wednesday) ==
- Royal Navy battleship Warspite was launched by Devonport Shipyard in Plymouth to serve in World War I including the Battle of Jutland.
- Phi Sigma Sigma, the first collegiate nonsectarian sorority, was founded at Hunter College, New York City. It was the first women's fraternity of its time to allow membership of women from all faiths and backgrounds.
- Police in New York City arrested José Santos Zelaya, the former President of Nicaragua, after he had been convicted of murder, in absentia, by a court in Managua. Zelaya was sleeping on the sixth floor of an apartment house on West End Avenue. After a few days in jail, Zelaya would be released on bond and, on Christmas Eve, would board the ship Lorraine and sail back to Spain.
- Died: Frances Julia Wedgwood, 80, British writer who assisted Charles Darwin in translating the works of Carl Linnaeus (b. 1833)

== November 27, 1913 (Thursday) ==
- Hungarian-born politician Iván Skerlecz was proclaimed ban (viceroy) of the Kingdom of Croatia-Slavonia, where he called for parliamentary elections.
- Royal Navy battleship Emperor of India was launched by Vickers Limited in Barrow-in-Furness, as the second in a class to serve in World War I including the Battle of Jutland.
- The famous Hotel Bellevue Palace was reopened in Bern, Switzerland.
- Construction on the Pomeroy House began in Sydney. It was added to the New South Wales State Heritage Register in 1999.
- Born: Robert Dougall, English newscaster, anchor for the BBC Newsroom and author of several bestselling books on the topic of ornithology; in London (d. 1999)

== November 28, 1913 (Friday) ==
- Prussian soldiers occupying Saverne, Germany arrested and imprisoned 26 demonstrators without probable cause, after a crowd of demonstrators made their angriest protests up to that time over Lt. von Forstner's offensive remarks and the insufficiency of the discipline taken against the young officer. When the crowd ignored warnings to disperse, the soldiers charged the crowd, seized whomever they could detain, and imprisoned the 26 in the basement of the Rohan Palace. Martial law was declared in the town soon after.
- Pancho Villa gained control of Chihuahua City, Mexico and established a base of operations in the city for División del Norte.
- New rules to speed up the game of ice hockey were tested for the first time in a game, as the Pacific Coast Hockey Association (PCHA) implemented ideas by Frank Patrick, including an end to the prohibition against passing the puck forward beyond one's own side of the rink. Previously, players could only pass the puck forward until they reached the blue line that marked the neutral zone, after which they had to maintain possession while they skated forward, and could only pass to a player behind them. The penalties that resulted from frequent infractions of the rule delayed the games. Patrick's idea, which would later be accepted by the NHL forerunner, the National Hockey Association, was to allow forward passing by either team in the neutral zone. In a preseason exhibition at Victoria Arena in Victoria, British Columbia, the Victoria Aristocrats beat the Vancouver Millionaires 4 to 3 in overtime.
- Died: George B. Post, 75, American architect, noted proponent of the Beaux-Arts tradition and designer of many public New York City buildings including the New York Stock Exchange (b. 1837)

== November 29, 1913 (Saturday) ==
- German battlecruiser Lützow was launched by Schichau-Werke in Danzig to serve in the Imperial German Navy during World War I including the Battle of Jutland.
- The International Fencing Federation was recognized by the International Olympic Committee as the world governing body of fencing.
- The Hamilton Tigers defeated Toronto Parkdale 44 to 2 in the fifth Grey Cup, the championship of Canadian football.

== November 30, 1913 (Sunday) ==
- The Sprague, famous as "the world's largest steam-powered sternwheeler towboat," with the power to push as many as 56 loaded barges, created an environmental disaster when it wrecked on the Mississippi River, striking a stone dike on one of the many river islands, Island Number 30, near Osceola, Arkansas. In addition to destroying 16 coal barges outright and sinking 29 others that it was pushing, the Sprague caused the barges' 53,200 tons of coal to pour into the river, temporarily forming a new river island
- The Erie Philharmonic orchestra company was established in Erie, Pennsylvania, but would only last for about two years.
- Born:
  - John McCaffery, American television game show host, known for One Minute Please; in Moscow, Idaho (d. 1983)
  - David Curwen, British rail engineer, designer of the ridable miniature railway; in Sydenham, Kent, England (d. 2011)
