= July 1913 =

Month of 1913

<<	July 1913					>>
Su	Mo	Tu	We	Th	Fr	Sa
		1	2	3	4	5
6	7	8	9	10	11	12
13	14	15	16	17	18	19
20	21	22	23	24	25	26
27	28	29	30	31

The following events occurred in July 1913:

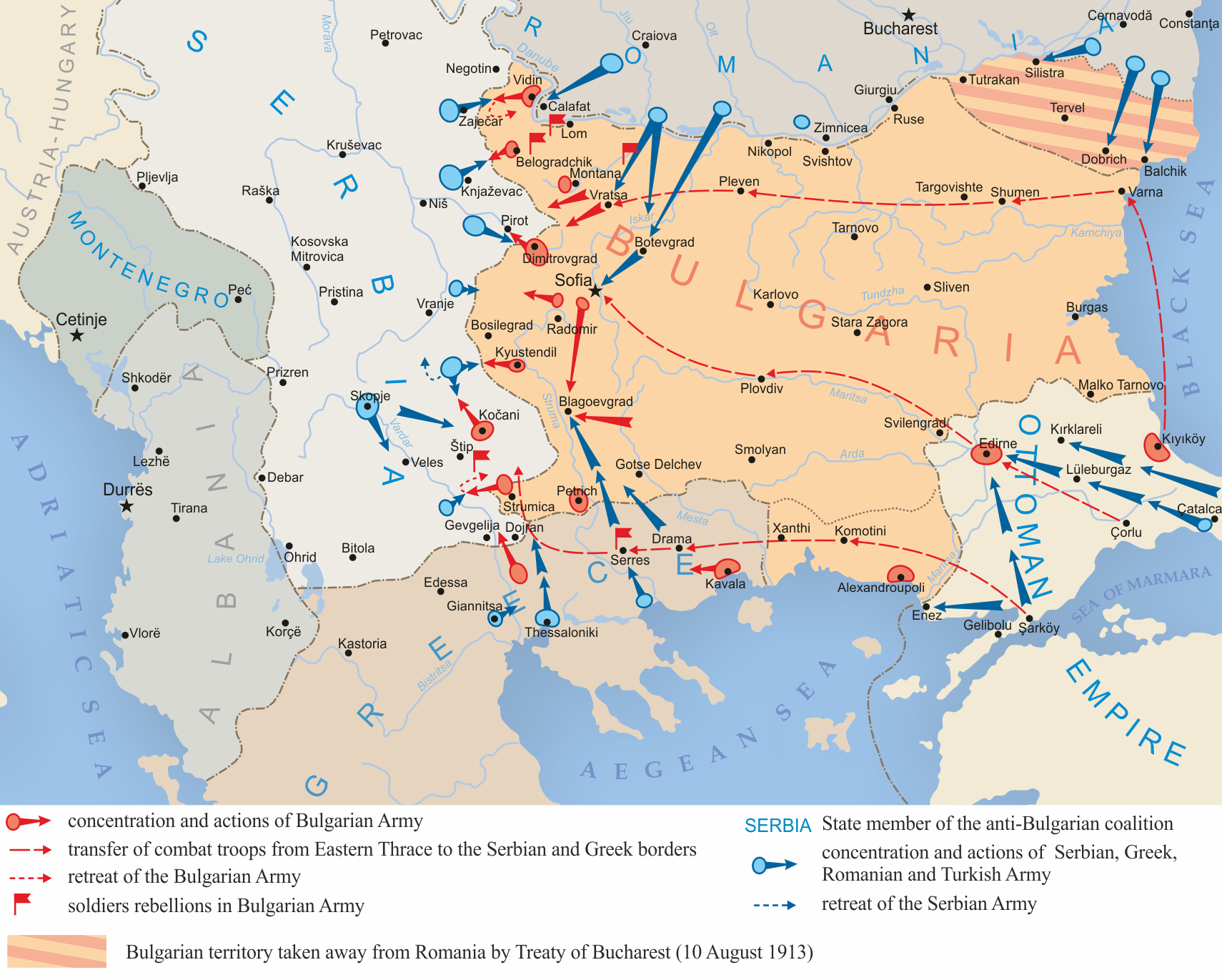
July 11 and July 12, 1913: Romania and Turkey invade Bulgaria, which was already fighting the Second Balkan War with Greece and Serbia

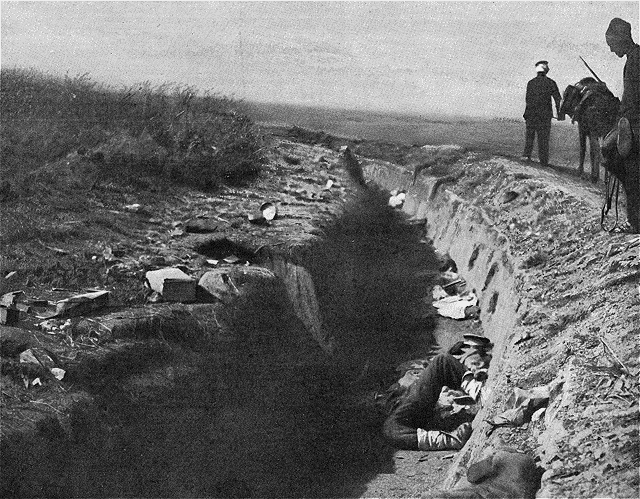
July 4, 1913: Bulgarians defeated at Battle of Kilkis

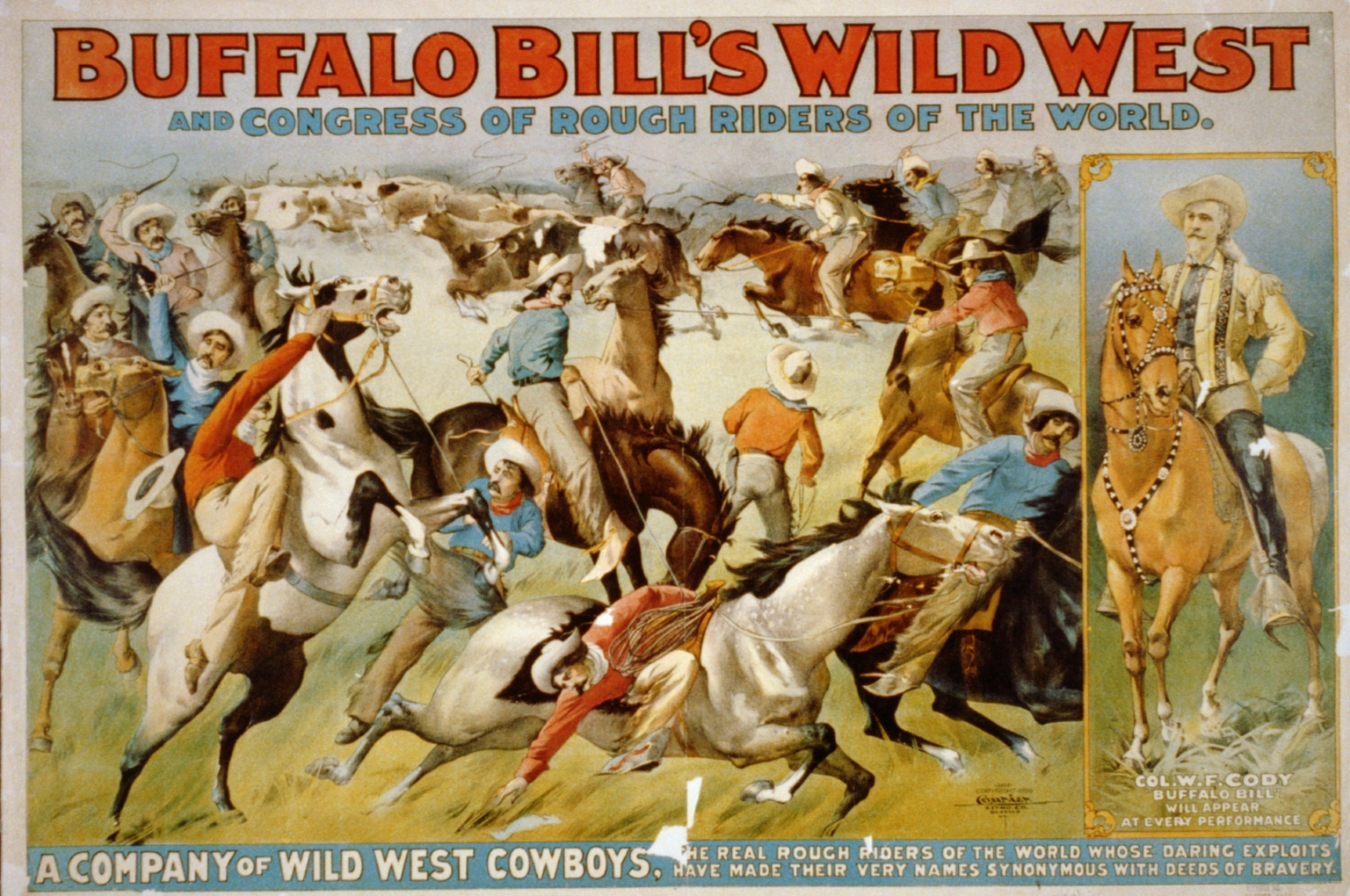
July 23, 1913: Bankruptcy auction brings end to Buffalo Bill's Wild West Show

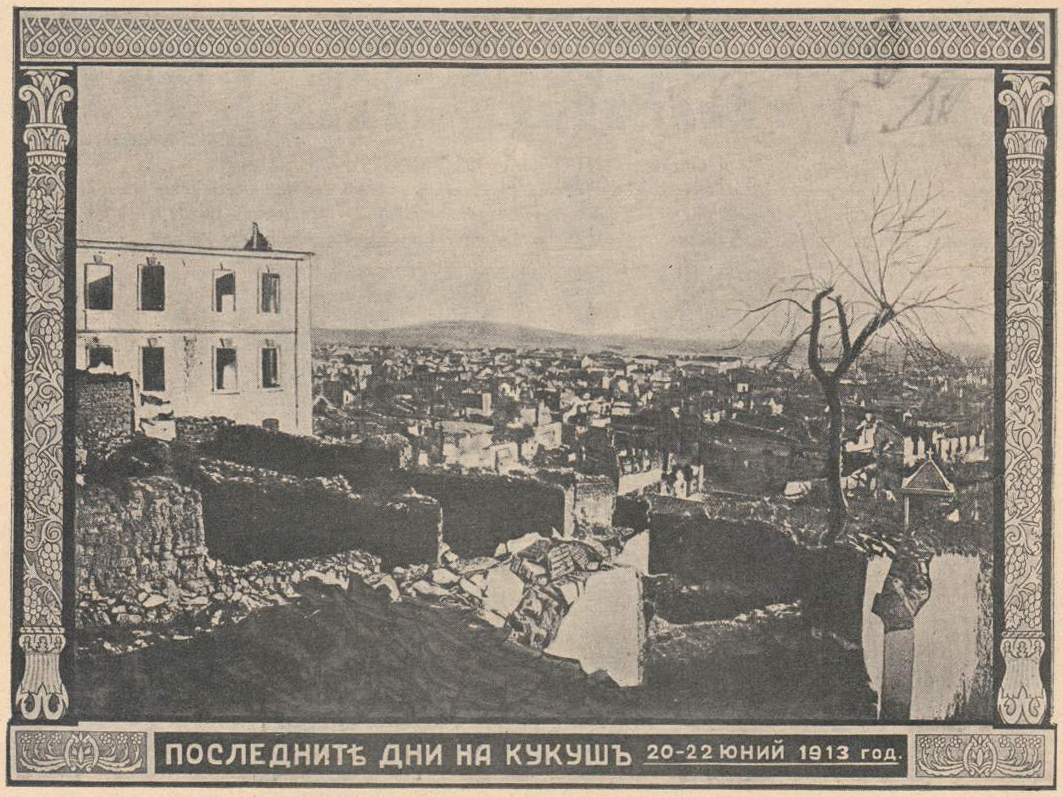
the ruins of Kilkis

== July 1, 1913 (Tuesday) ==
- At a reunion to commemorate the fiftieth anniversary of the Battle of Gettysburg, more than fifty thousand (53,407) surviving veterans of the Union and Confederate armies assembled at Gettysburg, Pennsylvania to set up tents. Eight of the aged veterans had died by the time President Wilson's speech to the gathering. The reunion ended on July 6.
- Vilhjalmur Stefansson set off from Seattle, Washington for a three-and-a-half-year exploration of the area between Alaska and the North Pole.
- During the Labour Unity Conferences held in Wellington, the industrial and political wings of each movement were recommended to split into their own organizations. As a result New Zealand Socialist Party officially dissolved and reformed as the Social Democratic Party, a precursor to the New Zealand Labour Party formed three years later.
- The Pretoria Regiment of the South African Army was established.
- Some 165 U.S custom districts were consolidated into 49, including the one for New Bedford, Massachusetts although it retain its status as a port of entry into the United States.
- A rail station opened in Newport, Isle of Wight, England to serve the Isle of Wight Central Railway. The rail station was active for only a decade and closed in 1923.
- A rail station opened in Dartford, Kent, England to serve the Gravesend West Line.
- American jewelers began the use of the metric carat as the standard for weighing of gemstones and pearls, with a carat being equal to 200 milligrams. The unit was slightly less than the English carat of 205.3035 milligrams.
- L. Frank Baum published his seventh Land of Oz book titled The Patchwork Girl of Oz, which restarted the entire series after The Emerald City of Oz.
- Daily newspaper Tageblatt began publication in Esch-sur-Alzette, Luxembourg, becoming the second most popular paper in the country behind the Luxemburger Wort.
- The city of Dipolog, Zamboanga del Norte, Philippines was established.
- The city of Millville, Florida was incorporated.
- Malm Municipality was established in Norway. It dissolved in 1964 when it became part of Verran Municipality.
- Born:
  - Paramasiva Prabhakar Kumaramangalam, Indian army officer, Chief of the Indian Army Staff 1966 to 1969; in Kumaramangalam, Madras Province, British India (present-day Tamil Nadu, India) (d. 2000)
  - André Tollet, French resistance leader, central leader of the committee involved in the Liberation of Paris in 1944; in Paris, France (d. 2001)

== July 2, 1913 (Wednesday) ==
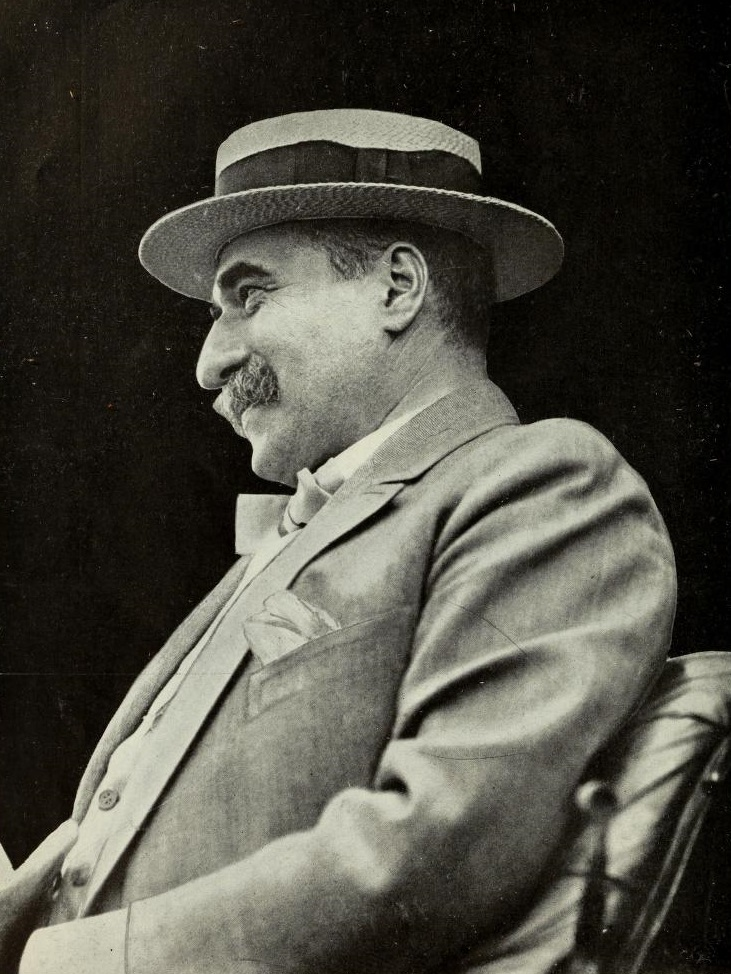
Con artist David Lamar

- Wall Street con man David Lamar testified before a United States Senate subcommittee that he had frequently impersonated Congressmen during telephone conversations in order to gain an advantage. The United States Department of Justice reluctantly concluded that there was no federal law under which Lamar could be prosecuted. Although federal law made it a felony "to impersonate an officer of the United States," the Supreme Court of the United States had ruled that members of Congress were "not officers of the United States, but of the particular States from which they come."
- Upon recommendation of the city Board of Health, the city of Cincinnati seized control of eight ice plants whose workers had gone on strike during the hot summer. The strike settled four days later.
- The Crocker Land Expedition, on the ship Diana, departed from New York City toward the North Pole for a three-year exploration project.
- French aviator Marcel Brindejonc des Moulinais set a new distance record for an airplane, flying 3,100 miles from Paris to Saint Petersburg.
- The Catholic League was established to reconcile Protestant and Catholic faiths in England.

== July 3, 1913 (Thursday) ==
- The fiftieth anniversary of "Pickett's Charge", turning point in the Battle of Gettysburg in the American Civil War, was re-enacted by the survivors of the original battle.
- The Kingdom of Romania issued an order for mobilization of its armies in preparation of an invasion of Bulgaria.
- Born: Dorothy Kilgallen, American journalist, columnist for the New York Journal-American and panelist on the television show What's My Line?; in Chicago, United States (d. 1965)

== July 4, 1913 (Friday) ==
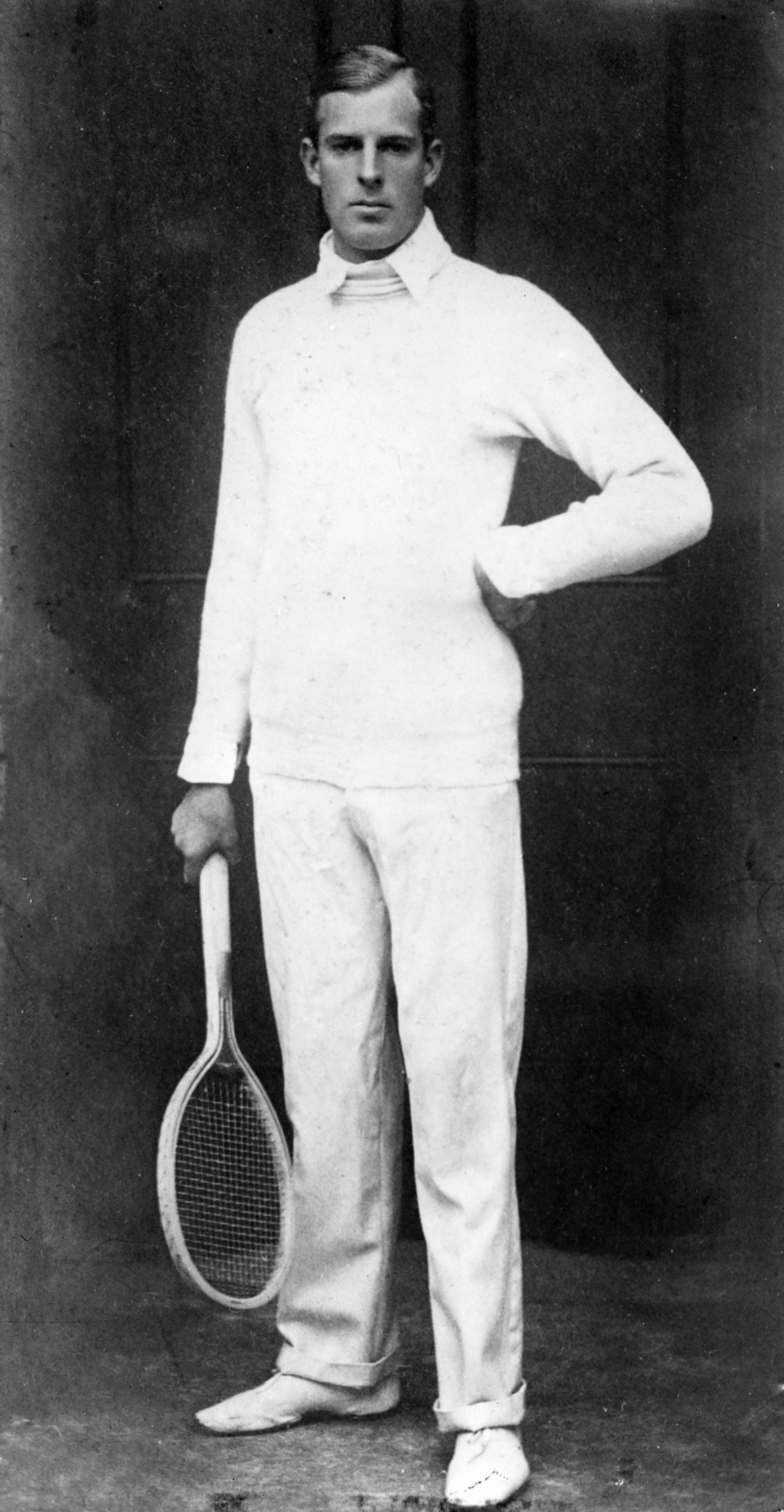
Tennis player Tony Wilding

- As the Second Balkan War continued, Greek and Serbian armies were successful in routing attacking Bulgarian troops, at Kilkis, Central Macedonia, which would later become part of Greek territory.
- The Russian village of Astradamovka, located in the Alatyr Oblast (later the Ulyanovsk Oblast), was destroyed by a fire which killed 154 peasants.
- Major General Erich von Falkenhayn was appointed as the new German Minister of War after General Josias von Heeringen resigned.
- Anthony Wilding of England won his fourth consecutive Wimbledon championship, ending the hope of American Maurice McLoughlin to become the first foreigner to win the Wimbledon finals. Wilding overwhelmed McLoughlin in three straight sets, 8-6, 6-3 and 10-8.
- American race car driver Harry Knight was killed along with his mechanic Milton McAllis when their car blew a tire during a race in Columbus, Ohio and rolled over twice.
- The opening of a new county courthouse in Ventura, California kicked off two days of Fourth of July celebrations that saw 20,000 people attend.
- Died: Alfred Lyttelton, 56, British politician and cricket player, wicket-keeper for the England cricket team from 1879 to 1898, Secretary of State for the Colonies 1903 to 1905 (b. 1857)

== July 5, 1913 (Saturday) ==
- Three days of rioting by miners in the Rand District of South Africa halted after the government agreed to bring legislation for improvement of working conditions. The night before, Johannesburg police had fired their guns into a crowd of protesters who ignored orders to disperse, killing 40.
- The Ottoman Empire announced that it would not intervene in the war against Bulgaria on the condition that Bulgaria relinquish its claims for indemnity from the empire from the First Balkan War.
- The United States Postal Service began to segregate black postal clerks from white clerks.
- Died: Prince Arisugawa Takehito, 51, Japanese Imperial Navy Admiral and head of the Shinnōke branch of the Imperial House of Japan (b. 1862)

== July 6, 1913 (Sunday) ==
- English clergyman Henry Beeching delivered what would become a widely republished sermon at the Norwich Cathedral in the British city of Norwich, describing the faith of the late George Borrow.
- Born: Vance Trimble, American journalist, celebrated investigative reporter for the Howard-Scripps newspaper chain, recipient of the Pulitzer Prize for National Reporting in 1960; in Harrison, Arkansas, United States (d. 2021)
- Died: J. C. Williamson, 67, American-Australian actor and theatrical producer, founder of J. C. Williamson Ltd. (b. 1845)

== July 7, 1913 (Monday) ==
- The Irish Home Rule bill passed on its third reading in the British House of Commons, 352-243. The measure was sent to the House of Lords, which rejected it on July 15.
- Mexican-American folk hero and outlaw Gregorio Cortez was freed from the Texas State Penitentiary in Huntsville, Texas, where he had served eight and one half years, following a pardon issued by Governor Oscar Branch Colquitt.
- Born: Pinetop Perkins, American blues musician who played piano for Robert Nighthawk, Muddy Waters, and The Legendary Blues Band; as Joseph William Perkins, in Belzoni, Mississippi, United States (d. 2011)
- Died: E. Burd Grubb, 71, U.S. Army officer and regiment commander during the Battle of Chancellorsville and the Siege of Petersburg during the American Civil War, later the U.S. Ambassador to Spain (b. 1841)

== July 8, 1913 (Tuesday) ==
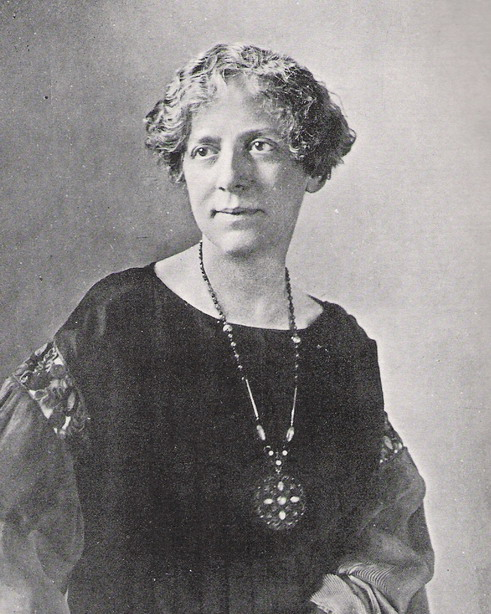
Pearl Curran, channeler of Patience Worth

- Andrew Fisher retained his leadership of the Australian Labor Party during the party's leadership vote, defeating challengers William Higgs and Billy Hughes.
- Trainmen and conductors of most of the railroads in the eastern United States voted 72,473 to 4,210 in favor of going on strike for higher wages, tying up the nation's commerce and travel.
- The Welsh Disestablishment Bill passed its third reading in the House of Commons and was sent to the House of Lords for consideration.
- British yacht Vivid ran aground and wrecked at the island of Colonsay off the coast of Scotland while en route from Glasgow to Stornoway on her maiden voyage as a civilian training ship.
- Pearl Curran, a St. Louis housewife who was experimenting with a Ouija board, began reporting the communications of "Patience Worth", whom Curran said had been an Englishwoman who had lived in Dorset more than 200 years earlier, during the 17th century, and had been killed by Indians after crossing the ocean to America. For the next 24 years, until her death in 1937, Mrs. Curran would publish novels and poems attributed to her communications with Patience Worth.
- Born:
  - Walter Kerr, American writer and theater critic, columnist for The New York Times; in Evanston, Illinois, United States (d. 1996)
  - Bill Thompson, American actor, known for his voice work for the cartoon character Droopy for MGM and for the Walt Disney animated films; as William Thompson, in Terre Haute, Indiana, United States (d. 1971)
- Died: Louis Hémon, 32, French novelist who moved to Canada, was killed after being struck by a train in Chapleau, Ontario. His novel Maria Chapdelaine was published after his death, and brought him posthumous fame. (b. 1880)

== July 9, 1913 (Wednesday) ==
- China's National Assembly ratified a treaty with Russia, relinquishing its claims on Mongolia.
- Born: Ted Grant, South African-British activist, founder of Militant and Socialist Appeal in the United Kingdom; as Isaac Blank, in Germiston, Transvaal, Union of South Africa (present-day Gauteng, South Africa) (d. 2006)

== July 10, 1913 (Thursday) ==
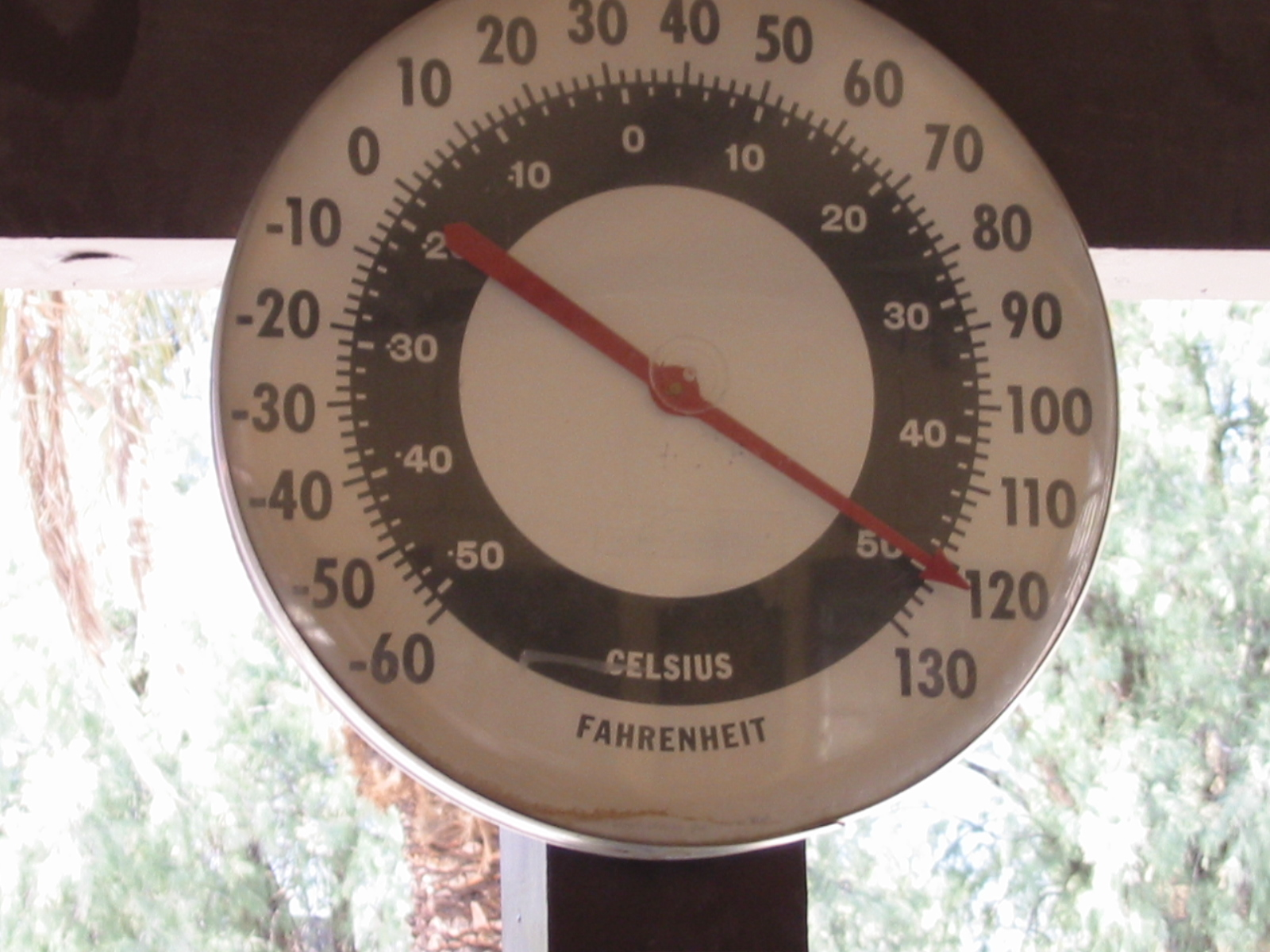
A cooler July day at Furnace Creek in 2005

- Romania declares war on Bulgaria.
- This afternoon, the United States Weather Bureau recorded the highest ever ambient air temperature of 134 °F (56.7 °C) at Greenland Ranch (modern-day Furnace Creek) in Death Valley. The record's validity was later challenged, and in 2020 a temperature of 54.4 °C (129.9 °F) was recorded at the same location, making it the world's highest verified air temperature, subject to confirmation.
- Born: Salvador Espriu, Spanish poet, known for poetry collections including La pell de brau and D'una vella i encerclada terra; as Salvador Espriu i Castelló, in Santa Coloma de Farners, Spain (d. 1985)
- Died: Hayashi Tadasu, 63, Foreign Minister of Japan from 1906 to 1912 (b. 1850)

== July 11, 1913 (Friday) ==
- With the army of Bulgaria already engaged in a two-front fight with Greece and Serbia, troops from the Kingdom of Romania crossed the Danube river for its own invasion of Bulgaria.
- Born: Kofi Abrefa Busia, Prime Minister of Ghana 1969-1972; in Wenchi, the Gold Coast (present-day Ghana) (d. 1978)
- Died: Redmond Berry, 46, Irish judge, Lord Chancellor of Ireland from 1911 to 1913 (b. 1866)

== July 12, 1913 (Saturday) ==
- The Jiangxi province declared its independence from China, and the provincial assembly authorized Li Lieh-chun to lead a fight against the national government.
- The day after Romania had invaded Bulgaria from the north, Turkey attacked from the south and moved into Thrace.
- German battlecruiser Derfflinger was launched by Blohm & Voss in Hamburg as part of the battlecruiser class used during World War I, including the Battle of Jutland.
- Albert Einstein was invited to become a member of the Prussian Academy of Sciences with Max Planck and Walther Nernst traveling to Zürich to make the offer in person. With the invitation came a full professorship at the Friedrich Wilhelm University in Berlin, with a high salary "without any teaching obligations," and the position of Director of the new Institute of Theoretical Physics of the Kaiser Wilhelm Society.
- The Pacific Highway opened in British Columbia as a gravel road, connecting Surrey, British Columbia to Blaine, Washington. The highway was paved in 1923.
- The Abattoirs railway station opened to serve the Northfield railway line north of Adelaide, Australia.
- The historic Grove Park Inn opened in Asheville, North Carolina.
- King Peter of Serbia established the Medal for Bravery to be awarded to officers and soldiers demonstrating courage of the battlefield.
- The city of Zapala, Argentina was established.
- Born:
  - Willis Lamb, American physicist, 1955 Nobel Prize in Physics laureate for his work on quantum electrodynamics, in Los Angeles, United States (d. 2008)
  - Mildred Cohn, American biochemist, recipient of the U.S. National Medal of Science for her research into enzyme catalysis; in New York City, United States (d. 2009)
  - Syarif Hamid, Indonesian noble, eighth monarch of the Pontianak Sultanate on the island of Borneo; in Pontianak, Dutch East Indies (present-day Indonesia) (d. 1978)
  - Manohar Malgonkar, Indian writer, author of A Bend in the Ganges and The Devil's Wind, in Jagalbet, Karwar, Princely State of Mysore, British India (present-day Uttara Kannada, India) (d. 2010)

== July 13, 1913 (Sunday) ==
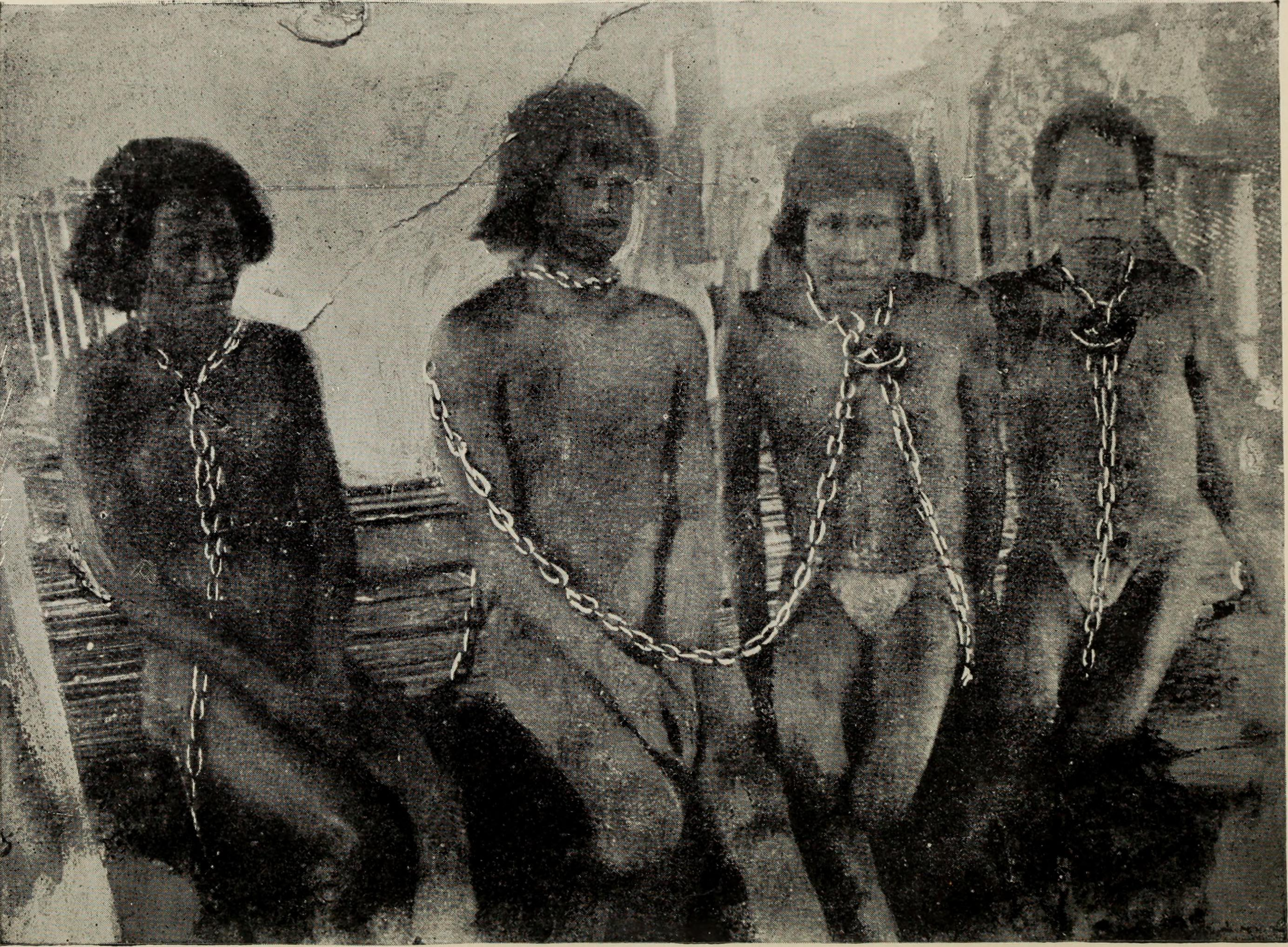
A photograph from Roger Casement's report

- The final report by Irish diplomat Roger Casement, on the atrocities of the Peruvian Amazon Company against the indigenous people in its employ, was published by the British House of Commons.
- French aviator Léon Letort set a new record for nonstop flight, exceeding 500 miles and finishing at 590 miles upon landing in Berlin after setting off from Paris nine hours earlier
- Two weeks after the start of the Second Balkan War between Romania and Bulgaria, the first of more than 11,500 within the Romanian Army was diagnosed. The epidemic would kill more than 1,600 soldiers and officers, while relatively few Romanians would die in combat.
- Born:
  - Mærsk Mc-Kinney Møller, Danish industrialist, chairman of the Maersk shipping corporation 1940 to 2003; in Hellerup, Copenhagen, Denmark (d. 2012)
  - Bryan Hextall, Canadian hockey player, right winger for the New York Rangers from 1933 to 1948, in Grenfell, Saskatchewan, Canada (d. 1984)

== July 14, 1913 (Monday) ==
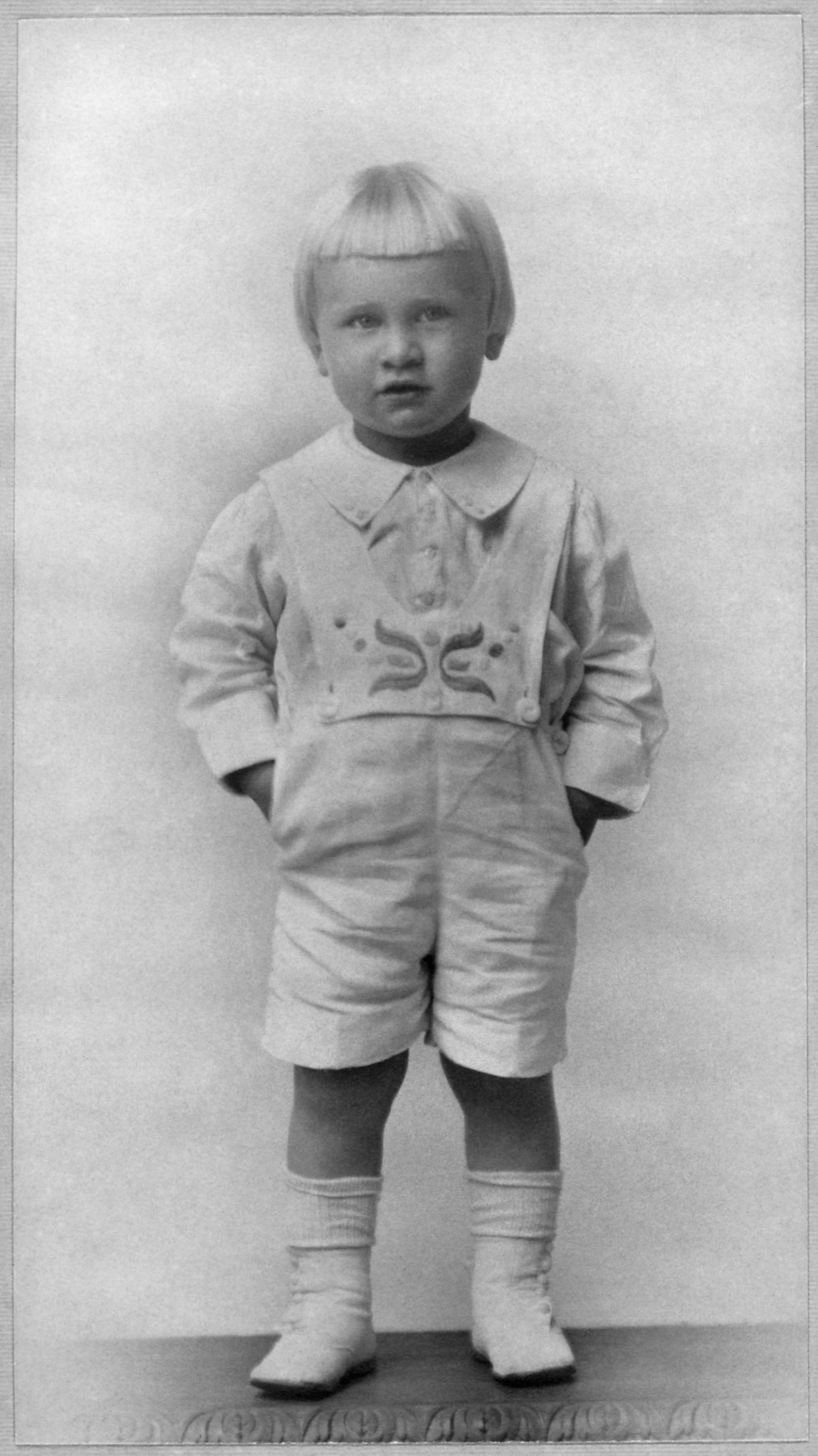
President Gerald Ford (then Leslie Lynch King) as a young child

- A nationwide strike of railroad employees was averted by negotiations at the White House, which included U.S. President Woodrow Wilson, Congressional leaders and the Secretary of Labor, as well as representatives of the railroads and the workers' unions. Management and labor settled their differences in light of an understanding that United States Congress would approve an amendment of the Erdman Arbitration Act. Passage of the bill and its signing into law were accomplished the next day.
- The British House of Commons passed a bill abolishing plural voting, on the third reading, by a margin of 293-222.
- The historic Hotel Polonia Palace opened on Jerusalem Avenue in Warsaw.
- The association football club Cruzeiro was established in Cachoeirinha, Brazil.
- Born: Gerald R. Ford, American politician, President of the United States from 1974 to 1977, Vice President of the United States from 1973 to 1974; as Leslie Lynch King Jr., in Omaha, Nebraska, United States. After his parents' divorce and the remarriage of his mother, he was renamed Gerald Rudolph Ford. (d. 2006)
- Died: John Bannon, 83, Irish-born American priest and chaplain in the Confederate States Army during the American Civil War (b. 1829)

== July 15, 1913 (Tuesday) ==
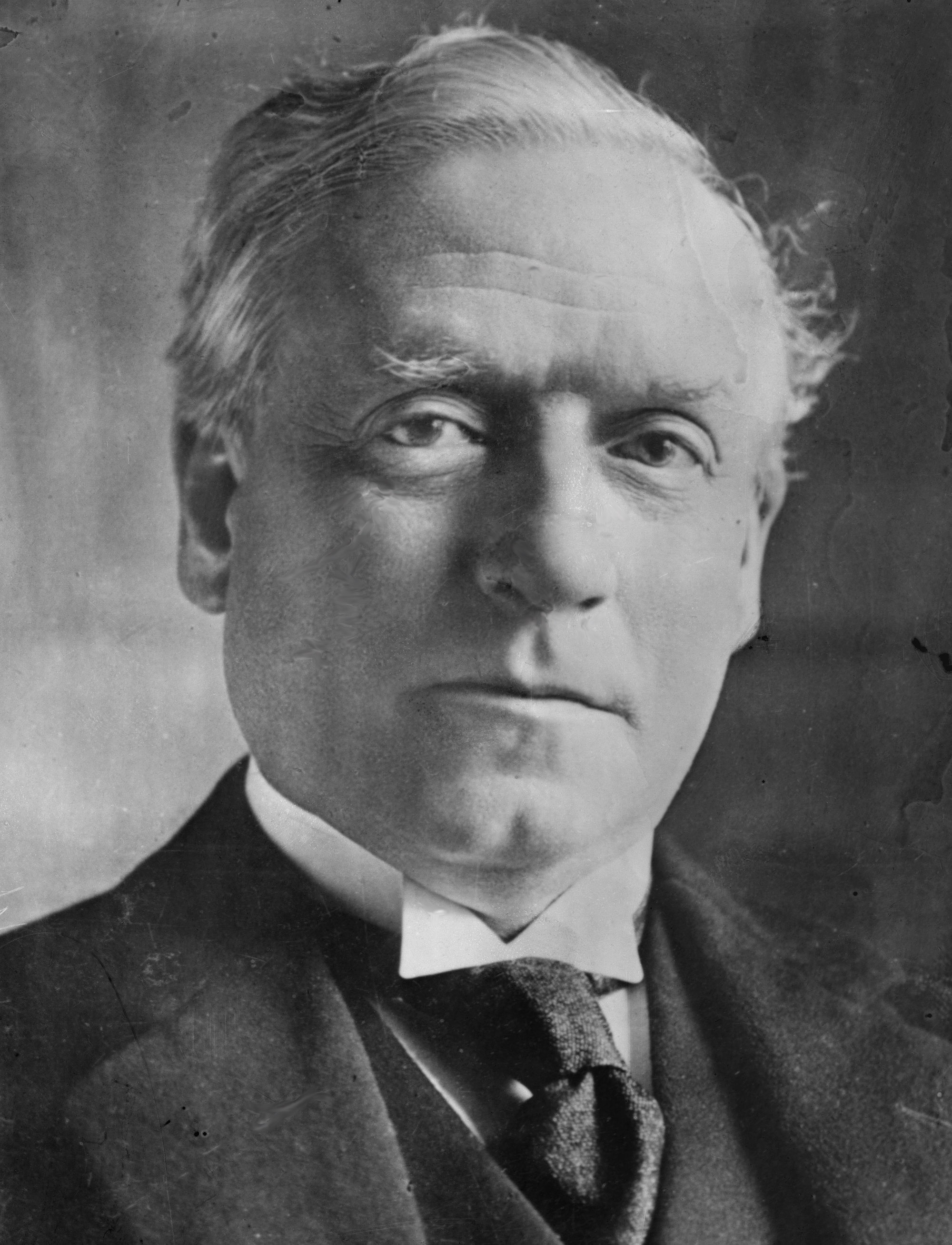
British Prime Minister H.H. Asquith

- As expected, Great Britain's House of Lords voted against approval of the Irish Home Rule bill, for the second time, by a majority of 238. Prime Minister H. H. Asquith announced that his government would present a plan for abolition of the House of Lords at the next session of Parliament. The bill would finally become law on September 18, 1914, after passing under the terms of the Parliament Act on May 25 of that year.
- Stoyan Danev resigned as Prime Minister of Bulgaria.
- Augustus Octavius Bacon was re-elected U.S. senator in the first election under the 17th Amendment but would pass away while serving his term in 1914.
- Born:
  - Lloyd "Cowboy" Copas, American country singer, known for country hits "Signed Sealed and Delivered" and "Candy Kisses"; in Blue Creek, Ohio, United States (killed in plane crash with Patsy Cline, 1963)
  - Abraham Sutzkever, Russian Yiddish poet and Holocaust survivor, known for poetry collections including Lider (Songs) and Lider fun geto (Songs from the ghetto); in Smarhon, Russian Empire (present-day Belarus) (d. 2010)

== July 16, 1913 (Wednesday) ==
- China's President Yuan Shikai asked Prime Minister Zhao Bingjun to resign, then appointed him to the Beijing police to guide a campaign against Yuan's opponents.
- Robert Bridges was appointed by Prime Minister H. H. Asquith as the new Poet Laureate of the United Kingdom, to succeed the late Alfred Austin.
- The Argentina city of Villa Carlos Paz was founded by Carlos Nicandro Paz.
- Born: William L. Brown, American geneticist, known for his research into genetically modified organisms for agriculture; in Arbovale, West Virginia, United States (d. 1991)

== July 17, 1913 (Thursday) ==
- William Lea Chambers was nominated as the first U.S. Commissioner of Mediation and Conciliation.
- The all-female Frensham School was established in Mittagong, New South Wales, Australia.
- Born: Roger Garaudy, French author, philosopher and Holocaust denier, author of The Founding Myths of Modern Israel; in Marseille, France (d. 2012)
- Died: Jassim bin Mohammed Al Thani, 88, Emir of Qatar since 1878 (b. 1825)

== July 18, 1913 (Friday) ==
- A rebellion broke out in the Sichuan province of the Republic of China, with Tsen Chun-hsuan being declared president.
- As troops from Romania advanced to within thirty miles of Sofia, King Ferdinand sent an appeal to King Carol of Romania, asking for a ceasefire and discussion of terms of peace.
- Born:
  - Red Skelton, American comedian and television star known for The Red Skelton Show; as Richard Bernard Eheart, in Vincennes, Indiana, United States (d. 1997)
  - Eric Pohlmann, Austrian-born British actor, known for his character film and stage roles including Gentlemen Marry Brunettes and Lust for Life; as Erich Pollak, in Vienna, Austria-Hungary (present-day Austria) (d. 1979)
  - Karl Rolvaag, American politician, Governor of Minnesota 1963-1967, later Ambassador to Iceland 1967-1969; in Northfield, Minnesota, United States (d. 1990)

== July 19, 1913 (Saturday) ==
- The French Chamber of Deputies voted 358-204 to extend the required military service from two years to three years.
- The Mental Deficiency Act was passed by the British House of Commons, 180 to 3, providing for the removal of "feeble-minded" persons to special institutions. The only three MPs to vote against it were Josiah Wedgwood, Frederick Banbury and Handel Booth. The act would receive royal assent and take effect on April 1, 1914.
- At Guangzhou (Canton), the Governor-General of the Kwangtung province proclaimed that land's independence from China.
- The Apostolic Prefecture of the Island of Formosa was established in Taiwan, later becoming the Roman Catholic Diocese of Kaohsiung in 1961.
- The Villa Marina on the Isle of Man was reopened as a theatrical venue by Lieutenant Governor George Somerset.
- The village of Kincaid, Saskatchewan was established.
- Died: Clímaco Calderón, 60, President of Colombia for a single day in 1882 (b. 1852)

== July 20, 1913 (Sunday) ==
- United States Secretary of State William Jennings Bryan announced the terms of a proposed treaty with Nicaragua that would make the Central American nation a virtual U.S. protectorate relative to international affairs.
- The Fujian (Fukien) province, led by Xu Chongzhi, seceded from the Republic of China.
- Vasil Radoslavov formed a new cabinet as Prime Minister of Bulgaria.
- The New Town Hall, designed by architects Hermann Eggert and Gustav Halmhuber opened to the public in Hanover.

== July 21, 1913 (Monday) ==
- Turkish forces for the Ottoman Empire, led by Enver Pasha, recaptured the city of Adrianople from Bulgaria, four months after the Bulgarians had successfully invaded the historic city on March 26, 1913. The city, which had been ceded to Bulgaria less than two months earlier by the Treaty of London, would formally be relinquished back to the Ottoman Empire by the Treaty of Constantinople on September 29.
- China's President Yuan Shikai declared martial law nationwide as the southern provinces continued their rebellion. On the same day, former President Sun Yat-sen released a statement to the media, calling for Yuan's resignation.
- British suffragette Nellie Hall threw a brick through the window of the automobile of Prime Minister H. H. Asquith, while he was being chauffeured during a visit to Birmingham.
- Born: Catherine Storr, British children's writer, author of Marianne Dreams; as Catherine Cole, in Kensington, England (d. 2001)

== July 22, 1913 (Tuesday) ==
- Fifty people, mostly women and girls, were killed in a fire at the Binghamton Clothing Company factory in Binghamton, New York. Although an alarm system had been installed two months earlier by state law, it was believed that there had been so many fire drills that "recent familiarity with fire drills had led the workers to become almost indifferent to alarms," the girls were slow in evacuating the second and third floors, and were trapped by the swiftly moving fire. Firefighters were also led four blocks off course by a bystander who stood at the corner and rang an alarm.
- The House of Lords rejected the Welsh Disestablishment Bill, voting 242-48 against giving the bill a second reading, after the measure had come from the House of Commons. The Welsh Church Act would pass the following year.
- McGraw Square was dedicated in Denny Triangle, Seattle. The square features a statue of John McGraw, second Governor of Washington.
- Born: Tex Thornton, American entrepreneur, founder of Litton Industries; as Charles Bates Thornton, in Goree, Texas, United States (d. 1981)
- Died: Eduardo López Rivas, 62, Venezuelan journalist, founder of the newspaper Diario El Fonógrafo and the magazine El Zulia ilustrado (b. 1850)

== July 23, 1913 (Wednesday) ==
- Copper miners in Michigan walked off of their jobs in a strike called by the Western Federation of Miners, with the goal of winning an eight-hour workday without a cut in pay. The strike would last for more than eight months, until April 12, 1914, without the miners receiving the shorter day. During that time, 73 people, consisting of striking miners and their families would die in the Italian Hall disaster on December 24, 1913.
- George Washington Hays was elected as the 24th Governor of Arkansas in a special state election with 64% of the vote.
- William F. Cody, better known by his stage name Buffalo Bill, auctioned off the assets of the Buffalo Bill's Wild West show that he had operated since May 19, 1883. The public auction followed Cody's loss of nearly one million dollars in attempts to mine gold in Arizona.
- Born:
  - Michael Foot, British politician, Leader of the Opposition from 1980 to 1983; in Plymouth, Devonshire, England (d. 2010)
  - Licia Albanese, Italian-born American opera singer, known for her collaborations with Metropolitan Opera; in Bari, Kingdom of Italy (present-day Italy) (d. 2014)
  - Coral Browne, Australian actress, known for film roles in An Englishman Abroad, The Killing of Sister George, and The Ruling Class; as Coral Brown, in Melbourne, Australia (d. 1991)

== July 24, 1913 (Thursday) ==
- The House of Lords rejected the bill abolishing plural voting by a margin of 166 to 42.
- The United States Department of Justice filed an antitrust lawsuit for the first time against American Telephone and Telegraph (AT&T) for monopolistic practices in Oregon, Washington, Idaho and Montana. The suit would be dropped after AT&T agreed to divest itself of its ownership of Western Union stock.
- The Museu de Belles Arts de València was established in Valencia, Spain.
- Born: Britton Chance, American biochemist who patented the stopped-flow technique to measure fast biochemical reactions, as well as being an Olympic gold medalist swimmer; in Wilkes-Barre, Pennsylvania, United States (d. 2010)

== July 25, 1913 (Friday) ==
- Austria-Hungary warned Serbia and Greece not to humiliate Bulgaria in a peace settlement.
- The Washington Senators and the St. Louis Browns (now the Minnesota Twins and Baltimore Orioles, respectively) played to an 8-8 tie after their game went 15 innings until ended because of darkness. Walter Johnson set a record for a relief pitcher, throwing 15 strikeouts. Carl Weilman of the Browns became the first player to strike out six times in one game, in every single one of his times at bat. Walter Johnson's record would be broken 88 years later, by Randy Johnson on July 19, 2001.

== July 26, 1913 (Saturday) ==
- The Hunan province seceded from the Republic of China, even as Chinese troops retook the city of Zhenjiang (Chinkiang) in the Jiangsu province.
- Romania halted its armies to within ten miles of the Bulgarian capital of Sofia, at the request of Bulgaria's Foreign Minister and an assurance of a favorable settlement.
- British soldiers, who had been sent to monitor the Ulster Volunteers, fired into a crowd of Irish protesters in Dublin, killing three and wounding 38.
- The Roman Catholic Diocese of Tacámbaro was established in Mexico.
- Born: Kan Yuet-keung, Chinese financial leader, chairman of the Bank of East Asia from 1963 to 1983; in Hong Kong (d. 2012)

== July 27, 1913 (Sunday) ==
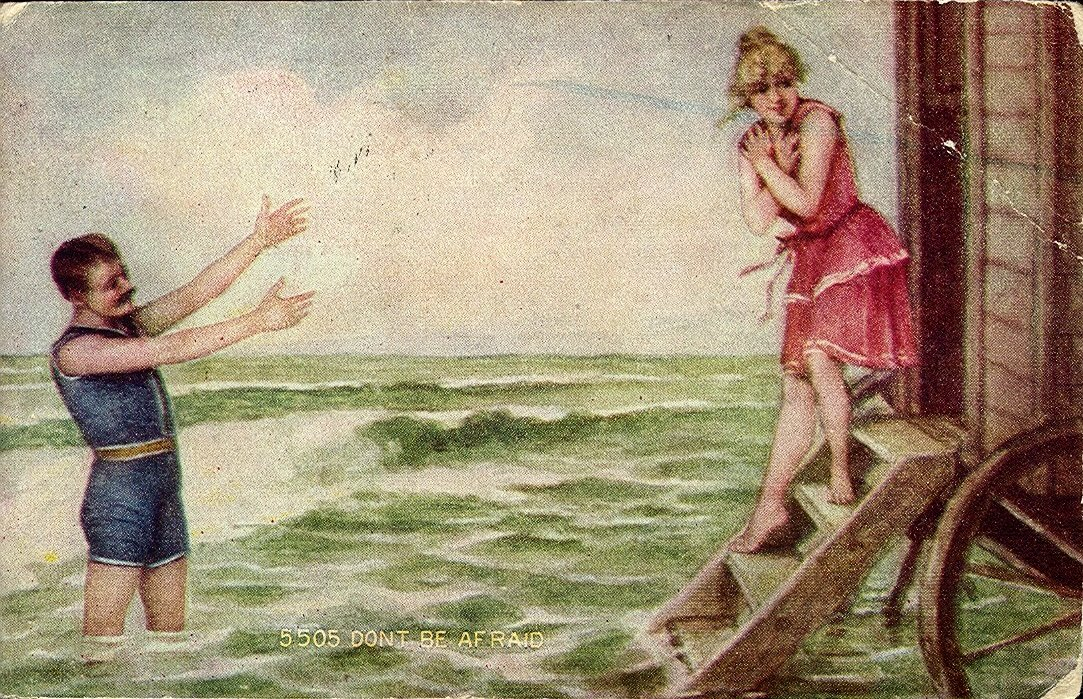
Modest swimming attire in the 1910s

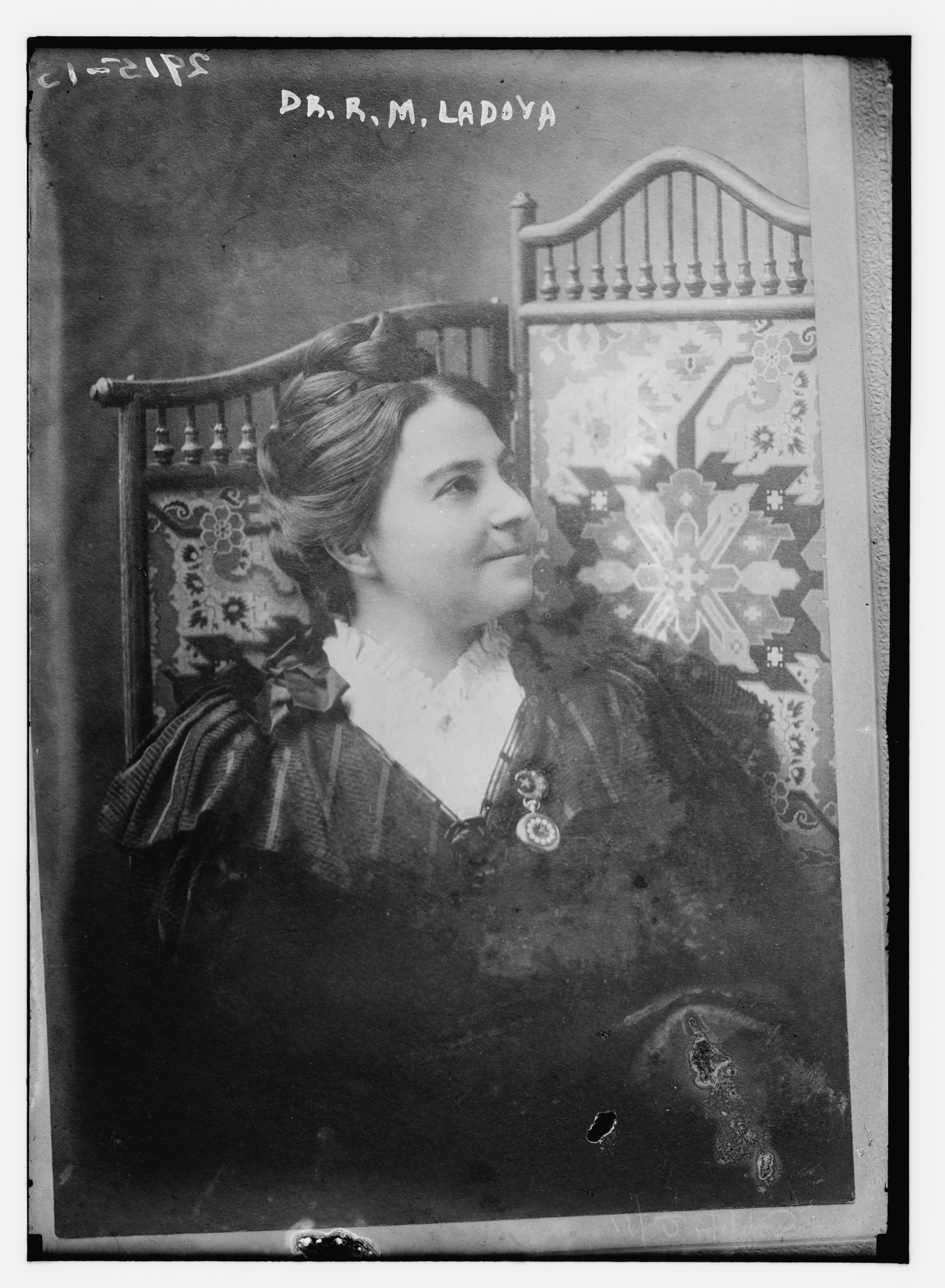
Dr. Rosalie M. Ladova in the 1910s

- In an action that made headlines around the world, Dr. Rosalie M. Ladova, a prominent Chicago physician, made an unsuccessful attempt to challenge the American social mores of the time, when she discarded the "bathing skirt" that female swimmers were required to wear in addition to the bloomers that covered their legs. Police arrested Dr. Ladova at the beach at Jackson Park on Lake Michigan and charged her with obscenity. After seeing the newspaper photographs the next day of Dr. Cordova's blouse and bloomers swimwear, Chicago Mayor Carter Harrison IV declared that "No woman should think of wearing that kind of costume" at a beach, and directed the city police to "gently but firmly insist upon the lady putting on proper costumes." The "skin-tight" bathing suit had long been accepted in Britain for both men and women. After Dr. Ladova's daring experiment, almost eight years would pass before the taboo was discarded in the United States, with Mayor Robert Crissye of the city of Somers Point, New Jersey, inviting women "to bathe on his city's beaches barelegged and in a one-piece suit," in the style of Australian swimmer Annette Kellermann.
- The association football club Chaco For Ever was established in Resistencia, Chaco, Argentina.
- The town of San Javier, Uruguay was established.

== July 28, 1913 (Monday) ==
- Bulgaria and Romania signed a peace treaty in Bucharest, with Bulgaria ceding its territory in Southern Dobruja in return for Romania withdrawing its troops.
- The United States tennis team defeated Great Britain in the finals of the Davis Cup, held at Wimbledon, London.
- The trial of Jewish factory manager Leo Frank, on charges of the murder of Mary Phagan, began in Atlanta. Because of the heat, the windows in the Fulton County courthouse were kept open, giving the opportunity for the mob outside to influence the trial's outcome, although the Supreme Court of the United States would later rule, in 1915, that Frank's due process rights had not been prejudiced by the circumstances.
- Born:
  - Laird Cregar, American actor, known for his film roles in I Wake Up Screaming and The Lodger; as Samuel Laird Cregar, in Philadelphia, United States (d. 1944)
  - Rosemary Murray, British chemist and educator, and the first woman to hold the position of Vice-Chancellor at the University of Cambridge; in Havant, England (d. 2004)

== July 29, 1913 (Tuesday) ==
- At a conference of the ambassadors to London of the six "Great Powers" (Austria-Hungary, France, Germany, Italy, Russia, and the United Kingdom), it was agreed that an international commission would govern Albania until a monarch could be chosen, and boundaries were set for the new nation. The seven-member International Control Commission, composed of one representative each from each of the Great Powers, and Albania, was to govern the country for ten years. In March, Prince Wilhelm zu Wied would be selected as King of Albania under the ICC's authority, but the Commission dissolved after its members went to war against each other.
- The Anglo-Ottoman Convention was signed between the British and Ottoman Empires, as the "Convention relating to the Persian Gulf and surrounding territories". However, the convention was never ratified and became a moot point in 1914 when World War I began.
- Under the stipulations of the Treaty of Bucharest, Bulgaria demobilized its army.
- Slovak clergy and politician Andrej Hlinka established the Hlinka Party, eventually evolving into the Slovak People's Party.
- Sports club Vålerengens was established in Oslo, where it became known for its men's association football, women's association football, and ice hockey programs.
- Born: Erich Priebke, German Schutzstaffel (SS) officer who commanded the Ardeatine massacre of 335 civilians in 1944; in Hennigsdorf, Brandenburg province, Prussia (present-day Germany (d. 2013)
- Died: Tobias Asser, 75, Dutch lawyer, recipient of the 1911 Nobel Peace Prize for helping to establish the Hague Conference on Private International Law (b. 1838)

== July 30, 1913 (Wednesday) ==
- As a bloody battle between Bulgarian and Greek troops took place at Djuma, south of Sofia, representatives of Bulgaria, Serbia, Greece, Romania and Montenegro agreed to an armistice in a meeting at Bucharest.
- Ten spectators at a motorcycle race in Cincinnati were killed and over 100 injured, when racer Odin Johnson lost control of his cycle while competing at the Lagoon Motordrome and crashed into a light pole, showering the stands with flaming gasoline.
- Great Britain announced that it would not participate in the Panama–Pacific International Exposition at San Francisco in 1915, and was followed within the next two days by Germany and Russia, with news editorials saying "it is regarded as Great Britain's way of intimating that she still resents the course of the United States in regard to the [Panama] canal tolls."
- American singer Chauncey Olcott made the first recording of the classic Irish-American song "Too Ra Loo Ra Loo Ral", written by James Royce Shannon, as a way to promote the Tin Pan Alley musical Shameen Dhu.
- Born: Lou Darvas, American cartoonist, best known for his cover art for Sporting News; as Louis Darvas, in Cleveland, United States (d. 1987)

== July 31, 1913 (Thursday) ==
- In the largest demonstration for women's suffrage in the United States up to that time, a motorcade of sixty automobiles traveled from Hyattsville, Maryland to the United States Capitol to present the United States Senate with petitions bearing 200,000 signatures of persons favoring an amendment to the U.S. Constitution to allow women to vote. On May 9, 1915, petitions with 500,000 signatures would be presented, and on October 27, 1917, one million.
- The Second Opium Conference was convened, at The Hague, in order to take up the matter of the remaining 12 of 46 nations that had not signed. The Conference would end after eight days.
- The Royal Meteorological Institute was established in Brussels.
