= August 1913 =

Month of 1913

<<	August 1913					>>
Su	Mo	Tu	We	Th	Fr	Sa
					1	2
3	4	5	6	7	8	9
10	11	12	13	14	15	16
17	18	19	20	21	22	23
24	25	26	27	28	29	30
31

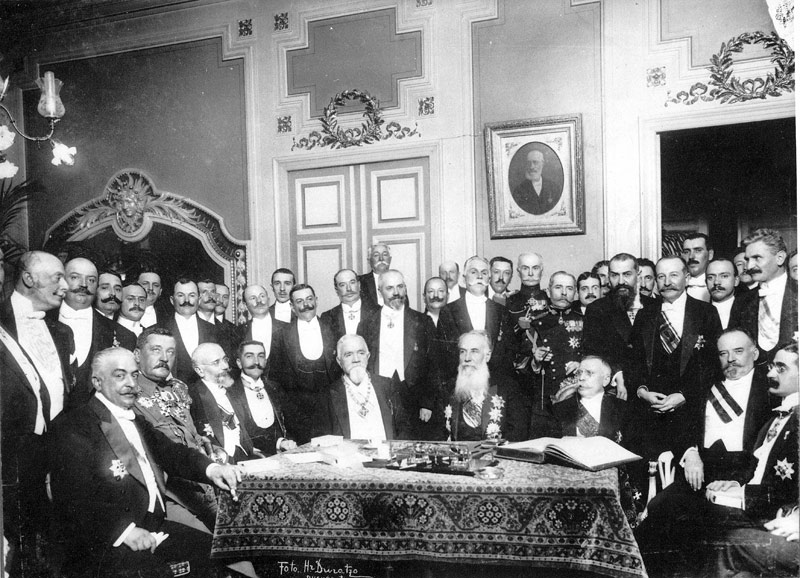
August 10, 1913: Bucharest treaty ends Second Balkan War

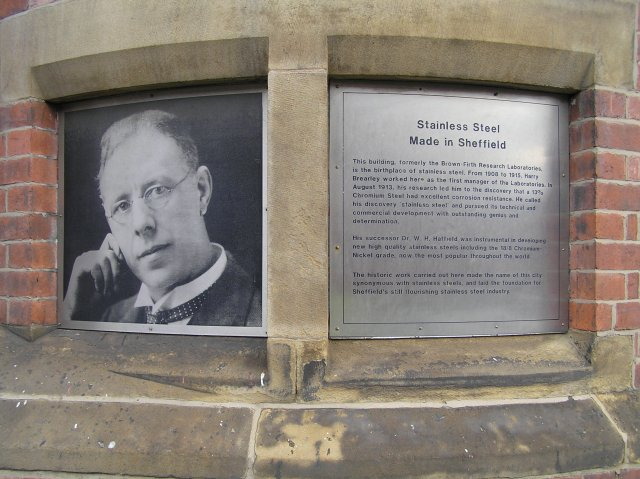
August 20, 1913: Stainless steel invented by British metallurgist Harry Brearley (pictured, the stainless steel plaque honoring him)

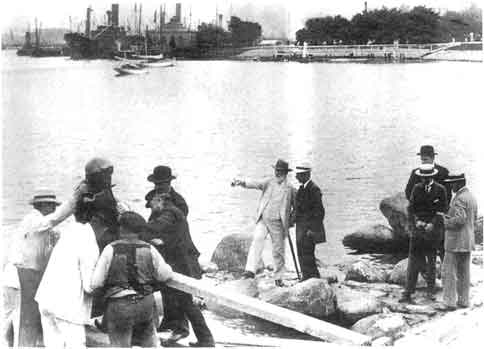
August 23, 1913: The Little Mermaid statue assembled in Copenhagen

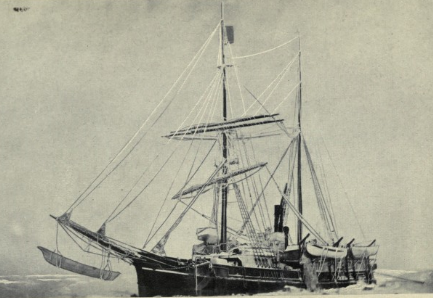
August 13, 1913: Canadian arctic ship Karluk trapped in ice

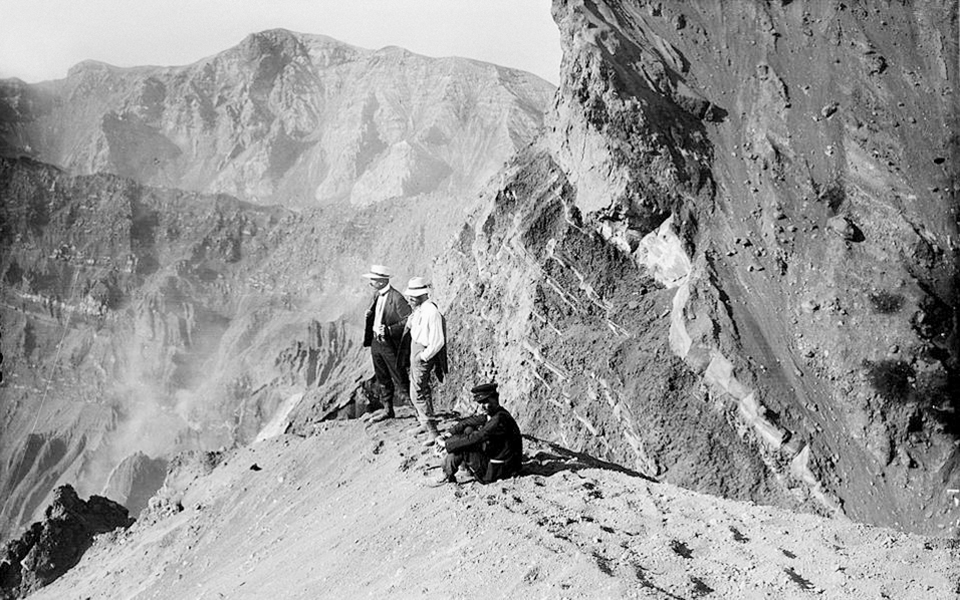
August 2, 1913: Mortal men reach the summit of Mount Olympus, home of the Greek gods

The following events occurred in August 1913:

== August 1, 1913 (Friday) ==
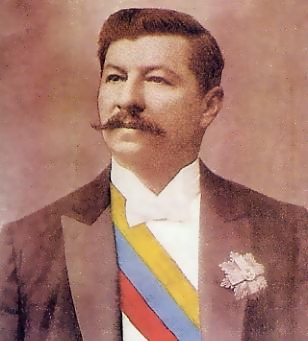
Juan Vicente Gómez, President of Venezuela.

- The federal council of Venezuela authorized President Juan Vicente Gómez to assume dictatorial powers until the revolution led by Cipriano Castro could be suppressed.
- Mexican President Victoriano Huerta announced that he had no intention of resigning.
- Russia announced that it would not participate in the Panama–Pacific International Exposition. In doing so, it joined the United Kingdom, Turkey, Bulgaria, Serbia, Egypt, Morocco and Siam. Another 27 nations had accepted the invitation to participate, including China, France, Japan, the Netherlands, Norway and Sweden, as well as most of the South American and Latin American countries. Austria-Hungary, Germany, Italy and Belgium were among the 15 other invited nations that had not decided on appearing at the Exposition, to open in San Francisco in 1914.
- The British Army dissolved the XIV Brigade of the Royal Horse Artillery.
- The Children's Museum was opened in the Pinebank Mansion, Olmsted Park, Boston. It moved to its present location on the Children's Wharf at Fort Point Channel in 1979.

== August 2, 1913 (Saturday) ==
- The weekly newspaper Courrier d'Ethiopie began publication in Addis Ababa, Ethiopia, the first foreign language newspaper in the country.
- Swiss mountaineers Daniel Baud-Bovy and Frédéric Boissonnas, guided by Christos Kakkalos, made the first known ascent of Mount Olympus in Greece.
- The Social Democratic Party of Finland won the most seats in parliamentary elections in the Grand Duchy of Finland. However, the Russian Empire would suspend the Finnish parliament the following year at the start of World War I.
- Association football club Otterup was established in Otterup, Funen, Denmark.
- Pieter Cort van der Linden became the new Prime Minister of the Netherlands.
- French aviator Eugène Gilbert became the first person to fly 1,000 miles (1,600 km) in a single day to win the semi-annually awarded Pommery Cup. The prize was to be given to the person who "makes the longest flight across country from sunrise to sunset on one day, during which he may stop as often as he wishes to replenish fuel." Gilbert departed Paris at 4:45 am, flew seven hours non-stop to the Spanish town of Vittoria, departed again at 1:00 and arrived at the Portuguese town of Pejabo at 8:00 pm.
- The United States Senate Foreign Relations Committee voted 8–4 to reject United States Secretary of State William Jennings Bryan's proposal to sign a treaty to make Nicaragua a protectorate of the United States. Bryan dropped further discussion of the treaty for the rest of the year.
- Explosions at the East Brookside Colliery of the Philadelphia and Reading Coal and Iron Company mine at Tower City, Pennsylvania, killed 19 people and seriously injured 20. Thirteen men were killed in the blast, and five men who volunteered to be rescuers were killed in a second explosion in the 1,800-foot (550 m) deep mine shaft.
- Born: Hal Block, American comedian, known for his collaborations with Bob Hope, Abbott and Costello, Martin and Lewis, Milton Berle and Burns and Allen, noted panelist on the 1950s television game show What's My Line?; as Harold Leonard Block, in Chicago, United States (d. 1981)

== August 3, 1913 (Sunday) ==
- The "Wheatland hop riot" began after farm workers at the hops farm at Durst Ranch, near the town of Wheatland, in Yuba County, California, gathered for a meeting with Richard "Blackie" Ford, an organizer for the Industrial Workers of the World union. When the Yuba County Sheriff and his officers arrived to arrest Ford, a crowd of workers rushed the officers. Four people were killed in the melee.
- Died:
  - William Lyne, 69, Australian politician, 13th Premier of New South Wales 1899 to 1901 (b. 1844)
  - Josephine Cochrane, 74, American entrepreneur, inventor (in 1886) of the first commercial automatic dishwasher (b. 1839)

== August 4, 1913 (Monday) ==
- U.S. President Woodrow Wilson asked Henry Lane Wilson to resign as U.S. Ambassador to Mexico, and sent former Minnesota Governor John Lind as his personal representative to attempt a settlement of the Mexican Revolution. However, President Victoriano Huerta said two days later that Lind would not be allowed to enter the country unless he brought an official recognition of the Huerta government. Lind arrived in Mexico City on August 11.
- As the uprising of China's southern provinces collapsed, the Fujian province rescinded its July 20 declaration of independence, and rebel general Xu Chongzhi fled to Japan, returning control of the province to Governor Sun Daoren.
- Joseph Knowles, a 44-year-old survivalist, began his experiment of living alone in "the uncharted forests of northeastern Maine," pledging to live "as Adam lived" for two months. Before a group of reporters, Knowles removed all of his clothes, and walked into the forest without clothing, food or tools. The American press followed his progress using written notes Knowles left at prearranged locations. Knowles would emerge from the forest on October 4, 1913, wearing a bearskin robe, deerskin moccasins, and a knife, bow and arrows that he had crafted himself. However, there were rumors that Knowles' story was a hoax.
- The sports club Arromba was established in Americana, São Paulo, Brazil. It was renamed Rio Branco in 1961.
- In fiction, August 4, 1913, marks the climax of the novel The Good Soldier, by Ford Madox Ford.
- Born: Robert Hayden, American poet; 24th Consultant in Poetry to the Library of Congress (1976–1978) and the first African American to hold that position; as Asa Bundy Sheffey, in Detroit, United States (d. 1980)

== August 5, 1913 (Tuesday) ==
- Pope Pius X reformed longstanding rules of canon law that had restricted the hearing of confession for members of certain religious orders. Previously, confessions could not be heard without prior approval by a superior.
- The sports club Cañadense was established in Cañada de Gómez, Argentina. It is now known for its association football and basketball programs.

== August 6, 1913 (Wednesday) ==
- John Henry Mears set a new record for traveling around the world, arriving back in New York City after 35 days, 21 hours and 35 minutes. Sponsored by the New York Evening Sun, Mears broke Andre Jaeger-Schmidt's record, set in 1911, by four days. Mears, who had departed the newspaper's offices in the early morning hours of July 2 returned to the same spot "at 10:10 o'clock" in the evening five weeks later.
- Venezuela's President Juan Vicente Gómez temporarily left office in order to personally lead the nation's army against the rebels of Cipriano Castro. José Gil Fortoul of the Federal Council was designated by Gomez to act as President during Gomez's absence.
- Sun Yat-sen, the first President of the Republic of China, fled to the island of Taiwan, which at that time was the Japanese colony of Formosa, after being threatened by President Yuan Shikai.
- The Peruvian towns of Caravelí and Quicacha were destroyed by an earthquake that struck the Arequipa Province.
- U.S. Navy destroyer Cummings was launched by Bath Iron Works in Bath, Maine, and would serve in World War I before it was transferred to the United States Coast Guard. It was decommissioned in 1932.
- Association football club Jugoslavija was established in Belgrade.

== August 7, 1913 (Thursday) ==
- The Senate of France voted 245–37 to pass the Three Years Act, extending compulsory military service from two years to three years.
- El Salvador and the United States signed a five-year treaty, pledging to submit all disputes between them "for investigation and report to an International Commission" composed of representatives from five nations. The proposed Commission would have one year to render its report, during which participating nations would withhold from going to war. The agreement was the first of the international peace treaties that Secretary Bryan had proposed in a "plan for world-wide peace.
- Wild west showman and pioneer aviator Samuel Franklin Cody was killed along with English cricketer William Evans when an experimental Cody Floatplane crashed during a test flight near Mytchett, England.
- The Wiri railway station opened to serve the Southern Line of Auckland. It closed in 2005.

== August 8, 1913 (Friday) ==
- Venustiano Carranza, leader of Mexico's rebellion against the government of President Victoriano Huerta, and Governor of the State of Coahuila, sent a reply to U.S. President Woodrow Wilson's proposal for a ceasefire until elections could be held in October. Carranza said that he did not recognize President Huerta's authority as legal and that his "comrades in arms in the just defense of our constitutional rights" would continue to fight.
- The new Bloomfield Public Library, funded by the Carnegie Foundation, opened in Bloomfield, Iowa. The building was added to the National Register of Historic Places in 2015.
- Born: Robert Stafford, American politician, Governor of Vermont 1959 to 1961, later U.S. Representative (1961–1971) and U.S. Senator (1971–1989); in Rutland, Vermont (d. 2006)

== August 9, 1913 (Saturday) ==
- Slightly less than one year before the outbreak of World War I, a diplomat from Austria-Hungary told representatives from Italy and Germany that his Empire intended to plan an invasion of Serbia. The private discussion would be revealed on December 5, 1914, by Italian Prime Minister Giovanni Giolitti, who said that Italy refused to participate.
- Born: Herman Talmadge, American politician, Governor of Georgia 1947, 1948–1955, later U.S. Senator (1957–1981); in McRae, Georgia, United States (d. 2002)

== August 10, 1913 (Sunday) ==
- The Treaty of Bucharest was signed at 10:30 a.m., ending the Second Balkan War. Serbia and Greece agreed to withdraw their troops from Bulgaria within three days, and Romania agreed to withdraw from Bulgaria within 15 days. In return, Bulgaria, which had won control of most of the region of Macedonia from Turkey in the First Balkan War, gave up 90% of its gains. Serbia increased its size by 80% with the acquisition of northern Macedonia, and Greece increased in size by 68% with the southern half of Macedonia. Bulgaria also ceded Southern Dobruja to Romania, and agreed to demobilize its armed forces immediately. The parties also agreed to submit any future disputes over their borders for arbitration by Belgium, the Netherlands or Switzerland.
- Born:
  - Wolfgang Paul, German physicist, recipient of the 1989 Nobel Prize in Physics for developing the ion trap used to capture electrons for study; in Lorenzkirch, German Empire (present-day Zeithain, Germany) (d. 1993)
  - Noah Beery Jr., American actor, best known for his supporting role in the television crime series The Rockford Files; in New York City, United States (d. 1994)

== August 11, 1913 (Monday) ==
- The London ambassadors conference of Europe's six "Great Powers" (Austria-Hungary, France, Germany, Italy, Russia, the United Kingdom) settled on the boundaries of the new Principality of Albania, created from former Turkish territory by the Balkan League during the First Balkan War. Greece received most of the Chameria, the southern part of the region occupied by the Albanian people, which was incorporated into Epirus, with the capital, Yanina, being renamed as Ioannina. British Foreign Secretary Edward Grey told Parliament the next day that the division of the Albanian people had been made to avoid a war between the Great Powers over the region.
- Twelve workers on the Panama Canal, all but one of them Panamanian, were killed in a sudden rockslide at the quarry at Puerto Bello.
- The association football club Bonsucesso was established in Rio de Janeiro, Brazil.
- Born:
  - Angus Wilson, British novelist, author of The Middle Age of Mrs Eliot; as Angus Johnstone-Wilson, in Bexhill-on-Sea, England (d. 1991)
  - H. Clay Earles, American entrepreneur, founder of Martinsville Speedway; as Henry Clay Earles, in Axton, Virginia, United States (d. 1999)

== August 12, 1913 (Tuesday) ==
- The brand name "Oreo" was registered by the United States Patent and Trademark Office for exclusive use by the National Biscuit Company for its cookies, first marketed on March 6, 1912. Theories of the origin of the name include that it was from the Greek word oros (όρος) (for "mountain"), or the French word or (for "gold"), or the Greek word oraia (ωραία), meaning "nice".

== August 13, 1913 (Wednesday) ==
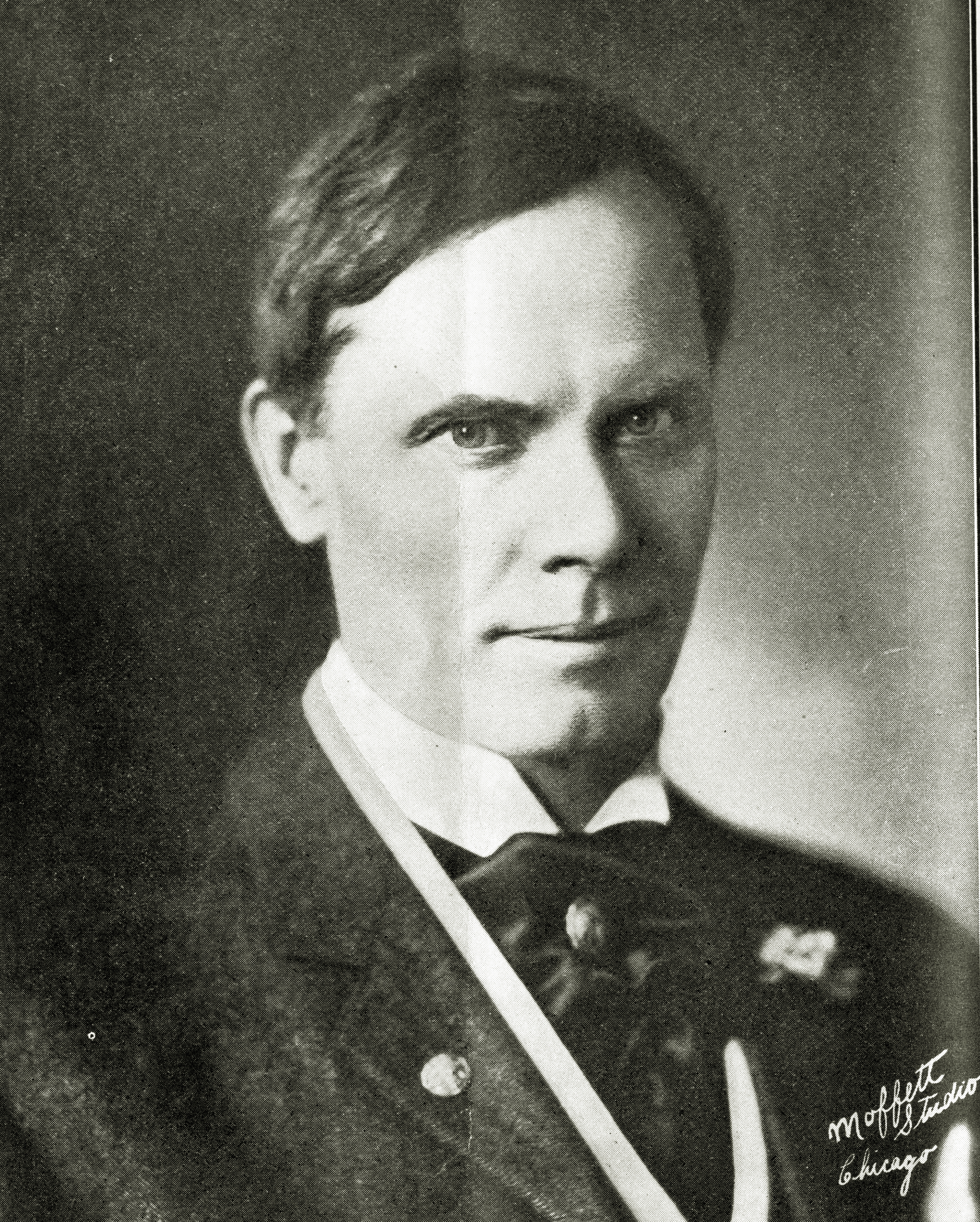
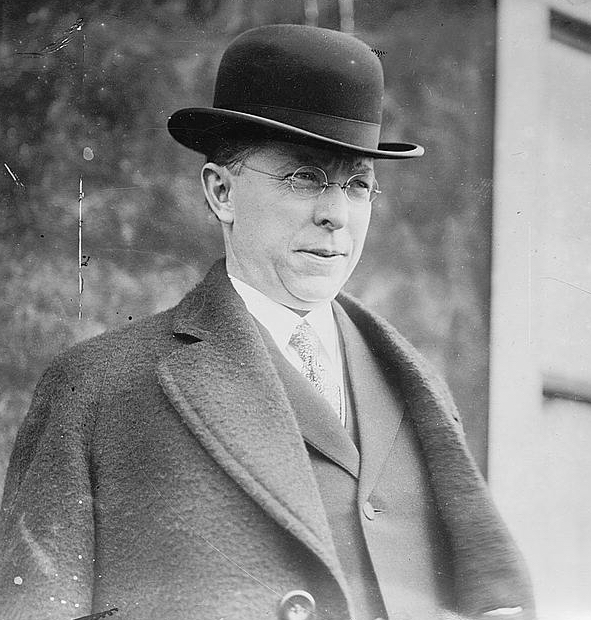
Impeached Governor William Sulzer and Acting Governor Martin H. Glynn
- Chinese government troops and secessionist rebels fought a battle at Guangzhou (Canton), with 1,200 people being killed.
- After an all-night session, the New York State Assembly voted 79–45 to impeach Governor William Sulzer. The eight articles included accusations of larceny, bribery, obstruction of justice, abuse of the public trust, and perjury. Lieutenant Governor Martin H. Glynn became the Acting Governor under state law, as confirmed by the state Attorney General on August 18, although Sulzer said that he would not abandon his office while awaiting his trial in the State Senate on September 18. Sulzer would be found guilty, by a vote of 43–12, on three of the charges, and have removed from office on October 17.
- HMCS Karluk, the flagship for the Canadian Arctic Expedition led by Vilhjalmur Stefansson, became trapped in ice in the Arctic Ocean. The Karluk would drift with the icepack and eventually be crushed by it on January 11; eleven men on the expedition would not survive the search for land.
- The census results for Italy showed a population of 34,671,377 people.
- Born:
  - Makarios III, Cypriot clergy and state leader, Archbishop and first President of Cyprus; as Michail Christodolou Mouskos, in Pano Panagia, British Cyprus (present-day Cyprus) (d. 1977)
  - Fred Davis, English snooker and billiards player; three-time winner of the World Snooker Championship and the World Billiards Championship; in Chesterfield, England (d. 1998)
- Died:
  - August Bebel, German politician, 73, founder of the Social Democratic Party and its Chairman since 1892 (b. 1840)
  - U. M. Rose, 79, American lawyer and judge, founding member of the American Bar Association (b. 1834)

== August 14, 1913 (Thursday) ==
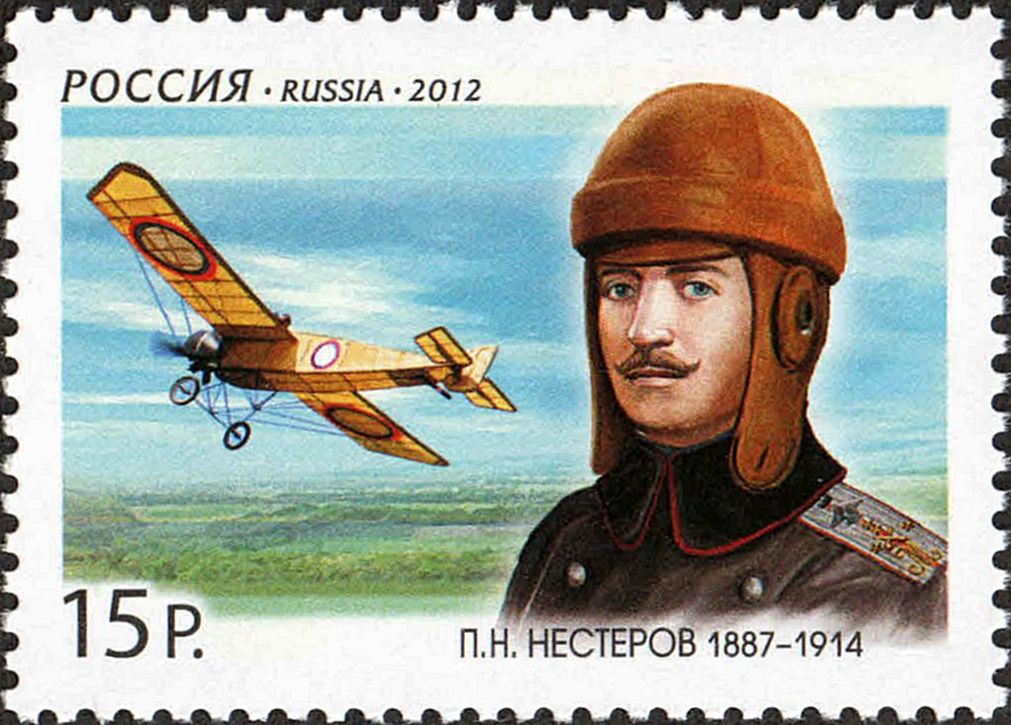
Russian stamp of aviator Pyotr Nesterov

- In the skies near Kiev, Russian aviator Pyotr Nesterov became the first person to execute a loop, flying his Nieuport airplane on an upward pitch until he was upside down, then bringing it back down.

== August 15, 1913 (Friday) ==
- Albert Schweitzer performed major surgery for the first time at the site of what would become Hôpital Albert Schweitzer at Lambaréné in Gabon, at that time a part of French Equatorial Africa in the jungle. The mission hospital was still under construction, but the patient had a strangulated hernia that required immediate attention. With his wife as the anesthetist, Dr. Schweitzer did the operation in the students' housing at the nearby mission school.
- The 10th Queen's Own Canadian Hussars of the Non-Permanent Active Militia was disbanded in Quebec City. It would be mobilized again in 1928.

== August 16, 1913 (Saturday) ==
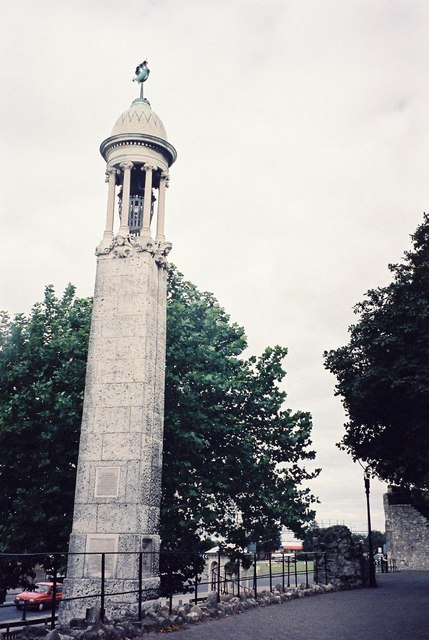
Pilgrim monument in Southampton, England

- The English city of Southampton dedicated a monument to the America-bound Pilgrims who had sailed from there on the Mayflower on July 15, 1620.
- Germany became the third major nation to boycott the Panama–Pacific International Exposition.
- The play Potash and Perlmutter by Montague Glass and Charles Klein premiered at George M. Cohan's Theatre in New York City and ran for 441 performances. It debuted the following year in London.
- Born:
  - Menachem Begin, Russian-born Israeli state leader who served as Prime Minister of Israel from 1977 to 1983; co-recipient, with Anwar Sadat, of the 1979 Nobel Peace Prize for signing the Egypt–Israel peace treaty in 1979; in Brest, Russian Empire (present-day Belarus) (d. 1992)
  - Ernest "Tiny" Bonham, American baseball pitcher, pitcher for the New York Yankees and Pittsburgh Pirates from 1940 until his sudden death from surgical complications 19 days after his last game; in Ione, California, United States (d. 1949)

== August 17, 1913 (Sunday) ==
- Emperor Franz Joseph I of Austria appointed his nephew, Archduke Franz Ferdinand of Austria, heir to the throne of Austria-Hungary, as Inspector General of that nation's armed forces. Bosnian Serb Gavrilo Princip would assassinate Franz Ferdinand less than a year later, leading to the outbreak of World War I.
- Harry Kendall Thaw, the millionaire who murdered architect Stanford White on June 25, 1906, and then was confined to an asylum rather than imprisoned, walked out of the mental hospital at Matteawan, New York and fled to Canada. Thaw would be recaptured, sent back to the hospital and finally be released in 1924, and would die in Florida on February 22, 1947.
- Massachusetts angler Charles Church caught a 5-foot (1.5 m) long, 73-pound (33 kg) striped bass, the largest up to that time. Church's record would stand for almost 58 years as the mark that "remained the goal of every striper fisherman," until July 17, 1981, when Captain Bob Roschetta would reel in a 76-pound (34 kg) bass.
- The U.S. passenger ship State of California struck an uncharted reef off Admiralty Island in Alaska and sank within three minutes, with 40 of the 179 passengers and crew drowning. The Pacific Coast Steamship Company vessel had been on its way from Seattle to Skagway.
- Born:
  - Mark Felt, American law enforcer, Associate Director of the Federal Bureau of Investigation from 1972 and 1973, identified in 2005 as the secret source for Watergate information whom reporters Bob Woodward and Carl Bernstein referred to as "Deep Throat"; as William Mark Felt, in Twin Falls, Idaho (d. 2008)
  - Rudy York, American baseball player, catcher and first baseman for the Detroit Tigers, Boston Red Sox, Chicago White Sox, and Philadelphia Athletics between 1934 and 1948; as Preston Rudolph York, in Ragland, Alabama (d. 1970)

== August 18, 1913 (Monday) ==
- Venezuelan government troops recaptured the town of Coro, Venezuela, located in the state of Falcón, from the rebels led by Cipriano Castro. Two of the rebel leaders, General Lazaro Gonzales and General Urbina, were killed in the battle, while Castro was able to flee.
- At the roulette wheel at Le Grande Casino in Monte Carlo, Monaco, the color black came up 26 consecutive times. The probability of the occurrence was 1 in 136,823,184. The incident is cited as an illustration of the gambler's fallacy, because after the wheel stopped at black ten straight times, casino patrons began betting large sums of money on red, on the logic that black could not possibly come up again. The odds of red or black coming up on any individual spin were the same each time—18 out of 37; to no surprise of statisticians, "the casino made several million francs that night."

== August 19, 1913 (Tuesday) ==
- The Turkish council of ministers voted to drop claims to territory west of the Maritza River in return for keeping Adrianople.
- The derailing of a train carrying dynamite caused an explosion killing almost 100 people in the Mexico City suburb of Tacubaya.
- After his airplane failed at an altitude of 900 feet (270 m), aviator Adolphe Pégoud became the first person to bail out from a falling airplane and to land safely.
- Born:
  - John Argyris, Greek-born German computer engineer and developer of the finite element method (FEM); as Johann Hadji Argyris, in Volos, Greece (d. 2004)
  - Richard Simmons, American actor, known for his title role in 1950s television series Sergeant Preston of the Yukon; in Saint Paul, Minnesota (d. 2003)

== August 20, 1913 (Wednesday) ==
- Mario Piacenza became the first person to climb Mount Numakum, a 22,000-foot (6,700 m) high Himalayan peak.

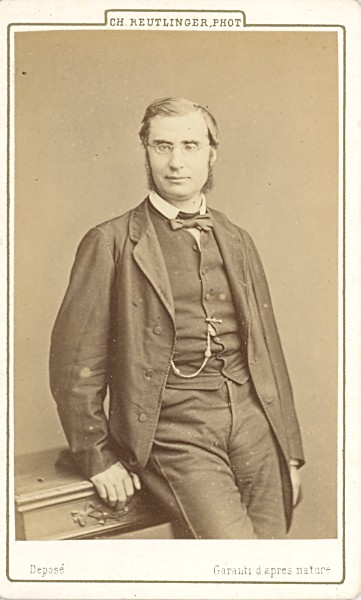
French statesman Émile Ollivier

- French state leader Émile Ollivier, who served as the 24th Prime Minister of France, died in Saint-Gervais-les-Bains in southeast France. Some obituaries were not kind, with The New York Times accusing him of "diplomacy... of the wildest and most unreasonable kind" with German Prussia. He was forced to resign after the outbreak of the Franco-Prussian War, which saw the unification of Germany and the fall of Paris to German troops.
- The combination of materials that would become known as "stainless steel" was cast for the first time, by British metallurgist Harry Brearley. On test number 1008, at a laboratory in Sheffield, Brearley created an alloy that consisted of 12.8% chromium, 0.44% manganese, 0.2% silicon, 0.24% carbon and 85.32% iron. Brearley would later recount that "When microscopic studies of this steel were being made, one of the first noticeable things was that the usual reagent used for etching the polished surface of a microsection would not etch, or etched very slowly... The significance of this is that etching is a form of corrosion, and the specimens behaved in vinegar and other food acids as they behaved with the etching reagents."
- Born: Roger Wolcott Sperry, American medical researcher, recipient of the 1981 Nobel Prize in Physiology or Medicine for his work in split-brain research; in Hartford, Connecticut, United States (d. 1994)

== August 21, 1913 (Thursday) ==
- The San Miguel Corporation, one of the largest food and beverage conglomerates in Southeast Asia, was incorporated in the Philippines.
- The San Mamés Stadium opened in Bilbao, Spain as the home ground for the Athletic Bilbao. It was replaced with a new stadium in 2013.
- The Handley Library opened in Winchester, Virginia. It was added to the National Register of Historic Places in 1969.
- Born:
  - John Henry Faulk, American radio broadcaster, known for his popular radio program The John Henry Faulk Show until it was cancelled following accusations of being a communist by Red Channels, later winning a $3.5 million lawsuit against the group; in Austin, Texas, United States (d. 1990)
  - Robert Krasker, Australian cinematographer, known for his work on films such as Brief Encounter and El Cid, recipient of the Academy Award for Best Cinematography for The Third Man; in Alexandria, Egypt (d. 1981)

== August 22, 1913 (Friday) ==
- Fifty men employed at a gold mine in the Mysore State of India were killed as they were being lowered into the mine shaft. The cable that held their elevator cage broke, sending them plummeting to the bottom.
- As it neared completion, Wolf House, built by author Jack London, was destroyed by a fire before he could move in. "Carefully designed to avert natural disasters and last a thousand years," an author would write later, "it lasted two days." In 1995, a forensic team would conclude that the fire was accidental, caused by the summer heat and the resulting combustion of an oil-soaked rag left behind by a workman.
- The German film The Student of Prague, directed, produced and starring Paul Wegener, went into wide release. The film was roughly based on the short story "William Wilson" by Edgar Allan Poe and is considered an early form of German Expressionism.
- Born:
  - Ahmad Tajuddin, Sultan of Brunei from 1924 to 1950; as Ahmad Tajuddin Akhazul Khairi Waddien, in Bandar Seri Begawan, Brunei (d. 1950)
  - Bruno Pontecorvo, Italian nuclear physicist who defected in 1950 to the Soviet Union, where be continued to research particle physics; in Marina di Pisa, Kingdom of Italy (present-day Italy) (d. 1993)
- Died: Oscar de Négrier, French army officer, commander of the Tonkin Expeditionary Corps during the Tonkin campaign (b. 1839)

== August 23, 1913 (Saturday) ==
- The famous statue The Little Mermaid (Den lille havrue), sculpted by Edvard Eriksen, was unveiled in Copenhagen at the Langelinie pier, commemorating the fairy tale written by Hans Christian Andersen.
- The Great Northern Telegraph Company signed an agreement with the Empire of Japan, expanding its network of cable communications into Asia.
- Russian composer Sergei Prokofiev first performed his composition Piano Concerto No. 2 as a solo piano performance at Pavlovsk, Saint Petersburg, but the Russian Revolution in 1917 prevented him from performing the full orchestral version until 1924 in Paris.
- Born: Bob Crosby, American jazz musician, known for his collaborations with The Andrews Sisters, Doris Day and Jack Benny, younger brother to Bing Crosby; as George Robert Crosby, in Spokane, Washington, United States (d. 1993)

== August 24, 1913 (Sunday) ==
- The Estonia Theatre opened in Tallinn, the largest building in the city at that time.
- The association football club Gloria Arad was founded in Arad, Romania (then part of Austria-Hungary).
- The Italian film The Last Days of Pompeii, directed by Mario Caserini and Eleuterio Rodolfi and based on the novel by Edward Bulwer-Lytton, became the first major film to depict the ancient Roman disaster.
- English poet Herbert Warren, inspired by Mohandas Gandhi to convert to the Indian religion of Jainism, founded the "Mahavira Brotherhood" in London in hopes of spreading the religion in the United Kingdom and the rest of the western world.
- The association football club Rubio Ñu was established in Asunción, Paraguay.
- The city of San Gabriel, California, was incorporated, 142 years after the founding of the Mission San Gabriel Arcángel in 1771, with a population of 1,500 people. One century later, it would have over 40,000 residents.
- Born:
  - Dorothy Comingore, American actress, best known for her roles in Citizen Kane and The Big Night; as Mary Louise Comingore, in Los Angeles, United States (d. 1971)
  - Charles Snead Houston, American physician and mountaineer, noted for attempting twice to climb K2; in New York City, United States (d. 2009)
  - Lan Jen Chu, Chinese-born American engineer, leading researcher of microwave technology, in Huai'an, Jiangsu, Republic of China (present-day China) (d. 1973)

== August 25, 1913 (Monday) ==
- The Roman Catholic Diocese of Araçuaí was established in Araçuaí, Brazil.
- Leo Frank, the Jewish superintendent of a pencil factory in Atlanta, Georgia, was convicted by a jury of the April 26 murder of Mary Phagan, and sentenced to death.
- Born:
  - Don DeFore, American actor, known for his supporting roles in the television sitcoms The Adventures of Ozzie and Harriet and Hazel; as Donald John DeFore, in Cedar Rapids, Iowa, United States (d. 1993)
  - Eugene V. Rostow, U.S. presidential adviser on foreign affairs to Lyndon B. Johnson and Ronald Reagan; in New York City, United States (d. 2002)

== August 26, 1913 (Tuesday) ==
- In Ireland, members of James Larkin's Irish Transport and General Workers' Union employed by the Dublin United Tramways Company began a strike in defiance of the dismissal of trade union members by its chairman.
- The U.S. peace mission to Mexico ended, when American diplomat John Lind left Mexico City.
- The Wells Theatre opened in Norfolk, Virginia. It was listed on the National Register of Historic Places in 1980.
- Born: Boris Pahor, Slovene writer, author of Necropolis, in Imperial Free City of Trieste, Austria-Hungary (present-day Trieste, Italy) (d. 2022)
- Died: Edward L. Baker Jr., American soldier, recipient of the Medal of Honor for heroism during the Spanish–American War (b. 1865)

== August 27, 1913 (Wednesday) ==
- Tobacco company Sampoerna began operating in Surabaya, East Java, Dutch East Indies.

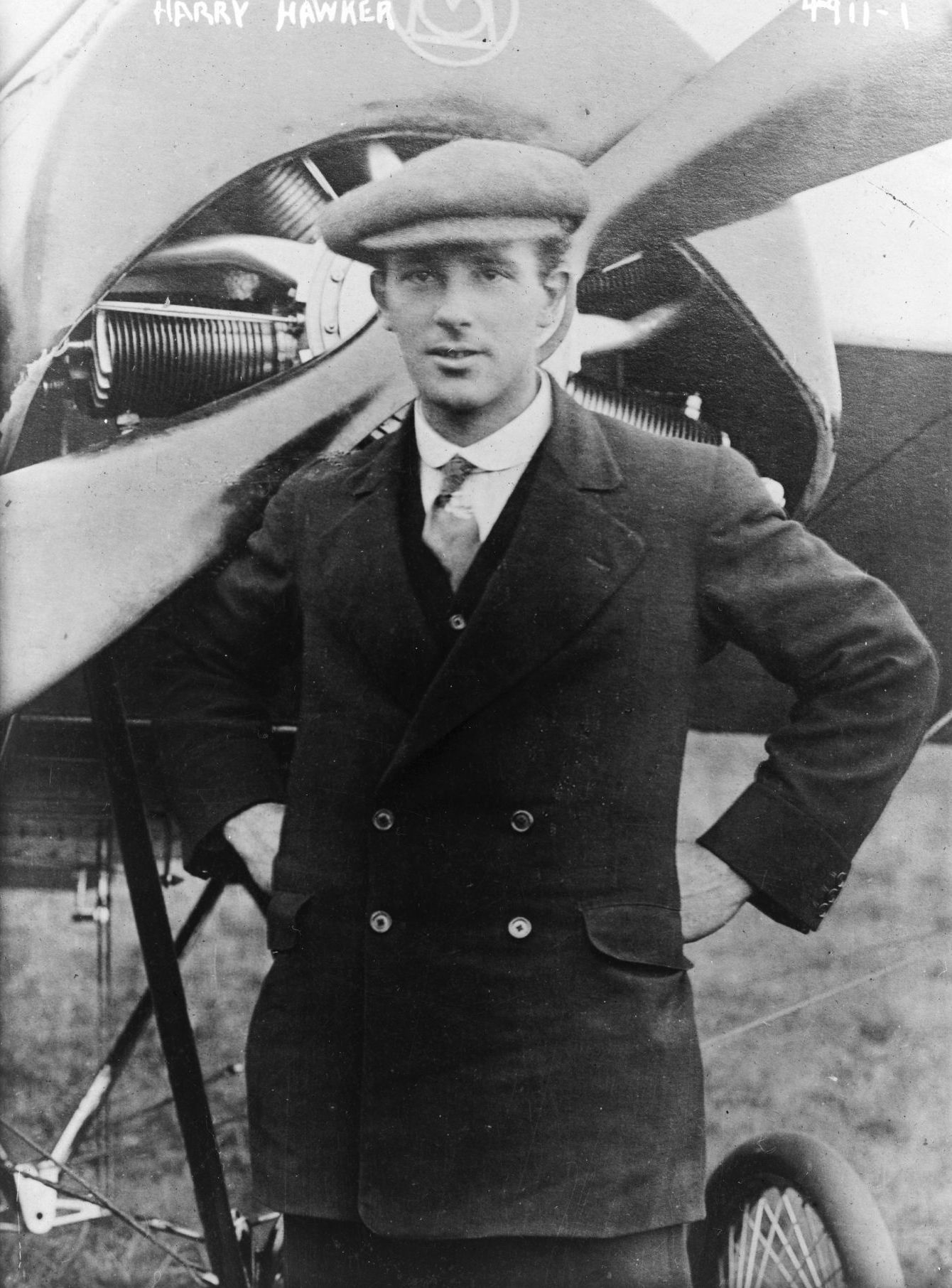
Pilot Harry Hawker.

- British aviator Harry Hawker was two-thirds of the way done with his quest to become the first person to fly an airplane around the British Isles, and slightly less than 500 miles (800 km) from winning a £10,000 prize ($25,000 in 1913 USD, worth roughly $580,000 or £375,000 a century later), when his plane crashed in an accident blamed on his footwear. Hawker escaped serious injury, but "His boots were rubber-soled, and at a critical moment his foot slipped off the rudder bar" of his seaplane, which went out of control and crashed into the Irish Sea, a few feet from the Irish coast at Loughshinny. Hawker escaped with only a broken arm. The sponsor of the prize, the British newspaper the Daily Mail, presented Hawker with a smaller £1,000 prize "in recognition of his skill and courage". The rubber-soled boots, which cost Hawker the equivalent of half a million dollars, were ruined by the seawater.
- U.S. President Woodrow Wilson delivered a written message to Congress, proclaiming American neutrality in Mexico's civil war, and urged all Americans to leave that nation. Wilson stated that he would "see to it that neither side to the struggle now going on in Mexico receive any assistance from this side of the border" and that the U.S. could not "be the partisans of either party" nor "the virtual umpire between them."
- A meteor crashed into the Sakonnet River, near Tiverton, Rhode Island. The explosion, which news reports said "sounded like the discharge of a twelve-inch gun," was heard within a 20-mile (32 km) radius and broke windows in nearby homes.
- Born: Nina Schenk Gräfin von Stauffenberg, Russian-German matriarch, wife of Claus von Stauffenberg, who was imprisoned after her husband attempted to assassinate Adolf Hitler in 1944; in Kowno, Russian Empire (present-dayKaunas), Lithuania (d. 2006)

== August 28, 1913 (Thursday) ==
- Queen Wilhelmina of the Netherlands dedicated the Peace Palace at The Hague, which would later house the International Court of Justice.
- The New York Yacht Club accepted the fourth challenge by Britain's Tho۹mas Lipton in the America's Cup.
- The musical Adele by Adolf Philipp premiered at the Longacre Theatre in New York City.
- The novel The Little Nugget by P. G. Wodehouse was published in hardcover form by Methuen Publishing after being introduced as a serial in Munsey's Magazine through August.
- Born:
  - Jack Dreyfus, American financier, creator of the Dreyfus Funds; as John J. Dreyfus Jr., in Montgomery, Alabama, United States (d. 2009)
  - Robertson Davies, Canadian novelist, author of The Deptford Trilogy including Fifth Business, The Cornish Trilogy and The Salterton Trilogy, recipient of the Order of Canada; as William Robertson Davies, in Thamesville, Ontario, Canada (d. 1995)
  - Richard Tucker, American opera singer, known for his collaborations with Metropolitan Opera; in New York City, United States (d. 1975)

== August 29, 1913 (Friday) ==
- General Lucio Blanco, rebel commander in the Mexican Revolution, began the redistribution of land in the states of Nuevo León and Tamaulipas.
- Theo Heemskerk, Prime Minister of the Netherlands, dissolved his cabinet and was replaced by Pieter Cort van der Linden to form a new government for the Netherlands.
- Born:
  - Jan Ekier, Polish composer, recipient of the Order of the White Eagle; in Krakau, Austria-Hungary (present-dayKraków, Poland) (d. 2014)
  - Sylvia Fine, American composer, known for her collaborations with Danny Kaye; in New York City, United States (d. 1991)
  - Jackie Mitchell, American baseball player, first female professional pitcher; as Virne Beatrice Mitchell, in Chattanooga, Tennessee, United States (d. 1987)

== August 30, 1913 (Saturday) ==
- French Jesuit priest Pierre Teilhard de Chardin, assisting on the expedition to locate further remains of the Piltdown Man, found a canine tooth that perfectly fit the skull of the alleged early ancestor of homo sapiens.
- A fourth hurricane in the storm season formed off between Bermuda and The Bahamas before moving northwest to the East Coast of the United States.
- The U.S. Naval Air Service was established upon recommendation of Admiral George Dewey. On January 20, the Naval Air Station Pensacola would be created in Pensacola, Florida.
- Eight men and one woman aboard the tugboat Alice were killed when the boilers exploded as the boat was towing barges on the Ohio River near Coraopolis, Pennsylvania. The force of the blast hurled one of the boilers a distance of 1,600 feet (490 m). Six other persons survived and were rescued by a passing steamer, the Harriet.
- The Bronx Opera House held its first show in New York City.
- American sailing ship Amaranth was wrecked on the southeastern shore of Jarvis Island in the Pacific Ocean.
- Born:
  - Richard Stone, British economist, recipient of the 1984 Nobel Memorial Prize in Economic Sciences for developing the national accounts and input–output model; as John Richard Nicholas Stone, in London, England (d. 1991)
  - Thomas F. Torrance, Scottish theologian, known for his work on systematic theology; Chengdu, Sichuan, Republic of China (present-day China) (d. 2007)

== August 31, 1913 (Sunday) ==
- The last barrier to the Pacific side of the Panama Canal was opened with the explosion of 44,800 pounds (20,300 kg) of dynamite, allowing the Pacific Ocean to flow into the locks at Miraflores. Work began two days later "to remove the last barrier of the Atlantic Channel."
- Chinese government troops retook the city of Nanjing from rebels.
- A provisional government was set up to govern Western Thrace between Turkey and Greece into order to keep the former Ottoman territory lost in the First Balkan War out of Bulgarian control. The republic was short-lived and dissolved by October.
- The Dublin lock-out strike took a deadly turn when the Dublin Metropolitan Police killed one demonstrator and injured 500 more in dispersing the street-car strike protesters. Thirty people were arrested, including the Irish Transport Union leader, James Larkin, whose attempt to address the crowd from a hotel balcony was followed by the police intervention. The burial of James Nolan, three days later, was attended by 50,000 people.

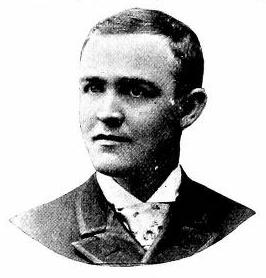
Unidentified accident victim for two weeks, U.S. Congressman Timothy Sullivan.

- United States Congressman Timothy Sullivan, who had represented New York's 13th congressional district (and upper Manhattan) since March, was struck and dismembered by a train in New York City. Sullivan, who had also represented the state in Congress from 1903 to 1906 remained unidentified for several days and was set to be sent to a potter's field for the poor, but was recognized on September 13 by a policeman, after which he received a large funeral.
- The association football (soccer) team PSV Eindhoven was established by Philips Sport Vereniging in Eindhoven in the Netherlands.
- Born:
  - Ray Dandridge, African American baseball player enshrined in the Baseball Hall of Fame. He starred in the Negro Leagues and was later the first African American (in 1949) in the minor league American Association; as Raymond Emmet Dandridge, in Richmond, Virginia, United States (d. 1994)
  - Jacques Foccart, French politician, co-founder of the Service d'Action Civique; in Ambrières-les-Vallées, Mayenne departément, France (d. 1997)
  - Helen Levitt, American photographer, best known for her contemporary look at the streets of New York City; in New York City, United States (d. 2009)
  - Bernard Lovell, English physicist and astronomer, first director of the Jodrell Bank Observatory; as Alfred Charles Bernard Lovell, in Oldland Common, South Gloucestershire, England (d. 2012)
