= A Bend in the Ganges =

Novel by the Indian author Manohar Malgonkar

A Bend in the Ganges (1964) is a historic-fiction novel by the Indian author Manohar Malgonkar. The novel opens with the civil disobedience movement of the early 1930s and ends with the partition riots in Punjab. It encompasses notable historic events in the Indian history of the Swadeshi movement, the activities of the freedom fighters, the outbreak of the Second World War, the British retreat from Rangoon, the Bombay dock explosion and the division of India in 1947. The epigraph of this novel is from the Ramayana: "At a bend in the Ganges, they paused to take a look at the land they were leaving".

== Plot ==
This story revolves around three male protagonists: Gian Talwar- who is very much influenced by the Gandhian ideology of non-violence; Debi Dayal and Shafi Usman are other two who often use "Jai-Ram: Jai Rahim" slogan to equate their feeling toward secularism. The fundamental difference between Talwar and Debi-Shafi duo lies in their ideology. As Talwar picks 'Gandhian nonviolence' as his way to fight against the British atrocities, Debi-Shafi finds violence as the only option left with them. However, Talwar murders his brother's assassinator in a feat of rage and is sentence to imprisonment at Cellular Jail in Andaman. Freedom fighters also establish "The Hanuman Club", an institution for their physical and spiritual upliftment in a country which is immensely divided due to its variations in political ideology and religious fragility. Talwar and Debi escape the prison and their lives interlace when they return back to India.

== Reception ==
This is Malgaonkar's fourth novel and it is counted amongst the various notable fictional accounts of Indian partition like Chaman Nahal's Azadi (1975), Khushwant Singh's Train to Pakistan (1956) and Kartar Singh Duggal's Twice Born Twice Dead (1979); but with a difference that it encompasses wider events in the storyline. Malgaonkar emphasises on "self-consuming nature of violence", by including deaths of Debi Dayal and Shafi; who were both violent characters by nature. Meghnad Desai, Baron Desai writes that "Malgonkar paints, on a big canvas, a picture of India during the Quit India years and the Partition. He has a miniaturist’s eye and an architect’s grand vision."
