= Chaman Nahal =

Indian-born writer of English literature

- Born: 1927; Sialkot, Punjab, British India
- Died: 2013 (aged 85–86); New Delhi, India
- Occupations: writer and professor
- Spouse: Sudarshna Nahal
- Children: Ajanta kohli, Anita Nahal
- Awards: Sahitya Academy Award (1977); Federation of Indian Publishers award, (1977); Federation of Indian Publishers award, (1979)

Chaman Nahal (1927–2013), commonly known as C Nahal and Chaman Nahal Azadi, was an Indian writer of English literature. He was widely considered one of the best exponents of Indian writing in English and is known for his work, Azadi, which is set on India's Independence and her partition. He is also known for his depiction of Mahatma Gandhi as a complex character with human failings.

== Life and career ==
Chaman Nahal was born in Sialkot, in British India, present day Pakistan, in 1927. After having done his school education locally, he did his master's in English at University of Delhi in 1948. He continued his education as a British Council Scholar at University of Nottingham (1959–61) and obtained a PhD in English in 1961. While attaining his education, he worked as a lecturer (1949–1962). In 1962, he joined Rajasthan University, Jaipur as reader in English. The next year, he moved to New Delhi as professor of English at the University of New Delhi. He was a Fulbright fellow at Princeton University, New Jersey and served as a visiting professor at various universities in the United States, Malaysia, Japan, Singapore, Canada and North Korea. He was also a fellow at Cambridge College in 1991 and worked as columnist for the Indian Express, writing a column talking about books from 1966 to 1973. He died on 29 November 2013 in New Delhi, India.

== List of works ==
Novels

Work	Publisher	Year
My True Faces	Orient	1973
Into Another Dawn	Sterling	1977
The English Queens	Vision	1979
Sunrise in Fiji	Allied	1988
Azadi (Freedom)	Arnold-Heinemann & Boston; Houghton Mifflin	1975
The Crown and the Loincloth	Vikas	1981
The Salt of Life	Allied	1990
The Triumph of the Tricolour	Allied	1993
The Gandhi Quartet	Allied	1993

Short story collection

Work	Publisher	Year
The Weird Dance and Other Stories	Arya	1965

Uncollected short stories

Work	Publisher	Year
"Tons"	The Statesman	1977
"The Light on the Lake"	Illustrated Weekly of India	1984
"The Take Over"	Debonair	1984

Others

Work	Publisher	Year
Moby Dick (for children), adaptation of the novel by Herman Melville	Eurasia	1965
A Conversation with J. Krishnamurti	Arya	1965
D.H. Lawrence: An Eastern View	South Brunswick, NJ, A.S. Barnes	1971
The Narrative Pattern in Ernest Hemingway's Fiction	Vikas New Delhi & Rutherford, New Jersey; Fairleigh Dickinson University Press	1971
Drugs and the Other Self: An Anthology of Spiritual Transformations	Harper	1971
The New Literatures in English	Allied	1985
The Bhagavad Gita	Pitamber	1987
Jawaharlal Nehru as a Man of Letters	Allied	1990

Bibliography

In The New Literatures in English, 1985

Critical Studies on Chaman Nahal

Work	Author/editor	Publisher	Year
Commonwealth Literature in the Curriculum	K.L. Goodwin	University of Queensland Press	1980
Introduction to The Crown and the Loincloth	A Komorov	Raduga	1984
Three Contemporary Novelists: Khushwant Singh, Chaman Nahal, and Salman Rushdie	R.K. Dhawan	Classical	1985

Memoir

Work	Publisher	Year
Silent Life	Roli Books	2005

Children's novels

Work	Publisher	Year
Akela and the Blue Monster	Aruvik & Allied	2007
Akela and the Asian Tsunami	Aruvik & Allied	2009
Akela and the UFOs	Aruvik & Allied	2009

== Literary review ==
Chaman Nahal's writings are known to talk about India without any touch of exoticism. Azadi, his novel on the partition of India, is widely considered to be the best of the Indian-English novels written about the traumatic partition which accompanied Indian Independence in 1947 (Quoted from '’Train to Pakistan – Azadi : Vice-versa Journey'’ by Dr. Mangalkumar R. Patil). An autobiographical book, Silent Life, was originally written in English and later translated into 12 languages, including Russian, Hungarian and Sinhalese.

== Awards and honours ==
Award	Year
Sahitya Akademi Award	1977
Federation of Indian Publishers award	1977
Federation of Indian Publishers award	1979
