= 1913 Australian Labor Party leadership spill =

Australian Labor Party leadership spill, 1913
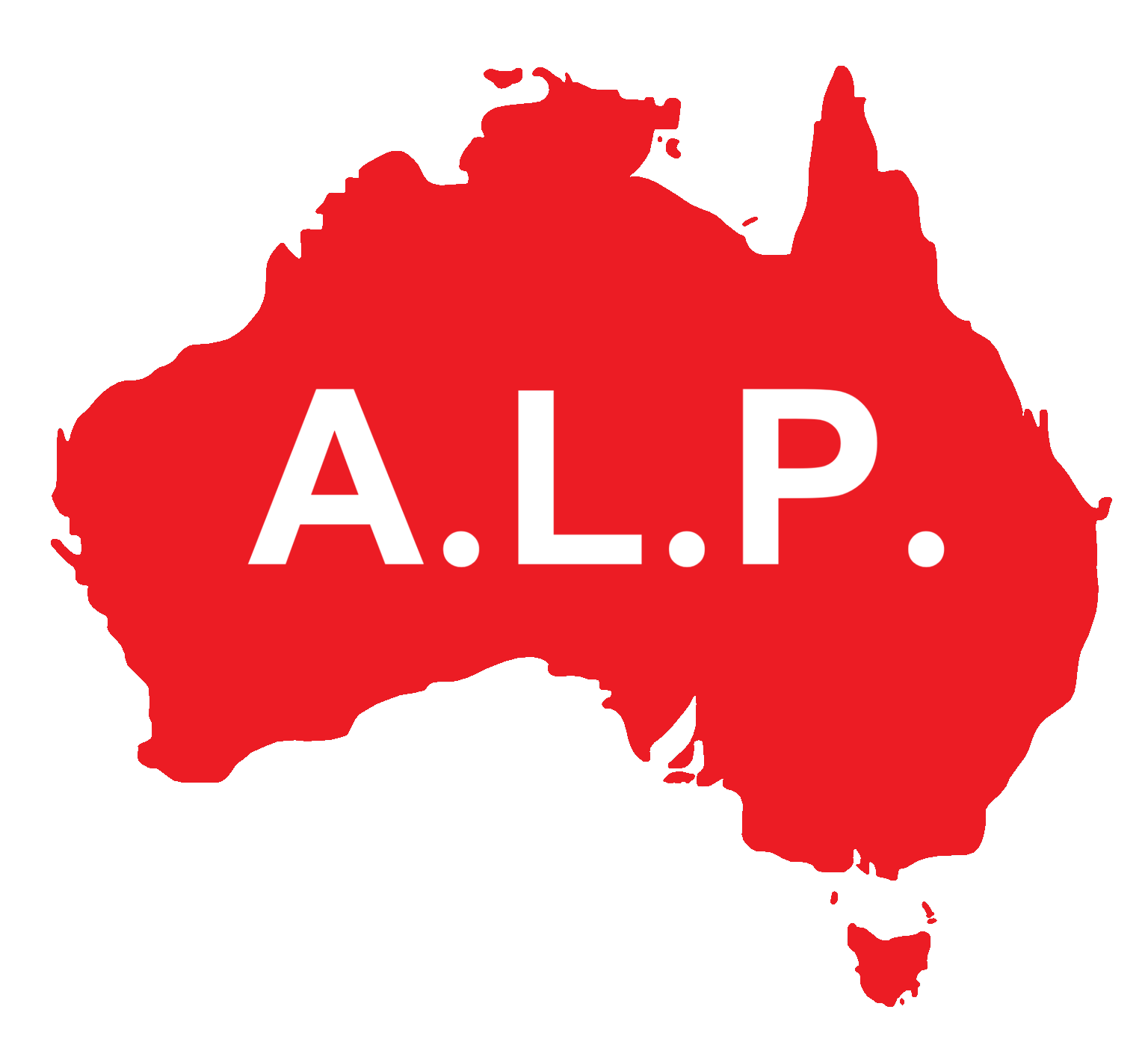
- 8 July 1913
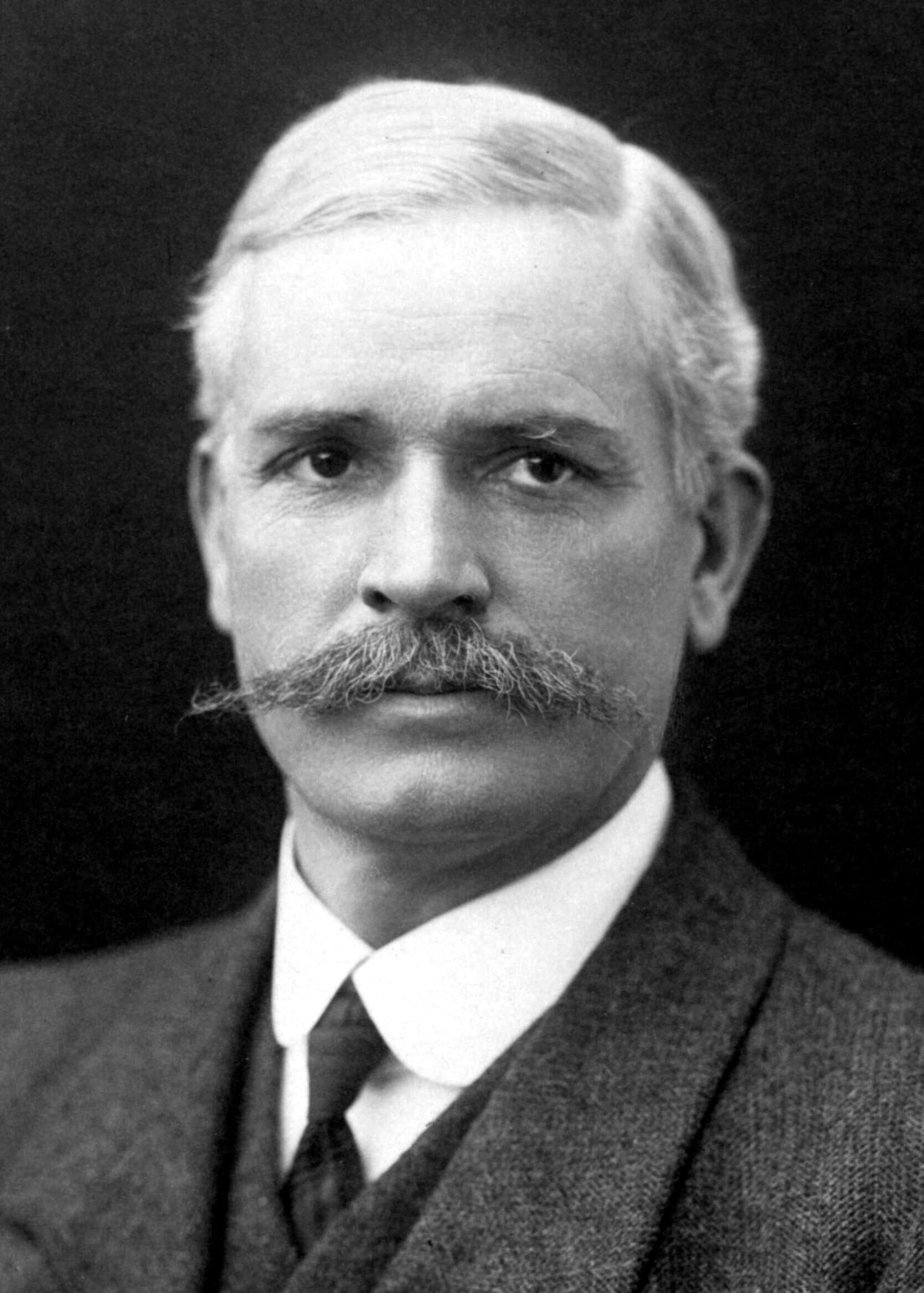

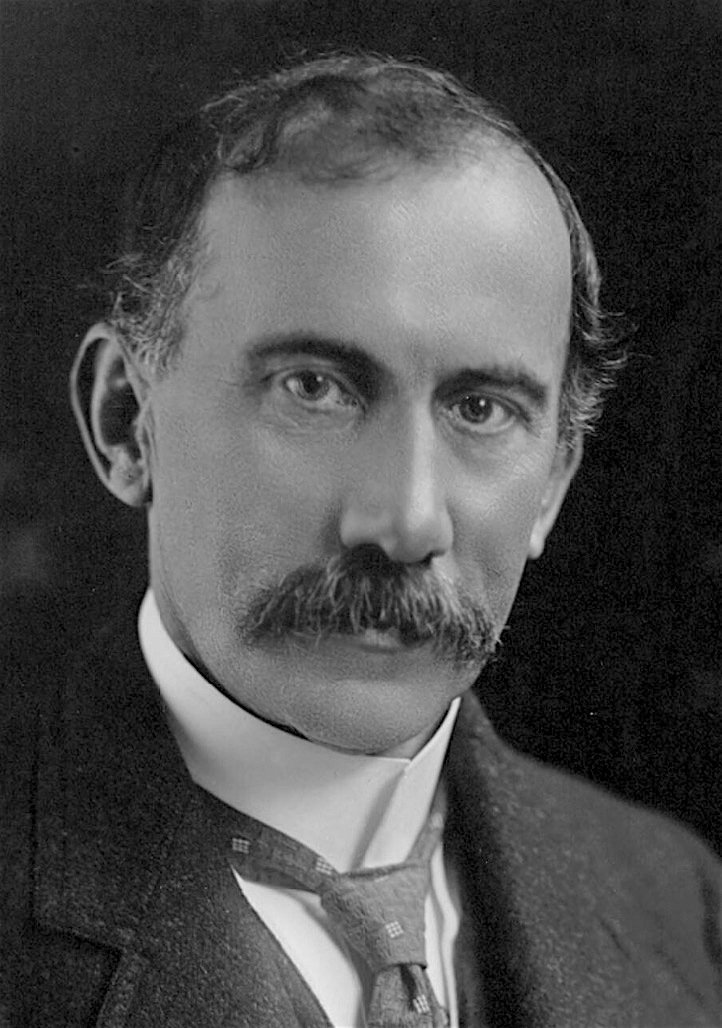

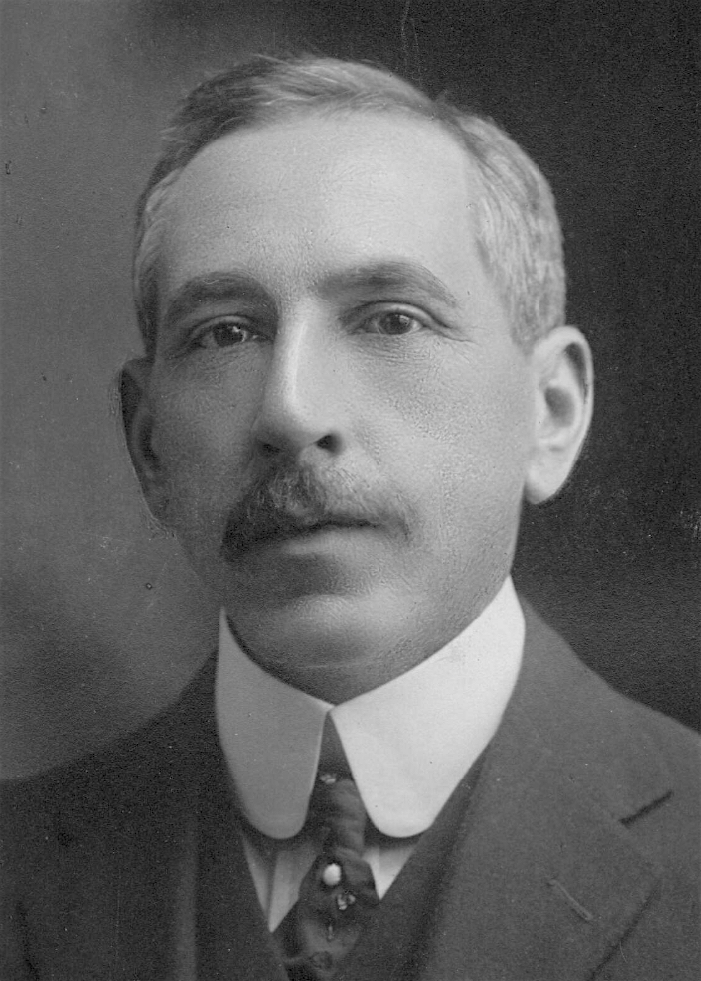
Candidate	Andrew Fisher	William Higgs	Billy Hughes?
First Ballot	36–42	18–21	1?
Leader before election
Andrew Fisher
Elected Leader
Andrew Fisher

The Australian Labor Party held a leadership spill on 8 July 1913, following the party's defeat at the May 1913 federal election. Andrew Fisher was re-elected to the leadership, defeating William Higgs. It was the first occasion on which a sitting leader had faced a challenge.

== Background ==
Fisher had been elected to the party leadership in 1907, in place of Chris Watson. After a brief period of governing in minority from 1908 to 1909, he led Labor to majority government for the first time at the 1910 election. However, his government was defeated by Joseph Cook's Liberal Party at the 1913 election. The party's loss of power after only a single term brought leadership tensions to the forefront, with James Catts one of the leading agitators. Those opposed to Fisher rallied behind William Higgs, a fellow Queenslander who had been a backbencher throughout the duration of the recent government.

As expected, Fisher won an absolute majority on the first ballot. In his official history of the Labor Party, Ross McMullin states that caucus minutes recorded the result as 42 votes for Fisher, 18 for Higgs, and one for Billy Hughes (who did not actually nominate for the position). David Day, one of Fisher's biographers, also gives those figures. However, contemporary newspapers reported that only 57 members of the caucus were in attendance, and that Higgs had won 21 votes; Hughes was not mentioned as a candidate. The party's official announcement of the caucus proceedings made no mention of any challenge to Fisher, and the exact results did not become known to the general public until the following week, when they were leaked to the press by Labor MPs.
