= The Devil's Wind =

Book by Manohar Malgonkar

- Author: Manohar Malgonkar
- Language: English
- Genre: Historical novel
- Publisher: Hamish Hamilton
- Publication date: 1972
- Publication place: India
- Media type: Print (Hardcover)
- Pages: 306
- ISBN: 0-241-02176-6

The Devil's Wind is a historical novel by Manohar Malgonkar that tells the story of Nana Saheb, the heir of the last Peshwa of the Maratha Confederacy, who played a leading role in the 1857 War of Independence. It provides a sympathetic portrait of a man whom the British portrayed as a great villain, and is based on historical sources as far as possible. The book is written as an autobiography in which Nana Saheb describes his life in his own words.

== Plot ==
Nana Saheb was the adopted son of Bajirao II, the last Maratha Peshwa, and heir to his position as "prime minister" of the Maratha lands. He is raised in an immensely wealthy family and educated as a Brahmin and a prince, although his father's power had been taken away by the British. On his father's death the British do not recognize his title, but allow him to continue in his comfortable exile in the town of Bithoor. An urbane and sophisticated man, Nana Saheb is sympathetic to the British, several of whom are his close friends, but cannot accept their right to rule and exploit India.

When the mutiny breaks out in May 1857, Nana Sahib finds himself forced to accept a position of leadership. After a long and ultimately futile struggle in which both sides commit many atrocities, Nana Sahib flees to Nepal where he receives a grudging sanctuary, taking with him an English woman he has rescued and with whom he has fallen in love. Many years later, he revisits India and then travels on to safety in Istanbul, the place where he sets down his memoirs.

== Major themes ==
The Devil's Wind is a painstaking literary work that blends beautifully the artist and the historian. The book is both an epic and an autobiography. Malgonkar's purpose is to rehabilitate Nana Saheb, maligned as a monster by British propaganda, by telling the story from the Indian point of view in Nana Saheb own words. Malgonkar's Nana Sahib is an affectionate, soft-hearted, generous and cultivated nobleman, free from prejudice and governed by common sense and reason.

With skill and reticence, Malgomkar reconstructs the picture of India, with Kanpur as its microcosm, growing suspicious, aggrieved, alienated, hostile, rebellious, enraged and vengeful by degrees. He presents a convincing picture of the Indian reaction to British provocations, describes their hesitance and disunity at the time of the early "rebel" victories, and their growing determination mingled with despair as the tide turns against them.

Nana Saheb inherits from his adoptive father a delight in sex, and this theme recurs throughout the book. Malgonkar treats the women in his book sympathetically, and grants their right to sexual choice. The book gives a powerful portrayal of Kashi, Nana Sahib's third wife, who remains a virgin while with him because of his fear of a curse that says if he consummates a marriage the wife shall die, which had happened with his first two wives. Later, Kashi gains her freedom to love as she chooses in the court of Nepal.

=== Publication history ===
- 1972, UK, Hamish Hamilton ISBN 0-241-02176-6, Hardcover
- 1972, USA, Viking Press ISBN 0-670-27102-0, Hardcover
- 1988, UK, Penguin Books ISBN 0-14-011047-X, Paperback

=== Explanation of the novel's title ===
"The Devils Wind" is the name the sepoys gave to the mutiny, a barbaric, uncontrollable fury that swept across the hot plains of India as if blown by the Devil. It is another name for the Loo, the hot dry and gritty wind that blows in the plains of India before the monsoons bring relief. The protagonist's uncle was murdered by his own relatives for acquiring the throne. He haunts the subsequent rulers of the Maratha kingdom. Nanasaheb's predicament is this devil's wind and that explains the title, Devil's Wind.

== Literary significance and reception ==
P.P. Mehta in Indo-Anglian Fiction: An Assessment, described the book as "the first perfect historical novel of Indo-Anglian fiction." Dinesh Chandra Kumar notes that Malgonkar's moral views are deftly woven into the texture of his novels, sometimes expressed in a subtle way that is not perceivable by common eyes and minds. J.Y. Dayananda points out that Malgonkar "does not deal with the social and political realities of India but only with the social and political thinking of a small property-owning conservative class in India". However, Dayananda believes that The Devil's Wind is the "most profound fictional treatment of the rebellion of 1857 from an Indian point of view".

Reviewing the 1972 Edition, Books of The Times, USA wrote 'interesting, intriguing, very humane, convincing...Has the touch of Kipling genius for story telling'

Illustrated London News wrote 'Manohar Malgonkar is a master of English prose'
