= Courrier d'Ethiopie =

French-language newspaper in Ethiopia

Courrier d'Ethiopie ('Courier of Ethiopia') was a French language weekly newspaper published from Addis Ababa 1913–1936. The first issue came out on August 2, 1913. Courrier d'Ethiopie was the first foreign-language newspaper in Ethiopia. The newspaper was founded by Alexis Desvages, who also served as its editor until 1924. Soon after its foundation the newspaper reached a circulation of around 700. Initially all material in the newspaper was in French (i.e. Roman font), but soon advertisements in Amharic and, later, notices in Amharic began to appear in Courrier d'Ethiopie.

Publication was discontinued 1914–1917, when Desvages was doing military service.
