= Manohar Malgonkar =

Indian writer (1913–2010)

Manohar Malgonkar (12 July 1913 – 14 June, 2010) was an Indian author of both fiction and nonfiction in the English language. He was also an army officer, big game hunter, civil servant, mine owner, and farmer.

== Life ==
Malgonkar was born in Jagalbet, near Londa in Belgaum district. From his maternal side, his great-grandfather had been governor of Gwalior State. He began his education in Belgaum. He later attended school in Dharwad and graduated from Mumbai University. After, he joined the army and rose to the rank of Lieutenant Colonel in the Maratha Light Infantry. He retired from service at the age of 39. He also stood for parliament.

Most of that activity took place during the build-up to Indian independence and its aftermath, which often serve as the settings for his works. The socio-historical milieu of that era forms the backdrop of his novels, which typically focus on action and adventure. He also wrote non-fiction, including biography and history.

Malgonkar lived in a remote bungalow called "Burbusa Bungalow" located at Jagalbet in Joida Taluk in Uttara Kannada District, Karnataka. His only child Suneeta, who was educated at the famous Lawrence School, Sanawar, died in 1998.

== Works ==
For many years, Malgonkar wrote a weekly column covering a wide range of topics, which was published in Indian newspapers like The Statesman and Deccan Herald. Most of his books were published in India by Orient Paperbacks or by Rupa Paperbacks.

=== Novels ===
- The Sea Hawk: Life and Battles of Kanhoji Angrey (1959)
- Distant Drum (1960)
- A Combat of Shadows (1962)
- The Princes (1963)
- A Bend in the Ganges (1964)
- Spy in Amber (1965)
- The Devil’s Wind (on the life on Peshwa Nana Sahib) (1972)
- Shalimar (1978) [Novelization of the film Shalimar]
- Bandicoot Run (1982)

=== Historical accounts ===
- Puars (Pawars) of Dewas Senior (1963)
- Chhatrapatis of Kolhapur (1971)
- The Men Who Killed Gandhi (1978)
- Cue from the Inner Voice: The Choice Before Big Business (1980)
- Dropping Names (1996)

=== Short stories ===
- A Teller of Tales
- The Garland Keepers
- Cactus Country
- A Toast in Warm Wine and Other Short Stories (1974)
- In Uniform
- Bombay Beware (1975)
- Rumble-Tumble (1977)
- Four Graves and Other Stories (1990)
- Inside Goa
- Two Red Roosters
