= The Papers of Samuel Marchbanks =

1985 novel by Robertson Davies

- First edition cover
- Author: Robertson Davies
- Publisher: Clarke, Irwin & Company
- Publication date: 1985

The Papers of Samuel Marchbanks, published by Irwin in 1985, constitutes a collection of the writings of Samuel Marchbanks, a character created in 1944 by Canadian novelist and journalist Robertson Davies when he was editor of the Peterborough Examiner newspaper in the small city of Peterborough, Ontario, northeast of Toronto.

The Papers of Samuel Marchbanks is drawn from The Diary of Samuel Marchbanks (1947) and The Table Talk of Samuel Marchbanks (1949) as well as selections from Samuel Marchbanks' Almanack, published in 1967.

This book is presented as a "scholarly edition" of Marchbanks' writings, presented and edited by his "friend", Robertson Davies.
