= Toronto Trilogy =

Toronto Trilogy may refer to novel series by:

- An unfinished trilogy by Robertson Davies, of which the author completed two novels, Murther and Walking Spirits (1991) and The Cunning Man (1994).
- Austin Clarke, a series consisting of The Meeting Point (1967), Storm of Fortune (1973) and The Bigger Light (1975)
