= Verse drama and dramatic verse =

Literary form

Verse drama is any drama written significantly in verse (that is: with line endings) to be performed by an actor before an audience. Although verse drama does not need to be primarily in verse to be considered verse drama, significant portions of the play should be in verse to qualify. Verse drama is primarily spoken, and therefore libretti or books of musicals with song lyrics also written in verse are not considered verse drama. Verse drama may also include portions which are formatted into paragraphs (prose).

For a very long period, verse drama was the dominant form of drama in Europe (and was also important in non-European cultures). Greek tragedy and Racine's plays are written in verse, as is almost all of William Shakespeare's, Ben Jonson's and John Fletcher's drama, and other works like Goethe's Faust and Henrik Ibsen's early plays. In most of Europe, verse drama has remained a prominent art form; while at least popularly, it has been tied almost exclusively to Shakespeare in the English tradition. In the English language, verse drama has continued to the present day.

== History ==
Dramatic verse occurs in a dramatic work, such as a play, composed with line breaks, rather than formatted in paragraph. These lines often, although not always, are written in a poetic style or with heightened speech ("poetic drama"). Similarly, these lines often, although not always, possess some form of meter (e.g., iambic pentameter, dactylic hexameter, etc.).

=== Greek and Roman Colometry ===
The tradition of dramatic verse in the West may be traced back to the invention of colometry as introduced by Aristophanes of Byzantium at the Library of Alexandria in the third century BCE. Since ancient languages across the globe were typically written in scriptio continua, the Alexandrian school sought to improve reading comprehension by the introduction not only of proto-punctuation, but also by placing intentional line breaks, known as per cola et commata (collectively: colometry). These line breaks would be placed for one of three primary reasons: sense, such as breaking at the end of a sentence or a clause; pause; or to mark meter.

Scribes preserved the Alexandrian school's colometry, thus leading to contemporary publications of Greek drama duplicating what is, effectively, editorial and not authorial line break. This editorial insertion of line break also led to presumptions regarding performance of verse plays. As M. L. West writes:

Until Aristophanes of Byzantium (or whoever it was) taught copyists to divide [lines] in dimeters, [scribes] were unaware that anapestic passages were composed on this principle [e.g., colometrics], or they attached no importance to it. We have no evidence for the existence of any doctrine on the subject before the change takes place. [...Wilamowitz's] predecessors had taken anapestic dimeters and monometers simply as observed realities. Several of them supposed that the monometer must have occupied the same time as the dimeter, being delivered at half the speed of accompanied by a sizeable pause [...] For Wilamowitz, on the other hand, the fact that anapests are written in dimeters in books was a fact about books and not about anapests.

Colometry, as well as Aristophanes' punctuation system, fell in and out of use during the rise of the Roman Empire. The division of paragraphs into lines of what we now recognize as verse—either metered or free—was gatekept by the wealthy and educated.

Cicero, for example, one of Rome’s most famous public speakers, told his rapt audiences that the end of a sentence “ought to be determined not by the speaker’s pausing for breath, or by a stroke interposed by a copyist, but by the constraint of the rhythm”.

Around 410 CE, St. Jerome repopularized colometry with the distribution of his Vulgate Bible. Jerome numbered these Biblical 'verses' in accordance with the Greek custom of stichometry, or counting of lines. Many of these verses were divided for sense and breath, rather than meter, and continue into contemporary publications.

=== Medieval Anglophone Drama and Rhyming Plays ===
Medieval Anglophone dramas, which were dominated by morality, miracle, and mystery plays, as well as court masques, were written entirely in rhyming verse. Typically, plays were composed of rhyming couplets, such as the earliest extant Anglophone play, Interludium de clerico et puella. Other rhyme schemes were occasionally used, such as quatrains with an ABAB or ABCB pattern. Certain playwrights were known for their original rhyme schemes, including the Wakefield Master, who wrote The Second Shepherd's Play, or John Skelton who wrote in a variety of rhyme schemes with short lines known as 'skeltonics'.

Rhyming drama remained the uncontested norm at least from c. 1300 CE until the latter half of the sixteenth century. In 1570, Roger Ascham's The Scholemaster was published posthumously. One section in particular, 'Criticism of recent English verse' railed vehemently against the custom of English rhyme. Since there had been an influx of Greek and Roman texts, particularly Virgil, Horace, Cicero and others into England at this time, Ascham wished:

[...] that we Englishmen likewise would acknowledge and vnderstand rightfully our rude beggerly ryming, brought first into Italie by Gothes and Hunnes, when all good verses and all good learning to, were destroyed by them [...] But now, when men know the difference, and haue the examples, both of the best, and of the worst, surelie, to follow rather the Gothes in Rhyming, than the Greekes in trew versifying, were euen to eate ackornes with swyne, when we may freely eate wheate bread emonges men.

This movement against English rhyme coincided with the interest in establishing a type of Anglophone scansion or prosody: that is, translating ideas of iambs and other metrical patterns from the Greco-Roman long-short qualitative meter to the Anglophone strong-soft syllabic-accentual meter. George Gascoigne and Sir Philip Sydney were instrumental in arguing for Anglophone meter, which might be used to displace and refine what was perceived as passé English rhyme.

=== Early Modern Drama and the Rise of Blank Verse ===
Between 1559 and 1561, two metric forms fought for dominance within Anglophone verse drama. Translations of Seneca, such as Jasper Heywood's Troas (1559), Thyestes (1560) and Hercules Furens (1561) were written in 'fourteeners': metric lines of iambic heptameter, resulting in fourteen syllables. Heywood maintained rhyming couplets, resulting in a form very similar to ballad or common meter with an ABCB rhyme scheme. The fourteener was an attempt to duplicate the Greek and Latin dactylic hexameter, which contains seventeen to eighteen syllables. Fourteeners tend to use iambs rather than trochees, following the preference put forth by Ascham, Gascoigne, Sidney, and Spenser. As Samuel Johnson later noted, fourteeners with their consistent caesura, or pause, at the eighth syllable are particularly suited for 'our lyric measures'. Indeed, the ballad and fourteeners have remained popular among poets and lyricists for this very reason. However, for whatever reason, fourteeners did not emerge as the dominant metric language.

In 1561, The Tragedie of Gorboduc, or, Ferrex and Porrex by Thomas Norton and Thomas Sackville performed before Queen Elizabeth. Although there is some question of how widely spread the play became, for the first time on the English stage what would become known as 'blank verse' was introduced. Blank verse refers to verse which does not rhyme. Since Gorboduc not only used blank verse, which would have been audible to an audience, as well as iambic pentameter, which would have been legible to a readership, the term 'blank verse' has typically been conflated to mean unrhymed lines of iambic pentameter. Given the growing dislike of English rhyme, the introduction of blank verse which seemed to hearken to the unrhymed verse of Greek drama, as it had been copied down from Aristophanes' editorial intervention.

Further innovations were introduced in the following decades. Gascoigne translated the first prose [paragraph] play, Supposes in 1566, after Ludivoco Ariosto's Italian play, I Suppositi. Since Supposes was a comedy, this likely influenced the Early Modern use of prose—that is colloquial language formatted into paragraph—for comedy rather than tragedy: as can be seen in several of Shakespeare's plays, including the bourgeoisie comedy, The Merry Wives of Windsor (1602) which is almost entirely in prose. Similarly, Ben Jonson's comedies, Epicoene, or the Silent Woman (1609) and Bartholomew Fair (1614) were written entirely in prose.

Edmund Spenser's The Faerie Queene (1590) popularized the Spenserian stanza: eight lines of iambic pentameter, followed by a single alexandrine in iambic hexameter. The final two lines would rhyme, thus creating a type of closing sound. This ending couplet was used extensively in Elizabethan verse dramas, especially to end a scene or punctuate a dramatic point. However, Elizabethan verse dramas tended to end on two rhyming lines of iambic pentameter, rather than writing in alexandrines. A famous ending couplet is Shakespeare's conclusion to Romeo and Juliet (1597): 'For never was a story of more woe / Than this of Juliet and her Romeo' (V.3.320-321). Although alexandrines did not become popular in Elizabethan drama, they became the standard meter for French verse drama.

One of the great champions of iambic pentmeter in blank verse was Christopher Marlowe, whose 'mighty line' made the five pulses of pentameter felt by the audience. Perhaps the most famous example of this mighty line is found in Doctor Faustus, when the titular character looks upon Helen of Troy and declares: 'Was this the face that launched a thousand ships, / And burnt the topless towers of Ilium? (1604 Quarto, 162-163).

Although rhyming poetry persisted for some time, and prose plays rose in popularity, Anglophone verse drama began to become synonymous with iambic pentameter in blank verse. Moreover, as prose began to be increasingly aligned with comedy, verse drama was similarly considered the proper milieu of the high, 'noble' or tragic.

=== Closet Drama and the British Commonwealth ===
When Cromwell closed the theatres in 1642, Anglophone drama was relegated to the drawing room, to be performed privately among friends and family. This popularised closet dramas which were not necessarily meant to be performed in front of commercial audiences, but enjoyed by primarily by readers. Scholar Alfred Harbage estimated that "roughly 150 closet plays were written between 1500 and 1660." "In the eighteen years between 1642 and 1660, usually considered a wasteland of dramatic writing due to the government bans on public performance, some ninety [90] closet plays were written, three times as many as in the four previous decades." Many of these plays were by female authors, who were also forbidden from performing on English stages, until the reopening of the theatres under Charles II.

Prior to the closing of the theatres, the Sidney Circle was a prominent group of men and women, closely associated with or influenced by Mary Sidney, Countess of Pembroke, the sister of Philip Sidney. The Sidney Circle produced eleven closet dramas:

- Antonius (1592) by Mary Sidney; a translation of Robert Garnier's Marc-Antoine. Although the original is written in rhyming French alexandrines, Sidney renders her translation into blank verse in iambic pentameter.
- Cornélia (1594) by Thomas Kyd; a translation of Garnier's Cornelie.
- The Tragedie of Cleopatra (1594) by Samuel Daniel
- Octavia (1598) by Samuel Brandon
- Alaham and Mustapha (1603) by Fulke Greville
- Darius and Croesus (1604), The Alexandrean Tragedy (1605) and Julius Caesar (1607) by William Alexander
- The Tragedie of Miriam (1613) by Elizabeth Cary. As Roman Wray notes, "As the first original drama authored [not translated] by a woman, we might expect Miriam to occupy an important position in theatre history."

These plays were generally neoclassical in form, including choruses and following the Greek tradition of keeping battles and bloodshed off-stage. While the plays tended to favor iambic pentameter, they often experimented with rhyme scheme, such as Cleopatra's opening monologue in ABAB quatrains. Several of these playwrights employed sequences of rhyme royal: an intricate rhyming form introduced by Geoffrey Chaucer in the fourteenth century.

In translating Garnier, who himself was translating Greek and Latin plays into French, it may be considered that the Sidney Circle were translating closet dramas into closet dramas."For [Garnier's] tragedies, though some of them may have been presented, were poems written to be read [...] He is working at literature, not at drama." A similar critique may be laid to closet dramas, which tend to be more adventurous as poetic forms, but perhaps less workable as dramas. As Jonas Barish commented, closet dramas share "a preoccupation with language, but vary considerably in 'hypothetical stageability'." This tension between poet and playwright would continue through to the present day, particularly as realized by T. S. Eliot in his essay, "The Three Voices of Poetry" (1954).

Nevertheless, the closet drama served as an important bridge between the stage traditions of the Caroline and Restoration periods. Many of them were political, in defiance of theatrical censorship. Since music was allowed during the Commonwealth, many of these closet dramas—even those written primarily in prose, such as The Concealed Fansyes by sisters Jane Cavendish and Elizabeth Brackley (1645)--included places for songs with original lyrics. This would pave the way for later operas and burlesques.

=== Rhyme vs. Blank Verse: Dryden and Milton's Literary Wars ===
The Restoration ushered in several changes in Anglophone drama: women were allowed to perform publicly on the stage, prose dramas became increasingly popular, and in the latter half of the seventeenth century John Milton and John Dryden became figureheads for a literary war over the place of rhyme in verse drama.

Although Milton was more known for his narrative poems, such as Paradise Lost (1667), he did contribute two masques before the revolution: Arcades (1634) and Comus (1637); and one closet drama, Samson Agonistes (1671) after the restoration of Charles II to the throne of England. While the masques were both written in rhyme with variable meter, Samson Agonistes was written in iambic pentameter blank verse. In the 'revised and augmented' publication of Paradise Lost in 1674, Milton explained his preference for unrhymed verse, in words very like Ascham's Scholmaster a century before.

The Measure is English Heroic Verse without Rime, as that of Homer in Greek, and Virgil in Latin; Rhime being no necessary Adjunct or true Ornament of Poem or good Verse [...] Not without cause therefore some both Italian, and Spanish Poets of prime note have rejected Rhime both in longer and shorter Works, as have also long since our best English Tragedies [...] This neglect then of Rhime so little is to be taken for a defect, though it may seem so perhaps to vulgar Readers, that it rather is to be esteem'd an example set, the first in English, of ancient liberty recover'd to heroic Poem from the troublesom and modern bondage of Rimeing.

Conversely, John Dryden was well known as a dramatist, with at least twenty-five plays to his name, performed between 1663-1694. While Dryden did write in prose, such as his first comedy, The Wild Gallant (1663) he was well-known for writing tragedies in heroic couplets: that is, lines of rhyming iambic pentameter, such as Aureng-Zebe (1676).

In 1668, Dryden published 'Of Dramatick Poesie, An Essay'. The work, fashioned like a narrative journal or one of Socrates' conversations, considers Aristotle's Poetics as well as general thoughts about the English theatre. The final section argues about whether rhyme should be 'allowable in Serious plays'. A year later, Dryden published 'A Defence of An Essay of Dramatic Poesy' (1669), arguing against his brother-in-law and sometime dramatic collaborator, Sir Robert Howard's preference for blank verse. The central question of the time was not 'whether rhyme or not rhyme be best or most natural for a serious subject, but what is the nearest the nature of that it represents'. Although Dryden championed dramatic rhyme, in the prologue for Aureng-Zebe, he admitted: 'And to confess a truth, (though out of time) / Grows weary of his long'd Mistress, Rhyme.'

Interestingly, Dryden later went on with Milton's blessing to adapt Paradise Lost into the libretto for an opera, under the title The State of Innocence (1677). This was written partially in rhymed heroic couplets, and partially in blank verse. While Paradise Lost was not an immediate success, The State of Innocence became Dryden's best-seller. Poet Nathaniel Lee contributed as prologue poem to the first publication, declaring that Milton only 'roughly drew, on an old fashioned ground' (e.g., Elizabethan blank verse), while Dryden improved the text. 'His was the Golden Ore which you refined.'

Samuel Johnson, writing a century later in his Lives of the Poets (1779), suggested that Dryden's adherence to dramatic rhyme for tragedies was in some wise encouraged by Charles II.

The practice of making tragedies in rhyme was introduced soon after the restoration, as it seems, by [Roger Boyle] the earl of Orrery [who also wrote rhyming tragedies], in compliance with the opinion of Charles the second, who had formed his taste by the French theatre; and Dryden, who wrote, and made no difficulty of declaring that he wrote, only to please, and who, perhaps, knew that by his dexterity of versification he was more likely to excel others in rhyme than without it, very readily adopted his master's preference. He, therefore, made rhyming tragedies, till, by the prevalence of manifest propriety, he seems to have grown ashamed of making them any longer.

Public favor sided with Milton's poetic style over Dryden, banishing English rhyme to comic works, musical lyrics, and translations of French plays. Further, Dryden's blank verse reworkings of Shakespeare, such as All for Love, after Antony and Cleopatra, have thus far stood the test of time more than his rhyming plays.

=== Contemporary Revival in the 20th and 21st Century ===
Dramatic verse began to decline in popularity in the nineteenth century, when the prosaic and conversational styles of playwrights such as Henrik Ibsen became more prevalent, and were adapted in English by George Bernard Shaw. Verse drama did have a role in the development of Irish theatre through W. B. Yeats.

In the new millennium, there has been a resurgence in interest in the form of verse drama. Some of them came in blank verse or iambic pentameter and endeavour to be in conversation with Shakespeare's writing styles. King Charles III by Mike Bartlett, written in iambic pentameter, played on the West End and Broadway, as well as being filmed with the original cast for the BBC. Likewise, La Bete by David Hirson, which endeavours to recreate Moliere's farces in rhyming couplets, enjoyed several prominent productions on both sides of the Atlantic. David Ives, known best for his short, absurdist work, has turned to "transladaptation" (his word) in his later years: translating and updating French farces, such as The School for Lies and The Metromaniacs, both of which premiered in New York City. With the renewed interest in verse drama, theatre companies are looking for "new Shakespeare" plays to produce. In 2017, the American Shakespeare Center founded Shakespeare's New Contemporaries (SNC), which solicits new plays in conversation with Shakespeare's canon. This was partially in response to the Oregon Shakespeare Festival commissioning "modern English" versions of Shakespeare plays. SNC has been on hold since the start of the COVID-19 pandemic.

However, the twenty-first century also saw theatre practitioners using verse and hybrid forms in a much wider selection of dramatic texts and theatrical performances and forms than those inspired by Shakespeare. A transnational researcher, Kasia Lech, showed that contemporary practices reach for verse to test the boundaries of verse drama and its traditions in Western theatre, including English-language theatre but also Polish, Spanish, and Russian. Lech argues that verse is particularly relevant for contemporary theatre practice because the dialogical relationship between its rhythmic and lexical levels speaks to the globalized world's pluralistic nature. Lech discusses how artists such as Polish Radosław Rychcik and Spanish-British Teatro Inverso use verse in multilingual contexts "as a performative tool to engage with and reflect on interlingual processes as a socio-political force and as a platform for dramaturgies of foreignness." Nigerian playwright Inua Ellams explores his identity that escapes geographical, national, and temporal boundaries. Russian Olga Shilyaeva in her 2018 28 dney: Tragediya menstrualnogo tsikla (28 Days: The tragedy of a menstrual cycle) uses verse to talk about experience of menstruation. Irish Stefanie Preissner in her Our Father (2011) and Solpadeine Is My Boyfriend (2012) plays with autobiography and her multiple identities "as the character she performs, as the performer, the writer, and a voice of a young generation of Ireland facing the drastic political, social, and personal changes and desperately looking for predictability."

== Related Literary Forms ==
=== Closet drama ===
An important trend from around 1800 was the closet drama: a verse drama intended to be read from the page, rather than performed. Byron and Shelley, as well as a host of lesser figures, devoted much time to the closet verse or tragic drama, while also proclaiming that verse tragedy was already in a state of obsolescence. That is, while poets of the eighteenth century could write so-so poetic dramas, the public taste for new examples was already moving away by the start of the nineteenth century, and there was little commercial appeal in staging them.

Instead, opera would take up verse drama, as something to be sung: it is still the case that a verse libretto can be successful. Verse drama as such, however, in becoming closet drama, became simply a longer poetic form, without the connection to practical theatre and performance.

According to Robertson Davies in A Voice From the Attic, closet drama is "Dreariest of literature, most second hand and fusty of experience!" But indeed a great deal of it was written in Victorian times, and afterwards, to the extent that it became a more popular long form at least than the faded epic. Prolific in the form were, for example, Michael Field and Gordon Bottomley.

=== Dramatic Poetry ===
Dramatic poetry is any poetry that uses the discourse of the characters involved to tell a story or portray a situation.

The major types of dramatic poetry are those already discussed, to be found in plays written for the theatre, and libretti. There are further dramatic verse forms: these include dramatic monologues, such as those written by Robert Browning and Alfred Tennyson and Shakespeare.

== 20th and 21st Century Scholarship ==
With the prominence of W. B. Yeats and T. S. Eliot at the turn of the century regarding what Eliot termed 'poetic drama', several scholars began to chronicle 'modern' or 'contemporary' contributions to the field. This scholarship is interested in archiving and critiquing Anglophone verse drama since the late nineteenth century, as well as beginning to ask the question of what constitutes verse and/or poetic drama. Scholarship seems to be drawn both from practitioners and academics: roles which sometimes overlap.

Practitioners

- Mike Bartlett, 'How I wrote King Charles III' (2014). A first-hand account about the difficulties of mastering writing in iambic pentameter. This article equates all 'verse' with iambic pentameter.
- T. S. Eliot, 'The Possibility of a Poetic Drama', The Sacred Wood (1920). The first of Eliot's several essays, as a writer, considering the craft and possibility of 'reviving' verse or poetic drama.
- T. S. Eliot, 'Poetry and Drama' (1951) and 'The Three Voices of Poetry' (1953), On Poetry and Poets (1954). Two important essays as Eliot reflects back on what he learned from writing and having his verse dramas performed.
- Robert Icke, 'On verse and how it might be used', Works One, (2016). In his introduction to his transladapation in iambic pentameter of Schiller's Mary Stuart, the playwright and director offers some commentary on contemporary verse speaking.
- Glyn Maxwell, 'Space', On Poetry (2012). While much of Maxwell's book may be applied to verse drama, in this chapter he speaks specifically of his experience working with and trusting actors for his verse dramas.
- Richard O'Brien, 'Community and Conflict: A Practitioner's Perspective on Verse Drama' (2018). O'Brien completed his doctoral thesis tracing the influence of Shakespeare's work on Anglophone verse drama, and then considering what he learned in writing contemporary iambic pentameter plays. This article from the University of Birmingham distills that latter portion.
- Richard O'Brien, Shakespeare and the Development of Verse Drama, 1660-2017 (September 2017). O'Brien's thesis, housed at the University of Birmingham, tracing the influence of Shakespeare on Anglophone verse drama, as well as considering his own experience writing and producing original iambic pentameter blank verse plays.
- Sean O'Brien, 'The Poet in the Theatre: Verse Drama', The Handbook of Creative Writing. The author considers Anglophone verse drama, and the tensions of contemporary theatre companies who prefer prose.
- Peter Oswald, 'On Schiller and Contemporary Verse Drama' (c. 2005). A brief blog from verse dramatist and poet Peter Oswald on his love for Schiller and championing strong meter in verse drama. He also reflects briefly on the original cast for his translation of Mary Stuart.

Academics

- Sarah Bay-Cheng and Barbara Cole, Poets at Play: An Anthology of Modernist Drama (2010). This book is not exclusively interested in verse drama (drama written in lines with intentional line break), but rather chronicles the dramas of Modernist poets, with chapters on Wallace Stevens, Edna St. Vincent Millay, H. D. (Hilda Doolittle), e. e. cummings, Marita Bonner, William Carlos Williams, Gertrude Stein and Ezra Pound.
- Sarah Berry, Staging the Lyric: Modern and Contemporary Experiments with Verse Drama (2025). Berry adds a unique contribution to the field of verse drama by considering plays written in lyric verse. She expands the canon by considering female, non-British, and experimental playwrights and ensembles.
- Vera Cantoni, New Playwriting at Shakespeare's Globe (2018). Cantoni is interested in how the shape of Shakespeare's Globe and the actors' proximity to the audience affects the modern playwrights. While not all the plays discussed are in verse, consideration is given to 'language centre-stage'.
- Denis Donoghue, The Third Voice: Modern British and American Verse Drama (1959). This book examines the poetic verse dramas of several notable poet-playwrights, giving particular attention to the corpus of T. S. Eliot, from whom Donoghue draws his title. His final chapter includes some thoughts on verse speaking.
- Arnold P. Hinchliffe, Modern Verse Drama (1977). A short monograph which functions as a stepping-stone between Donoghue and Leeming, asking the question of what differentiates, if anything, verse from poetic drama.
- Kasia Lech, Dramaturgy of Form: Performing Verse in Contemporary Theatre (2021). A monograph considering global and marginalized verse drama, especially as it is realized through feminist and multicultural lenses.
- Glenda Leeming, Poetic Drama (1989). An answering to Donoghue's limited survey of twentieth century verse dramatists, with an expanded canon of plays. Leeming also considers how poetic drama may apply to works formatted in paragraph but with poetic language, such as Dylan Thomas' Under Milk Wood.
- James Moran, Modernists and the Theatre: The Drama of W. B. Yeats, Ezra Pound, D. H. Laurence, James Joyce, T. S. Eliot and Virginia Woolf (2022). Although not explicitly considering the verse or poetic nature of these plays, nevertheless, the majority of the authors Moran considers are poetic playwrights. A fascinating look at the overlapping history of these playwrights, and their effect upon each other.
- Irene Morra, Verse Drama in England, 1900-2015: Art, Modernity and the National Stage (2016). Morra limits her survey to the United Kingdom, with the particular interest in the then-prominent blank verse play, King Charles III by Mike Bartlett. Her interest in expanding the canon is similar to Leeming's, with time dedicated to Caryl Churchill's Serious Money, and other feminist authors.
- Kayla McKinney Wiggins, Modern Verse Drama in English: An Annotated Bibliography (1993). A detailed list of over 500 verse dramas, organized by playwright, from 1935-1990. Wiggins expands the canon beyond the male English hegemony, providing a brief synopsis for each play she lists.
- Claire Hélie and Xavier Lemoine, eds., Verse Drama on the Anglophone Stage in the 20th-21st Centuries (2020). A collection of academic papers on contemporary Anglophone verse dramatists, from Yeats to Maxwell. The collection includes two French translations of English plays.

Educational Podcasts

- The Beyond Shakespeare Company, Host & Ed.: Robert Crighton (2014–present). Focused on Anglophone dramas between 1300-1642, excluding one notable playwright, Beyond Shakespeare hosts a podcast, YouTube channel, and live events.
- Hamlet to Hamilton: Exploring Verse Drama, Host: Emily C. A. Snyder, Ed.: Colin Kovarik (2020–present). Billed as an educational podcast for those interested in exploring how to write and perform verse drama. Even numbered seasons explore the history of Anglophone verse drama.

== See also ==
- Epic poetry
- Lyric poetry
- Narrative poetry
- Persona poetry
