= Samuel Marchbanks' Almanack =

- First edition
- Author: Robertson Davies
- Language: English
- Genre: Didactic fiction
- Publisher: McClelland and Stewart
- Publication date: 1967
- Publication place: Canada
- Preceded by: The Table Talk of Samuel Marchbanks

Samuel Marchbanks' Almanack is a book published by McClelland and Stewart in 1967. It is the third and last of the Samuel Marchbanks books by Canadian novelist and journalist Robertson Davies. It follows The Diary of Samuel Marchbanks and The Table Talk of Samuel Marchbanks.

== Background ==
Davies created the Samuel Marchbanks character whilst editor of the Peterborough Examiner newspaper in the small city of Peterborough, Ontario, northeast of Toronto. He wrote the first column under the Marchbanks pseudonym in 1944.

Davies first started work on Samuel Marchbanks' Almanack in 1953, but the manuscript was rejected by his publisher, Clarke Irwin. Davies filed the rejected manuscript away, not to return to it for a decade. He resubmitted it for publication in 1966, this time choosing McClelland and Stewart as the prospective publisher. The book is presented in the form of an almanac, based on the signs of the Zodiac.

== Reception ==
Jacqueline Hayes, writing in the Waterloo Region Record, compared the book to the previous Marchbanks books, found the work lacking. She thought that when it wasn't "so low-keyed as to be slumber-inducing", it was too "esoteric" in an uninteresting way. The Toronto Star's Robert Fulford found it strange how little seemed to have changed in Marchbanks' world since the original 40s books, giving the work a "a charm that is, at best, antique".
