= The Rebel Angels =

Novel by Robertson Davies

- First Edition
- Author: Robertson Davies
- Original title: The Rebel Angels
- Cover artist: Peter Paterson
- Language: English
- Series: The Cornish Trilogy
- Publisher: Macmillan of Canada
- Publication date: 1981
- Publication place: Canada
- Media type: Print (Hardback, Paperback)
- Pages: 326
- ISBN: 0-7715-9556-5
- OCLC: 7974142
- Dewey Decimal: 813/.54 19
- LC Class: PR9199.3.D3 R4 1981
- Followed by: What's Bred in the Bone

The Rebel Angels is novel by Canadian author Robertson Davies. First published by Macmillan of Canada in 1981, The Rebel Angels is the first of the three connected novels of Davies' Cornish Trilogy. It was followed by What's Bred in the Bone (1985), and The Lyre of Orpheus (1988).

Like the rest of the Cornish Trilogy, the novel takes place in the same universe as the Deptford Trilogy, with the major characters Clement Hollier and John Parlabane being alums of Colborne College (the college where Dunstan Ramsay taught history in Fifth Business) and former classmates of Boy Staunton's son David.

== Plot ==
The Rebel Angels follows several faculty and staff of the fictional College of St. John and Holy Ghost, affectionately referred to as "Spook". The story, like many of Davies', is notable for very strongly drawn and memorable characters:

- The defrocked monk Parlabane, a brilliant and sinister sodomite with a thundering voice and voracious appetite;
- Anglican priest and professor of New Testament Greek Simon Darcourt;
- Maria Theotoky, a graduate student researching Rabelais;
- Clement Hollier, a frazzled and absentminded professor; and
- Urquhart McVarish, a greedy and manipulative counterpoint to Hollier.

The novel's narration alternates between Theotoky's and Darcourt's points of view. Darcourt is attempting to write a history of the university based on Aubrey's Brief Lives.

Much of the story is set in motion by the death of eccentric art patron and collector Francis Cornish. Hollier, McVarish, and Darcourt are the executors of Cornish's complicated will, which includes material that Hollier wants for his studies. The deceased's nephew Arthur Cornish, who stands to inherit the fortune, is also a character.

== Background ==
Many of the characters (including Parlabane and McVarish) were based on college acquaintances of Davies; their stories are recounted in Judith Skelton Grant's biography Robertson Davies: Man of Myth (1994) and Brian Busby's Character Parts: Who's Really Who in CanLit (2003). As well, many believe that Davies based the College of St. John and the Holy Ghost (or "Spook" as it is affectionately called in the novel) on Toronto's Trinity College. Evidence for this connection includes numerous similarities between the fictional and the real life college (including architectural style, layout of rooms, age, and religious affiliation); the fact that Davies taught at Trinity College for twenty years and lived across the street from Trinity while master of Massey College; and perhaps most convincingly that a picture of Trinity's central tower is prominently featured on the cover of the novel's first edition. Equally plausible is the belief that Ploughwright College in the book is patterned after Davies's own Massey College. This connection is supported by the fact that much of the fortune donated by the Massey family to the University of Toronto for the founding of Massey College was originally made in the manufacture of farm equipment. Like the real-life Massey College, Ploughwright is a graduate college where scholars are invited to partake in interdisciplinary discussions and High Table dinners.

== Reception ==
Dave Langford reviewed The Rebel Angels for White Dwarf #45, and stated, "Not for the squeamish, it features a murder whose inventive nastiness makes the destruction of whole shiploads of the people in Downbelow Station pale into insignificance."

The book was published less than five years after an influx of Czech-Roma immigrants occurred in Canada. In a 1998 fact sheet about Roma in Canada, Ronald Lee wrote that in its wake, "media was carried away with the mythological, racist and stereotypical image of the Romani people created by Victorian writers, and perpetuated by such recent pundits of Canadian literature as the late Robertson Davies [in The Rebel Angels] where Roma were portrayed as magical, surrealistic, phantasmagoric, light-fingered, characters likely to pick the pockets of Canadians in general."
