= Thamesville =

Settlement in Chatham-Kent, Ontario, Canada

- Unincorporated community
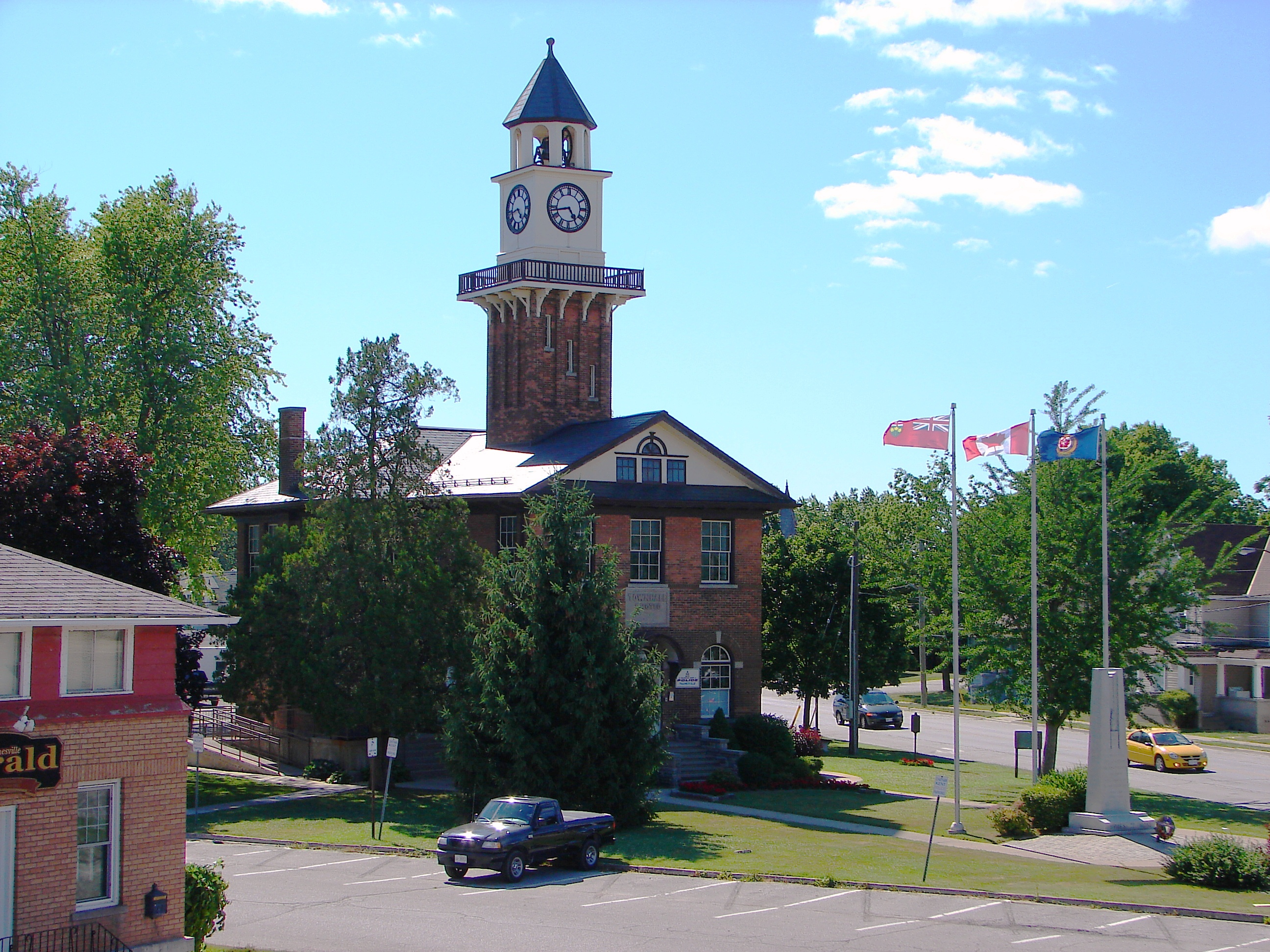
- Former Townhall

- Location of Thamesville in Chatham-Kent Thamesville (Southern Ontario)
- Coordinates: 42°33′6.282″N 81°58′37.704″W
- Country: Canada
- Province: Ontario
- Municipality: Chatham-Kent

Population (2021)
  - Total: 774
  - Density: 349.2/km^{2} (904/sq mi)
- Time zone: UTC-5 (EST)
  - Summer (DST): UTC-4 (EDT)
- Postal codes: 2K0
- Area code(s): 519, 226, 548

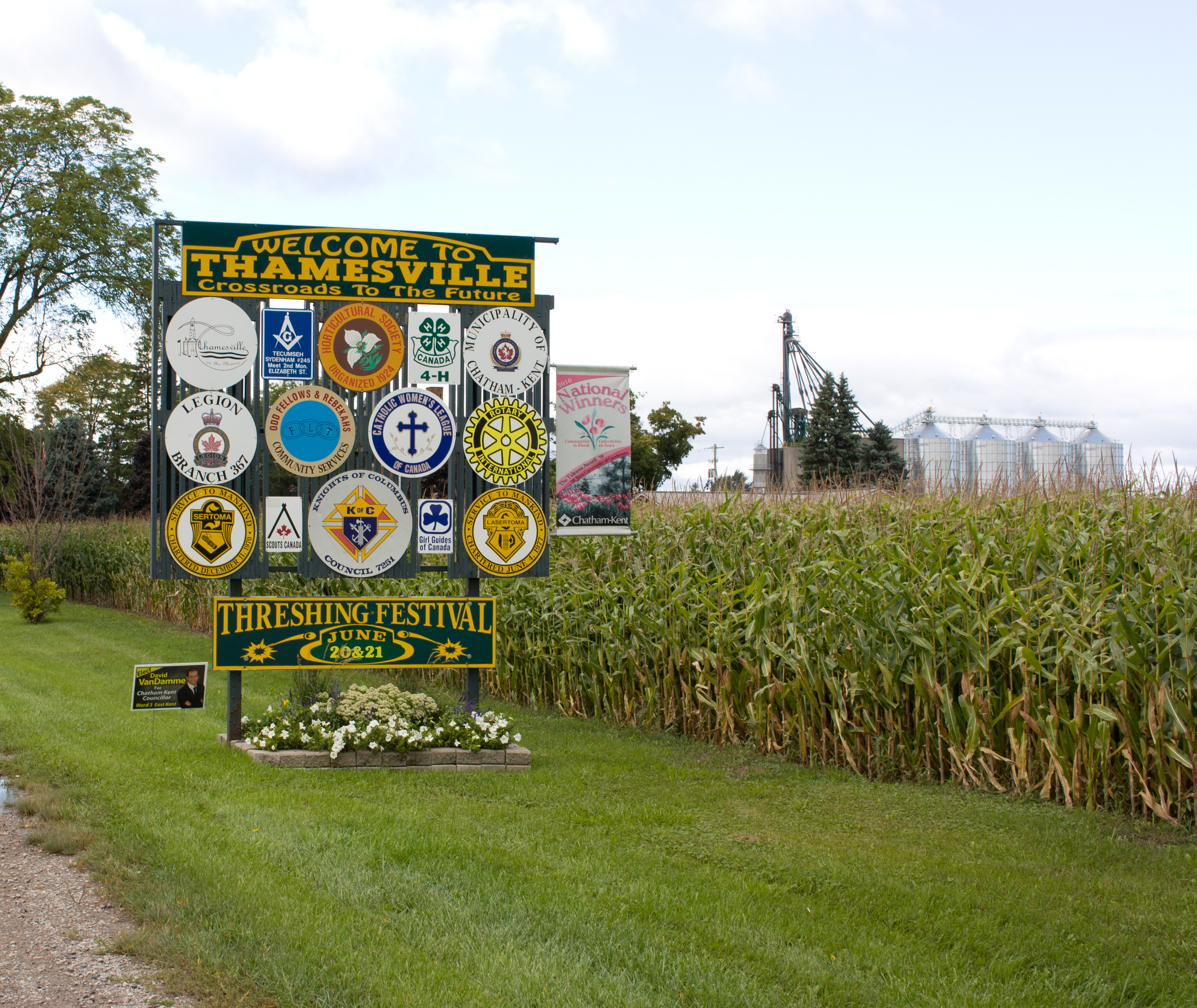
Thamesville welcome sign displaying various community organizations

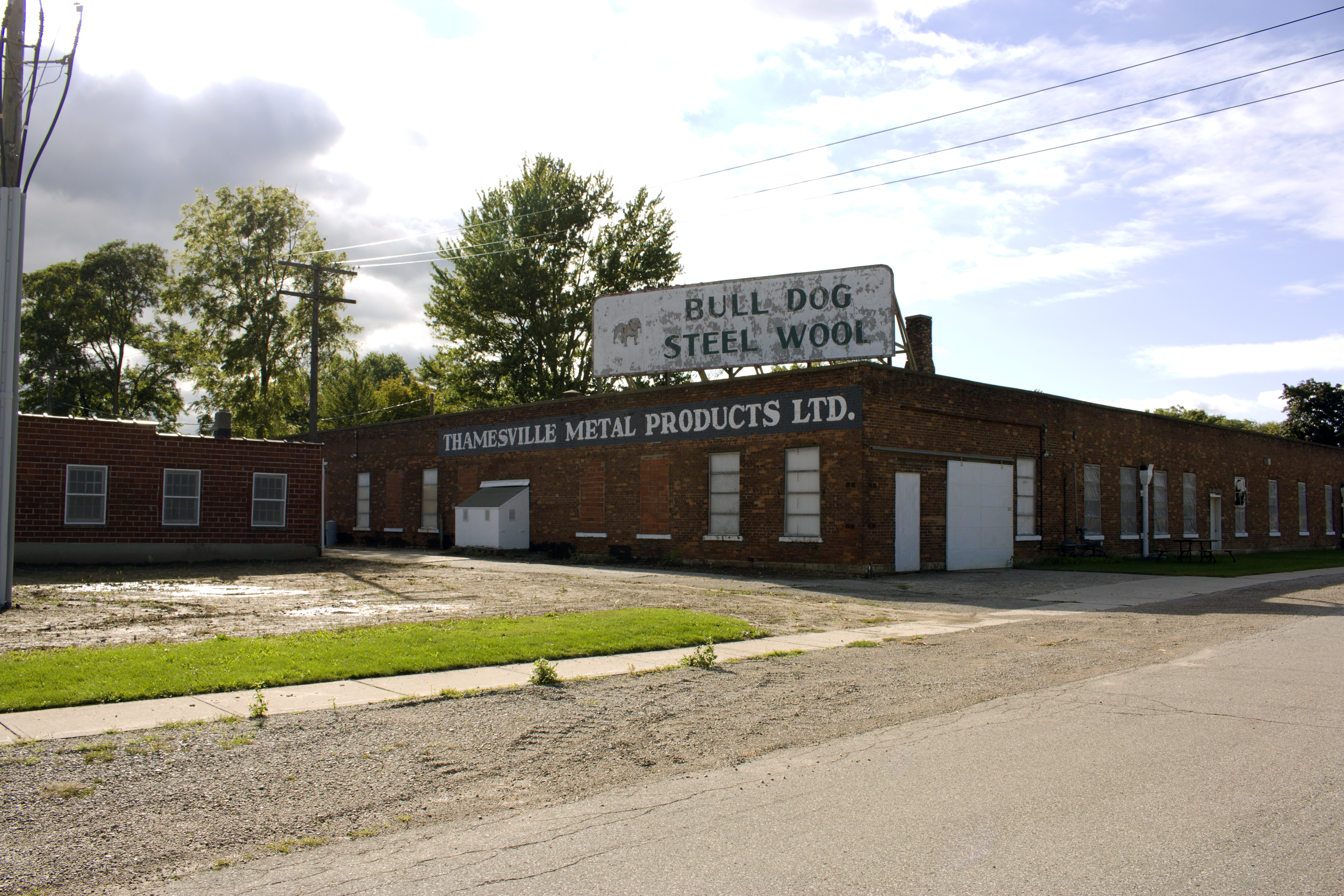
Bulldog Steel Wool factory - Thamesville

Thamesville is a community in Chatham-Kent, Ontario, Canada. It is located at the junction of former provincial Highways 2 and 21, between Chatham and London. Its name comes from the Thames River that flows nearby and the suffix "ville". Its post office was established in 1832.

It has a very small downtown with several restaurants and stores. Students get bussed to Dresden for Secondary Education, at Lambton-Kent Composite School or other local secondary schools such as Ursuline College Chatham, Chatham-Kent Composite School, and Ridgetown District High School. Thamesville has one Public Elementary School (Thamesville Area Central School) and one Catholic Elementary School (Good Shepherd Catholic School).

It is the home of the Threshing Festival, which is held annually in June. The Threshing Festival's main attraction is the midway and the parade held on the first night of the Festival. The festival sticks to its "rural roots" by featuring such events as lawnmower races, Farmer Olympics, and Frog Jumping contests.

The former town hall is now a public library and museum.

Near Thamesville is the site of a famous battle in the War of 1812. It is there that Shawnee leader Tecumseh was killed during the Battle of the Thames. In tribute to this war hero, a monument stands across from the field where the battle occurred.

Thamesville is also the birthplace of famous Canadian author Robertson Davies who wrote the Deptford Trilogy of novels (Fifth Business, The Manticore, and World of Wonders), in which Thamesville is fictionalized as the town of Deptford, Ontario.

Bulldog Steel Wool is manufactured in Thamesville.

== Demographics ==
In the 2021 Census of Population conducted by Statistics Canada, Thamesville had a population of 774 living in 345 of its 364 total private dwellings, a change of −10.1% from its 2016 population of 861. With a land area of 2.22 km^{2} (0.86 sq mi), it had a population density of 348.6/km^{2} (903.0/sq mi) in 2021.

== Notable people ==
- Birthplace of author Robertson Davies

== See also ==
- List of unincorporated communities in Ontario
