= For Your Eye Alone =

2000 book by Robertson Davies

- First edition
- Author: Robertson Davies
- Language: English
- Publisher: McClelland and Stewart
- Publication date: 2000

For Your Eye Alone, published by McClelland and Stewart in 2000, is a collection of letters by Canadian novelist Robertson Davies.

Editor Judith Skelton Grant provides a selection of letters written by Davies from the period starting in 1976 until 1995, the year of Davies' death. The letters touch on various subjects in Davies' life, including the publication of The Cornish Trilogy (1981 – 1988), Murther and Walking Spirits (1991), The Cunning Man (1994), and Davies' next novel, which was never completed.

For Your Eye Alone is the first collection of Davies' letters; Discoveries was published by McClelland and Stewart in 2002.
