= Leaven of Malice =

1954 novel by Robertson Davies

First edition (publ. Clarke Irwin) Cover art by Clair Stewart

Leaven of Malice, published in 1954, is the second novel in The Salterton Trilogy by Canadian novelist Robertson Davies. The other two novels are Tempest-Tost (1951) and A Mixture of Frailties (1958). The series was also published in one volume as The Salterton Trilogy in 1986.

The trilogy revolves around the residents of the imaginary town of Salterton, Ontario.

Davies won the Stephen Leacock Award for Humour in 1955 for Leaven of Malice.

== Plot summary ==
The book starts out with a false, anonymous engagement notice between Pearl Veronica Vambrace and Solomon (Solly) Bridgetower published in the local newspaper, the Bellman. The wedding is to be held on November 31 at the local cathedral. The notice creates a stir in the community. Professor Vambrace, the father of Pearl, is outraged, considering it an insult directed at himself and his family, due to his longtime feud with the Bridgetower family. He threatens the Bellman's editor, Gloster Ridley, to sue the Bellman for libel. Mrs. Bridgetower is also outraged, although she confines this to her personal circle. Matters are not helped by the fact that Solly, while having once invited Pearl to a ball, is still besotted with Griselda Webster, a local beauty and heiress, who is definitely not interested in him (cf. Tempest-Tost).

Vambrace consults a lawyer, a relative of his wife, who suggests that he not go through with the case, and that the newspaper is as much a victim of the hoax as he is. The lawyer's partner, Snelgrove, however, says otherwise, and offers to take the case himself.

The case is looked into by both Snelgrove and Ridley's lawyer. Along with several major and minor characters in the novel, they pursue a quest for the person responsible for entering the false wedding notice, who is dubbed 'X'. The climactic scene takes place at the Bellman, where the principal characters gather and the identity of X is revealed.

After all the chaos, Solly proposes to Pearl, who accepts. The Bellman's editor, however, insists they deliver their engagement announcement to the paper in person.

The novel explores themes of innocence, guilt, and judgement.
