= The Diary of Samuel Marchbanks =

Dustjacket of the edition, published in 1947, featuring illustrations by Clair Stewart

The Diary of Samuel Marchbanks, published by Clarke, Irwin in 1947, is the first of the Samuel Marchbanks books by Canadian novelist and journalist Robertson Davies. The other two books in this series are The Table Talk of Samuel Marchbanks (1949) and Samuel Marchbanks' Almanack (1967).

Davies created the Samuel Marchbanks character while editor of the Peterborough Examiner newspaper in the small city of Peterborough, Ontario, northeast of Toronto. He wrote the first column under the Marchbanks pseudonym in 1944.

The Diary of Samuel Marchbanks presents a year's worth of Marchbanks' columns in a diary format. For this book Davies chose the best columns from 1945 and 1946 and added a few new pieces.

Davies' writings as Samuel Marchbanks were also collected in a one-volume edition, The Papers of Samuel Marchbanks in 1985.
