= Samuel Marchbanks =

Fictional character

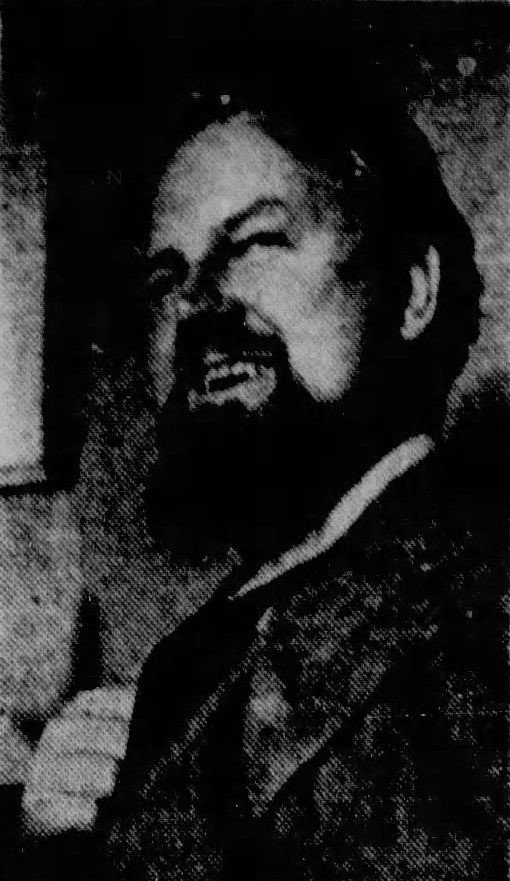
Robertson Davies, in 1952

Samuel Marchbanks is a fictional character who wrote editorials for the Peterborough Examiner newspaper in the small city of Peterborough, Ontario, northeast of Toronto, during the middle of the 20th century.

Marchbanks was, in fact, a pseudonym used by Canadian novelist, playwright, critic, journalist, and professor Robertson Davies during his tenure as editor of the newspaper. Marchbanks is described as witty, cantankerous, and determinedly individualistic.

Three books of Marchbanks' writings have been published, supposedly with Davies as editor. The metafictional pretence of there being two separate individuals spills over into the footnotes, where disagreements between Marchbanks and Davies are evident.

The Marchbanks books include The Diary of Samuel Marchbanks (published in 1947), The Table Talk of Samuel Marchbanks (published in 1949), and Samuel Marchbanks' Almanack (published in 1967). In 1985 an omnibus of the three previous Marchbanks books, The Papers of Samuel Marchbanks, was published with new notes by the author, or more correctly, by the editor (Davies).
