= Samuel Brandon =

Samuel Brandon may refer to:

- Samuel Brandon (author), 16th-century English writer
- Sam Brandon (born 1979), American football player
- S. G. F. Brandon (Samuel George Frederick Brandon, 1907–1971), British comparative theologian
