= The Deptford Trilogy =

Series of novels by Robertson Davies

The Deptford Trilogy (published 1970 to 1975) is a series of inter-related novels by the Canadian novelist Robertson Davies.

== Overview ==
The trilogy consists of Fifth Business (1970), The Manticore (1972), and World of Wonders (1975). The series revolves around a precipitating event: a young boy throws a snowball at another, hitting a pregnant woman instead, who goes into premature labor. It explores the longterm effects of these events on numerous characters.

The Deptford trilogy has won praise for its narrative voice and its characterizations. The main characters originate from the same small village. Each carries a secret that crosses the lives of the others and drives the plot forward. Fifth Business is considered one of Davies' best novels. The second novel, The Manticore, won the Governor-General's Literary Award in the English-language fiction category in 1972.

The trilogy was named for its setting in the fictional village of Deptford, Ontario. This is based in part on Davies' native Thamesville. Davies takes the view of different characters in each novel, and expresses each in a different style. The tone and unconventional literary devices of metafiction have led some later critics to suggest the series was a precursor to what has been called "slipstream" fiction in the 21st century.

== Fifth Business ==
Fifth Business is narrated by Dunstable (later Dunstan) Ramsay, who grows up in Deptford, a fictional town in southwestern Ontario, Canada. After World War I, he becomes a teacher and serves for decades at a college. The epistolary novel takes the form of a letter Ramsay writes to the headmaster of Colborne College after his retirement. He feels ill used by an article about him in the school paper. He recalls how, as a boy, he ducked a snowball intended for him. It hit a pregnant woman instead, and she gave birth prematurely. This incident and related events deeply affected Ramsay's life. He tells how he came to terms with his guilt. He also tells of his boyhood friend and enemy, Percy Boyd "Boy" Staunton, who becomes a wealthy businessman and politician.

== The Manticore ==
The Manticore is the story of Boy Staunton's only son, David, who undergoes Jungian psychoanalysis in Switzerland. During his therapy, he tries to understand his father and his relationship to him. The novel is a detailed record of his therapy and his coming to understand his own life. It sheds new light on many of the characters introduced in Fifth Business, including his father's friend Dunstan Ramsay, who happens to be in Switzerland recuperating from a heart attack.

The Manticore won the Governor-General's Literary Award in the English-language fiction category in 1972.

== World of Wonders ==
World of Wonders tells of Paul Dempster, a boy born prematurely who is befriended by Dunstan Ramsay. He learns to conjure and, as an adult, takes the name of Magnus Eisengrim as he establishes a successful career as a noted magician. Eisengrim is to portray Jean Eugène Robert-Houdin in a television movie. During lulls in the filming, he recounts his life, including obstacles he has overcome. He elaborates on his career as an actor traveling through Canada in the early 20th century. Dunstan Ramsay also appears in this novel. More insight is provided into the characters of Fifth Business.

== Key characters ==
=== Dunstan Ramsay ===
Dunstan Ramsay is the narrator of both Fifth Business and World of Wonders (he is not the protagonist in the last novel). He also appears as a major character in The Manticore and as a supporting character in several other novels by Davies. Ramsay is a gentle schoolmaster with surprising depths and is probably a stand-in for Davies himself. (Since Davies has said that the main business of a writer is to be an enchanter, a weaver of spells, a magician, Dempster/Eisengrim may stand for Davies.) Ramsay counsels his students to write in "the plain style," as Davies does—to highlight the story rather than the writer.

Ramsay appears in Davies' novels What's Bred in the Bone and The Lyre of Orpheus, two of his Cornish trilogy, and in the later novel The Cunning Man. Ramsay is not religious but he is fascinated by the lives of the saints. He writes several well-regarded treatises on saints. In the novels he is compared with Saint Dunstan in his struggle with Satan.

=== Magnus Eisengrim ===
Like several of the main characters in Davies' novels, Paul Dempster undergoes a series of symbolic rebirths, each of which is accompanied by a name change. Magnus Eisengrim is the final name taken on by Paul Dempster in the course of story told in the Deptford trilogy. The name is derived from 'Isengrin', a wolf in the stories of Reynard the Fox.

In "World of Wonders", the final book of the Deptford trilogy, Magnus Eisengrim, now a world famous stage magician, relates his life story to several friends and colleagues as they work to complete a film about the life of the renowned 19th century theatrical magician Robert-Houdin.

As related by Eisengrim: On December 28, 1908, Paul Dempster was born prematurely after his pregnant mother was hit in the head by a snowball thrown by Percy Boyd Staunton. As a result (it is assumed) of the mishap, she went insane.

Paul is raised by his strict and religious father, but at age 10 Paul visits the traveling 'World of Wonders' circus, where he is raped by Willard the Wizard, a performing sleight-of-hand magician with the troupe. To protect Willard, the troupe abducts and renames Paul. Traveling with the troupe under the assumed identity of Cass Fletcher, Paul endures a long period of continued psychological and physical abuse by Willard, but he also manages to learn the rudimentary skills of pick-pocketing, sleight of hand, and watch-repair. After eight hellish years, Paul escapes the World of Wonders and travels to France where, under a new assumed name, Faustus LeGrande, he becomes a traveling magician. Eventually, Willard dies. Although penniless, uneducated, and psychologically wounded, Paul, finally rid of his sodomizing tormentor, is at last able to begin shaping his own life in whatever way he wishes.

After several years later, Paul makes his way to England, where, by a stroke of great luck, he becomes the stunt double for Sir John Tresize, a famous, aging English actor. As time goes by Paul (under the new assumed name, "Fetch") begins to adopt Sir John's personality and appearance until he has almost completely taken on Sir John's persona.
