= The Well-Tempered Critic (Davies book) =

Book by Robertson Davies

The Well-Tempered Critic: One man's view of the theatre and letters in Canada
- First edition
- Editor: Judith Skelton Grant
- Author: Robertson Davies
- Language: English
- Genre: Essay collection
- Publisher: McClelland and Stewart
- Publication date: 1981
- Publication place: Canada
- ISBN: 0-7710-2567-X

The Well-Tempered Critic: One man's view of the theatre and letters in Canada is a collection of essays by Canadian novelist and journalist Robertson Davies. The collection was edited by Judith Skelton Grant and published by McClelland and Stewart in 1981.

The collection deals with Canadian literature and theatre.
