= Happy Alchemy =

Collection of writings by Canadian novelist Robertson Davies first publishes in 1997

- Author: Robertson Davies
- Language: English
- Publisher: McClelland and Stewart
- Publication date: 1997

Happy Alchemy, first published by McClelland and Stewart in 1997, is a collection of writings by Canadian novelist Robertson Davies. The collection was edited after Davies' death in 1995 by his literary executors: his wife Brenda and daughter Jennifer.

Happy Alchemy consists of various of Davies' unpublished speeches, book reviews and essays. It touches on themes, subjects and interests that were near to Davies' heart: in particular, theatre, opera and music.

== The book ==
The book opens with a quotation from the English poet Matthew Green:
"By happy alchemy of mind
They turn to pleasure all they find."

== Companion volume ==
Happy Alchemy was preceded in 1996 by a companion volume, The Merry Heart.
