= Brenda Davies =

Australian actress and stage manager (1917–2013)

Brenda Ethel Davies (née Mathews; January 17, 1917 – January 9, 2013) was an Australian actress and stage manager. She was the wife and literary executor of Canadian novelist Robertson Davies.

Mathews was born in Melbourne, and met Davies at the University of Oxford. Sharing an interest in theatre, they became engaged at the Old Vic in 1939 and married in 1940. Returning to Canada, they settled in Peterborough, Ontario, and had three daughters. Brenda gave up her career in the theatre.

Her influence on Davies extended to persuading him to begin writing novels after some success as a playwright and to become principal of Massey College.

After Davies' death in 1995, she and one of their daughters, Jennifer Surridge, became literary executors for his estate, and formed the company Pendragon Ink for this purpose. Together they edited one volume of Davies' criticism.

She was the sister of Maisie Purves Smith, who became the second wife of the painter Sir Russell Drysdale.

== Bibliography ==
- Davies, Robertson, Happy Alchemy (1997) (edited by Jennifer Surridge and Brenda Davies)
