= Tempest-Tost =

1951 novel by Robertson Davies

- First edition
- Author: Robertson Davies
- Language: English
- Publisher: Clarke Irwin
- Publication date: 1951

Tempest-Tost, published in 1951 by Clarke Irwin, is the first novel in The Salterton Trilogy by Canadian novelist Robertson Davies. The other two novels are Leaven of Malice (1954) and A Mixture of Frailties (1958). The series was also published in one volume as The Salterton Trilogy in 1986.

The trilogy revolves around the residents of the imaginary town of Salterton, Ontario.

== Plot summary ==
Tempest-Tost could be considered theatre-fiction, which, as Graham Wolfe explains, refers to "novels and stories that engage in concrete and sustained ways with theatre as artistic practice and industry". In the novel, an amateur theatrical group sets about mounting a production of Shakespeare's The Tempest. Romantic young scholar and assistant director Solomon ("Solly") Bridgetower, womanizer Roger Tasset and repressed middle-aged math teacher Hector Mackilwraith vie for the rich, beautiful and indifferent leading lady Griselda Webster. As the production moves forward, each man presses his suit with characteristic blind-spots as small rivalries and ambitions are pursued by Griselda's precocious sister Fredegonde (Freddy), the vain Professor Walter Vambrace, his socially awkward daughter Pearl Vambrace, and the mischievous musician Humphrey Cobbler.
