= The Table Talk of Samuel Marchbanks =

First edition

The Table Talk of Samuel Marchbanks is a book by Canadian novelist and journalist Robertson Davies, published by Clarke Irwin in 1949. It is the second of the Samuel Marchbanks books following the 1947 The Diary of Samuel Marchbanks.

== History ==
Davies created the Samuel Marchbanks character while he was the editor of the Peterborough Examiner newspaper in the city of Peterborough, Ontario.

The Table Talk of Samuel Marchbanks presents a number of Marchbanks' columns from 1947 and 1948, presenting them as observations purportedly made by Marchbanks during a seven-course formal dinner.

== Reception ==
The book was generally well received. Richard J. Needham, writing in Calgary Herald, found it a "thoroughly enjoyable book". W. J. Hurslow, in The Ottawa Citizen, called him a "Canadian Oliver Wendell Holmes", so well argued where the essays in his view. The Montreal Gazette's Roy Kervin called it a "rich, rollicking collection" of "garrulous wit". Both Needham and Hurslow thought it would make a good Christmas gift.
