= The Salterton Trilogy =

Novel series by Robertson Davies

First edition

The Salterton Trilogy consists of the first three novels by Canadian novelist Robertson Davies: Tempest-Tost (1951), Leaven of Malice (1954), and A Mixture of Frailties (1958). The series was also published in one volume as The Salterton Trilogy in 1986.

The trilogy revolves around the residents of the imaginary town of Salterton, Ontario. Salterton is a fictionalized Kingston, Ontario.

Davies was awarded the Stephen Leacock Award for Humour in 1955 for Leaven of Malice.
