= A Mixture of Frailties =

1958 novel by Robertson Davies

- First Canadian edition
- Author: Robertson Davies
- Language: English
- Series: The Salterton Trilogy
- Publisher: Macmillan Canada; Scribner (US); Weidenfeld & Nicolson (UK)
- Publication date: 1958
- Publication place: Canada
- Media type: Print (Hardcover)
- Pages: 379 pp
- Preceded by: Leaven of Malice

A Mixture of Frailties, published by Macmillan in 1958, is the third novel in The Salterton Trilogy by Canadian novelist Robertson Davies. The other two novels are Tempest-Tost (1951) and Leaven of Malice (1954). The series was also published in one volume as The Salterton Trilogy in 1986.

The trilogy revolves around the residents of the imaginary town of Salterton, Ontario which bears some resemblance to Kingston where Davies studied at Queen's University. Each book focuses on different protagonists but includes some characters from other books.

== Plot ==
The protagonist in Frailties, Monica Gall, is a working-class girl with a beautiful but immature singing voice. But the novel begins before she is introduced, somewhat after Leaven of Malice ends, with two of its protagonists, Pearl Veronica Vambrace and Solly Bridgetower now married but stuck in a difficult situation. When Solly's demanding mother Louisa Bridgetower dies, possessed of a much greater fortune than anyone except her lawyer knew about—over $1 million, more than $9 million today—she leaves instructions in her will to start a trust for the education in the arts of a young woman, in Europe, until such time as her son has a male child. The income from the rest all goes to the student. Until and unless the boy is born, Solly can't touch the money; his only unencumbered inheritance is a measly $100 (and he and Veronica must live in and keep up his late mother's house). This is Solly's mother's revenge on him and his wife for marrying against her wishes, an event that arises directly out of Leaven of Malice.

Monica becomes the beneficiary of the Bridgetower Trust, and goes to England to study with several teachers chosen for her by Sir Benedict Domdaniel, a theatrical knight who works as a conductor. Her experiences form the bulk of the novel. Meanwhile, back in Salterton, Solly deals with maintaining the Bridgetower estate on limited funds, and attempts more and more desperately to have a child with Veronica, so he will come into his conditional inheritance.

Monica is the daughter of a difficult mother also. Her family are Christian fundamentalists who exploit her talent by proselytizing on a local radio music show for which she is the best singer, but deprecate Monica's talent.

Monica grows as an artist under the tutelage of several teachers, including the rakish Giles Revelstoke, a frustrated composer and underground newspaper publisher. Revelstoke's character is based, in much biographical detail by Davies, on composer Peter Warlock (Philip Arnold Heseltine), whose own family were friends of the author's in Wales. They eventually become lovers, with Monica supporting his aspirations. Monica's mother dies, and when she returns for the funeral she finds how little she can now relate to her family and hometown. Returning to England, Revelstoke writes a critically acclaimed opera but embarrasses himself when he attempts to stand in for the conductor. In a fit of anger he insults Monica who writes him a letter breaking things off. When she goes to visit him, she finds that he has committed suicide by turning on the gas as suffocating himself, while clutching her letter. Fearing for her reputation, Monica takes the letter and leaves. She later learns from the coroner's inquest that Revelstoke had still been alive when she found him. The metered gas had shut off after she left and he would have survived had he not aspirated on his vomit; Monica could have saved him if she had called for help, a decision which torments her.

Monica returns to Canada to find that Pearl has had a son and that the trust will be dissolved, which makes Monica happy. At loose ends, she receives a letter from the much older Sir Domdaniel, proposing marriage. The book ends with her cabling him with her answer, but the reader is not told her decision.

== Reception ==
The book was released to positive reviews, with Edmund Fuller, reviewing for The New York Times, saying "(Davies) is lavish with character and laughter, wise and perceptive about life and art, capable of touching the sorrowful as well. In short, from Canada, a thoroughly rewarding writer with a fine new book."
