= Judith Skelton Grant =

Canadian writer, editor and biographer (born 1941)

Judith Skelton Grant (born 1941) is a Canadian writer, editor and biographer.

== Life ==
Grant has written about Leonard Cohen but she is better known for her editing of collections by novelist, playwright, critic, journalist, and professor Robertson Davies, as well as her biography of Davies, Robertson Davies: Man of Myth. She most recently wrote "A Meeting of Minds: The Massey College Story", a history of the college where Davies served as the first Master.

== Selected bibliography ==
=== As author ===
- The Nature of Duty and the Problem of Passion in the Works of George Eliot — 1974
- Mavis Gallant and Her Works — 1989. ISBN 978-1-5502-2033-9
- Robertson Davies: Man of Myth, Viking, Toronto, 1994. ISBN 0-670-82557-3 (hard cover); ISBN 0-14-011452-1 (paperback)
- A Meeting of Minds: The Massey College Story, University of Toronto Press, Toronto, 2015. ISBN 978-1-4426-5020-6

=== As editor ===
- The Enthusiasms of Robertson Davies — 1979; revised 1990. ISBN 978-0-6708-2994-1
- The Well-Tempered Critic: One man's view of theatre and letters in Canada — 1981. ISBN 978-0-7710-2567-9
- For Your Eye Alone: Letters 1976-1995 — 1999. ISBN 978-0-6708-9291-4
- Discoveries: Early letters 1938-1975 — 2002. ISBN 978-0-7710-3540-1
