= What's Bred in the Bone =

Novel by Robertson Davies

- First edition
- Author: Robertson Davies
- Language: English
- Series: The Cornish Trilogy
- Genre: literary
- Publisher: Macmillan of Canada
- Publication date: 1985
- Publication place: Canada
- Media type: Print (Hardback, Paperback)
- Pages: 436
- ISBN: 0-7715-9684-7
- OCLC: 27129845
- Preceded by: The Rebel Angels
- Followed by: The Lyre of Orpheus

What's Bred in the Bone is the second novel in the Canadian writer Robertson Davies' Cornish Trilogy. It is the life story of Francis or Frank Cornish, whose death and will were the starting point for the first novel, The Rebel Angels.

== Plot ==
After a brief framing scene among characters from The Rebel Angels, the novel turns to a conversation between the Recording Angel and the daimon in charge of Cornish's life. The main part of the book is that life as narrated by the Recording Angel, interspersed with comments in which the daimon explains how he worked to make Cornish a great man.

The account traces Cornish's family background through his two Canadian grandparents and examines his upbringing in a small town in Ontario. It describes his education in Toronto and at Oxford, his apprenticeship in art restoration and painting in Nazi Germany, and his experiences in England during the Second World War. The narrative also covers his postwar involvement with a group engaged in the recovery and preservation of artworks, as well as his activities as an art collector and patron in Toronto. Art forgery is a recurring subject in the account of his later life.

Cornish's daimon believes that people develop through adversity and provides Cornish with plenty, most obviously at the hands of his childhood classmates and his artistic master in Germany, but also in two love affairs and in a friendship with a young man who in some ways is Cornish's apprentice. Another form of adversity is Cornish's situation as a talented artist whose interests and skills are out of fashion.

First published by Macmillan of Canada in 1985, What's Bred in the Bone was on the shortlist for the 1986 Booker Prize.

What's Bred in the Bone is the second novel of the Cornish Trilogy. It was followed by The Lyre of Orpheus. It is also connected to earlier novels; when Cornish is at school in Toronto, one of his teachers is Dunstan Ramsay from the Deptford Trilogy. There are many parallels to be found in W. Somerset Maugham's Of Human Bondage.
