= A Voice from the Attic =

1960 essay collection by Robertson Davies

- First edition
- Author: Robertson Davies
- Language: English
- Subject: Literature
- Published: 1960
- Publisher: Knopf
- Publication place: United States
- Pages: 360
- OCLC: 1050679336

A Voice from the Attic is a collection of Robertson Davies' essays about reading aimed at intelligent and thoughtful readers, whom he calls the "clerisy". The title is a quote from Patrick Anderson and has a particular contemporary resonance in Davies' native Canada. Shannon King described this as a deprecatory phrase indicating "a quaint rummage bin of colonial past".

== Editions ==
A Voice from the Attic was initially published by the Canadian publisher McClelland and Stewart in 1960 with an accompanying edition published by Alfred A. Knopf in the United States. It has since been republished several times: Viking Press (1972), Rosetta Books (2019).

In the foreword to the 1990s edition, Davies wrote that while the essays were thirty-five to forty years old, they remained highly relevant. They run from musings on whether or not speed of reading and quality of reading are necessarily coincident, or even congruent, to essays on the nature of the popular book, to essays on the difference between the clerisy and the critic.
