= The Cornish Trilogy =

Three related novels by Robertson Davies

The Cornish Trilogy is three related novels by Canadian novelist, playwright, critic, journalist, and professor Robertson Davies.

The trilogy consists of The Rebel Angels (1981), What's Bred in the Bone (1985), and The Lyre of Orpheus (1988). The series explores the life and influence of Francis Cornish. In each novel, Davies looks at how underlying medieval patterns surface in modern lives. It takes place in the same universe as the Deptford Trilogy, with several characters from that trilogy either appearing or being mentioned. The Cornish Trilogy was abridged, dramatised and broadcast in 3 one-hour parts by the BBC in January 2001. The reduction in content to fit the time resulted in omission of numerous elements critical to the full complexity of the narrative as written.

== The Rebel Angels ==
The story of The Rebel Angels is set in motion by the death of eccentric art patron and collector Francis Cornish. University professors Clement Hollier, Urquhart McVarish, and Simon Darcourt are the executors of Cornish's complicated will, which includes material that Hollier wants for his scholarly work in Medieval Studies. The deceased's nephew Arthur Cornish, who stands to inherit the fortune, is also a character. All three executors (and Arthur) are intrigued by Maria Theotoky, Hollier's half-Hungarian, half-Gypsy graduate student, while the plot revolves around John Parlabane: ex-monk, skeptic philosopher, famulus, and general mischief-maker. The intuitive theme in this novel is the Tarot. The novel was abridged and dramatised for radio by the BBC in 2001 with the title The Death Card.

== What's Bred in the Bone ==
What's Bred in the Bone is the life story of Francis Cornish, whose death and will were the subject of The Rebel Angels. His was a full life, and we follow him through his childhood as a wealthy and precocious misfit in a small Ontario town, his education in Toronto (in which we meet Dunstan Ramsay from the Deptford Trilogy) and Oxford, his unusual apprenticeship as a restorer and painter in Nazi Germany, his wartime experiences in England, and his later career as a collector and a patron of the arts in Toronto. Cornish's life story develops as related by Cornish's daemon, a Mercurial influence who intervenes at crucial moments to ensure that Cornish becomes a great man, although that may be seen only after his death. Intuition in this novel is expressed through astrology. The novel was abridged and dramatised for radio by the BBC in 2001 with the title The Knave of Coins.

What's Bred in the Bone was shortlisted for the 1986 Booker Prize.

== The Lyre of Orpheus ==
In the third novel, Simon Darcourt, Arthur Cornish, and Maria Cornish find themselves at the head of the "Cornish Foundation" and are called upon to decide what projects deserve funding. Their first assay into the world of humanist patronage is to support a precocious composer in completing an unfinished opera by E.T.A. Hoffmann entitled Arthur of Britain, or the Magnanimous Cuckold, and then bringing it to the stage at Stratford, Ontario. The novel follows the course of this project from inception to completion. At the same time, the archetypes in the opera are reflected in the personal lives of those involved: Arthur and Maria as the central "ruling" couple, Arthur's best friend Geraint Powell, a Welsh actor-turned-director as Lancelot, Simon Darcourt as the household cleric and writer, and so on. In this final novel, archetypes tie together the three levels of Arthurian, Romantic, and modern characters. The novel was abridged and dramatised for radio by the BBC in 2001 with the title The Fool.
