= The Manticore =

Second novel in Robertson Davies' Deptford Trilogy

- First edition
- Author: Robertson Davies
- Language: English
- Series: The Deptford Trilogy
- Publisher: Macmillan Canada
- Publication date: 1972
- Publication place: Canada
- Media type: Print
- ISBN: 0-7705-0891-X
- Preceded by: Fifth Business
- Followed by: World of Wonders

The Manticore is the second novel in Robertson Davies' Deptford Trilogy.

Published in 1972 by Macmillan of Canada, it deals with the aftermath of the mysterious death of Percy Boyd "Boy" Staunton retold during a series of conversations between Staunton's son and a Jungian psychoanalyst.

The title refers to elements of the subconscious which unfold through the story and are eventually manifested as a fantastic mythical creature: a manticore.

The Manticore won the Governor-General's Literary Award in the English-language fiction category in 1972.

== Principal characters ==
- David Staunton – Son of the super-rich industrialist Boy Staunton, he is the narrator of the novel. After a psychotic episode in Toronto he seeks out the help of Jungian psychoanalysts in Zurich. He is a famous barrister, an alcoholic, and a keen patron of the arts, with a heightened sense of morality and a hero worship for his father mixed with filial defiance.
- Johanna Von Haller – David Staunton's Jungian analyst in Zurich. More clever than Staunton in debate, she guides him through the multiple phases of Jungian analysis, being the subject of his projections of the shadow, the friend, and the anima. She warns Staunton that theirs is only the first phase of analysis. She has helped him discover who he is. The next phase would help him discover what he is (an allusion to the quest to discover the collective unconscious in oneself).
- Dunstan Ramsay – The narrator of the novel Fifth Business. Born at the turn of the twentieth century he is maimed in World War I, wins a Victoria Cross, and devotes his life to the study of saints and myth. He watched over David Staunton during his youth while his father was absent. David is fixated on him, believing him to possibly be his father through an alleged affair with his mother.
- Boy Staunton – David Staunton's father. Through his immense business skills he becomes fabulously wealthy in the sugar processing business in Canada. He has almost no insight into himself, but is a charming man with an immense need for sexual gratification. David Staunton idealizes his father at the start of the novel, and his narrative can be seen as an extended effort to know who his father really was.
- Leola Staunton – David Staunton's mother and the ravishing wife of Boy Staunton and first love of Dunstan Ramsay. A sometimes weak, sometimes strong woman who cannot live up to her ambitious husband's expectations.
- Liselotte (Liesl) Naegeli – Daughter of a millionaire Swiss watchmaker who assists Magnus Eisengrim in his travelling magic show. She is bisexual, and the victim of an early adolescent affliction (never specified but possibly acromegaly) which leaves her unusually tall and with large features. After David's analysis, she tries to shock him into understanding the nature of the collective unconscious.
- Magnus Eisengrim – Master magician and illusionist, he is a permanent guest at the Swiss mountain retreat of Liselotte Naegeli and much despised initially by David Staunton for his presumed role in his father's death. During an extended Christmas holiday at the Naegeli mansion, Staunton comes to a grudging acceptance and perhaps even admiration of Eisengrim. His ability to accept Eisengrim symbolizes the last step in Staunton's evolution towards a "whole" human who can take or leave others without upset.
