= Murther and Walking Spirits =

1991 novel by Robertson Davies

- First UK edition (publ. Sinclair Stevenson)
- Author: Robertson Davies
- Publisher: McClelland and Stewart
- Publication date: 1991
- ISBN: 978-0-771-02566-2

Murther and Walking Spirits, first published by McClelland and Stewart in 1991, is a novel by Canadian novelist Robertson Davies.

Unlike Davies' previous novels, Murther and Walking Spirits was not part of a trilogy. There is some supposition, however, that had Davies lived long enough this novel and his next novel, The Cunning Man, might have constituted another trilogy. In fact, in his introduction to The Merry Heart (1996), a collection of Davies' writings published posthumously, Davies' publisher, Douglas M. Gibson, tells how Davies had been researching and preparing the novel which would have followed The Cunning Man and would have been the third in the series. Gibson speculated that this unfinished trilogy might have been called the "Toronto Trilogy".

Davies used his own ancestry — Welsh and United Empire Loyalist — as inspiration for the "films" presented.

The novel is prefaced with a quote from Samuel Butler: "But where Murthers and Walking Spirits meet, there is no other Narrative can come near it." (The word "murther" is an archaic spelling of "murder".)

== Plot ==
Murther and Walking Spirits is, in a way, another ghost story, a genre Davies visited in his short story collection High Spirits (1982). In the very first sentence of the novel, "Gil" Gilmartin, the protagonist and narrator, is a film critic who comes home to find his attractive wife having an affair with a nerdy coworker, who strikes him with a walking stick in fear, causing his death. His ghost then attends a strange film festival. While the attendees see actual films, Gilmartin is shown "films" detailing the lives of his ancestors, such as one who was a Tory during the American Revolution or another who was a master carpenter who married a blue-blooded woman, only to have it end in a nasty divorce. The films, dealing as they do with more and more recent subjects, bring the novel to its modern-day conclusion. Gilmartin's ghost is able to cross over when his killer confesses to the newspaper editor, who chides him for the sin, but also for society in general: "It's a hot dinner for the wrongdoer and the victims struggle". Rather than surrender the killer to the authorities, the editor says his punishment should be to carry that walking stick for the rest of his life, akin to a "mark of Cain". Gilmartin also learns that prior to his death, he had impregnated his wife, and his ancestors' tribulations may have been shown to him as a sign the bloodline will continue. The final scene is where Gilmartin finds himself in the sky, being addressed by a feminine voice. Thinking it at first to be his deceased mother, she says she is not, but "the woman in the man", thinking of a remark one of his newspaper coworkers made.

== Reception ==
Murther and Walking Spirits was not well received by critics, and sales of the book were disappointing compared to Davies' previous works.
