= The Cunning Man =

1994 novel by Robertson Davies

- First edition
- Author: Robertson Davies
- Publisher: McClelland and Stewart
- Publication date: 1994
- Media type: Print
- Pages: 469
- ISBN: 0-7710-2581-5

The Cunning Man, published by McClelland and Stewart in 1994, is the last novel written by Canadian novelist Robertson Davies.

The Cunning Man is the memoir of the life of a doctor, Dr. Jonathan Hullah, living in Toronto. Hullah is a holistic physician — a cunning diagnostician who can often get to the root of problems that have baffled others. A young journalist's query about the circumstances surrounding an Anglican priest's death at the high altar on Good Friday leads Hullah to reflect on his own life and career.

As is typical in Davies' work, the novel's themes are wide-ranging: miraculous cures, halitosis, cannibalism, medical solutions to literary mysteries, and more.

Dunstan Ramsay, the narrator of Fifth Business and a major character in Davies' Deptford Trilogy, makes a brief appearance here.

A fictionalised version of Toronto's Church of St. Mary Magdalene features prominently.

Unlike most of Davies' previous novels, The Cunning Man was not part of a trilogy. However, there is some speculation that, had Davies lived long enough, this novel and his previous one, Murther and Walking Spirits (1991), would have been the first two volumes in another trilogy. For example, "Gil" Gilmartin, the narrator of Murther and Walking Spirits, reappears in The Cunning Man as Hullah's godson. In fact, in his introduction to The Merry Heart (1996), a collection of Davies' writings published posthumously, Davies' publisher, Douglas Gibson, tells how Davies had been researching and preparing the novel which would have followed The Cunning Man and would have been the third in the series. Gibson speculates that this unfinished trilogy might have been called the "Toronto Trilogy".

== See also ==
- Cunning folk
