= The Lyre of Orpheus (novel) =

1988 novel by Robertson Davies

- First edition cover
- Author: Robertson Davies
- Series: The Cornish Trilogy
- Publisher: Viking Penguin
- Publication date: January 1, 1988
- ISBN: 978-0-670-82416-8
- Preceded by: What's Bred in the Bone

The Lyre of Orpheus is a 1988 novel by Canadian author Robertson Davies, first published by Macmillan of Canada. Lyre is the last of three connected novels of the Cornish Trilogy. It was preceded by The Rebel Angels (1981) and What's Bred in the Bone (1985).

== Plot ==
In The Lyre of Orpheus, the executors of the will of Francis Cornish (the subject of What's Bred in the Bone) find themselves at the head of the "Cornish Foundation". The directors of the Foundation, who are the three remaining Frank Cornish's estate executors, being Professor the Reverend Simon Darcourt, Arthur Cornish, and Maria Cornish, plus Professor Clement Hollier and Stratford, Ontario actor Geraint Powell, are called upon to decide what projects deserve funding. They decide that an unfinished opera by E. T. A. Hoffmann will be finished and staged at Stratford; to this end, they hire a brilliant young composition student, Hulda Schnakenburg ("Schnak"), to complete the opera as her PhD. dissertation, while Darcourt is charged with the completion of the libretto, which James Planché had attempted to write.

The opera to be completed is King Arthur or the Magnanimous Cuckold. The storyline follows the writing and then production of the opera, and the plot parallels the legend of King Arthur, and in particular the triangle of King Arthur, his queen, Guenevere, and Lancelot. Geraint Powell, using deception, fathers a child by Maria Cornish, forcing Arthur Cornish to choose between a generous or vindictive response. The Lyre of Orpheus not only explores the world of early eighteenth century opera, but also follows Darcourt's research into the life of the benefactor and artist Francis Cornish. Darcourt discovers that a painting of The Wedding at Cana, previously attributed to an unknown sixteenth century painter known only as "The Alchemical Master", was in fact the work of Francis Cornish himself, as described in the second book of the trilogy, What's Bred in the Bone. A further plotline involves the sexual and artistic flowering of Hulda Schnakenburg under the hand of Gunilla Dahl-Soot, a distinguished Swedish musicologist who serves as Schnak's academic advisor and becomes her lover.

The book explores a number of themes, including the pursuit of life beyond the ordinary or comfortable routine, which is exemplified in the artistic quest to produce the opera and in Darcourt's quest to uncover the truth behind the painting of The Wedding at Cana. The theme of marriage is examined through the relationship between Arthur and Maria Cornish, a relationship tested by infidelity. And the modern approach to relationships is mocked in the dysfunctional common-law situation of two minor characters, Al and Mabel, who present themselves in Toronto to monitor and record the production of the opera from start to finish.

As often happens in Davies' novels, all is not simple; for example, the ghost of Hoffman, trapped in Limbo as a result of the unsatisfactory state of his artistic work, attends and comments on the proceedings. Nor is all peaceful among the characters, as they react to Powell's seduction of Maria Cornish, Dahl-Soot's seduction of Schnak, and the tensions created by the effort to mount an operatic production.
