= High Spirits (short story collection) =

1982 collection of short stories by Robertson Davies

- Author: Robertson Davies
- Language: English
- Genre: Fantasy, anthology
- Published: 1982
- Publisher: Penguin Canada
- Pages: 198
- ISBN: 9780140065053
- OCLC: 806312433

High Spirits is a collection of short stories by Canadian novelist, playwright, and journalist Robertson Davies, first published by Penguin Canada in 1982.

Davies was Master of Massey College at the University of Toronto in Toronto, Ontario from 1963 until 1981. Shortly after founding the College, he began to tell a ghost story at the College's annual Christmas party — its Gaudy Night — as an entertainment. The ghost story became a tradition, and for eighteen years Davies wrote a new story to read aloud at the Gaudy Night celebration.

After Davies' retirement from Massey College, the eighteen stories were collected and published as High Spirits.

== Contents ==
- "How the High Spirits Came About, A Chapter of Autobiography"
- "Revelation from a Smoky Fire"
- "The Ghost Who Vanished by Degrees"
- "The Great Queen is Amused"
- "The Night of the Three Kings"
- "The Charlottetown Banquet"
- "When Satan Comes Home for Christmas"
- "Refuge of Insulted Saints"
- "Dickens Digested"
- "The Kiss of Krushchev"
- "The Cat that Went to Trinity"
- "The Ugly Spectre of Sexism"
- "The Pit Whence Ye Are Digged"
- "The Perils of the Double Sign"
- "Conversations with the Little Table"
- "The King Enjoys His Own Again"
- "The Xerox in the Lost Room"
- "Einstein and the Little Lord"
- "Offer of Immortality"

== Reception ==
Dave Langford reviewed High Spirits for White Dwarf #52, and stated that "It's the best collection since M. R. James in this narrow genre of donnish, tongue-in-cheek ghost stories."

== Reviews ==
- Review by Douglas E. Winter (1984) in SF & Fantasy Review, March 1984
- Review by Rosemary Pardoe (1984) in Ghosts & Scholars #6, 1984
- Review [French] by Luc Pomerleau (1985) in Solaris, #59
