= World of Wonders (novel) =

1975 novel by Robertson Davies

- First edition
- Author: Robertson Davies
- Language: English
- Series: The Deptford Trilogy
- Genre: Theatre-fiction
- Published: 1975 (Macmillan Canada)
- Publication place: Canada
- Media type: Paperback
- Pages: 316
- ISBN: 9780670788125 (1975ed)
- Preceded by: The Manticore

World of Wonders is the third novel in Robertson Davies's Deptford Trilogy.

First published by Macmillan of Canada in 1975, this novel focuses on the life-story of the fictional conjuror Magnus Eisengrim.

== Plot ==
Magnus Eisengrim (also known by at least four other names throughout the trilogy) tells the story of his life to a group of filmmakers who are producing a biographical film about the great magician Jean Eugène Robert-Houdin for the BBC. They are headed by the world-famous Swedish director Jurgen Lind (evidently modeled on Ingmar Bergman). Also present during the story are Eisengrim's friends Dunstan Ramsay and Liesl, who both appear in the earlier installments of the Deptford Trilogy. Ramsay reprises the role of narrator which he played in the first novel, Fifth Business, but in this case it is only to add context and continuity to the internal narration of Eisengrim. The life story of Eisengrim pulls together many events found throughout the previous two novels, showing them from a different perspective.

== Section summary ==
=== A Bottle in the Smoke ===
This section deals with Paul's life travelling with Wanless World of Wonders carnival as well as playing in vaudeville theatres during the winters. The section title derives from the biblical reference to a bottle as a goatskin that has been cured and hardened by smoke from a fire. Paul has similarly been hardened by his experiences at the hands of Willard, the magician who abducts Paul and subjects him to sexual abuse.

=== Merlin's Laugh ===
In this section, Paul has arrived in London and is recruited as a stunt double to Sir John Tresize, actor-manager of a stage company. After playing stages in London and elsewhere in Britain, the troop does a long tour in Canada. Paul, who is called Mungo Fetch within the company, is strongly influenced by both Tresize and his wife, "Milady". In the telling, Magnus reveals that Ingestree as a young man had also joined Tresize's troop and had embarrassed himself in several ways. Magnus also shows how Ingestree later revenged himself on Tresize by a spiteful act.

=== Le Lit de Justice ===
In this epilogue section, Liesl, Magnus, and Dunstan share a large bed (lit) in the Savoy hotel in London after the completion of the film. Dunstan and Liesl question Magnus based on his earlier revelations, and the mystery of the death of Boy Staunton is finally resolved.

== Primary characters ==
- Magnus Eisengrim – As the main focus of the novel, much of the story revolves around Eisengrim telling his life story in order to explain his context for playing the character of Robert Houdin.
- Dunstan Ramsay – The narrator and good friend of both Eisengrim and Liesl.
- Liesl
- Jurgen Lind
- Roland Ingestree – Executive producer of the film for the BBC
- Kinghovn – Lind's cameraman

== Themes ==
The book contains an extended treatment of the paedophilic abuse inflicted on the young Eisengrim by his abductor who repeatedly sodomizes him and uses him to obtain morphine, but in turn teaches him hand magic.

In light of its recurring focus on theatre and performance, scholars such as Katrina Dunn have discussed World of Wonders as theatre-fiction.
