= Samuel Brandon (author) =

16th-century English writer

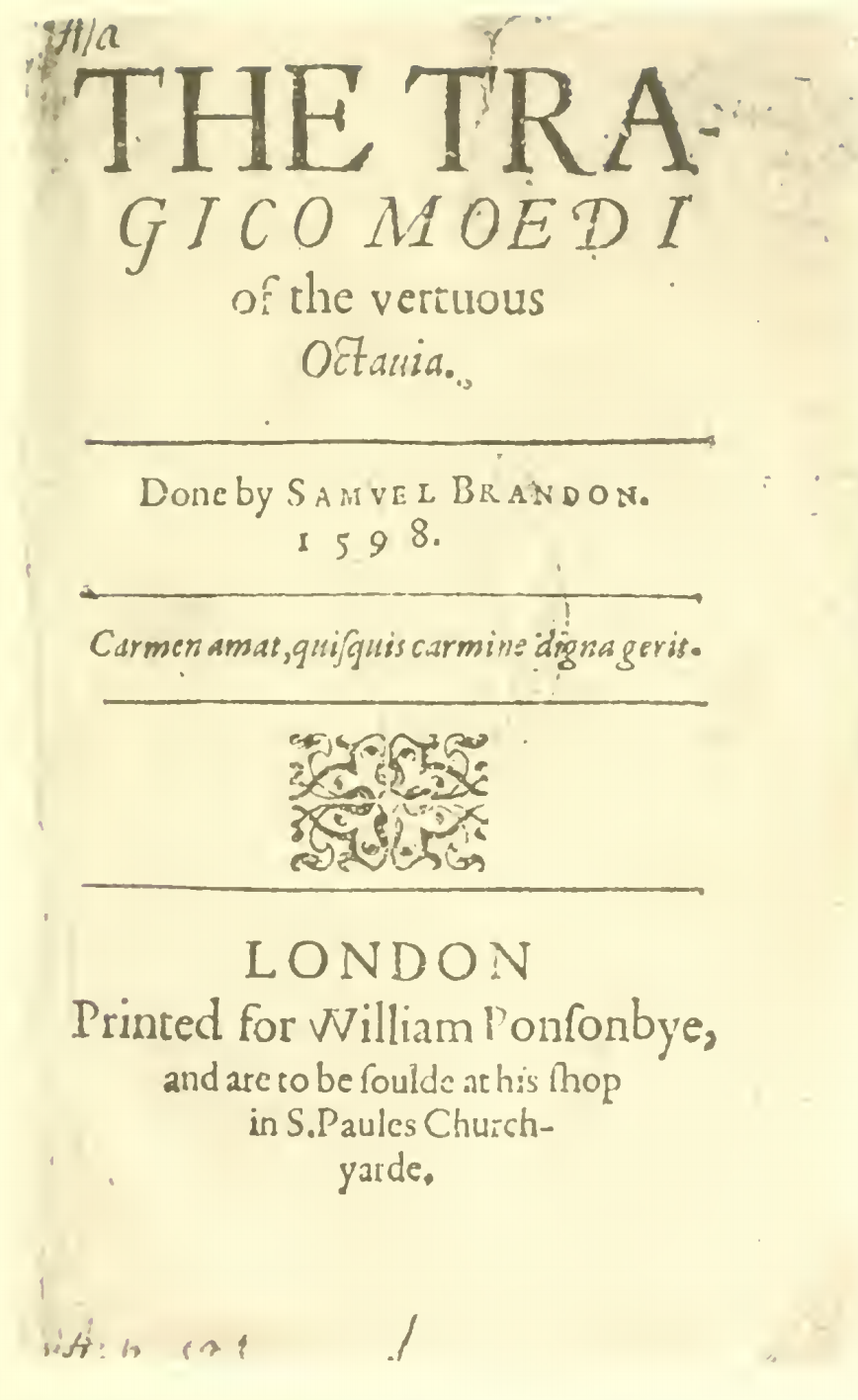
Title page of Virtuous Octavia

Samuel Brandon was a 16th-century English writer, author of one known play, The Virtuous Octavia, published in 1598.

== The Virtuous Octavia ==
Nothing is known of Brandon, except that he was the author of The Tragi-comœdi of the Virtuous Octavia. This, his one play, is described by John Joseph Knight in the first edition of The Dictionary of National Biography as "a work of some merit and of considerable value and rarity." There are no contemporary records of the play, except for its entry in the register of the Stationers' Company for 1598, and it was not reprinted until 1909.

The Virtuous Octavia is modelled on Samuel Daniel's Cleopatra. The plot, taken from the life of Augustus by Suetonius, and that of Mark Antony by Plutarch, follows to some extent classical models. It is set is Rome, and its catastrophe is the death of Mark Antony. The fact that at the close the heroine, who oscillates between love for her husband and jealousy of Cleopatra, is still alive, is the excuse for calling it a tragicomedy. Knight comments that though "weak in structure and deficient in interest, the Virtuous Octavia has claims to attention as poetry." It is written in decasyllabic verse with rhymes to alternate lines, with choruses at the end of each act. John Payne Collier, writing in 1831, noted Brandon's innovative use of compound epithets of a type derived from ancient Greek literature, such as "pearl-dropping showers", "sceptre-bearing hands" and "terror-breeding crown".

Two epistles between Octavia and Mark Antony, in an imitation of Ovid's style, but written in long Alexandrines are appended to the play. These epistles are dedicated "to the honourable, virtuous, and excellent Mrs. Mary Thin", while the play itself is dedicated to Lady Lucia Audelay. At the close of the work are the Italian words: "L'acqua non temo dell'eterno oblio", a phrase described in the play's entry in the Biographia Dramatica (1812) as "an instance among many of the vanity of authors, who flatter themselves into an imaginary immortality, which frequently terminates even before the close of their mortal existence, much less extends beyond it".

== Sources ==
- This article incorporates text from a publication now in the public domain: Knight, John Joseph (1885–1900). "Brandon, Samuel". Dictionary of National Biography. London: Smith, Elder & Co.
