= Fifth Business =

1970 novel by Robertson Davies

- First edition
- Author: Robertson Davies
- Language: English
- Series: The Deptford Trilogy
- Genre: Speculative fiction
- Publisher: Macmillan Canada
- Publication date: October 1970
- Publication place: Canada
- Media type: Print (Hardcover)
- Pages: 314
- ISBN: 978-0-141-18615-3
- OCLC: 36190121
- Followed by: The Manticore

Fifth Business is a novel by the Canadian writer Robertson Davies. Published by Macmillan of Canada in 1970, it is the first instalment of Davies' best-known work, the Deptford Trilogy, and explores the life of the narrator, Dunstan Ramsay. It was the novel that brought Davies to international attention.

Many literary theorists have found examples of archetypes based on the work of Swiss psychologist Carl Gustav Jung throughout Fifth Business.

== Development ==
Davies paused his literary career after the publication of his 1958 novel A Mixture of Frailties. In 1960, he became a professor of English at Trinity College. In 1963, he was appointed director of Massey College, a new school within the University of Toronto. Several literary scholars note a similarity between this time in Davies life and the career of Dunstan Ramsey in Fifth Business. During this break, Davies began to research how he could integrate Jung's theories in fiction.

Structurally, Fifth Business can be considered a Bildungsroman. Davies thought of it as "autobiographical, but not as young men do it; it will be rather as Dickens wrote David Copperfield, a fictional reworking of some things experienced and much re-arranged." Deptford is thought to stand-in for the town in which he was born, Thamesville. His own brother had an illness and miraculous recovery similar to Willie Ramsey. As Diane Cole wrote in the New York Times soon after the author's death, "Davies used his personal myths and archetypes to probe the possibilities of human good and evil, but always with a wickedly humorous wink." In Fifth Business, Davies provides an account of his spirit, his memories, and his deeper life experiences from childhood to adulthood.

Some of the elements of character Percy Boyd Staunton's life resemble that of Davies' friend Vincent Massey. Both men became rich from their father's agricultural businesses. Both men enlisted in World War I, went into politics afterward and held cabinet positions, and strengthened Canada's ties with Great Britain. Massey was appointed as the first Canada-born Governor General, Boy is likewise appointed Lieutenant-Governor of Ontario. The most convincing parallel is that Boy becomes the chair of the board of Governors which runs the school at which Ramsay teaches, much as Robertson Davies spent his career at the University of Toronto as the Master of Massey College. But the Staunton character is highly fictionalized. Davies has said that aspects of the character are more reflective of his father.

== Plot summary ==
Dunstan Ramsay, aging history teacher at Colborne College, is enraged by the patronizing tone of a newspaper article announcing his retirement. Hoping to prove that he has lived a worthwhile and fulfilling life, Ramsay pens a letter to the school's headmaster retelling the story.

Ramsay (who as a child was known as Dunstable, his mother's maiden name) starts with the defining incident of his life, that in which a snowball thrown by Percy Boyd Staunton, and intended for himself, accidentally hits Mary Dempster. Mrs. Dempster, pregnant young wife of the town's Baptist preacher Amasa Dempster, is sent into labour by the shock. Her sickly son Paul is born prematurely. This event ties these four characters together for the rest of the novel.

Apparently afflicted with severe mental trauma by the incident, Mrs. Dempster's behavior grows progressively more erratic until she is ostracized from polite society after being found having sex with a homeless tramp in a gravel pit, leading Paul Dempster to become an outcast in the village. While Ramsay takes pity on Paul and often keeps him company, Staunton refuses to take responsibility for throwing the snowball. The rift between the two deepens after Staunton begins a romantic relationship with Ramsay's crush Leola Cruikshank.

When Ramsay's gravely injured brother Willie apparently makes a miraculous recovery after Mrs. Dempster prays at his bedside, Ramsay comes to suspect that Mrs. Dempster is capable of performing miracles, which is seemingly confirmed after Ramsay himself has a vision of her shortly before miraculously surviving an artillery blast at the Battle of Ypres in World War I, losing his left leg in the process. Upon awakening in a military hospital from a six-month coma, he learns that he was initially presumed dead and posthumously won a Victoria Cross, and that his parents died from Spanish Influenza before learning that he was still alive. While recovering in the hospital, Ramsay has an affair with nurse Diana Marfleet, but breaks up with her after rejecting her marriage proposal, prompting Diana to playfully nickname him "Dunstan" after the 10th-century English saint who supposedly resisted the temptations of the Devil; this conversation later inspires Ramsay to have his first name legally changed to "Dunstan". Upon returning to Deptford, he learns that Staunton has become engaged to Leola, while Mrs. Dempster has been taken in by a relative after apparently going insane, and Paul Dempster has run away from home to join the circus.

After becoming a schoolteacher, Ramsay earns a reputation as an eccentric due to his interest in hagiology (the study of saints). Meanwhile, Staunton—now known as "Boy," shortened from his middle name—becomes a fabulously wealthy businessman. Despite tacitly resenting Boy for his money and status, Ramsay maintains an uneasy friendship with him and Leola, often accepting his financial assistance. Later, Ramsay becomes convinced that Mrs. Dempster is a saint following a chance encounter with Joel Surgeoner—the man who had sex with her in the gravel pit—who miraculously turned his life around after his sexual encounter with her. After successfully tracking Mrs. Dempster to Toronto, Ramsay offers to become her caretaker.

Following the birth of her son David, Leola becomes increasingly unhappy with her marriage to Boy, finding herself unable to adjust to high-society life due to her provincial upbringing. The Stauntons' marital difficulties culminate in Leola unsuccessfully attempting suicide on Christmas Eve in 1936 after a fight with Boy. When Leola dies of pneumonia a few years later, Ramsay suspects that she intentionally brought about her death by leaving her window open.

Ramsay's deepening obsession with hagiology leads him to travel to Europe to meet with the Bollandists (a society of Jesuit scholars who chronicle the lives of saints) after they agree to publish one of his articles. During his trip, he develops a close relationship with elderly Jesuit priest Padre Blazon, who specializes in chronicling the earthly side of saints' lives, believing that most saints are much more flawed and human than history might choose to remember them.

While in Mexico City on a six-month sabbatical from Colborne College, Ramsay attends a magic show put on by the mysterious illusionist Magnus Eisengrim, who is revealed to be an adult Paul Dempster. Intrigued by Eisengrim's spectacular illusions, Ramsay joins his entourage as he tours the world with his magic act, and gradually becomes close to Eisengrim's wealthy patroness Liesl, an eccentric woman with a bizarre androgynous appearance. Liesl, who becomes Ramsay's lover, senses that he has never been truly happy, having spent most of his life being overshadowed by other people whose lives have intersected with his own. To help him make sense of his role in the world, Liesl suggests that Ramsay is fated to play the part of "fifth business," a term for a supporting player in a stage show whose role can’t be easily classified, but nonetheless plays a vital role in resolving the plot.

Ramsay's recollections ultimately reach their climax in 1968 after Ramsay and Eisengrim both cross paths with Boy following a show in Toronto. In a tense conversation, Eisengrim reveals his true identity to Boy, and Ramsay tells Eisengrim about the events in December 1908 that led to his premature birth. Recalling the incident, Ramsay states that the snowball that Boy threw at Mrs. Dempster had a rock concealed in it, and claims that he still has the rock. Boy, however, still refuses to admit to throwing the snowball, denying any responsibility for Mrs. Dempster's misfortunes. After Boy and Eisengrim storm out of the room, Ramsay finds the rock missing.

Hours later, Boy is found dead in his car after apparently driving into a river, leaving the police unsure whether his death was murder or suicide. Curiously, a stone is found placed in his mouth, which Ramsay believes to be the rock that Boy threw at Mrs. Dempster as a child. Later, while watching a fortune-telling display at Eisengrim's magic show, Ramsay collapses from a sudden heart attack after someone in the audience cries out "Who killed Boy Staunton?" Onstage, the fortune-telling "Brazen Head" cryptically replies that he was killed by five people: by himself, by the woman he knew, by the woman he did not know, by the man who granted his inmost wish, and by "the inevitable fifth, who was keeper of his conscience and the keeper of the stone."

With that, Ramsay concludes the story of his life, saying only, "And that, headmaster, is all I have to tell you."

== Themes ==
Davies, then an avid student of Carl Jung's ideas, deploys them in Fifth Business. Characters are clear examples of Jungian archetypes and events demonstrate Jung's idea of synchronicity. A stone allegedly thrown at Ramsay when he was a child reappears decades later in a scandalous suicide or murder. Ramsay's character is a classic introverted personality, contrasted throughout the book with the extroverted sensuality of Boy Staunton. Ramsay dedicates his life to genuine religious feeling as he saw it in his 'fool-saint' Mary Dempster, whose son grows up to be the very archetype of the Magician.

Robertson Davies' interest in psychology has a massive influence on the actions in the book. The prominence of matriarchs in Dunstan's life can be linked to Sigmund Freud's Oedipus complex (Dunstan loves Diana and Mrs. Dempster, despite their motherly positions in his life). Carl Jung's concept of individualisation plays a role when Liesl discusses Dunstan's yet-unlived life and the idea that he must have balance in his life. Erik Erikson's stages of psychosocial development can also be seen in the choices Boy makes compared to the choices Dunstan makes (e.g. Boy chooses intimacy while Dunstan chooses isolation).

Davies wrote a prose that both poked fun at pretentious scholarship and enjoyed joking allusions, as in the names of Ramsay's girl friends, Agnes Day, Gloria Mundy and Libby Doe. He explained these later as "Agnes, the Sufferer – a type well known to all men; Gloria, the Good Time Girl, and Libby, the energetic go-getter". Agnes Day is a play on the Latin religious phrase agnus Dei, "lamb of God". Libby Doe is a play on the word "libido", borrowed from Latin by Freud to mean the inner impulse-driven part of the psyche. Gloria Mundy is a play on the Latin religious phrase Sic transit gloria mundi, or "Thus passes the glory of the world."

== Title ==
Those roles which, being neither those of hero nor Heroine, Confidante nor Villain, but which were none the less essential to bring about the Recognition or the denouement were called the Fifth Business in drama and Opera companies organized according to the old style; the player who acted these parts was often referred to as Fifth Business.

— purportedly Tho. Overskou, Den Danske Skueplads

Pressured by his publisher to define "Fifth Business," Davies added this opening quotation. Queried later by the book's Norwegian translator Sigmund Hoftun who failed to find the quotation in the (authentic) Danish book, Davies wrote to him 13 August 1979, "it is not from Overskou, because I invented it."

== Principal characters ==
- Dunstan (Dunstable) Ramsay – The protagonist and narrator. Ramsay has been offended by his retirement notice in the College Chronicle and intends to prove he has had an interesting life. He served in World War I and received a Victoria Cross. He becomes a scholar of saints and myths, and spends time with Bollandist scholars.
- 'Boy' (Percy Boyd) Staunton – Ramsay's "lifelong friend and enemy" who throws a snowball at him which instead hits Mary Dempster, thereby precipitating the premature birth of Paul Dempster and her subsequent slide into madness. Staunton changes his name from Percy to Boy. A talented businessman and investor, he becomes fabulously wealthy in the sugar-processing business in Canada, eventually owning a conglomerate involved in many different industries (Alpha Corporation). A charming man, he has an immense need for sex.
- Mary Dempster – Ten years older than Ramsay, she plays a pivotal role in his life. She has some saint-like qualities and is held in an insane asylum.
- Paul Dempster – Son of Mary Dempster. Ten years younger than Dunstan Ramsay, he outshines Ramsay in conjuring. He leaves town with a travelling circus. He becomes the magician known as 'Magnus Eisengrim,' and is the protagonist of World of Wonders in this trilogy.
- Diana Marfleet – The nurse who cares for Ramsay after he is wounded during World War I. She is his first sexual partner. Diana introduces him to musicals in England. He refuses to marry her, believing that she has too maternal a role in his life.
- Leola Staunton (née Cruikshank) – The first love of Ramsay, she marries Boy Staunton. Beautiful but volatile, she cannot live up to her ambitious husband's expectations.
- Liselotte (Liesl) Vitzlipützli – Daughter of a millionaire Swiss watchmaker, she assists Magnus Eisengrim in his traveling magic show. She is bisexual, and unusually tall and with large features. Always speaking in monologues, she becomes Ramsay's confessor, lover, and critic.

== Reception ==
On the 9 January 1971, Fifth Business reached first place on the Toronto Daily Star's best seller list, where it stayed in first or second place until that April.
