= Robertson Davies =

Canadian novelist (1913–1995)

Robertson Davies CC OOnt FRSL FRSC
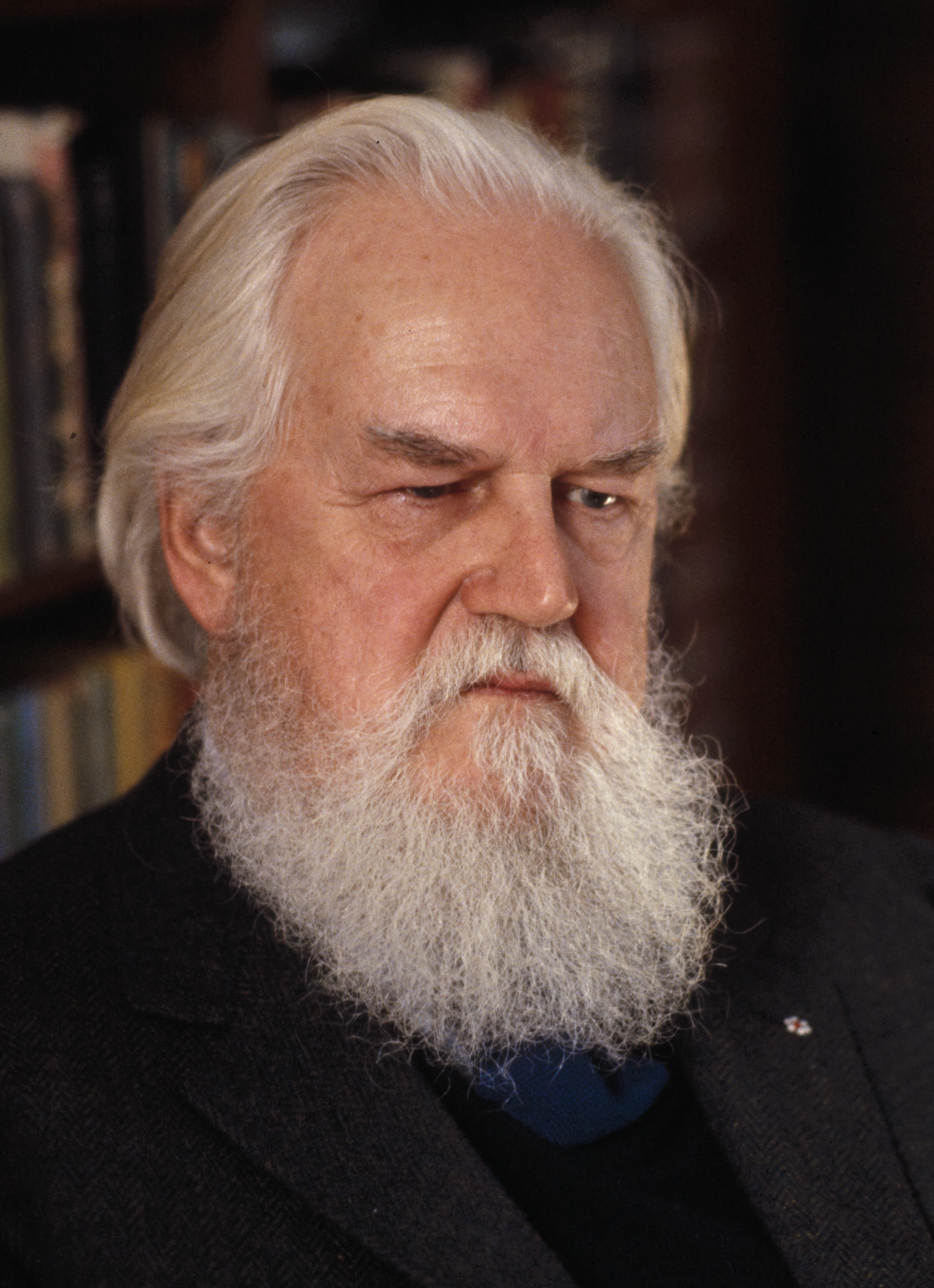
- Davies in 1982
- Born: 28 August 1913; Thamesville, Ontario, Canada
- Died: 2 December 1995 (aged 82); Orangeville, Ontario, Canada
- Education: Queen's University (did not graduate); Balliol College, Oxford
- Occupations: Journalist, playwright, professor, critic, novelist
- Spouse: Brenda Ethel Mathews (m. 1940)
- Children: 3 daughters
- Writing career
- Genres: Novels, plays, essays and reviews
- Notable works: The Deptford Trilogy, The Cornish Trilogy, The Salterton Trilogy

William Robertson Davies (28 August 1913 – 2 December 1995) was a Canadian novelist, playwright, critic, journalist, and professor. He was one of Canada's best known and most popular authors and one of its most distinguished "men of letters", a term Davies gladly accepted for himself. Davies was the founding Master of Massey College, a graduate residential college associated with the University of Toronto.

== Biography ==
=== Early life ===
Davies was born in Thamesville, Ontario, the third son of William Rupert Davies and Florence Sheppard McKay.

Growing up, Robertson was surrounded by books and lively language. William was a newspaperman from Welshpool, Wales, and would one day become a member of the Canadian Senate (serving from 1942 to his death in 1967); both of Robertson Davies's parents were voracious readers. He followed in their footsteps and read everything he could. He also participated in theatrical productions as a child and developed a lifelong interest in drama.

He spent his formative years in Renfrew, Ontario (and renamed it as "Blairlogie" in his novel What's Bred in the Bone); many of the novel's characters are named after families he knew there.

He attended Upper Canada College in Toronto from 1926 to 1932 and while there attended services at the Church of St. Mary Magdalene. He would later leave the Presbyterian Church and join Anglicanism over objections to Calvinist theology. Davies later used his experience of the ceremonial of High Mass at St. Mary Magdalene's in his novel The Cunning Man.

After Upper Canada College, Davies studied at Queen's University at Kingston, Ontario, from 1932 until 1935. According to the Queen's Journal, Davies enrolled as a special student not working towards a degree, because he was unable to pass the mathematics component of Queen's entrance exam. At Queen's, he wrote for the student paper, The Queen's Journal, where he wrote a literary column.

Davies left Canada to study at Balliol College, Oxford, where he received a BLitt degree in 1938. The next year he published his thesis, Shakespeare's Boy Actors, and embarked on an acting career outside London. In 1940, he played small roles and did literary work for the director at the Old Vic Repertory Company in London.

=== Middle years ===
In 1940, he took the position of literary editor at Saturday Night magazine. Two years later, he became editor of the Peterborough Examiner in the small city of Peterborough, Ontario, northeast of Toronto. Again he was able to mine his experiences here for many of the characters and situations which later appeared in his plays and novels.

Davies, along with family members William Rupert Davies and Arthur Davies, purchased several media outlets. Along with the Examiner newspaper, they owned the Kingston Whig-Standard newspaper, CHEX-AM, CKWS-AM, CHEX-TV, and CKWS-TV.

During his tenure as editor of the Examiner, which lasted from 1942 to 1955 (he subsequently served as publisher from 1955 to 1965), Davies published a total of 18 books, produced several of his own plays, and wrote articles for various journals.

Davies set out his theory of acting in his Shakespeare for Young Players (1947), and then put theory into practice when he wrote Eros at Breakfast, a one-act play which was named best Canadian play of the year by the 1948 Dominion Drama Festival. Eros at Breakfast was followed by Fortune, My Foe in 1949 and At My Heart's Core, a three-act play, in 1950.

Meanwhile, Davies was writing humorous essays in the Examiner under the pseudonym Samuel Marchbanks. Some of these were collected and published in The Diary of Samuel Marchbanks (1947), The Table Talk of Samuel Marchbanks (1949), and later in Samuel Marchbanks' Almanack (1967). An omnibus edition of the three Marchbanks books, with new notes by the author, was published under the title The Papers of Samuel Marchbanks in 1985.

During the 1950s, Davies played a major role in launching the Stratford Shakespearean Festival of Canada. He served on the Festival's board of governors, and collaborated with the Festival's director, Sir Tyrone Guthrie, in publishing three books about the Festival's early years.

Although his first love was drama and he had achieved some success with his occasional humorous essays, Davies found his greatest success in fiction. His first three novels, which later became known as The Salterton Trilogy, were Tempest-Tost (1951, originally conceived as a play), Leaven of Malice (1954, also the basis of the unsuccessful play Love and Libel) which won the Stephen Leacock Award for Humour, and A Mixture of Frailties (1958). These novels explored the difficulty of sustaining a cultural life in Canada, and life on a small-town newspaper, subjects of which Davies had first-hand knowledge.

In a 1958 essay on Nabokov's Lolita in Saturday Night, he wrote that the theme was "the exploitation of a weak adult by a corrupt child".

=== 1960s ===
Exterior of the college from the southeast on Hoskin Avenue, showing residence of the master

In 1960, Davies joined Trinity College at the University of Toronto, where he would teach literature until 1981. The following year he published a collection of essays on literature, A Voice From the Attic, and was awarded the Lorne Pierce Medal for his literary achievements.

In 1963, he became the Master of Massey College, the University of Toronto's new graduate college. During his stint as Master, he initiated a tradition of writing and telling ghost stories at the yearly Christmas celebrations. These stories were later collected in the book High Spirits (1982).

=== 1970s ===
Davies drew on his interest in Jungian psychology to create Fifth Business (1970), a novel that relies heavily on Davies's own experiences, his love of myth and magic, and his knowledge of small-town mores. The narrator, like Davies, is of immigrant Canadian background, with a father who runs the town paper. The book's characters act in roles that roughly correspond to Jungian archetypes according to Davies's belief in the predominance of spirit over the things of the world.

Davies built on the success of Fifth Business with two more novels: The Manticore (1972), a novel cast largely in the form of a Jungian analysis (for which he received that year's Governor General's Literary Award), and World of Wonders (1975). Together these three books came to be known as The Deptford Trilogy.

Davies' characters (such as gypsies) gifted with psychic or intuitive talents reflected his personal interest in deep inner strata of himself and other people. His Jungian studies served to clarify and validate such aspects in his own awareness. He came to feel such dimensions of human potentials had been repressed due to rationalism's restrictive and dominant role in modern Western culture.

=== 1980s and 1990s ===
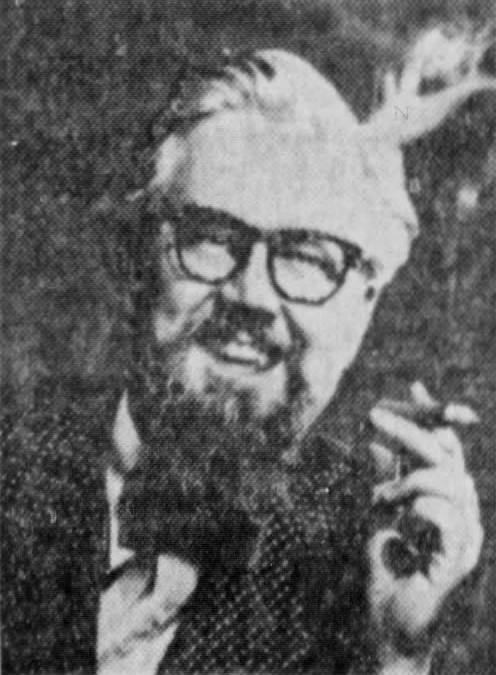
Davies in 1961

When Davies retired from his position at the university, his seventh novel, a satire of academic life, The Rebel Angels (1981), was published. The novel was followed by What's Bred in the Bone (1985) which was short-listed for the Booker Prize for fiction in 1986. The Lyre of Orpheus (1988) follows these two books in what became known as The Cornish Trilogy.

During his retirement from academics, Davies continued to write novels which further established him as a major figure in the literary world: Murther and Walking Spirits (1991) and The Cunning Man (1994). A third novel in what would have been a further trilogy – the Toronto Trilogy – was in progress at the time of Davies's death. He also realized a long-held dream when he penned the libretto to Randolph Peters' opera: The Golden Ass, based on The Metamorphoses of Lucius Apuleius, just like that written by one of the characters in Davies's 1958 A Mixture of Frailties. The opera was performed by the Canadian Opera Company at the Hummingbird Centre in Toronto, in April 1999, several years after Davies's death.

In its obituary, The Times wrote: "Davies encompassed all the great elements of life ... His novels combined deep seriousness and psychological inquiry with fantasy and exuberant mirth." He remained close friends with John Kenneth Galbraith, attending Galbraith's eighty-fifth birthday party in Boston in 1993; the author became so close a friend and colleague of the American novelist John Irving that Irving gave one of the scripture readings at Davies's funeral in the chapel of Trinity College, Toronto. He also wrote in support of Salman Rushdie when the latter was threatened by a fatwā from Ayatollah Ruhollah Khomeini of Iran in reaction to supposed anti-Islam expression in his novel The Satanic Verses.

== Public lectures ==
In 1990, Davies delivered the fifth Erasmus Lecture, titled Literature and Moral Purpose, sponsored by First Things magazine and the Institute on Religion and Public Life. In his address, Davies reflected on the relationship between literature, imagination, and ethics, arguing that serious fiction has an essential role in shaping moral understanding. His lecture continued the Erasmus series’ exploration of how culture and faith inform the public and intellectual life of the modern world.

== Personal life ==
On 2 February 1940, Davies married Australian Brenda Mathews (1917–2013), whom he had met at Oxford. Brenda was then working as stage manager for the theatre. They spent their honeymoon in the Welsh countryside at Fronfraith Hall, Abermule, Montgomery, the family house owned by Rupert Davies.

The couple settled in Peterborough, Ontario, where they founded the Peterborough Little Theatre in 1947. Davies never learned to drive and often relied on his wife to drive him. They were married for 55 years.

They had three daughters: Miranda Davies (born 1940), Jennifer Surridge (born 1942) and Rosamond Bailey (born 1947). By the time Brenda died in 2013, they had four grandchildren and three great-grandchildren.

Brenda was the first to read Davies's work. After his death in 1995, she and their daughter Jennifer took charge of his literary estate and founded Pendragon Ink to manage the rights to his work. Together, they co-edited Happy Alchemy, a collection of his writing which was published in 1997 . In 2015, Jennifer and Ramsay Derry co-edited A Celtic Temperament: Robertson Davies as Diarist, a selection of her father's diaries.

== Death ==
Davies died after a stroke on 2 December 1995 in Orangeville, Ontario. He was 82.

A memorial for Davies was held at Convocation Hall at the University of Toronto. His friend John Kenneth Galbraith gave a tribute.

== Awards and honours ==
=== Literary awards and shortlists ===
- 1948: Best Canadian play at the Dominion Drama Festival for Eros at Breakfast.
- 1955: Stephen Leacock Memorial Medal for Humour for Leaven of Malice.
- 1961: Lorne Pierce Medal for contributions to Canadian literature.
- 1972: Governor General's Literary Award for English-language fiction for The Manticore.
- 1984: World Fantasy Award in the collection and anthology category for High Spirits.
- 1986: Booker Prize shortlist for What's Bred in the Bone.

=== Other honours ===
- 1972: Appointed a Companion of the Order of Canada.
- 1980: Became the first Canadian honorary member of the American Academy and Institute of Arts and Letters.
- 1991: Honorary Doctor of Letters from the University of Oxford.

=== Recognition after his death ===
- 2007: Toronto named a park after Davies.
- 2013: Canada Post issued a stamp on the 100th anniversary of his birth.
- 2022: Inducted into the Chatham-Kent Arts and Culture Heroes Wall of Fame in the literary arts category.

== Works ==
=== Novels ===
- The Salterton Trilogy
  - Tempest-Tost (1951)
  - Leaven of Malice (1954)
  - A Mixture of Frailties (1958)
- The Deptford Trilogy
  - Fifth Business (1970)
  - The Manticore (1972)
  - World of Wonders (1975)
- The Cornish Trilogy
  - The Rebel Angels (1981)
  - What's Bred in the Bone (1985)
  - The Lyre of Orpheus (1988)
- The "Toronto Trilogy" (incomplete)
  - Murther and Walking Spirits (1991)
  - The Cunning Man (1994)

=== Essays ===
Fictional essays

- The Diary of Samuel Marchbanks (1947)
- The Table Talk of Samuel Marchbanks (1949)
- Samuel Marchbanks' Almanack (1967)

edited by the author into:

- The Papers of Samuel Marchbanks (1985)

Criticism

- Shakespeare's Boy Actors (1939) (as W. Robertson Davies)
- Shakespeare for Young Players: A Junior Course (1942)
- Renown at Stratford (1953) (with Tyrone Guthrie)
- Twice Have the Trumpets Sounded (1954) (with Tyrone Guthrie)
- Thrice the Brindled Cat Hath Mew'd (1955) (with Tyrone Guthrie)
- A Voice From the Attic (1960) also published as The Personal Art
- A Feast of Stephen (1970)
- Stephen Leacock (1970)
- One Half of Robertson Davies (1977)
- The Enthusiasms of Robertson Davies (1979; revised 1990) (edited by Judith Skelton Grant)
- The Well-Tempered Critic (1981) (edited by Judith Skelton Grant)
- The Mirror of Nature (1983)
- Reading and Writing (1993) (two essays, later collected in The Merry Heart)
- The Merry Heart (1996)
- Happy Alchemy (1997) (edited by Jennifer Surridge and Brenda Davies)

=== Plays ===
- Overlaid (1948)
- Eros at Breakfast (1948)
- Hope Deferred (1948)
- King Phoenix (1948)
- At the Gates of the Righteous (1949)
- Fortune My Foe (1949)
- The Voice of the People (1949)
- At My Heart's Core (1950)
- A Masque of Aesop (1952)
- Hunting Stuart (1955)
- A Jig for the Gypsy (1955)
- General Confession (1956)
- A Masque of Mr. Punch (1963)
- Question Time (1975)
- Brothers in the Black Art (1981)

=== Short story collection ===
- High Spirits (1982)

=== Libretti ===
- Doctor Canon's Cure (1982)
- Jezebel (1993)
- The Golden Ass (1999)

=== Letters and diaries ===
- For Your Eye Alone (2000) (edited by Judith Skelton Grant)
- Discoveries (2002) (edited by Judith Skelton Grant)
- A Celtic Temperament: Robertson Davies as Diarist (2015) (edited by Jennifer Surridge and Ramsay Derry)

=== Collections ===
- Conversations with Robertson Davies (1989) (Edited by J. Madison Davis)
- The Quotable Robertson Davies: The Wit and Wisdom of the Master (2005) (collected by James Channing Shaw)
- The Merry Heart: Reflections on Reading Writing, and the World of Books (New York: Viking, 1997). ISBN 9780670873661
