= Clarke, Irwin & Company =

Defunct Canadian book publishing company

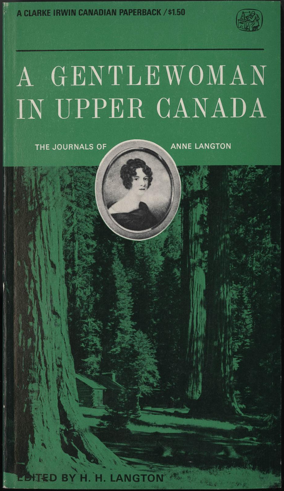
- Cover of A gentlewoman in Upper Canada, 1950
- Status: Defunct
- Founded: 1930
- Founder: William H. Clarke, John C.W. Irwin, Irene Irwin Clarke
- Successor: Nelson Canada
- Country of origin: Canada
- Headquarters location: Toronto
- Publication types: Books

Clarke, Irwin & Company was a Canadian publishing house based in Toronto, Ontario. Established in 1930, it was purchased by Thomas Nelson Publishing in 2002. The company published works by prominent Canadian authors, artists, and poets, including Robertson Davies, Emily Carr, A.Y. Jackson, Adele Wiseman, Timothy Findley, and Alden Nowlan. The company was also known as a producer of educational works and textbooks.

== History ==
In 1930, William H. Clarke, formerly of Maclean-Hunter Publishing and the Macmillan Company of Canada, partnered with John C.W. Irwin, a Toronto bookseller, to start a new publishing house. They were joined by Irene Irwin Clarke, Clarke's wife and Irwin's sister. The company quickly established publishing arrangements with several British and American book companies, including the University of London Press, George G. Harrap & Co., Henry Holt & Co., E. P. Dutton, and Rinehart & Co. The company started a lucrative trade in public school and university textbooks in the mid-1930s.

William Clarke began a partnership with the Oxford University Press (OUP) in 1936. The Canadian division of the company had seen hard times during the Great Depression, and, after the death of its director Samuel Gundy, William Clarke was able to take control of OUP. The two imprints operated from the same address for the next thirteen years. The partnership was responsible for the first Bible completely printed and bound in Canada.

The company saw commercial success with a Canadian writer with the publication of Emily Carr's Klee Wyck. Although originally released by OUP, Clarke, Irwin published an abridged educational version used heavily in Canadian schools. The collection of memoirs won the 1941 Governor General's Award for Literary Merit. By the early 1940s, the relationship between William Clarke and John Irwin had frayed. Irwin, a graduate from the University of Toronto's Faculty of Forestry, was an outspoken conservationist. Backlash from Irwin's many public speeches may have led to arguments between the two men. In 1943, Irwin left and started a rival company, the Book Society of Canada.

After William Clarke died in 1955, Irene Irwin Clarke took over much of the managerial duties. By the 1960s, Clarke, Irwin had acquired publication rights from several more American and British publishing houses. A partnership with Jonathan Cape had popular spy novelists Ian Fleming and Len Deighton published under Clarke, Irwin in Canada. Through Chatto & Windus, the company was able to print several backlists, including authors such as Fyodor Dostoevsky and Lawrence Durrell. In 1972, Clarke, Irwin became the first Canadian publisher to have a children's book editor when they hired author Janet Lunn.

The company did well with its textbook division until the late 1960s, when the acquisition policies of Canadian public schools changed, ending preferential treatment for the company. Clarke, Irwin, & Company went into decline in the 1970s, reducing its editorial staff from forty-two to nine. William and Irene Clarke's son, William (Bill) Clarke, became managing director in the 1980s. Government loans kept it afloat until 1983, when the company went into receivership. It was purchased by former partner John Irwin's Book Society of Canada, now run by John's son. The imprint would see a name change to Irwin Company. It was sold to General Publishing, parent of Stoddart Publishing, in 1988. It was purchased by Thomas Nelson Publishing in 2002, which saw the end of the name in the publishing business.

== Notable publications ==
Apart from Carr's Klee Wyck, Clarke, Irwin had success with several other art related books, including A.Y. Jackson's autobiography, A Painter's Country: The Autobiography of A.Y. Jackson (1958) as well as a popular collection of Jackson's sketches, A.Y.'s Canada: Pencil Drawings by A.Y. Jackson (1968). Robertson Davies' first works were published by the company, including educational books like Shakespeare for Young Players (1942) and novels including The Diary of Samuel Marchbanks (1947) and Tempest-Tost (1951). Although not a major source of poetry, Clarke, Irwin had success with Alden Nowlan's collection Bread, Wine and Salt in 1968. Quebec playwright Gratien Gélinas published several of his plays with the company. Timothy Findley was a late acquisition in 1978, before the sale to the Book Society of Canada.

The company published many non-fiction works, and its textbooks and readers were common in Canadian schools. The "Canadian Portraits Series" introduced younger readers to Canadian authors. William Kilbourn's biography of William Lyon Mackenzie, The Firebrand, was received well among critics. The Shape of Scandal, by journalist and civil servant Richard Gwyn, was one of the company's best selling books of the 1960s. Bruce Hutchison's The Fraser (1950), a work on British Columbia's Fraser River, was part of Rinehart and Company's popular Rivers of America series. Hilda Neatby's So Little for the Mind caused public debate about Canada's education system upon its release in 1953.
