= The Peterborough Examiner =

Canadian newspaper in Ontario

- Front page of the June 1, 2020 edition
- Type: Daily newspaper
- Owner: Metroland Media Group (Torstar)
- Publisher: Brandon Grosvenor
- Editor: Marcus Tully
- Staff writers: Lance Anderson, Mike Davies, Sebastian Johnston-Lindsay, Joelle Kovach, Clifford Skarskedt, Todd Vandonk, Catherine Whitnall
- Founded: 1847
- Circulation: 12,352 weekdays 13,108 Saturdays (as of 2011)
- ISSN: 0839-0878
- Website: www.thepeterboroughexaminer.com

The Peterborough Examiner is a newspaper that services Peterborough, Ontario and its surrounding area. The paper started circulation in 1847, and is currently owned by Torstar and operated by its Metroland division. Between 1942 and 1955, it was edited by Canadian man of letters Robertson Davies, whose unique three-paragraph editorial style won several awards. Davies remained owner and publisher of the Examiner and Ralph Hancox the editor until 1967, when it was sold to the Thomson chain of newspapers. Subsequently, Sterling, Hollinger and Sun Media owned the newspaper before Postmedia.

The Peterborough Examiner was one of several Postmedia newspapers purchased by Torstar in a transaction between the two companies which concluded on November 27, 2017. The paper continued to be published by the Metroland Media Group subsidiary of Torstar. In late May 2020, Torstar accepted an offer for the sale of all of its assets to Nordstar Capital, a deal expected to close by year end.

It is the only daily newspaper in Peterborough city and county. Its current publisher is Brandon Grosvenor and managing editor is Marcus Tully.

In the summer of 2020, in response to the COVID-19 pandemic in Ontario, the newspaper permanently closed its newsroom, with all staff working remotely.

== See also ==
- List of newspapers in Canada
