= September 1913 =

September 1913 may refer to:

- September 1913 (month), a 30-day month that began on a Monday
- September 1913 (poem), a poem by W. B. Yeats
