= September 1913 (month) =

Month of 1913

<<	September 1913					>>
Su	Mo	Tu	We	Th	Fr	Sa
	1	2	3	4	5	6
7	8	9	10	11	12	13
14	15	16	17	18	19	20
21	22	23	24	25	26	27
28	29	30

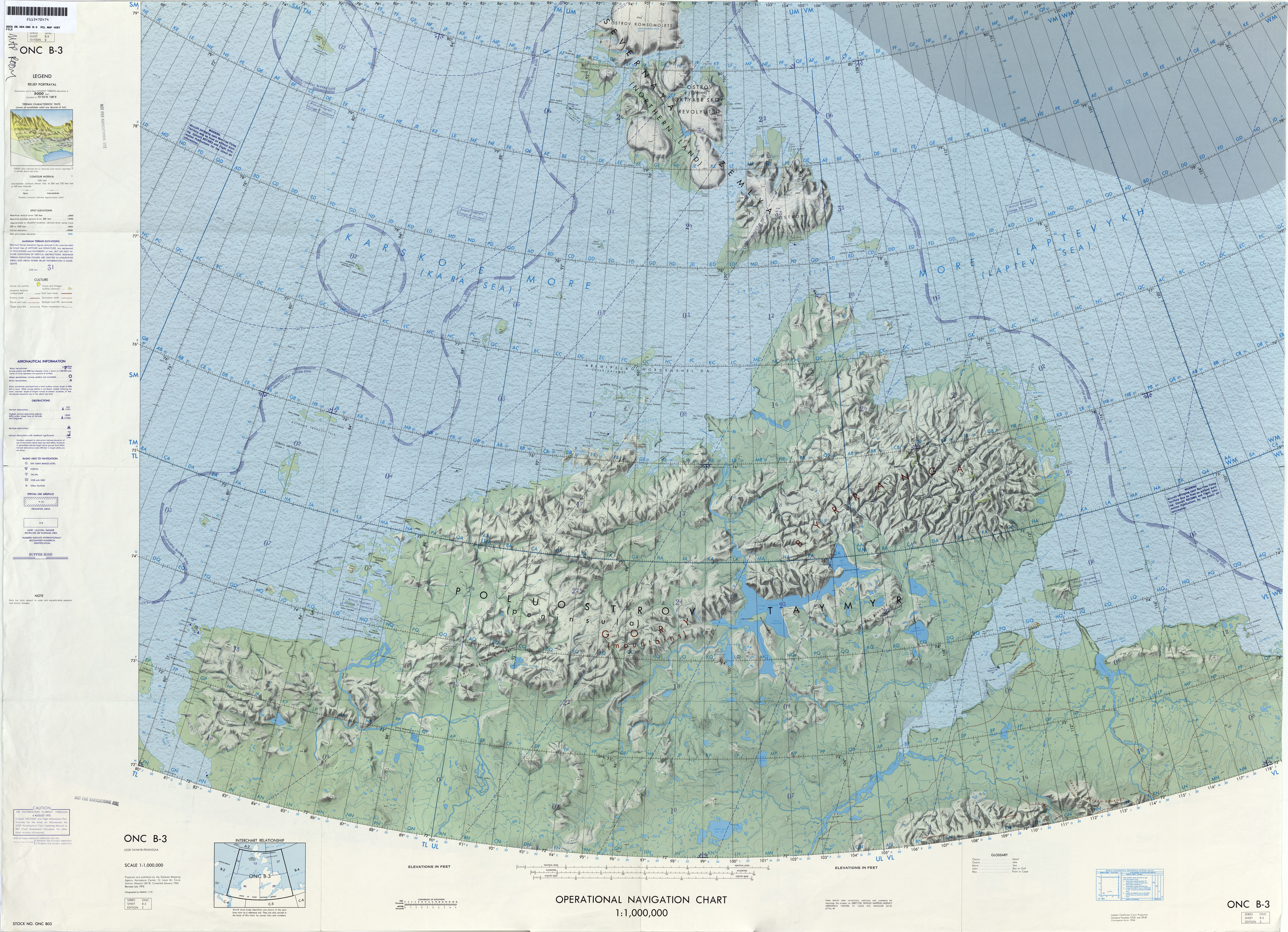
September 3, 1913: Russians discover the last uncharted major islands on Earth, the Severnaya Zemlya

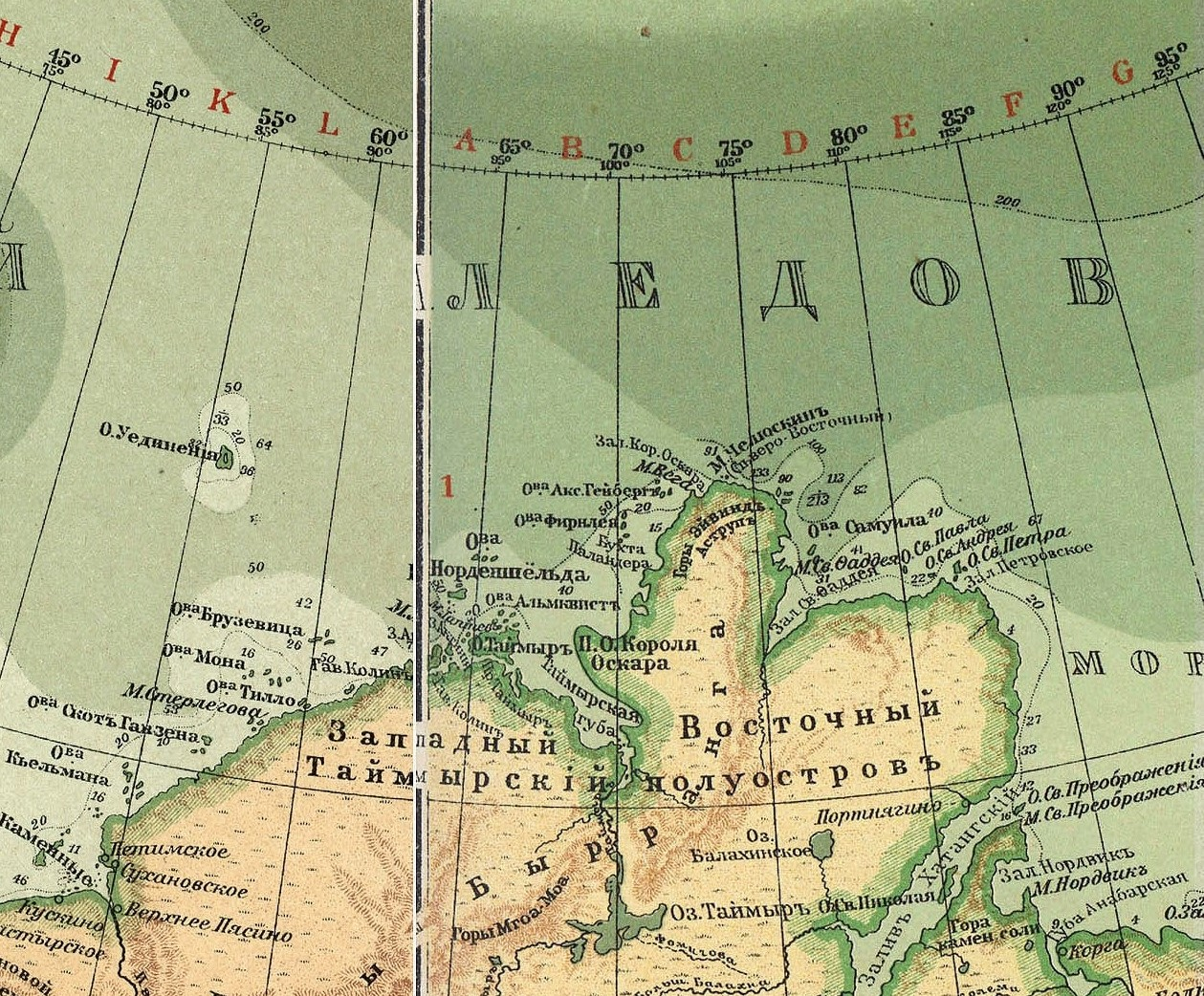
A pre-1913 map of the area

The following events occurred in September 1913:

== September 1, 1913 (Monday) ==
- The anti-government rebellion in southern China was brought to an end, when all six rebellious provinces surrendered to the Beiyang Army, led by General Zhang Xun, retook Nanjing.
- French aviator Adolphe Pégoud demonstrated that he could fly an airplane upside-down on a sustained flight, traveling for 400 metres (1,300 ft). He was using a specially constructed Bleriot monoplane, and after reaching 3,000 feet (910 m), put the plane in a quarter-loop and kept it in the upside down position. Pégoud, who would fly a full vertical loop on September 21, also did a "vertical-S" trick, which was reported in the press as having "looped the loop".
- George Bernard Shaw's satirical play, Androcles and the Lion, was performed for the first time.
- A tropical storm off the East Coast of the United States intensified into a Category 1 hurricane.
- The National Conservation Exposition officially opened in Knoxville, Tennessee.
- Lucy Maud Montgomery published her novel The Golden Road, one of the few not involving her famous character Anne Shirley. The story was inspired by childhood stories shared by her great-aunt Mary Lawson, who Montgomery dedicated in her book.
- The first major post office opened in Kingfisher, Oklahoma. It would be added to the National Register of Historic Places in 1978.
- The Willamette University College of Medicine merged with the medical program of the University of Oregon.
- Born:
  - Ludwig Merwart, Austrian artist, noted artist for the documenta exhibition; in Vienna, Austria-Hungary (present-day Austria) (d. 1979)
  - Woody Stephens, American racehorse trainer, trained 11 Eclipse Award horses, five time Belmont Stakes champion; as Woodford Stephens, in Stanton, Kentucky, United States (d. 1998)

== September 2, 1913 (Tuesday) ==
- A collision between two trains on the New York, New Haven and Hartford Railroad in New Haven, Connecticut killed 21 passengers and injured 30.
- A rear-end collision between two sections of the London-Scotland express at Carlisle, England caused a fire that burned 15 passengers to death.
- The village of Abbey, Saskatchewan was established.
- Born:
  - Bill Shankly, Scottish association football player and manager, midfielder for Preston from 1933 to 1949 and the Scotland national football team from 1938 to 1949, coach for Liverpool from 1959 to 1964, two time FA Cup champion; as William Shankly, in Glenbuck, Scotland (d. 1981)
  - Israel Gelfand, Soviet mathematician, known for his contributions to group theory, representation theory, and functional analysis, recipient of the Order of Lenin; in Okny, Kherson Governorate, Russian Empire (present-day Ukraine) (d. 2009)
- Died:
  - Thomas Sperry, American entrepreneur, co-founder of S&H Green Stamps (b. 1864)
  - Bill Miner, American outlaw, nicknamed "The Gentleman Robber", reputed for coming up with the phrase "Hands up!" (b. 1847)

== September 3, 1913 (Wednesday) ==
- A hurricane struck North Carolina with 85 mph (140 km/h) winds and a minimum barometric pressure of 976 mbar (28.8 inHg), causing five deaths and $4–5 million in property and crop damages.
- Severnaya Zemlya, a group of islands located above the Arctic Circle, was discovered on a hydrographic expedition by the crew of the Russian icebreakers Taimyr and Vaigach, and was named 'Emperor Nicholas II Land' by the explorers, in honor of the Tsar. The archipelago would prove to be the last major group of previously unknown lands on Earth to be discovered.
- William Howard Taft, who had finished his term as President of the United States six months earlier, was elected President of the American Bar Association.
- The battleship Reşadiye was launched by Vickers in Barrow-in-Furness, England to serve in the Ottoman Navy. She was seized by the Royal Navy at the start of World War I and recommissioned as HMS Erin. She was decommissioned in 1922.
- Born: Alan Ladd, American actor, best known for the title role in the movie Western Shane, as well as film noir films This Gun for Hire, The Glass Key, and The Blue Dahlia; in Hot Springs, Arkansas, United States (d. 1964)

== September 4, 1913 (Thursday) ==
- Ernst August Wagner, a schoolteacher in the German village of Mühlhausen, Württemberg, Germany, murdered his wife, four local children and eleven other adults, after setting fires in different locations.
- The hurricane that lashed North Carolina weakened and dissipated over Georgia.
- Dormer Tools was founded in Sheffield, England, growing to become an international supplier of high-end cutting tools.
- Born:
  - Stanford Moore, American biochemist, recipient of the Nobel Prize in Chemistry for his research into ribonuclease; in Chicago, United States (d. 1982)
  - Kenzō Tange, Japanese architect, recipient of the Pritzker Architecture Prize for developing metabolism in modern building construction; in Sakai, Empire of Japan (present-day Japan) (d. 2005)
  - Mickey Cohen, American gangster, crime boss in New York City and Los Angeles; as Meyer Harris Cohen, in New York City, United States (d. 1976)
  - Boone Guyton, American aviator, test pilot for the Vought F4U Corsair aircraft; in East St. Louis, Illinois, United States (d. 1996)
- Died:
  - Henry Billings Brown, American judge, Associate Justice of the Supreme Court of the United States from 1890 to 1906, best known for authoring the majority opinion in Plessy v. Ferguson upholding the constitutionality of racial segregation laws (b. 1836)
  - Shōzō Tanaka, Japanese politician, leader promoter of the Meiji Restoration in Japan (b. 1841)

== September 5, 1913 (Friday) ==
- A fire in the city of Hot Springs, Arkansas, destroyed 55 city blocks of property, causing damages of six million dollars. The blaze started "in a negro dwelling on Church Street," then spread southeast, destroying the county courthouse, the city high school, four hotels, the Iron Mountain railroad station and "a hundred or more business buildings and many residences."
- The Firemen's Memorial was unveiled on Riverside Drive in Manhattan, New York City to commemorate the firefighters that died in service to the city since the Revolutionary War.
- Sergei Prokofiev's Piano Concerto No. 2 was performed for the first time. The manuscript would be destroyed by fire in 1917 during the Russian Revolution, and Prokofiev would reconstruct it, introducing a new version on May 8, 1924.
- Born: George E. Valley, American nuclear physicist who developed the H2X radar for American bombers in World War II, and later conceptualized the Semi-Automatic Ground Environment (SAGE) missile defense system; in New York City, United States (d. 1999)

== September 6, 1913 (Saturday) ==
- Professional track athlete Hans Holmér won the British championship for the mile run, winning in Edinburgh at 4 minutes, 24.4 seconds.
- The Arsenal Football Club played their first game in the newly opened Arsenal Stadium in Highbury, England, with a 2–1 win against Leicester.
- Hideyo Noguchi of the Rockefeller Institute announced that he had isolated the virus that causes rabies.
- Excavation of the Panama Canal was completed, and the Culebra Cut was scheduled to be flooded on October 9.
- The Central Library, designed by architect A. E. Doyle, opened in Portland, Oregon, as one of the first libraries in the United States to be built around an open plan design. It would be added to the National Register of Historic Places in 1979.
- U.S. President Woodrow Wilson and his physician, Dr. Carey Grayson, were almost run over by a streetcar while walking back to the White House at night. To avoid an accident, a policeman jumped in front of the streetcar, raising both of his hands to signal it to stop. The car stopped within 10 feet (3.0 m) from the President and physician.
- Born:
  - Ross Munro, Canadian journalist, known for his coverage of all key Canadian military campaigns during World War II; as Robert Ross Munro, in Ottawa, Canada (d. 1990)
  - Wesley A. Swift, American religious leader, founder of the Church of Jesus Christ–Christian and proponent of the white supremacist ideology Christian Identity; in New Jersey, United States (d. 1970)
- Died: James Orr, Scottish theologian, contributor to The Fundamentals, a collection of works considered the foundation of Christian fundamentalism (b. 1844)

== September 7, 1913 (Sunday) ==
- Outraged over the killing of Japanese nationals at Nanjing, China, 15,000 people protested outside the Foreign Ministry in Tokyo and demanded military action against China. Japan demanded an apology and payment of damages, a request which would initially be ignored.
- The association football club Alagoano was established in Maceió, Brazil.
- The association football club União was established in Mogi das Cruzes, Brazil.
- Born: Valerie Taylor, American novelist, pioneer in lesbian pulp fiction during the 1950s and 1960s; as Velma Nacella Young, in Aurora, Illinois, United States (d. 1997)

== September 8, 1913 (Monday) ==
- The poem "September 1913", by W. B. Yeats, was first published, in The Irish Times, with the title "Romance in Ireland." The 32 line poem referred to late Irish separatist John O'Leary, and contained the refrain, "Romantic Ireland's dead and gone, It's with O'Leary in the grave."
- The Broadway musical Sweethearts, with music by Victor Herbert and lyrics by Robert B. Smith, premiered at the New Amsterdam Theatre in New York City.
- Born: Mary Carew, American athlete, gold medalist at the 1932 Summer Olympics; in Medford, Massachusetts, United States (d. 2002)

== September 9, 1913 (Tuesday) ==
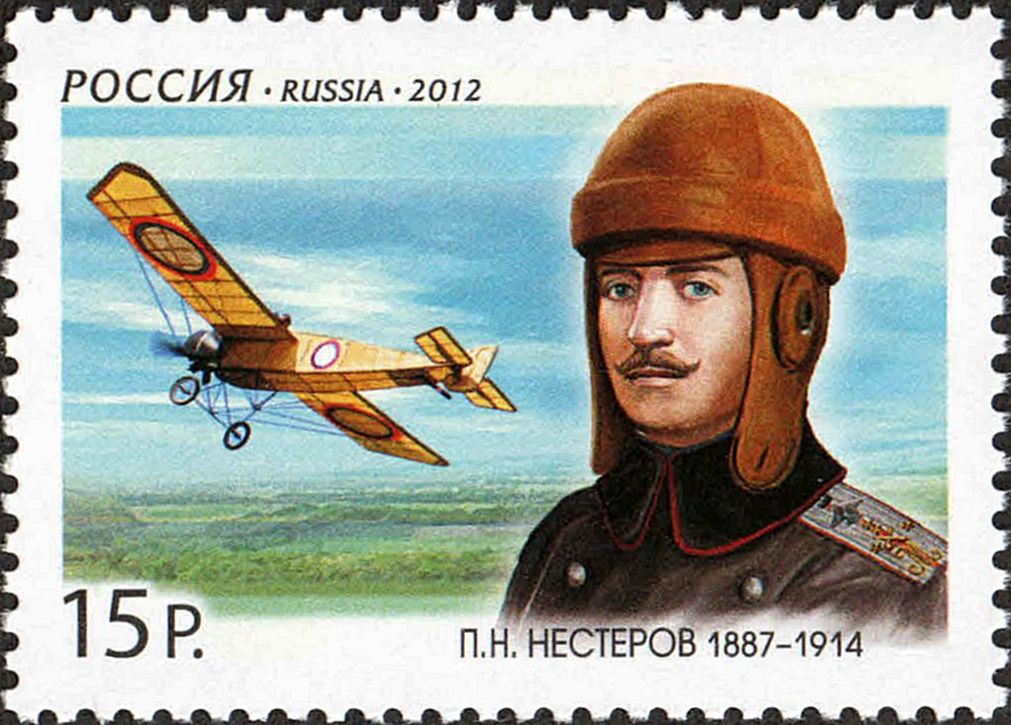
Commemorative stamp of Russian aviator Pyotr Nesterov

- In the skies near Kiev, Russian aviator Pyotr Nesterov became the first person to execute a loop. Nesterov, a pilot for the Imperial Russian Air Service took a Nieuport airplane aloft, and when he reached an altitude of 3,300 feet (1,000 m), shut off the engine, then took the plane on a vertical dive, restarted it at 2,000 feet (610 m), and "kept on pulling until the horizon slid up over his head," then came back to right-side up. When he landed, he was arrested and spent ten days in jail for negligent use of government property. Adolphe Pégoud of France would make a loop nine days later and get publicity first.
- Fourteen German Navy members were killed out of 21 crewmen on the Zeppelin L-1, newly commissioned by the Imperial German Navy, wrecked in the North Sea, 18 miles (29 km) off the coast of Heligoland.

Diagram of the Haber-Bosch process

- Chemical manufacturer BASF started the world's first plant for the production of fertilizer based on the Haber–Bosch process in Ludwigshafen, Germany, feeding today about a third of the world's population.
- The United States Department of Agriculture reported an "unprecedented" yield in wheat production for 1913. "Never before in the history of the country has there been such a bountiful wheat harvest as has been gathered this year," The New York Times noted.
- Robert Owen Jr. was awarded U.S. patent number 1,072,980 for his invention of the ratchet wrench, applied for on February 3.
- The Olivebridge Dam was completed on the Hudson River, creating the Ashokan Reservoir, to provide 250,000,000 gallons of water a day to New York City. In 1924, the Gilboa Dam would open, providing twice as much water to the city.
- The sculpture Fountain of the Great Lakes by Lorado Taft was unveiled on Michigan Avenue in Chicago. It was later moved to the Art Institute of Chicago in Grant Park.
- Born: Harry Snyder, Canadian-American entrepreneur, co-founder of In-N-Out Burger; in Vancouver, Canada (d. 1976)
- Died: Paul de Smet de Naeyer, Belgian state leader, 16th Prime Minister of Belgium (b. 1843)

== September 10, 1913 (Wednesday) ==
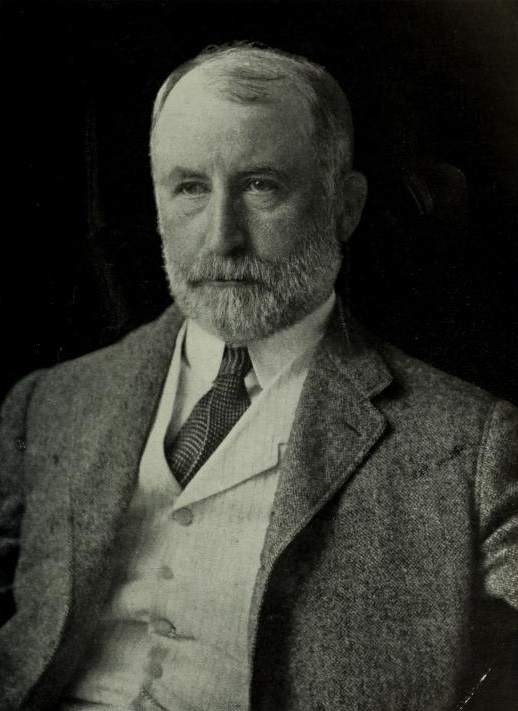
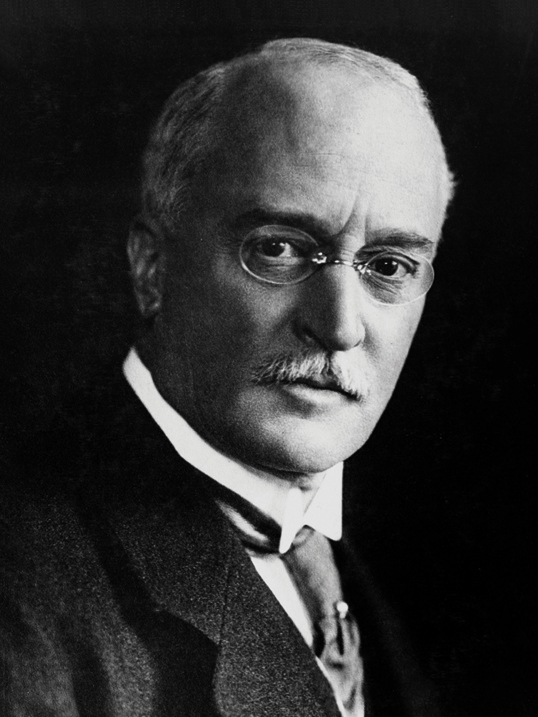
September 10 and 29, 1913: NYC Mayor Gaynor, Engine inventor Diesel, die at sea
- William Jay Gaynor, the Mayor of New York City since 1910, died suddenly while on the ocean liner RMS Baltic, as it was nearing Liverpool. Gaynor, who had announced his candidacy for re-election only one week earlier, had been in poor health since being wounded in an assassination attempt on August 9, 1910, and was succeeded by Ardolph L. Kline, who presided over the Board of Aldermen. Gaynor's body would lie in state at the Town Hall of Liverpool, after which the body was transported back to the U.S. On September 21, his funeral would be held at the City Hall in New York.
- Jean Sibelius's tone poem Luonnotar was premiered at the Three Choirs Festival in Gloucester Cathedral, England, with soprano Aino Ackté and orchestra conducted by Herbert Brewer.
- A boiler explosion aboard the U.S. Navy torpedo boat destroyer USS Craven (TB-10) killed four sailors.
- Born: Lincoln Gordon, American academic and diplomat, 9th President of Johns Hopkins University, developed the Alliance for Progress of U.S. economic aid to Latin America; as Abraham Lincoln Gordon, in New York City, United States (d. 2009)

== September 11, 1913 (Thursday) ==
- Joseph Ward, who had been Prime Minister of New Zealand until March 1912, was selected again to lead the Liberal Party after returning from an extended holiday in London, and became Leader of the Opposition.
- Dominican Republic gunboats bombarded the city of Puerto Plata, the base for anti-government rebels.
- The first edition of The Frostburg Spirit weekly newspaper was published in Frostburg, Maryland, but its time was short-lived and paper published its last edition January 1915.
- Born: Paul "Bear" Bryant, American football coach, six time NCAA Division I national champion with University of Alabama; in Moro Bottom, Arkansas, United States (d. 1983)

== September 12, 1913 (Friday) ==
- The Niels Bohr quantum model of the atom was first presented at the 83rd annual meeting of the British Association for the Advancement of Science in Birmingham, England, with mixed reactions from the scientists.
- Born:
  - Jesse Owens, American athlete, four-time gold medalist at the 1936 Summer Olympics; as James Cleveland Owens, in Oakville, Alabama, United States (d. 1980)
  - Eiji Toyoda, Japanese industrialist, founder of the Toyota Motor Corporation; in Nagoya, Empire of Japan (present-day Japan) (d. 2013)
  - Gerardo de León, Filipino film director, known for films including The Moises Padilla Story, and cult movies such as Terror Is a Man, Brides of Blood, and The Mad Doctor of Blood Island; in Manila, Philippine Islands (present-day Philippines) (d. 1981)

== September 13, 1913 (Saturday) ==
- The impeachment trial of New York Governor William Sulzer began in the State Senate.
- The Bell of Chersonesos was returned by France to Russia after having been seized almost 60 years earlier during the Crimean War.
- Romanian pilot Aurel Vlaicu, who pioneered aviation in Romania, died when his airplane crashed while trying to fly across the Carpathian Mountains.
- Born:
  - Herman Goldstine, American computer scientist, helped develop the ENIAC computer; in Chicago, United States (d. 2004)
  - W. Stanford Reid, Canadian theologian, noted professor of theology for McGill University and University of Guelph; as William Stanford Reid, in Westmount, Quebec, Canada (d. 1996)
- Died: Prince George Alexandrovich Yuryevsky, Russian noble, son of Alexander II of Russia (b. 1872)

== September 14, 1913 (Sunday) ==
- The proposed route for the Lincoln Highway, which would become the first transcontinental paved highway in the United States, was announced in newspapers across the country.
- Baseball pitcher Larry Cheney of the Chicago Cubs, set a Major League record that still stands, for most hits allowed in a shutout. Although the Cubs got only 11 hits, and the New York Giants got 14, the Cubs still won 7–0.
- The Federação Bahiana de Futebol was established to manage all association football tournaments in Bahia, Brazil.
- The association football Brusquense was established in Brusque, Santa Catarina, Brazil. It was renamed Carlos Renaux in 1944.
- The Sorocaba Athletic Club was established in Sorocaba, Brazil but renamed São Bento a year later.
- Born: Jacobo Árbenz, Guatemalan state leader, 25th President of Guatemala; as Juan Jacobo Árbenz Guzmán, in Quetzaltenango, Guatemala (d. 1971)

== September 15, 1913 (Monday) ==
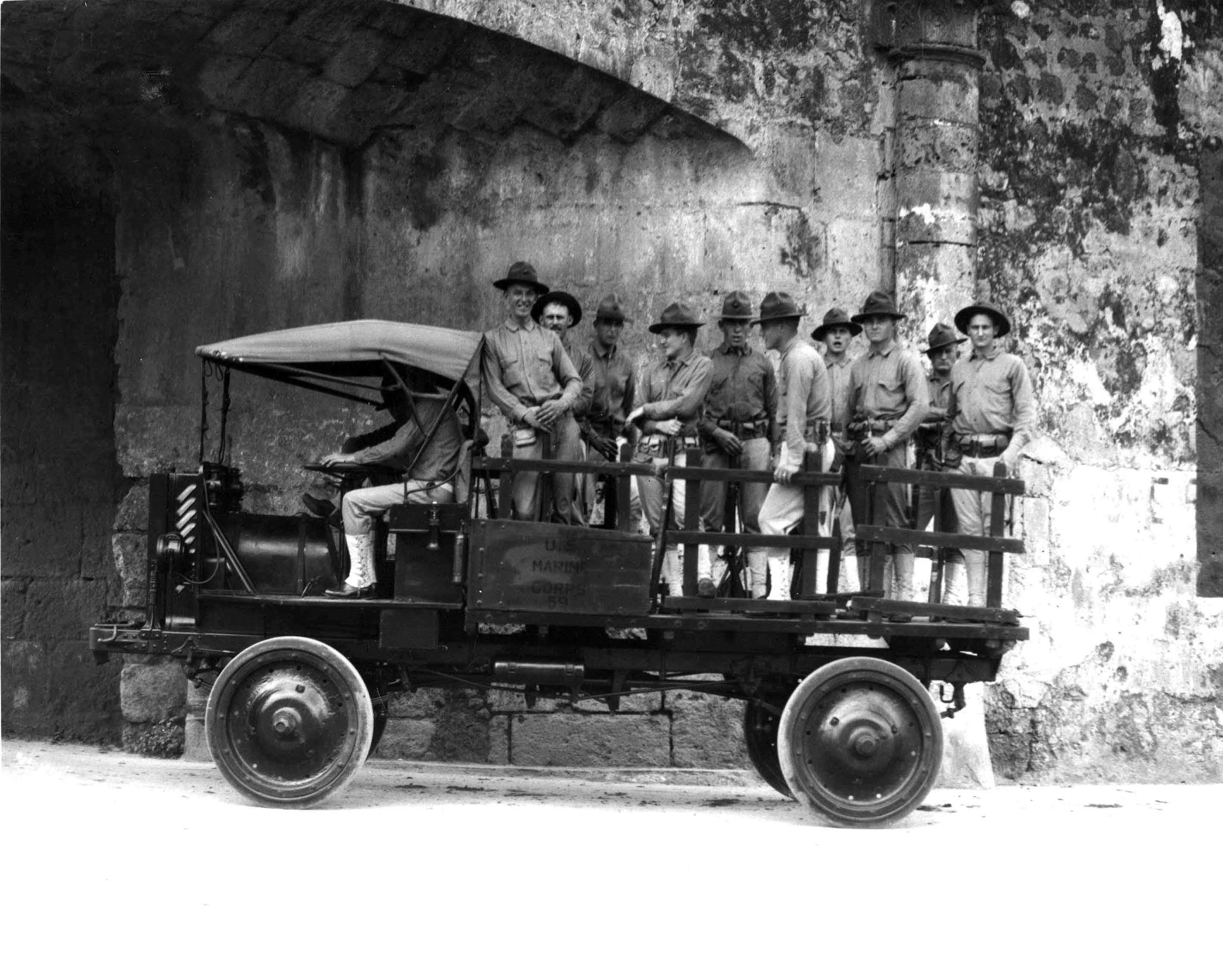
September 15, 1913: The first successful 4-wheel drive vehicle, the Jeffrey Quad, delivered to the U.S. Army (picture from 1916)

- The first successful four-wheel drive vehicle, the Jeffery Quad, was delivered to the United States Army by the Thomas B. Jeffery Company. With modifications, the Quad would become the transport vehicle of choice for the armies of France, Russia and the United States during World War One, and a civilian version would become popular following its debut in April 1914.
- Born: John N. Mitchell, American politician, 67th United States Attorney General, convicted and served time for his involvement in the Watergate scandal; in Detroit, United States (d. 1988)

== September 16, 1913 (Tuesday) ==
- In Libya, Arab tribesmen fought with the occupying Italian Army, killing 33 officers and soldiers, including their leader, General Alfonso Torelli. Another 73 Italians were wounded, and the Libyan losses were unknown.

== September 17, 1913 (Wednesday) ==
- The Anti-Defamation League was founded at a convention of the B'nai B'rith in Chicago, with Sigmund Livingston as its first president.
- Born: Ata Kandó, Hungarian-Dutch photographer, recipient of the Righteous Among the Nations for helping Jews escape The Holocaust during World War II; as Etelka Görög, in Budapest, Austria-Hungary (present-day Hungary) (d. 2017)

== September 18, 1913 (Thursday) ==
- The bill for the Federal Reserve Act was passed by the United States House of Representatives, 287 – 95, and moved on to the United States Senate. On December 19, the Senate would pass the bill 54 – 34, and the measure, creating the Federal Reserve and the Federal Reserve Board of Governors, would be signed into law by U.S. President Woodrow Wilson on December 22.
- British oil tanker Desabla was launched by Hawthorn Leslie and Company in Newcastle upon Tyne, England to serve in the Pacific and Atlantic sea routes. She was sunk by a German U-boat in 1915.

== September 19, 1913 (Friday) ==
- Mexican terrorists dynamited a railroad train, sixty miles south of Saltillo, Mexico, killing 40 soldiers and 10 second-class passengers. Reportedly, the rebels had set on the track two land mines, which were "set off by electricity."
- The first German counterpart of the renowned Salon d'Automne exhibit in Paris opened in Berlin, featuring 366 paintings by 90 artists from 12 countries including Franz Marc (The Tower of Blue Horses), with artists Guillaume Apollinaire and Filippo Tommaso Marinetti delivering accompanying lectures.
- Born: Frances Farmer, American actress, known for films including Rhythm on the Range; in Seattle, United States (d. 1970)

== September 20, 1913 (Saturday) ==
- United States Secretary of State William Jennings Bryan signed treaties in Washington, D.C., with the Foreign Ministers of Panama and Guatemala, joining El Salvador in signing the Convention for the Establishment of International Commissions of Inquiry, as a means of resolving disputes between the nations without war.
- With the Canadian exploration ship HMCS Karluk trapped in the Arctic ice, expedition leader Vilhjalmur Stefansson and a few shipmates set off on what was to be a ten-day hunt for food for the ship. Stefansson would return to find that the ice pack, and the trapped ship, had floated away.
- The foundation stone for the Goetheanum, center for the anthroposophical movement founded by Rudolf Steiner, was set at the building site in the Switzerland town of Dornach, though construction would not be finished for another nine years.
- Francis Ouimet, a 20-year-old American amateur, won the U.S. Open in a three-way playoff against five time British Open winner Harry Vardon and defending British Open champion Ted Ray. At the end of the regulation four rounds, all three had scores of 304 on 72 holes. In a major upset, the relatively unknown Ouimet scored a 72, compared to Vardon's 77 and Ray's 78 in the playoff.
- The association football club Guarany was established in Cruz Alta, Rio Grande do Sul, Brazil.

== September 21, 1913 (Sunday) ==
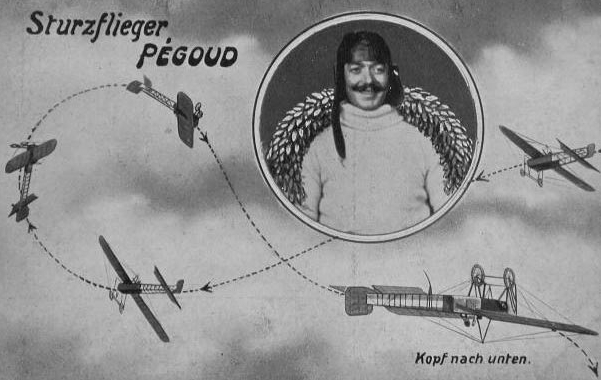
Aviator Adolphe Pegoud

- Twelve days after Pyotr Nesterov's September 9 loop at Kiev, Adolphe Pégoud duplicated the feat. Because Nesterov's "misuse" of an airplane was not mentioned in the Russian press, Pégoud was reported to have been the first person to perform the aerial maneuver of flying an airplane in a vertical circle and inspired pilots worldwide to try similar stunts.

== September 22, 1913 (Monday) ==
- The Philadelphia Athletics clinched the American League baseball title, after beating the Detroit Tigers in a doubleheader, 4-0 and 1–0, with a 12-game lead over the Cleveland Naps and only 11 games left in the season.
- The film Ivanhoe, starring King Baggot in the title role and directed by Herbert Brenon, was released in the United States by Universal Pictures.
- The play Seven Keys to Baldpate by George M. Cohan premiered at the Astor Theatre in New York City for a run of 320 performances.
- Born: Lillian Chestney, American comic book artist, known for her comic adaptations of Arabian Nights and Gulliver's Travels; in New York City, United States (d. 2000)

== September 23, 1913 (Tuesday) ==
- Roland Garros made an unprecedented airplane trip across the sea, crossing the Mediterranean from Fréjus, France, and landing in Bizerte, Tunisia, on a 558-mile (898 km) flight of slightly less than eight hours. Garros took off at 5:27 in the morning and, though a cylinder head on the airplane motor broke in mid-flight, avoided landing on the islands of Corsica or Sardinia. With "barely 5 liters of fuel left— enough for only a few more minutes of flying," Garros sighted the French naval base at Tunisia and landed at the parade ground.
- Albanian nationalist Isa Boletini led a revolt in Serbian-occupied Macedonia, with 6,000 fighters taking control of the western Macedonian towns of Debar and Ohrid, which would revert to Yugoslavian control after World War I.
- Born: Carl-Henning Pedersen, Danish painter, member of the COBRA movement; in Copenhagen, Netherlands (d. 2007)
- Died: Patrick Ford, Irish-American newspaper publisher and editor of The Irish World (b. 1837)

== September 24, 1913 (Wednesday) ==
- At Melun, French airman Albert Moreau demonstrated the first airplane with an automatic pilot, winning a prize for the design for stability control. Moreau, taking a brave passenger with him, "flew 17 miles without touching the controls of the machine." "Throughout the flight," the New York Times wrote, "even when the machine banked over and rolled so much that the passenger asked him to take the controls, Moreau sat calmly, with his arms folded, and the machine always righted itself."
- A delegation of 500 Protestants in northern Ireland met in Belfast to organize resistance to the proposed Home Rule law, and pledged to resist any decrees made by an Irish Parliament.
- Philanthropist George Coupland dedicated a new hospital in Gainsborough, Lincolnshire, England in memory of his father John Coupland. The hospital would become known for treating wounded Allied soldiers during World War I.
- The organ composition Introduction, Passacaglia and Fugue by German composer Max Reger was first performed by organist Karl Straube in Breslau, Germany.
- Born: Wilson Rawls, American children's writer, author of Where the Red Fern Grows and Summer of the Monkeys, in Scraper, Oklahoma (d. 1984); Herb Jeffries, American singer and actor, known for film roles in Harlem on the Prairie and The Bronze Buckaroo; in Detroit, United States (d. 2014)

== September 25, 1913 (Thursday) ==
- Baltimore, Maryland became the first U.S. city to have an ordinance "requiring the use of separate blocks for residences by white and colored people respectively," with a law going into effect creating separate zones for Whites and African-Americans to live. Three previous attempts to segregate Baltimore, with the original plan being to force people to leave their homes, had been struck down as unconstitutional by the Maryland appellate courts; the 1913 ordinance would be deemed acceptable because it only applied to people moving to an area after the law took effect. Similar ordinances to prohibit people from different races from living on the same city block, would soon be enacted in other Southern cities, including Atlanta, St. Louis and Birmingham, Alabama.
- Stage actor Charlie Chaplin began his movie career, signing a one-year contract with Keystone Studios for a salary of $150 per week.
- The Greenbrier resort opened near White Sulphur Springs, West Virginia. It was added to the National Register of Historic Places in 1974.
- Born:
  - Charles Helou, Lebanese state leader, 15th President of Lebanon; in Beirut, Ottoman Empire (present-day Lebanon) (d. 2001)
  - Josef Bican, Austrian-Czech association football player, striker for the Austria and Czechoslovakia national football teams from 1933 to 1949, second-highest goal scorer ever after Erwin Helmchen; in Vienna, Austria-Hungary (present-day Austria) (d. 2001)
  - Kenneth Mackenzie, Australian poet and novelist, author of The Young Desire It and The Refuge; in Pinjarra, Western Australia, Australia (drowning accident, 1955)
  - Norman O. Brown, American academic, best known for his research into the classics, author of Life Against Death and Love's Body; in El Oro, Mexico (d. 2002)
  - Maria Tănase, Romanian singer, known for her traditional Romanian, opera and contemporary song hits, in Bucharest, Kingdom of Romania (present-day Romania) (d. 1963)
- Died: Seaborn Roddenbery, American politician, U.S. Representative for Georgia, campaigned for a constitutional amendment to outlaw interracial marriages throughout the United States (b. 1870)

== September 26, 1913 (Friday) ==
- A tugboat became the first vessel to pass through the locks of the Panama Canal, sailing from the Atlantic Ocean and arriving at the Gatun Lake after being raised to the lake's level through three chambers. The old tugboat was, appropriately, named the Gatún.
- Japan sent a three-day ultimatum to China, demanding reparations and an apology for the deaths of more Japanese citizens in Nanjing and for "insults to the flag". General Chang Hsun, commander of government troops at Nanjing, apologized two days later, appearing before the Japanese consulate "accompanied by a bodyguard of 800 men".
- Born: Terence Patrick O'Sullivan, British engineer, founder of T. P. O'Sullivan and Partners which were involved in many industrial projects for Asia and Africa as well as the modernization of the British railway system in 1955, in London (d. 1970)
- Died: H. G. Pélissier, British comedian, member of the comedic troupe Pelissier's Follies (b. 1874)

== September 27, 1913 (Saturday) ==
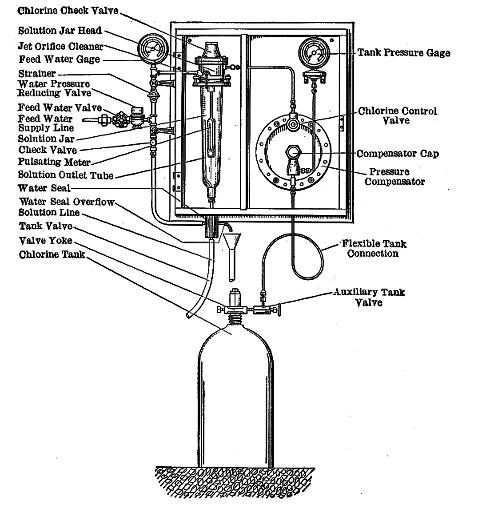
The chlorinator

- Philadelphia became the first American city to implement the use of chlorine for disenfection of its drinking water, a process that would become the standard in the United States by 1941.
- Around 12,000 men marched in a parade to protest Irish Home Rule in Ulster, Ireland.
- Some 65 Syndicalist organizations from Europe and Latin America met in Holborn, London to discuss and create an international body representing radical labor interests.
- Baseball's New York Giants captured the National League pennant, despite losing 4–0 to the Brooklyn Dodgers, because the second place Philadelphia Phillies lost as well. As The New York Times put it, "The Phillies may now win all of their remaining games and the Giants lose all of theirs and the New Yorks will be victors by one full game. Hurrah!"
- Born:
  - Albert Ellis, American psychologist, credited for developing rational emotive behavior therapy; in Pittsburgh, United States (d. 2007)
  - Charlotte Thompson Reid, American politician, U.S. Representative for Illinois from 1963 to 1971; as Charlotte Leota Thompson, in Kankakee, Illinois, United States (d. 2007)

== September 28, 1913 (Sunday) ==
- General Félix Díaz was nominated as the Labor Party's candidate for President of Mexico in the upcoming October 26 elections.
- Born:
  - Alice Marble, American tennis player, winner of 18 Grand Slam titles; in Beckwourth, California, United States (d. 1990)
  - Warja Lavater, Swiss artist, known for her work on illustrations for fairy tales for children's book, and key logo designs for Swiss companies; in Winterthur, Switzerland (d. 2007)
  - Richard M. Bohart, American biologist, leading researcher in entomology especially for flies and wasps, in Palo Alto, California, United States (d. 2007)

== September 29, 1913 (Monday) ==
- The Ottoman Empire and Bulgaria signed the Treaty of Constantinople, ending the last dispute in the Second Balkan War. That day, Bulgaria released its casualty reports for the First and Second Balkan Wars, announcing that 44,892 of its soldiers had been killed, and another 104,586 wounded.
- Maurice Prévost of France set a new speed record, traveling 125 miles per hour (201 km/h) in an airplane at the International Aeroplane Cup race at Reims.
- Sir Thomas Bowater was elected as Lord Mayor of London.

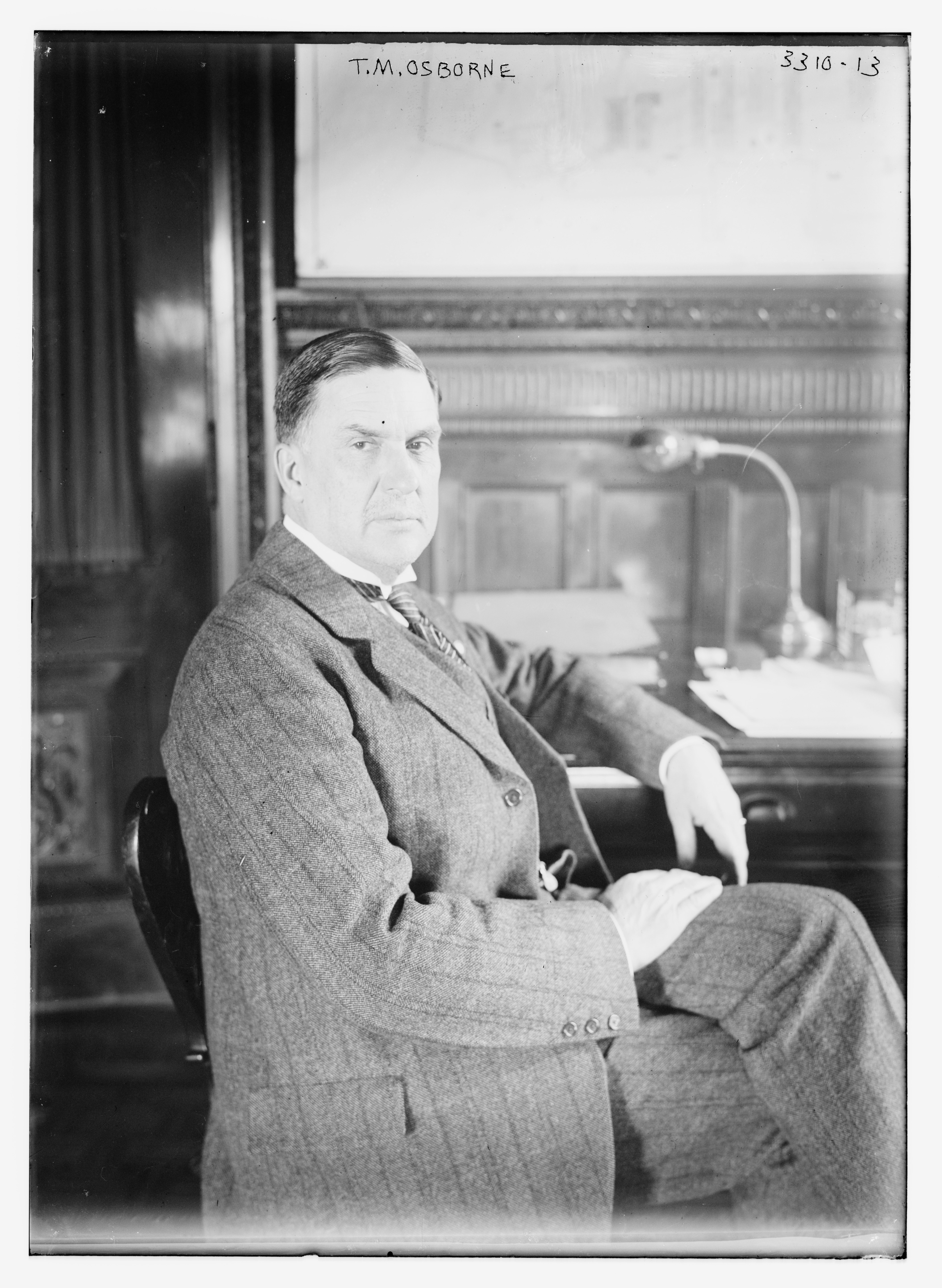
Commissioner Osborne, also known as inmate Tom Brown

- Thomas Mott Osborne, the Chairman of New York's State Commission on Prison Reform, began his personal investigation of prison conditions by spending a week as prisoner "Tom Brown" at the Auburn State Prison. At a chapel service the day before, Osborne and Auburn's warden informed the prisoners of what he was doing but did not let the guards know. After witnessing conditions from the inside for a week, Osborne recommended immediate reforms.
- Rudolf Diesel, the German engineer who invented the diesel engine, was last seen alive after retiring to his cabin on the passenger steamer SS Dresden. He was found missing the next day; his cabin bed had not been slept in and his hat and neatly folded overcoat were discovered beneath the afterdeck railing. His body would be found in the ocean on October 10.
- Born:
  - Trevor Howard, British actor, known for roles in Brief Encounter and The Third Man; as Trevor Howard-Smith, in Bushey, Hertfordshire, England (d. 1988)
  - Stanley Kramer, American film director and producer, known for films including High Noon, Inherit the Wind, and Guess Who's Coming to Dinner; in New York City, United States (d. 2001)
  - Frank Neuhauser, American lawyer, first National Spelling Bee champion; in Louisville, Kentucky, United States (d. 2011)
  - Silvio Piola, Italian association football player, striker for the Italy national football team from 1935 to 1952, 1938 World Cup champion, highest ever goalscorer in Italy's Serie A; in Robbio, Kingdom of Italy (present-day Italy) (d. 1996)
  - Dennis Sandole, American jazz musician, best known as mentor to John Coltrane; as Dionigi Sandoli, in Philadelphia, United States (d. 2000)
- Died: John F. Lacey, American politician, U.S. Representative from Iowa from 1889 to 1907, author of the Lacey Acts of 1900 and 1907 (b. 1841)

== September 30, 1913 (Tuesday) ==
- The United Kingdom withdrew its support for the five-nation banking loan to China for railroad construction.
- All 54 passengers and crew of the British freighter Templemore were rescued after a wireless distress call was sent from the ship, sinking in the mid-Atlantic. The ship Arcadia received the signal and carried out the evacuation.
- The Lorraine was launched by Arsenal de Lorient as the third of three battleships in her class to serve in the Mediterranean Sea during World War I. She would also serve in World War II before being decommissioned in 1953.
- The first classes were held at the new State Normal School in Minot, North Dakota. The institution is now Minot State University.
- The Görlitz Department Store opened to shoppers in Görlitz, Germany. It remains the best preserved of the city's department stores.
- Born:
  - Bill Walsh, American film producer, known for his live-action Walt Disney films including The Absent-Minded Professor and Mary Poppins; as William Walsh, in New York City, United States (d. 1975)
  - Cholly Atkins, American choreographer, known for choreography for many of the Motown artists; as Charles Sylvan Atkinson, in Pratt City, Alabama, United States (d. 2003)
  - Robert Nisbet, American conservative sociologist, known for his research into individualism and community, author of The Quest for Community; in Los Angeles, United States (d. 1996)
  - Samuel Eilenberg, Polish-American mathematician, co-developer of category theory; in Warsaw, Russian Empire (present-day Poland) (d. 1998)
- Died: Reginald Heber Fitz, American physician, credited for describing appendicitis and its treatment (b. 1843)
