= Alfonso Torelli =

Alfonso Torelli (11 November 1856 – 16 September 1913) was an Italian General who was killed in a battle against Libyan resistance forces.

Born in Apricena, in the province of Foggia. He first attended the College of Nobles in Naples, and then admitted to the military academy in Turin in 1875, becoming a sublieutenant of artillery in 1878. By 1887, he was a captain in the expedition of the aged General San Marzano in the East African war in Eritrea; this conflict had been reanimated after the defeat at Battle of Dogali. In 1888, he was awarded a silver medal for extinguishing fires set in the town of Massawa. He returned to teach at the Military Academy of Modena, rising to the level of coronel in 1904. In 1911, he was named major general of the Bologna brigade. They were deployed in 1913 to Libya (to the Italians, Cirenaica). In the period after the Italo-Turkish War, the Italians began to consolidate their control over non-coastal areas battling the local inhabitants. Alfonso led in mid-April 1913 some battles around Bengazi, including a successful assault on a summit in Regima, obtaining a second silver medal. He then led his units to battle the Libyan resistance forces in Tacnis, but in 16 September, he was killed in battle. He was awarded a posthumous gold medal in 1914
