= September 1913 (poem) =

Poem by W. B. Yeats

"September 1913" is a poem by W. B. Yeats, written in 1913. It was composed in response to the Hugh Lane controversy, where William Martin Murphy and others opposed building an art gallery in Dublin for housing the Lane Bequest paintings. Although the poem was not originally related to the Dublin lock-out that began in August 1913, it later became associated with the event. The poem laments the decline of cultural nationalism in Ireland.

== Title changes ==
The poem was initially published in The Irish Times on 8 September 1913, under the title "Romance in Ireland (On reading much of the correspondence against the Art Gallery)". It was later included in the pamphlet Nine Poems and the collection Responsibilities (both 1914) as "Romantic Ireland". The poem has been known by its current title only since the collection's 1916 edition.

== Historical background ==
Hugh Lane offered his collection of paintings to the city of Dublin, provided that a municipal gallery was built to house them. However, significant opposition, led by William Martin Murphy, a prominent member of the Dublin Corporation and the owner of the Irish Independent, arose against the plan. The opposition was primarily on cultural, rather than financial, grounds; in a note, Yeats wrote that one member of the opposition "compared the pictures to a Troy horse" and labelled the supporters of the gallery as "self-seekers, self-advertisers, picture dealers, log-rolling cranks, and faddists". Ultimately, the Dublin Corporation voted against funding the gallery, and after the death of Lane aboard the RMS Lusitania in 1915, the paintings were given to the National Gallery instead. Yeats viewed the public opposition as displaying the complacency and the ignorance of the emerging middle classes in Dublin, the "minds without culture".

== Poem ==
What need you, being come to sense,
But fumble in a greasy till
And add the halfpence to the pence
And prayer to shivering prayer, until
You have dried the marrow from the bone;
For men were born to pray and save;
Romantic Ireland's dead and gone,
It's with O'Leary in the grave.

Yet they were of a different kind,
The names that stilled your childish play,
They have gone about the world like wind,
But little time had they to pray
For whom the hangman's rope was spun,
And what, God help us, could they save?
Romantic Ireland's dead and gone,
It's with O'Leary in the grave.

Was it for this the wild geese spread
The grey wing upon every tide;
For this that all that blood was shed,
For this Edward Fitzgerald died,
And Robert Emmet and Wolfe Tone,
All that delirium of the brave?
Romantic Ireland's dead and gone,
It's with O'Leary in the grave.

Yet could we turn the years again,
And call those exiles as they were
In all their loneliness and pain,
You'd cry 'Some woman's yellow hair
Has maddened every mother's son':
They weighed so lightly what they gave.
But let them be, they're dead and gone,
They're with O'Leary in the grave.

== Structure and style ==
The poem features an eight-line stanza with an ABABCDCD rhyme scheme. Yeats aimed to "make the language coincide with that of passionate, normal speech", moving away from his former style filled with archaic diction and metrical substitutions.

The poem is written in ballad form, heavily influenced by Thomas Davis's "The Green above the Red" and the street song "By Memory Inspired".

== Key themes ==
The poem focuses on manifesting Yeats's new stance of exploring his political mind and celebrating those who he believes are worthy of praise. Notably, in all four of the refrains, Yeats mentions John O'Leary, who was an Irish separatist "of a different kind". O'Leary's political stance was much less self-interested than many of his contemporaries, as he instead focused on getting the greatest good for Ireland. It is clear through the poem that Yeats admires this and wishes for a return to the less egotistical and self-driven politics of a bygone era. Yeats does, however, appear to question whether these great historical figures, whom he admired and previously emulated in the style of his earlier work, are comprehensive in their understanding of the world in which they lived.

"September 1913" functions also as an iconic example of Yeats's own fidelity to the literary traditions of the 19th century British Romantic poets. A devoted reader of both William Blake and Percy Shelley, Yeats's repetition of the phrase "Romantic Ireland" connects the politically motivated ideals of the Romantics "to an Irish national landscape." The fact that Yeats attaches a second repetition of "It's with O'Leary in the grave" indicates further the speaker's belief that John O'Leary embodied a nationalism in his political actions that now rests solely within the poem. Indeed, John O'Leary "directed Yeats not just to large-mindedness, but to a way of combining Romanticism with Irishness into an original synthesis." In other words, O'Leary's influence on Yeats enables the poet to both inherit the literary legacy of the Romantics while carrying on the nationalistic vision of O'Leary. As a result, the romantic idealism found in Blake and Shelley is now transformed into a fundamentally Irish concept whereas Yeats's deep Irish heritage becomes Romantic in every sense of the word. "September 1913" thus illustrates that "Romantic Ireland is not dead after all; rather, it lives on in the remarkable voice uttering the poem, the voice of O'Leary's greatest disciple, fully of hybridity and passion at once." In a matter of four stanzas, the poem's speaker manages to exist at the confluence of British Romanticism and Irish nationalism.

Yeats's endorsement of the Romantic imagination in "September 1913" is also used to identify several of its flaws that are in need of his revision. Writing at the nexus of the Romantic and Irish traditions "enabled him to correct flaws not only of Shelley but also of Blake, who he thought should have been more rooted and less obscure." Now that "Romantic Ireland's dead and gone," it can no longer express its will and thus requires Yeats poetic prowess to clarify Ireland's message. Speaking specifically about Irish leaders such as Edward Fitzgerald, Robert Emmet and Wolfe Tone, Yeats describes them as brave yet a bit delirious, a classification that treats the poet as far more grounded in his politics than the Irish nationalists who died. Yeats channels the fervor of their idealism and struggle through his words by insisting that his own poem continues the nationalist project initiated by those who came before him. The speaker's voice thus becomes "the characteristic note of Yeats's great mature poetry."
