= Ben Gascoigne =

New Zealand–Australian astronomer (1915–2010)

Ben Gascoigne AO
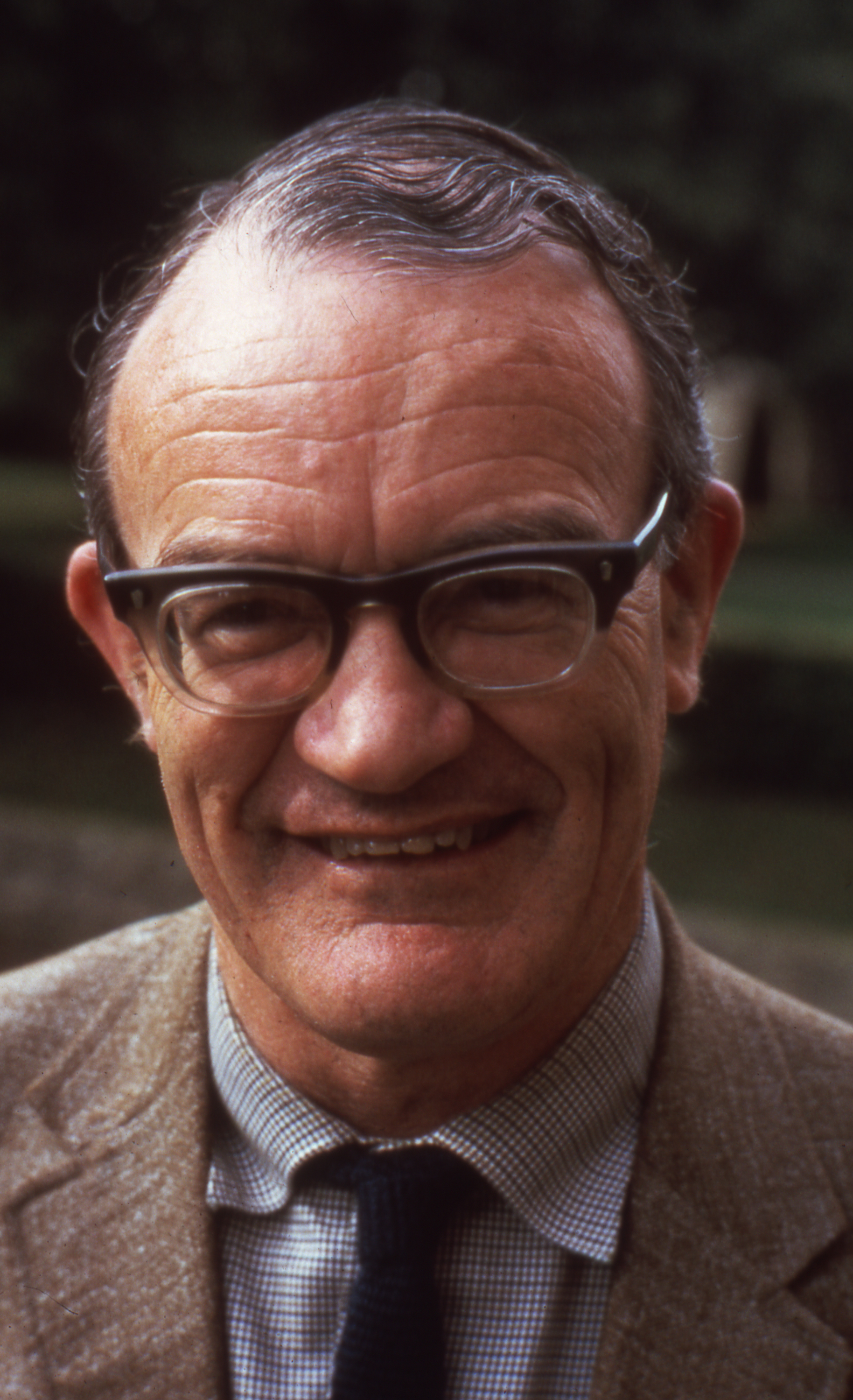
- Gascoigne in 1970
- Born: 11 November 1915; Napier, New Zealand
- Died: 25 March 2010 (aged 94); Canberra, Australia
- Education: Auckland University College
- Known for: Photometry of variable stars; correction of telescope lenses to assist wide-field photography
- Spouse: Rosalie Gascoigne (m. 1943; died 1999)
- Awards: Officer of the Order of Australia
- Scientific career
- Fields: Astronomy
- Workplaces: Australian National University

Sidney Charles Bartholemew "Ben" Gascoigne AO (11 November 1915 – 25 March 2010) was a New Zealand-born optical astronomer and expert in photometry who played a leading role in the design and commissioning of Australia's largest optical telescope, the Anglo-Australian Telescope, which for a time was one of the world's most important astronomical facilities. Born in Napier, New Zealand, Gascoigne trained in Auckland and at the University of Bristol, before moving to Australia during World War II to work at the Commonwealth Solar Observatory at Mount Stromlo in Canberra. He became skillful in the design and manufacture of optical devices such as telescope elements.

Following the war, Gascoigne and astronomer Gerald Kron used newly modernised telescopes at Mount Stromlo to determine that the distance between our galaxy and the Magellanic Cloud dwarf galaxies had been underestimated by a factor of two. Because this measurement was used to calibrate other distances in astronomy, the result effectively doubled the estimated size of the universe. They also found that star formation in the Magellanic Clouds had occurred more recently than in the Milky Way; this overturned the prevailing view that both had evolved in parallel. A major figure at Mount Stromlo Observatory, Gascoigne helped it develop from a solar observatory to a centre of stellar and galactic research, and was instrumental in the creation of its field observatory in northern New South Wales, Siding Spring Observatory. When the British and Australian governments agreed to jointly build the Anglo-Australian Telescope at Siding Spring, Gascoigne was involved from its initial conception and throughout its lengthy commissioning, taking its first photograph. Gascoigne was made an Officer of the Order of Australia for his contributions to astronomy and to the Anglo-Australian Telescope.

Gascoigne and his wife, artist Rosalie Gascoigne, had three children. After he retired, Gascoigne wrote several works on Australian astronomical history. He acted as Rosalie's photographer and assistant, using his technical skills to make her artworks resilient for public display.

== Early life ==
Gascoigne's parents met and married in Levin, New Zealand, just before the First World War. They soon moved to Napier, where Gascoigne was born in 1915. He attended Auckland Grammar School, and won a scholarship to Auckland University College (now the University of Auckland) a year before he was due to finish high school. Faced with a choice between studying history or the sciences, he chose the latter because he had a severe stammer and thought that it would be less of an impediment. He completed both a Bachelor's degree and a Master's qualification in science, securing Honours in both mathematics and physics, finishing his studies in 1937. Despite these achievements, he did not consider himself to be practically trained, saying: "I was still very much a theorist, with no practical physics at all. The professor in Auckland used to wince when I walked past the cupboard in which the good instruments were kept!"

In 1933, while studying at the university, he met his future wife Rosalie Norah King Walker, although they did not marry for another decade. Rosalie completed a Bachelor of Arts while Gascoigne was studying in Auckland; she also studied at Auckland's teacher training college while he was in Bristol.

I picked up many odds and ends about optics...all sorts of ways of testing mirrors and many optical devices. I think those things, which came by the way, were just as important as my thesis.

— Ben Gascoigne, Australian Academy of Science interview

Although Gascoigne had always intended to study mathematics at Cambridge, an event occurred that significantly shaped his career. In 1931, (Note: Gascoigne incorrectly gives a date of 1928 in his interview with Crompton.) an earthquake in New Zealand killed Michael Hiatt Baker, a young traveller from Bristol, and his parents established a postgraduate scholarship in his memory, for study at the University of Bristol, which Gascoigne won and took up in 1938. During his thesis studies at Bristol, Gascoigne developed a diffraction theory of the Foucault test that is used for evaluating the shape of large telescope mirrors. He completed his doctorate in physics in 1941, but by then war had broken out in Europe, and he had already returned to New Zealand on the last available ship.

== War service 1940–1945 ==
Returning to a job in the physics department at Auckland, Gascoigne worked on military optics, developing gun sights and rangefinders, although he did not remain there for long. Richard van der Riet Woolley, director of the Commonwealth Solar Observatory in Canberra (now Mount Stromlo Observatory), sought out Gascoigne because his "experience in optical work [was] unique" and Gascoigne was "trained in a way that no one else in Australia has been qualified". When in 1941 Gascoigne was offered a research fellowship by Woolley, he moved to Canberra. The Solar Observatory staff had similar responsibilities to those Gascoigne had held in New Zealand. His first task was to design an anti-aircraft gun sight, and he was also involved in a range of other military optical projects. In 1944, the Melbourne Observatory, home to the Commonwealth Time Service, was closed. Gascoigne reestablished the Time Service at Mount Stromlo, using two Shortt-Synchronome clocks and astronomical observing equipment that he and his colleagues adapted; the Time Service remained at Mount Stromlo until 1968. The knowledge and experience Gascoigne gained during the war proved valuable. He was at the only facility in Australia where optical work could be done, from design and manufacture to assembly and testing. Gascoigne developed a wide range of skills and "finished up quite practical, especially with a screwdriver."

A decade after Gascoigne first met Rosalie in New Zealand, she travelled to Canberra, and on 9 January 1943 they were married. Their first son, Martin, was born in November, and their second, Thomas, was born in 1945.

== Mount Stromlo ==
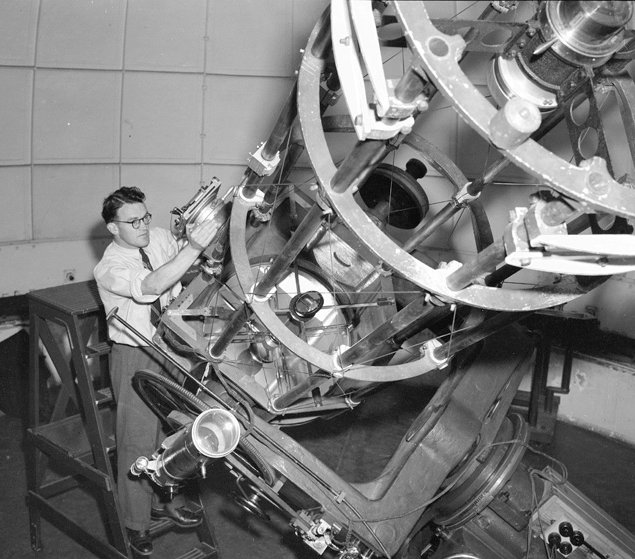
Gascoigne at the Stromlo Observatory, 1948

Following the end of the war Woolley redirected the Commonwealth Observatory from solar research towards the study of stars and galaxies. It took time to get the old and unused telescopes back up to working condition: they had to be overhauled and refurbished, and in one case rebuilt from scrap. Woolley got funding approval from the Prime Minister for construction of a 74-inch telescope, but it would not be finished for years. Gascoigne began to work in the nascent field of photoelectric photometry, using electrical devices to measure the brightness of stars more accurately than had been possible using photographic techniques. In 1951, with equipment brought by visiting astronomer Gerald Kron from California's Lick Observatory, he observed Cepheid variable stars, which are used to measure astronomical distances. Granted nine months of observing time on the Observatory's Reynolds 30-inch reflector telescope – an extraordinary opportunity – Gascoigne, Kron and others surveyed Cepheid stars in both the Small Magellanic Cloud and, later, the Large Magellanic Cloud. They also examined the colours of star clusters in the Small Cloud. The research produced remarkable results: "it meant that the Magellanic Clouds were twice as far away as was previously thought, and if then the baseline is twice as long, the size of the universe is doubled." It also showed that star formation in the Magellanic Clouds had occurred more recently than in the Milky Way. The results overturned the prevailing view that our galaxy and the Magellanic Clouds had evolved in parallel. Gascoigne said of his work:

When suddenly all this dropped into place, after I had been working away at it for quite a while, measuring more Cepheids in our own Galaxy and some in the Large Cloud, the feeling of triumph, the great feeling that I had really done something, was wonderful. I had joined the professional astronomers. Not only that, but I truly understood a problem, a proper problem...

Subsequent research confirmed what were described as pioneering results, arrived at through very innovative techniques.

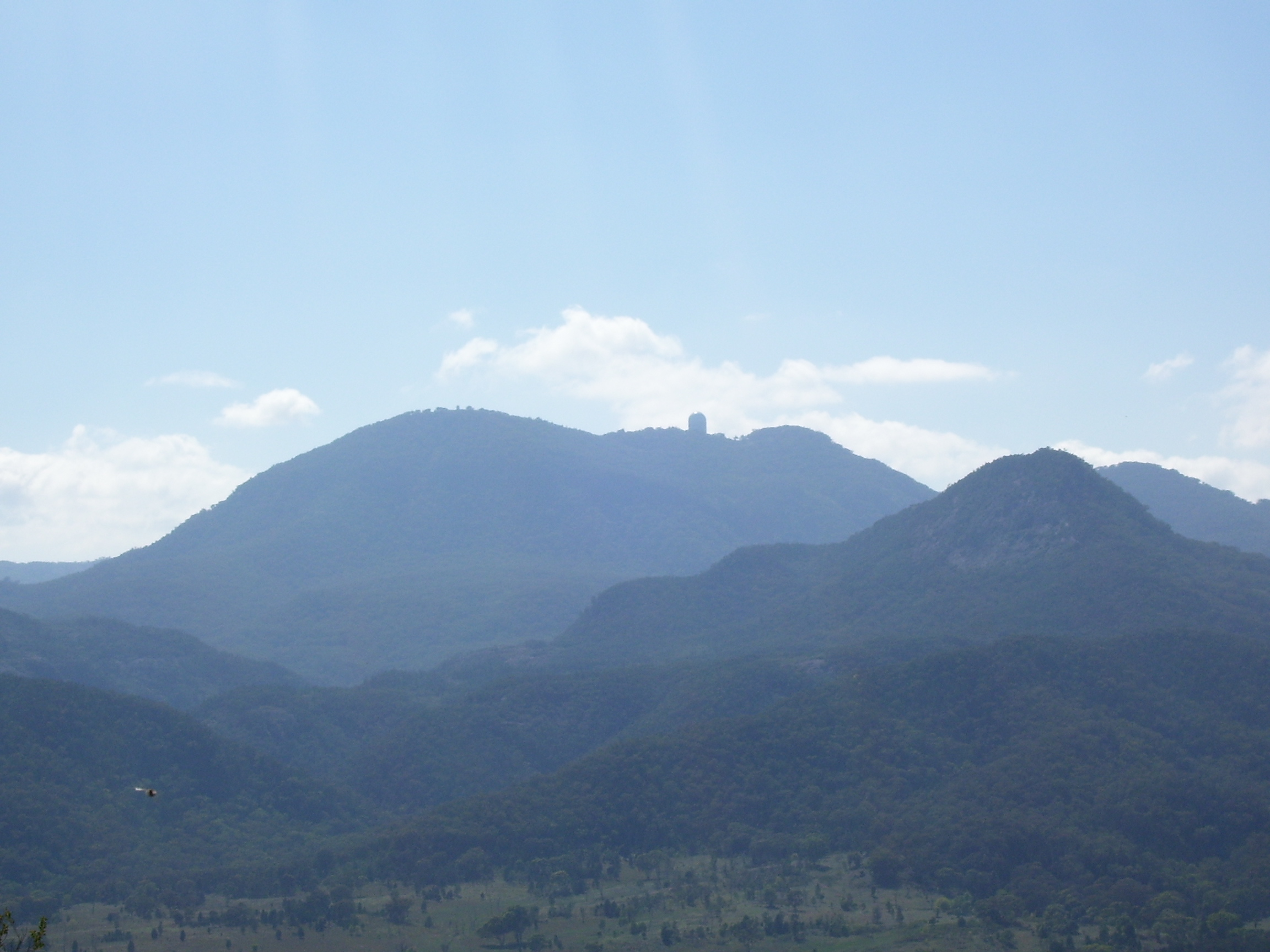
Siding Spring Mountain in the Warrumbungles. The Anglo-Australian Telescope dome is on the crest.

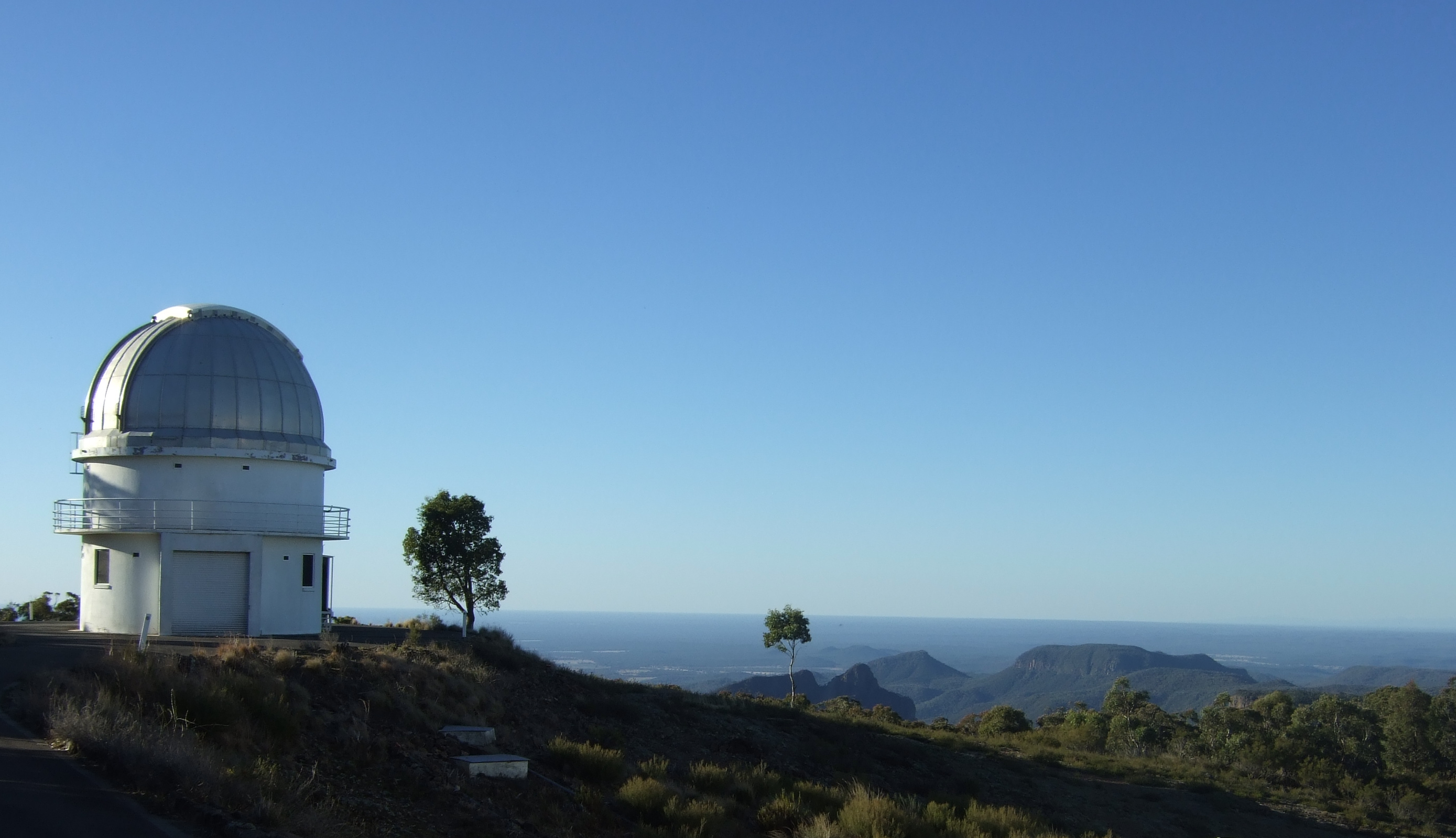
The 40-inch telescope building at Siding Spring

In 1949, the Gascoignes' third child, daughter Hester, was born. Like many Observatory personnel, the Gascoignes lived in a staff residence on Mount Stromlo, which was a long difficult trip away from Canberra. It was cold and lonely, particularly for Rosalie, but they enjoyed the outdoors, and the landscape inspired Rosalie's creativity and later her artistic career. In 1960 they relocated to Deakin in suburban Canberra, and in the late 1960s they moved to another suburb, Pearce.

In 1957, administrative responsibility for the Commonwealth Observatory was transferred from the Australian Government's Department of the Interior to the Australian National University (ANU), a move supported by both its director, Richard Woolley, and Gascoigne. This was an era of significant change at Mount Stromlo: in January 1956 Woolley had resigned as director of Mount Stromlo to take up a position as Astronomer Royal and director of the Royal Observatory Greenwich. He was replaced by Dutch-American Bart Bok, whom Gascoigne liked and under whose directorship he played a significant role. Also in 1957, the Mount Stromlo team began searching for a new field observatory site, due to the increased light pollution from Canberra's growth. The search was vigorously promoted by Bok, and after an examination of 20 possible locations, two were shortlisted: Mount Bingar, near Griffith, New South Wales, and Siding Spring, near Coonabarabran, New South Wales. Gascoigne was one of a group of scientists who visited Siding Spring Mountain as part of the search, and he was one of those who advocated this choice:

We had to climb the last bit on foot ... [I was] the first astronomer to set foot on Siding Spring. I liked the look of the place right away, partly because it had such good features for astronomy – for example, the north and west faces had sheer cliffs that were very good for draining away the cold air – and because of its beautiful outlook, on the edge of the national park. It really is a wonderful place to be.

In 1962, Siding Spring was selected, and by 1967 Siding Spring Observatory was fully operational.

At the end of Woolley's directorship, the 74-inch telescope he had initiated finally came online. Gascoigne, looking for a new research project and keen to use the new telescope, took up the study of globular clusters, compact groups of tens of thousands of ancient stars of similar age. With a new design of photometer, he was able to measure the exceptionally faint stars in these clusters. Gascoigne determined that the clusters in the Magellanic Clouds were both young and old, and had quite different characteristics to those in the Milky Way: this information was important for modelling the evolution of galaxies.

In 1963, Gascoigne developed a device, known as an optical corrector plate, which allowed wide field photography on the new 40-inch telescope at Siding Spring. Such corrector plates were subsequently used on many telescopes and became known as Gascoigne correctors. During this period he was also active in supporting the establishment of a national research organisation for astronomers, the Astronomical Society of Australia. It held its first meeting in 1966, and Gascoigne was made its first vice-president.

When Bok retired as Stromlo's director in early 1966, Gascoigne became acting director for three months until the arrival of Bok's replacement, American astronomer Olin J. Eggen. Like Bok Eggen was a productive scientist, but he was "enigmatic", "somewhat gruff" and selective in the friendships he formed. Although Eggen and Gascoigne had previously collaborated on research projects, when Eggen arrived to take up the post, he and Gascoigne did not get on well, in contrast to Gascoigne's relationships with other astronomers. Gascoigne said of Eggen: "he made it clear I had no further part in running the Observatory. I was given no information, saw no documents, attended no meetings, and was asked for no advice, not even in optical matters."

== Anglo-Australian Telescope ==
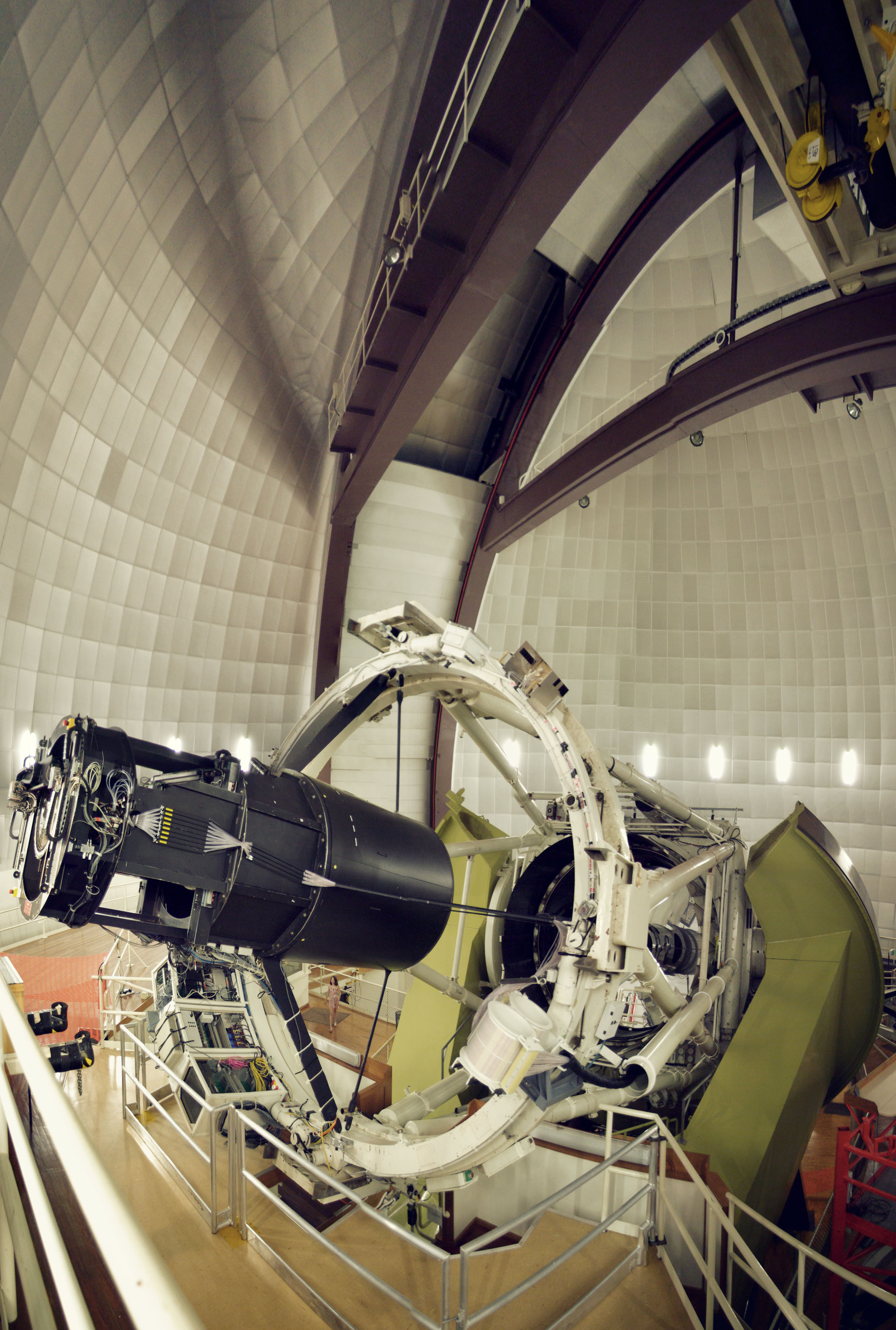
The Anglo-Australian Telescope at Siding Springs Observatory near Coonabarabran, which Gascoigne helped design and commission

In 1963 Gascoigne published an article in the journal Nature titled "Towards a Southern Commonwealth Observatory". Gascoigne was then given a significant opportunity that became the focus of the remainder of his paid academic career: to help establish one of the world's largest optical telescopes, at Siding Spring. In the early 1960s, the Australian and British governments proposed a partnership to build a joint optical telescope facility, and Gascoigne was among the experts involved. Former Mount Stromlo director and now head of the Greenwich observatory, Richard Woolley, was prominent in supporting the project from the British end. In 1967, the two governments formally agreed to collaborate on the construction of a large telescope, to be known as the Anglo-Australian Telescope (AAT). Given the existing infrastructure of the ANU's Siding Spring Observatory, the site was readily agreed as the location for the AAT. Gascoigne was one of the four members of the Technical Committee established to guide the telescope's development. He provided leadership on the design and optics of the new telescope, and was made the chief commissioning astronomer in 1974.

A bitter struggle over the management and operation of the new facility went on for some years. The Australian National University and the director at Stromlo, Olin Eggen, wanted the telescope to be under the control of the university while other Australian astronomers, including some at Stromlo, and the British wanted it established independently. Gascoigne's co-authored history of the telescope states that "None of the eight fellow of the Australian Academy of Science [Gascoigne was one of them] supported the ANU" and in 1973 the debate was resolved in favour of an independent structure, the Anglo-Australian Observatory. Gascoigne was one of only a few Stromlo employees who ended up working on the AAT for an extended period during its establishment phase: (Note: The head of the Mount Stromlo design section, mechanical engineer Herman Wehner, was full-time at the AAT during this period, working closely with Gascoigne.) the Anglo-Australian Observatory chose to offer short-term positions rather than academic tenure like that at the ANU.

The work at Siding Spring was rewarding, but it could also be dangerous. During construction, Gascoigne constantly warned colleagues to take care on the elevated catwalks around the telescope. However, Gascoigne himself was almost killed when, while working one night around the telescope structure, he fell seven metres to the floor of the observatory, narrowly missing "a massive steel structure with long protruding bolts". (Note: The location inside the AAT dome is now known as "Gascoigne's Leap".) He survived, and was the first to take a photograph using the telescope, on 26 or 27 April 1974. Gascoigne was so pleased with the quality of the optics that he said he wanted a number describing the hyperboloid shape of the mirror (1.1717) engraved on his headstone. The site quickly became one of the world's most important astronomical observatories and was for many years home to world-leading astrophotographer David Malin. The successes of the AAT have been documented in annual reports by its Board, while a 2008 analysis of the relative impacts of astronomical observing facilities placed the AAT in the top three, coming after only the Sloan Digital Sky Survey and the W. M. Keck Observatory (both telescopes built more than two decades later). For Gascoigne, it was "a wonderful thing to be associated with – the high point in my life."

It was during the period of Gascoigne's association with the Anglo-Australian telescope that he and his wife commissioned architect Theo Bischoff to design a house for them, which was planned and constructed between 1967 and 1969. Bischoff, who was responsible for numerous Canberra residences, designed a modernist home to the detailed, if contrasting, instructions from his client couple, who in turn were heavily influenced by their negative experiences with Canberra housing, particularly their home on Mount Stromlo. Based on Gascoigne's interest in optics, and Rosalie's strong visual sense as an artist, the resulting design "was based on maximising the potential for observation", creating "a form of habitable optical instrument".

== Artist's assistant and historian ==
By the middle of 1975, the Anglo-Australian Telescope was fully operational, and Gascoigne was offered a job with the new telescope, based in Sydney. By this time his wife was emerging as a significant artist who relied on the landscapes and materials around their home for her inspiration. Gascoigne decided to return to the Australian National University in Canberra; he retired a few years later in 1980, and supported Rosalie in her work.

Never, ever, did I think that I would some day say to myself, 'who else in Australia would be entrusted to attack a wonderful work like this with a six-inch circular saw?'

— Ben Gascoigne, on squaring up the panels of Rosalie's Monaro

Gascoigne completed a course in welding and became his wife's assistant, making "her assemblies of 'found objects' safer and more durable". He also catalogued and photographed her work, describing himself as "artist's handyman, cook, and archivist." Rosalie Gascoigne's artistic career came late – she was almost 60 when she held her first solo shows – and her rise was "meteoric"; five public galleries purchased works from her early exhibitions. She died in 1999. In 2008, Gascoigne donated Rosalie's final major work, a ten-panel installation titled Earth (1999), to the National Gallery of Australia.

As well as being an astronomer, Gascoigne was a scholar of the history of Australian astronomy. He wrote histories of major telescopes, such as the Melbourne Telescope and the AAT. He wrote biographies for the Australian Dictionary of Biography, including those of the first trained astronomer at Canberra's Mount Stromlo Observatory, William Bolton Rimmer, and pioneering Australian astronomer Robert Ellery.

Gascoigne died on 25 March 2010. A memorial service was held at St John's Church in Reid, Canberra, on 12 April.

== Recognition and legacy ==
Gascoigne was widely respected for his astronomical skills and his generous nature. English astronomer and writer Sir Fred Hoyle, at one time the Chairman of the AAT, gave Gascoigne considerable credit for the telescope's success, and astronomer Harry Minnett likewise credited him, together with Roderick Oliver Redman, for the telescope's extremely good optics. Former AAT director Russell Cannon regarded Gascoigne as a world leader in his field, as well as being "a delightful man". Historian of astronomy Ragbir Bhathal considered Gascoigne to have been an important figure in Australian astronomy, responsible for substantial advances in the field.

In 1966, Gascoigne was elected a fellow of the Australian Academy of Science. He was made an Honorary Fellow of the Astronomical Society of Australia; became the first person to be elected as an Honorary Member of the Optical Society of Australia; and was the first Australian to be elected as an Associate of the Royal Astronomical Society. On 11 June 1996, Gascoigne was made an Officer of the Order of Australia for his contributions to astronomy and to the AAT. On 1 January 2001, he was awarded the Centenary Medal, for his service to society and to astronomy.

== Select bibliography ==
Scientific journal articles
(Note: These journal articles are Gascoigne's five most-cited works on the Astrophysics Data System as of May 2010.)

- Kron, Gerald E.; White, Howard S.; Gascoigne, S. C. B. (1953). "Red and Infrared Magnitudes for 138 Stars Observed as Photometric Standards". The Astrophysical Journal. 118: 502. Bibcode:1953ApJ...118..502K. doi:10.1086/145778.
- Gascoigne, S. C. B.; Burr, E. J. (1956). "Surface photometry of the globular clusters 47 Tucanae and Omega Centauri". Monthly Notices of the Royal Astronomical Society. 116 (5): 570. Bibcode:1956MNRAS.116..570G. doi:10.1093/mnras/116.5.570.
- Kron, G.E.; Gascoigne, S. C. B.; White, H. S. (1957). "Red and infrared magnitudes for 282 stars with known trigonometric parallaxes". Astronomical Journal. 62: 205–220. Bibcode:1957AJ.....62..205K. doi:10.1086/107521.
- Gascoigne, S. C. B. (1966). "Colour-magnitude diagrams for nine globular-like clusters in the Magellanic Clouds". Monthly Notices of the Royal Astronomical Society. 134: 59. Bibcode:1966MNRAS.134...59G. doi:10.1093/mnras/134.1.59.
- Gascoigne, S. C. B. (1969). "Further observations of Magellanic cloud cepheids". Monthly Notices of the Royal Astronomical Society. 146: 1. Bibcode:1969MNRAS.146....1G. doi:10.1093/mnras/146.1.1.

Books

- Gascoigne, S. C. B.; Proust, Katrina M.; Robins, Malcolm Owen (1990). The creation of the Anglo-Australian Observatory. Cambridge UK: Cambridge University Press. ISBN 0-521-35396-3.
