= Kurt Gottlieb =

(1910–1995) engineer, draftsman, astronomer and Jewish community leader

- Born: 5 October 1910; Graz, Austria
- Died: 21 July 1995 (aged 84); Concord, New South Wales
- Occupations: Engineer, draftsman, astronomer and Jewish community leader

Kurt Gottlieb (5 October 1910 – 21 July 1995) was an engineer, draftsman and astronomer who, born in Austria, spent much of his life in Australia after fleeing the Nazi persecution of Jews there.

In Australia he worked as a mechanical engineer at the Mount Stromlo Observatory, which throughout World War II, was converted into an optical munitions factory. While there he developed more then eleven optical instruments for the war effort.

Additionally he was a Jewish community leader in Australia and was a founding member of the ACT Jewish Community.

== Early life ==
Gottlieb was born in Graz, a city in Austria, and was the son of Ernest and Elsa (née Gans) Gottlieb and his father worked as a shopkeeper. After completing his schooling Gottlieb qualified as an engineer at the Brno University of Technology in what is now the Czech Republic.

Shortly after completing his qualifications he fled to Italy to escape the Nazi persecution of Jews and, from there, he boarded the Esquilino heading to Australia, that was one of the last ships to leave before Italy entered World War II.

== Career in Australia ==
Gottlieb arrived in Sydney on 28 April 1940 and, discovering that his engineering qualifications would not be recognised, first trained as a draftsman at Sydney Technical College while working odd jobs. Despite this he was soon sought out for his engineering skills by Richard van der Riet Woolley, who was the then director of the Mount Stromlo Observatory, which was being transformed into an optical munitions lab and factory. In order to take the role here Gottlieb was placed into the formal custody of Woolley.

Mt Stromlo Observatory Workshop Staff, Kurt Gottlieb pictured fourth from left, c. 1940s,

With this position he relocated to the observatory, which was located near Canberra, and - in the course of his work there - developed more then eleven new optical instruments for munitions and a number of these were for the Army Inventions Directorate who he also worked for. Many of these inventions where the result of investigations made on ideas submitted by the general public and used recycled materials due to the shortages caused by the war.

After the war Gottlieb remained at Stromlo and employed as a research engineer and was in charge of the workshops. He also began working alongside Clabon Allen and, together, they designed an electron multiplier photometer, equipped with a slitless spectrograph, which was fitted to the Reynolds Telescope at the observatory in August 1947. Its addition led to improvements in being able to determine stellar photometric gradients and monochromatic magnitudes through photoelectrics.

Also in 1947 Gottlieb was able to take a photograph of Sputnik 1 on 8 October 1957 as it passed 560 miles (900 km) over Australia. This photograph was shared globally and was on the front cover of The New York Times. He would later say: '[t]hat Sputnik photograph was an easy job, yet it brought me more publicity than all my years of work.'

Another project that Gottlieb worked on was the reconstruction of the Great Melbourne Telescope which was sold and transferred to Stromlo in 1945. Much of this work took place in the 1950s and was used there for over 20 years until being rebuilt again to detect MACHOs.

In 1957, when Stromlo was formally amalgamated with the Australian National University, Gottlieb was appointed a research fellow at the school of physical sciences while continuing work at the observatory. In 1958 he was also awarded a Carnegie grant which allowed him to study in the United States and attend conferences throughout Europe.

He returned to Israel in 1967, where both of his children had volunteered for the Six-Day War, which had ended two weeks before. He returned there in between 1968 and 1970 as a visiting professor at Tel Aviv University where he helped establish the Wise Observatory.

He retired in 1976 and died on 21 July 1995 in Sydney at the Concord Repatriation General Hospital.

== Personal life ==
On 23 September 1943 Gottlieb married Isley Turner at the district registrars office in North Sydney, however, they later held a Jewish ceremony in Canberra which was the first in the city. Additionally they were founding members of the ACT Jewish Community and served in various roles within it, including Gottlieb being president during 1962–1964.

The couple had two children together, Paul and Miriam, and Isley predeceased him in 1984.
