= The Observatory (journal) =

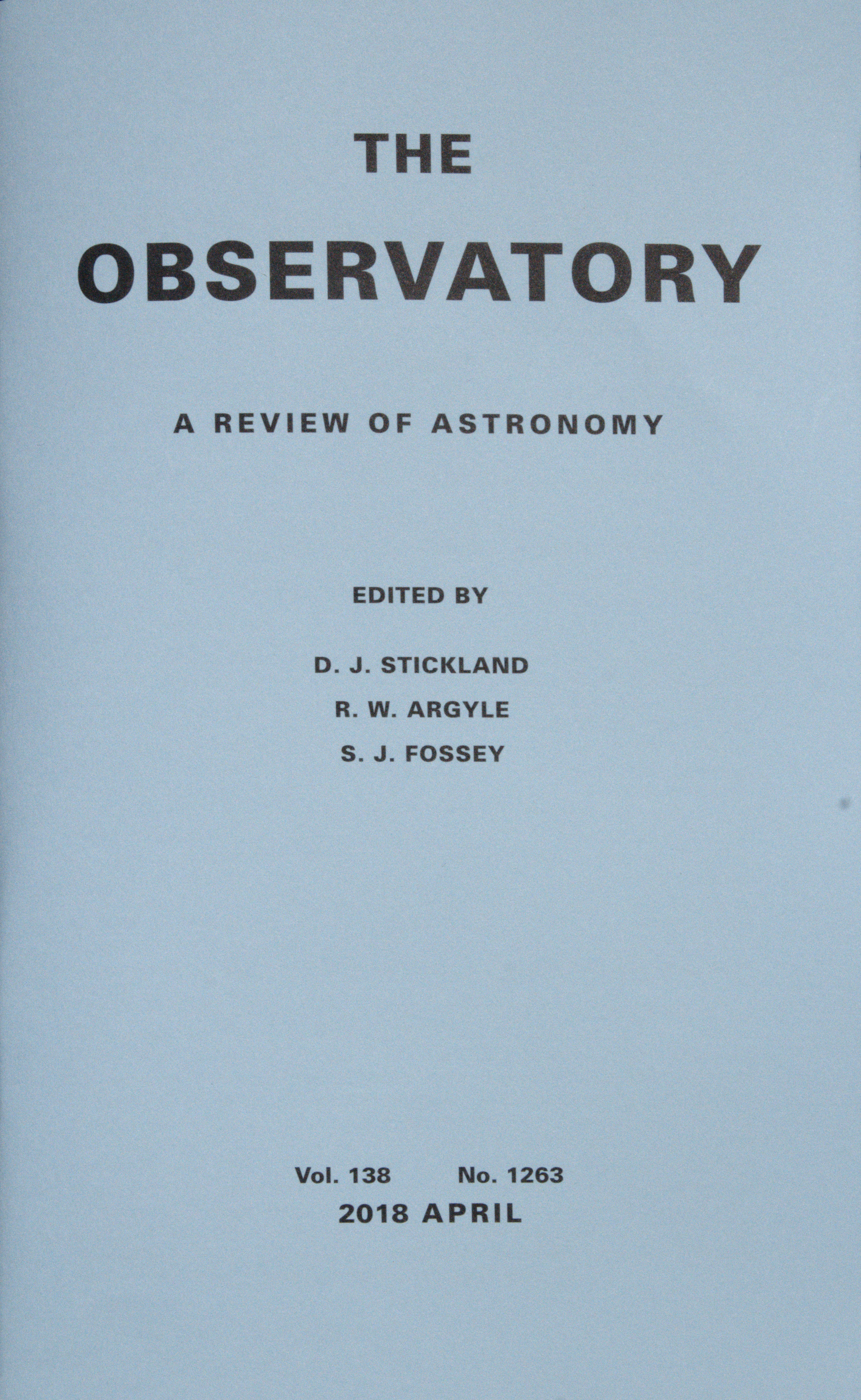
- Discipline: Astronomy
- Language: English
- Edited by: David Stickland, Bob Argyle, Steve Fossey, Phillip Helbig, and Quentin Stanley

Publication details
- History: 1877-present
- Publisher: Self published by the editors (United Kingdom)
- Frequency: Bimonthly
- Open access: yes

Standard abbreviations
- ISO 4: Observatory

Indexing
- ISSN: 0029-7704

Links
- Journal homepage

The Observatory is a publication — variously described as a journal, a magazine and a review — devoted to astronomy. It appeared regularly starting in 1877, and it is now published every two months. The current editors are David Stickland, Bob Argyle, Steve Fossey, Phillip Helbig, and Quentin Stanley.

Although it is not published by the Royal Astronomical Society, it publishes the reports of its meetings. Other features are the extensive book reviews, correspondence, thesis abstracts, obituaries, and "Here and There", a collection of misprints and ridiculous statements of astronomical interest. As of 2025, it is an open access publication.

The founder and first editor (1877–1882) was William Christie, then chief assistant at the Royal Observatory and later Astronomer Royal. Notable subsequent editors include:

- Arthur Eddington (1913–1919)
- Harold Spencer Jones (1915–1923)
- Richard van der Riet Woolley (1933–1939)
- William McCrea (1935–1937)
- Margaret Burbidge (1948–1951)
- Antony Hewish (1957–1961)
- Donald Lynden-Bell (1967–1969)
- Carole Jordan (1968–1973)
- Jocelyn Bell Burnell (1973–1976)
