= Carole Jordan =

British astronomer (1941–2026)

Dame Carole Jordan DBE FRS FRAS FInstP
- Born: 19 July 1941; Pinner, Middlesex, England
- Died: 3 February 2026 (aged 84)
- Education: University College London
- Scientific career
- Fields: Astrophysics
- Workplaces: University of Colorado Boulder; Culham Laboratory; Somerville College, Oxford; University of Oxford
- Doctoral advisor: C. W. Allen

Dame Carole Jordan (19 July 1941 – 3 February 2026) was a British physicist, astrophysicist, astronomer and academic. She was Professor Emeritus of Astrophysics at the University of Oxford and Emeritus Fellow at Somerville College, Oxford. From 1994 to 1996, she was President of the Royal Astronomical Society; she was the first woman to hold this position. She won the Gold Medal of the Royal Astronomical Society in 2005; she was only the third female recipient following Caroline Herschel in 1828 and Vera Rubin in 1996. She was head of the Rudolf Peierls Centre for Theoretical Physics at the University of Oxford from 2003 to 2004 and 2005 to 2008, and was one of the first female professors in Astronomy in Britain. She was made a Dame Commander of the Order of the British Empire in 2006 for services to physics and astronomy.

== Early life and education ==
Carole Jordan was born in Pinner, Middlesex, England on 19 July 1941. She was educated at Harrow County Grammar School for Girls and at University College London (BSc 1962; PhD 1965). Her first paper, written in 1961 while she was still an undergraduate, was on the distortion of lunar craters in the Hipparchus region of the Moon.

Her PhD studies under C. W. Allen opened up a new field in atomic physics and included identification of iron and other lines in the solar extreme ultra-violet spectrum and the ZETA experiment, early ionisation-balance calculations, development of density-diagnostic methods using the iron lines, calculation of relative element abundances and modelling from emission-measure distributions.

Her first paper on coronal research, "The Relative Abundance of Silicon Iron and Nickel in the Solar Corona", was published in 1965.

== Scientific work ==
Jordan calculated the ionisation balance of elements, including the effects of density-dependent di-electronic recombination, level populations in ions, and combined this with observational results from the Sun and stars. As a result of her work on the Skylab ultraviolet spectra the understanding of He-like ions was further developed. This had implications for the development of applications, like X-ray lasers. The electron density diagnostics, and temperature density diagnostics, when combined with the emission measure analysis developed by her yielded new insights in the chromospheres of cool stars, T Tauri stars, and the Sun, among others. The 1970 solar eclipse allowed her the identification of previously unknown forbidden lines in the Sun. Following the launch of the International Ultraviolet Explorer satellite in 1978, she turned her attention to stellar corona and chromospheric activity. Her knowledge of solar activity enabled her to help develop this new branch of astrophysics and identify many elements in stellar spectra as well. From about 1980, she was a key member of nearly every team, in the UK, Europe and the US, concerned with the development and use of instruments for the studies of ultraviolet and x-ray spectra of the Sun and of the stars.

== Career ==
- Research associate, Joint Institute for Laboratory Astrophysics, University of Colorado, Boulder, 1966.
- Assistant Lecturer, Department of Astronomy, UCL, attached to the Spectroscopy Division of UKAEA, Culham Laboratory, 1966–1969

During this time, she completed her ionisation-balance calculations and the identification of some forbidden lines and satellite lines. In 1969, she started to devise methods to obtain the structure of the solar transition region.

- Astrophysics Research Unit, Culham Laboratory:
  - Post-doctoral research assistant, 1969–1971
  - Senior Scientific Officer, 1971–1973
  - Principal Scientific Officer, 1973–1976
- Wolfson Tutorial Fellow in Natural Science, Somerville College, Oxford, 1976–?
- University of Oxford: reader in physics, 1994–1996, professor of physics 1996–?, head of the Rudolf Peierls Centre for Theoretical Physics, 2003–2008, emeritus professor 2008–2026.

She published papers on astrophysical plasma spectroscopy and structure and energy balance in cool star coronae.

Jordan has a portrait displayed with the National Portrait Gallery as a recognition of her career achievements.

== Death ==
Jordan died on 3 February 2026, at the age of 84.

== Affiliations ==
- Royal Astronomical Society: Fellow, 1966; secretary, 1981–1990; vice-president, 1990–1991 and 1996–1997; president, 1994–1996.
- Member of the International Astronomical Union, 1967
- Editor of The Observatory, 1968–1973
- Fellow of the Institute of Physics, 1973
- Fellow of the Royal Society, 1990
- Doctor of the University of Surrey, 1991
- Member of the Science and Engineering Research Council, 1985–1990 (Chairman, Solar System Committee, 1983–1986; Member, Astronomy, Space and Radio Board, 1979–1986; Member, Astronomy and Planetary Science Board, 1986–1990)
- Member of the Particle Physics and Astronomy Research Council, 1994–1997

== Damehood ==
Carole Jordan was created a Dame Commander of the Order of the British Empire (DBE) on 17 June 2006.
