= Rosalie Gascoigne =

Australian sculptor (1917–1999)

Rosalie Gascoigne AM
- Born: 25 January 1917; Auckland, New Zealand
- Died: 25 October 1999 (aged 82); Canberra, Australia
- Known for: Assemblage, sculpture
- Notable work: Earth (1999)
- Spouse: Ben Gascoigne (m. 1943)
- Awards: Exhibited, Venice Biennale 1982; Order of Australia 1994

Rosalie Norah King Gascoigne AM (née Walker; 25 January 1917 – 25 October 1999) was a New Zealand-born Australian sculptor and assemblage artist. She showed at the Venice Biennale in 1982, becoming the first female artist to represent Australia there. In 1994, she was appointed a Member of the Order of Australia for her services to the arts.

== Life ==
Gascoigne was born Rosalie Norah King Walker in Auckland, New Zealand, on 25 January 1917. She was the second of the three children of Stanley and Marion King Walker.

She received her Bachelor of Arts degree from Auckland University College in 1937.

She emigrated to Canberra, Australia, in 1943. There, she married S. C. B (Ben) Gascoigne, an astronomer whom she had met at Auckland University, and they set up home in the isolated scientific community of Mount Stromlo, where they lived for some time. They then built a family home that would accommodate Rosalie's artistic pursuits. They had a daughter named Hester.

Gascoigne was appointed a Member of the Order of Australia (AM) in June 1994, for services to art, particularly sculpture.

She died on 25 October 1999 at the John James Hospital in Canberra.

== Art ==
During the years spent raising her three children, Gascoigne found solace by making natural assemblages first via traditional flower arranging then later with the Japanese art form Sogetsu Ikebana. Her work in this medium earned praise from Japanese master and founder of the Sogetsu School of Ikebana, Sofu Teshigahara.

By the late 1960s, she had become dissatisfied with the limitations of the medium and started experimenting first with small scrap iron sculptures and later wooden boxed assemblages, all composed of materials she found during scavenging expeditions in the fierce, sunburnt landscape of Australia. While the Australian landscape was initially a shocking change from the damp green hills of her familiar New Zealand, by this time, she had come to love the "boundless space and solitude" of her new home. Much of her art reflects this, though some also harks back to her roots in New Zealand.

Most of Gascoigne's work was created in Canberra, and she obtained materials for her artworks by sifting through rubbish dumps around the city. Her first work was acquired by the National Gallery of Australia (NGA) in 1976, under inaugural director James Mollison, which caused great excitement for Gascoigne.

== Themes and influences ==
She said that her art-making materials "need to have been open to the weather." She thus used mostly found materials: wood, iron, wire, feathers, (Note: See photograph of her work of art in: Grishin, Sasha (29 November 2019). "Creating a new natural order". The Canberra Times.) and yellow and orange retro-reflective road signs; which flash and glow in the light. Some of her other best-known works use faded, once-bright drinks crates; thinly sliced yellow Schweppes boxes; ragged domestic items such as torn floral lino and patchy enamelware; vernacular building materials such as galvanised tin, corrugated iron and masonite; and fibrous, rosy cable reel ends. These objects represent, rather than accurately depict, elements of her world. "The countryside's discards .... no longer suggest themselves but evoke experiences, particularly of landscape."

Text is another important element of her work; she would cut up and rearrange the faded, naive lettering found on these items to create abstract yet evocative grids of letters and word fragments, sometimes alluding to the crosswords and poetry of which she was so fond. Knowledgeable and widely read, she was inspired amongst others by the artists Colin McCahon, Ken Whisson, Dick Watkins and Robert Rauschenberg, and the poets William Wordsworth, Peter Porter and Sylvia Plath. She also had a fondness for the pronouncements of Pablo Picasso. However gradually both colour and text seemed to fade from her work, and in her final years she created meditative, elegiac compositions of white or earth-brown panels.

Although working vigorously into her 80s, with occasional help from an assistant, her age at the height of her success precluded the travelling that would have been necessary to build the international audience her work deserved. Although she exhibited occasionally overseas—including the 1982 Venice Biennale (the first Australian woman to do so), Switzerland, and Sweden as well as throughout Asia (Japan, South Korea, and Taiwan, among others), the major holdings of her work remain in Australia and New Zealand, both of which claim her as their own. The Metropolitan Museum of Art owns one of her smaller pieces.

== Exhibitions ==
Gascoigne did not begin to exhibit her work until the age of 57. She held her first solo exhibition in 1976, and two years later was invited by the National Gallery of Victoria to have a survey exhibition..

A major exhibition of her work is being held at the NGA from 24 October 2026 to 14 February 2027.

== Major collections ==
Museum	City	Country
Art Gallery of Ballarat	Ballarat	Australia
Art Gallery of New South Wales	Sydney, New South Wales	Australia
Art Gallery of South Australia	North Terrace, Adelaide	Australia
Art Gallery of Western Australia	Perth, Western Australia	Australia
Artbank	Sydney	Australia
Geelong Art Gallery	Geelong, Victoria	Australia
Griffith University Art Gallery	Brisbane, Queensland	Australia
Latrobe Regional Gallery	Latrobe, Melbourne	Australia
Metropolitan Museum of Art	New York	United States
Museum of Contemporary Art Australia	Sydney	Australia
Museum of New Zealand Te Papa Tongarewa	Wellington	New Zealand
National Gallery of Australia	Canberra	Australia
National Gallery of Victoria	Melbourne, Victoria	Australia
Newcastle Art Gallery	Newcastle, New South Wales	Australia
Queensland Art Gallery	Brisbane, Queensland	Australia
