= Walter Geoffrey Duffield =

Australian astronomer

- Born: 12 August 1879; Gawler, South Australia
- Died: 1 August 1929 (aged 49); Canberra, Australian Capital Territory
- Occupations: Physicist and astonomer

Walter Geoffrey Duffield (12 August 1879 – 1 August 1929) was an Australian physicist and astronomer and the first director of Mount Stromlo Observatory.

== Early years and education ==
Duffield was born in Gawler, South Australia, and was the son of David Walter and Florence Evangeline (née Kirkpatrick) Duffield. He was the grandson of Walter Duffield and, as a part of a wealthy family, attended the Queen's School and then the Collegiate School of St Peter in Adelaide.

After completing his schooling he first attended the University of Adelaide where, in 1900, he completed his bachelor of science. In 1900 he won the Angas engineering scholarship and with it, entered Trinity College, Cambridge where he obtained his bachelor of arts in two years.

After completing his undergraduate studies Duffield remained in the United Kingdom for a number of years, and in 1903 worked at the National Physical Laboratory before beginning research at the Victoria University of Manchester, where his research on the effects of pressure on arc spectra between 1906 and 1907 led to him being granted a doctor of science. The results of his research were published in the Philosophical Transactions of the Royal Society in four parts between 1907 and 1910.

== Advocacy for a solar observatory ==
While completing his post graduate studies, and separate from them, Duffield attended meetings of the International Union for Cooperation in Solar Research, first in Oxford in 1905 and then in Paris in 1907. At these meetings he promoted the idea of eastern Australia establishing a solar observatory which was, at the 1905 meeting, met with little enthusiasm before gaining support at the 1907 meeting. In establishing this observatory Duffield believed that they would be able to fill a gap in observations which existed between India and the United States.

In 1908 he became secretary of a committee to forward this idea and in 1909 returned to Australia to help select a location and meet with scientists and government officials there, including the then leader of the opposition Alfred Deakin, who wrote in support after they met. Despite this they struggled to get support for the observatory and it was, perhaps, only made possible by the gift of a refractor from wealthy amateur astronomer James Oddie. He was also able to gain additional support by agreeing for it to be located in the Australian Capital Territory, at Mount Stromlo, which they selected in 1910; Duffield had originally favoured South Australia as the site. In 1911 the telescope, known as the Oddie Telescope (after its benefactor) was placed there and a building constructed to house it; the first observations were made with it on 8 September 1911.

In 1910 Duffield was appointed as a professor of physics at the University of Reading, where he undertook studies into the measurement of gravity at sea; much of his research took place during voyages to Australia in 1914 and 1923. In his 1914 visit to Australia Duffield inspected the Stromlo site and promoted further work on it. However, the outbreak of World War I, in which he served as a part of the Royal Flying Corps and the Royal Air Force from 1914 to 1919, prevented further development at this time.

== Director of the Mount Stromlo Observatory ==
On 1 January 1924 Duffield returned to Australia and was appointed the first director of what was now known as the Mount Stromlo Observatory and, in this role, helped to develop it. To celebrate it he published 'The luminosity of the night sky' in the 1928 edition of the Memoirs of the Commonwealth Solar Observatory.

Grave of Walter Duffield at Mount Stromlo Observatory, 1929 (ANUA592-105)

Duffield, who was asthmatic, died of pneumonia on 1 August 1929 at the observatory while work was still in its preliminary stages. It was a brief illness, which had been exacerbated by Stromlo being inaccessible due to heavy snowfall meaning that he could not be transported to hospital. He is buried at the observatory.

After his death William Bolton Rimmer was made director of the observatory.

== Personal life ==
Doris and Walter Duffield, 1920s (ANUA592-1)

On 9 June 1909 Duffield married Doris Tennant Boult in Glenelg, South Australia and they had three children together; Joan, Peter and Michael.

Upon their return to Australia in 1924 the family lived together at Hotel Canberra until, in 1928, a house was constructed for them at the observatory. Duffield and Doris both played together in the Stromberra Quintet, a Canberra chamber music ensemble, which they helped found. Duffield played the double bass and Doris the violin.

After Duffield's death the family remained in Canberra.

== Collections ==
Duffield's personal papers and records are held at the Adolph Basser Library at the Australian Academy of Science.
