= Mount Stromlo Observatory =

Astronomical observatory in Australia

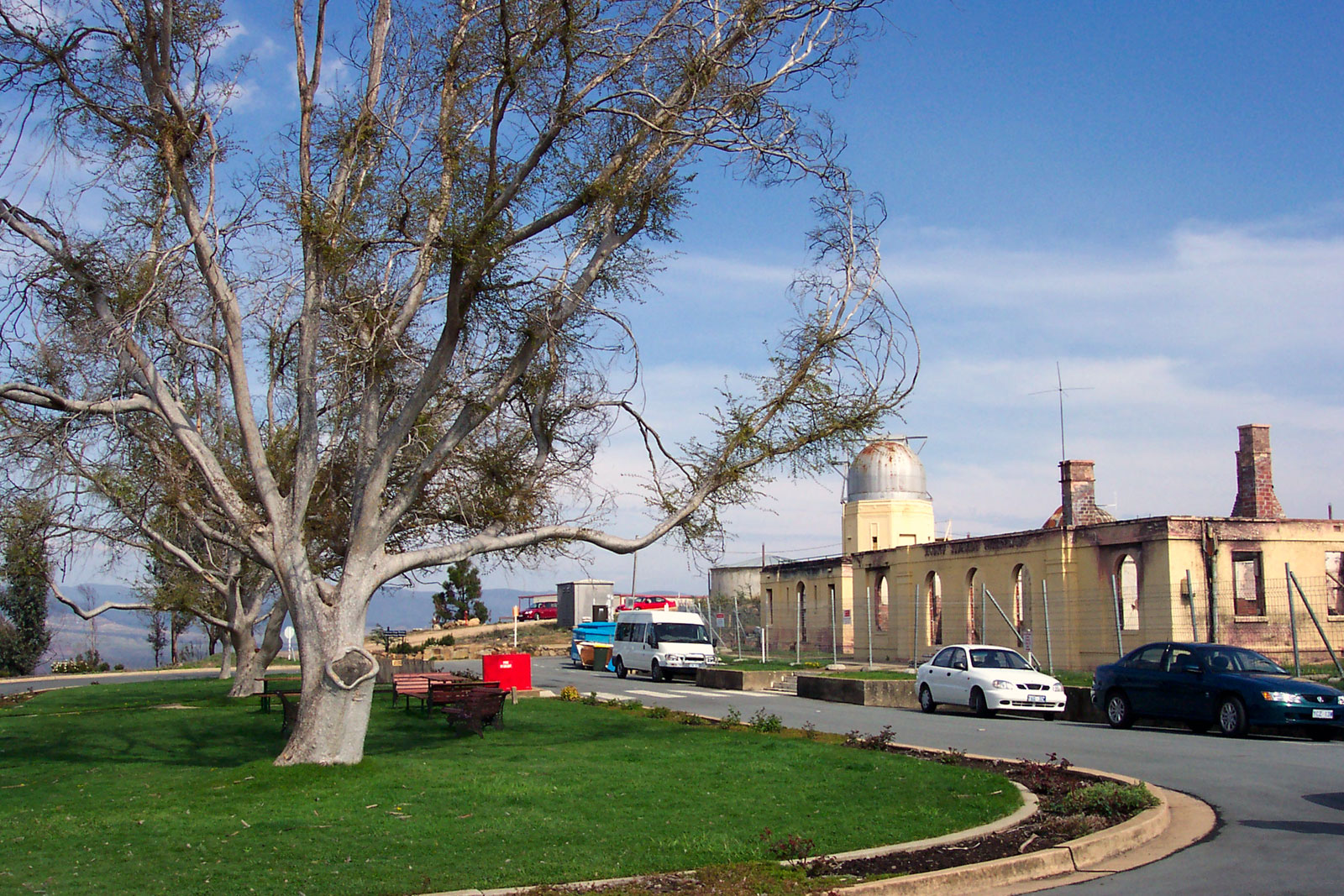
- Remains of the old administration building with the dome of the Farnham telescope
- Alternative names: MSO
- Observatory code: 414
- Location: Canberra, Australian Capital Territory, AUS
- Coordinates: 35°19′13″S 149°00′25″E
- Altitude: 770 m (2,530 ft)
- Established: 1924
- Website: rsaa.anu.edu.au/observatories/mount-stromlo-observatory
- Telescopes: 74-inch Reflector at Mount Stromlo Observatory; Great Melbourne Telescope; SkyMapper
- Related media on Commons

Mount Stromlo Observatory located in the west of Canberra, Australia, is part of the Research School of Astronomy and Astrophysics at the Australian National University (ANU). Australia's oldest telescope and several others at the observatory were destroyed by bushfire in 2003.

== Formation ==
The beginnings of advocacy for the creation of the observatory is credited to Australian born physicist and academic Walter Geoffrey Duffield, who would go on to be its first director. He first supported its creation at a 1905 meeting of the International Union for Cooperation in Solar Research in Oxford, where it gained little support, at the next meeting in 1907 he was able to obtain more support. At this time Australia did not have a solar observatory (which was Duffield's main aim) and he believed that, in building one, they could fill a gap of observations which existed between India and the United States.

In 1908 Duffield became the secretary of a committee established by the British Association for the Advancement of Science to promote its creation and lobby governments and scientists in Australia. Some of the politicians that acted in support were Alfred Deakin and Hugh Mahon. As a part of this Duffield was also instrumental in selecting the site of Mount Stromlo in 1910 and the building of the first observatory there in 1911. Also in In 1911 a delegation for an Australian Solar Observatory went to London seeking Commonwealth assistance.

Additional advocacy for the project came from Mary Proctor, a British-American populariser of astronomy, who between October 1912 and February 1914, completed a public lecture tour throughout both Australia and New Zealand to promote it at the request of Duffield. Through this tour she also raise hundreds of pounds for the work and met with numerous government officials and the New Zealand Governor General.

== Early development ==
Construction of the Oddie Dome, September 1911, Mount Stromlo

Postcard advertising the Commonwealth Solar Observatory, 1920s

The 1911 dome built to house the Oddie Telescope was the first Commonwealth building constructed in the newly established Australian Capital Territory. The first telescope was created using a donation of a refractor gifted by wealthy amateur astronomer James Oddie and, in his honour, it was named the Oddie Telescope.

Due to interruptions caused by World War I the observatory was not opened until 1924, and it was named the Commonwealth Solar Observatory, and Duffield was its director until his death in 1929. He was assisted by William Bolton Rimmer, a British astronomer and the only qualified astronomer on staff, who became assistant solar observer and deputy director and who would become officer in charge after Duffield's death. Rimmer oversaw significant development at the site, including the construction of a solar tower and the Reynolds Telescope as well as the acquisition of a spectrohelioscope and spectroheliograph.

== World War II ==
Mt Stromlo Observatory workshop staff, Kurt Gottlieb pictured fourth from left, 1940s,

Optical munitions team, Mount Stromlo Observatory, c. 1940s

Initially the observatory focused on solar and atmospheric observations but this shifted rapidly during World War II when, under the leadership of Richard van der Riet Woolley, when it became a research hub for optical munitions and a factory for them. This also meant that, during the war, their staffing increased from 10 to 70 and many of the engineers employed were German-Jewish refugees who had being interned as 'enemy aliens'; among these was Kurt Gottlieb. Woolley had specifically sought out these men as he believed that they had 'more than double the number of experienced men in Australia for this particular class of work' and they were released under his supervision.

By the end of the war they designed and manufactured 43 different instruments including various forms of gun sights and artillery directors.

== National Time Service ==
First telescope used for National Time Service at Mount Stromlo Observatory, c. 1940s

In 1944, nearing the end of the war, Stromlo also became the home of the Australian National Time Service, also known as the Commonwealth Time Service, which was established there. As a part of this service they broadcast time signals by naval radio transmitters which were used to correct clocks, a frequency standard for determining exact locations and for navigation in the Southern Ocean. In 1971 the responsibility of the time service was transferred to the Australian Surveying and Land Information Group.

== Post war growth ==
Mount Stromlo Observatory staff, 1950

After the war, the observatory shifted direction again to stellar and galactic astronomy and was renamed The Commonwealth Observatory to reflect this. Wooley, still the director of the observatory, worked to gain support for a larger reflector, arguing that the southern hemisphere should attempt to compete with the effectiveness of American telescopes. Wooley would leave the role in 1955 to become Astronomer Royal in his home country the United Kingdom.

== Becoming part of the Australian National University ==
ANU was established in 1946 in nearby Canberra and joint staff appointments and graduate studies were almost immediately undertaken. A formal amalgamation took place in 1957, with the Mount Stromlo Observatory becoming part of the Department of Astronomy in the Research School of Physical Sciences at ANU. This would eventually lead to the formation of the Research School of Astronomy and Astrophysics in 1986.

== Fire ==
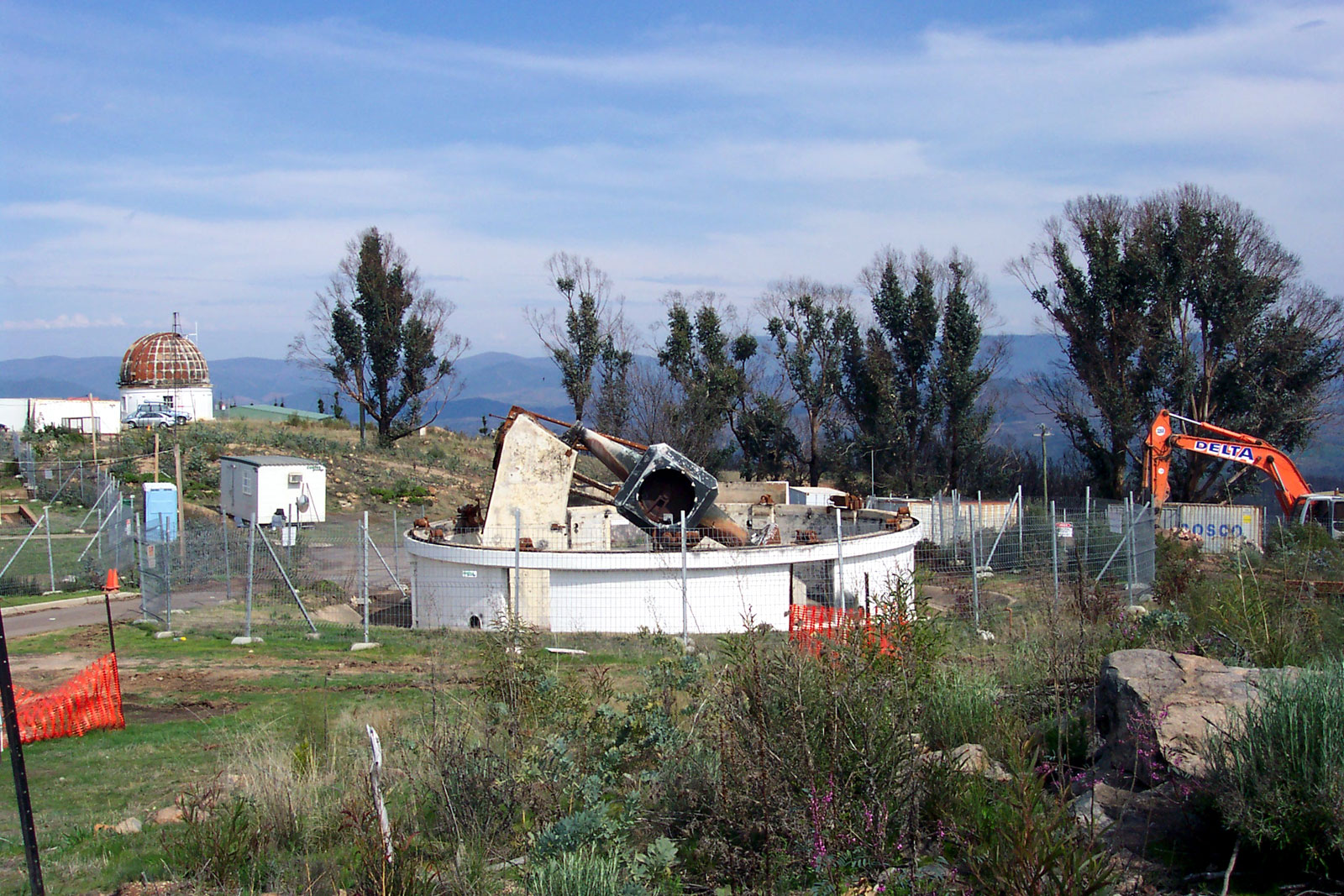
Remains of the dome of the 1.3 metres (50 in) Great Melbourne telescope

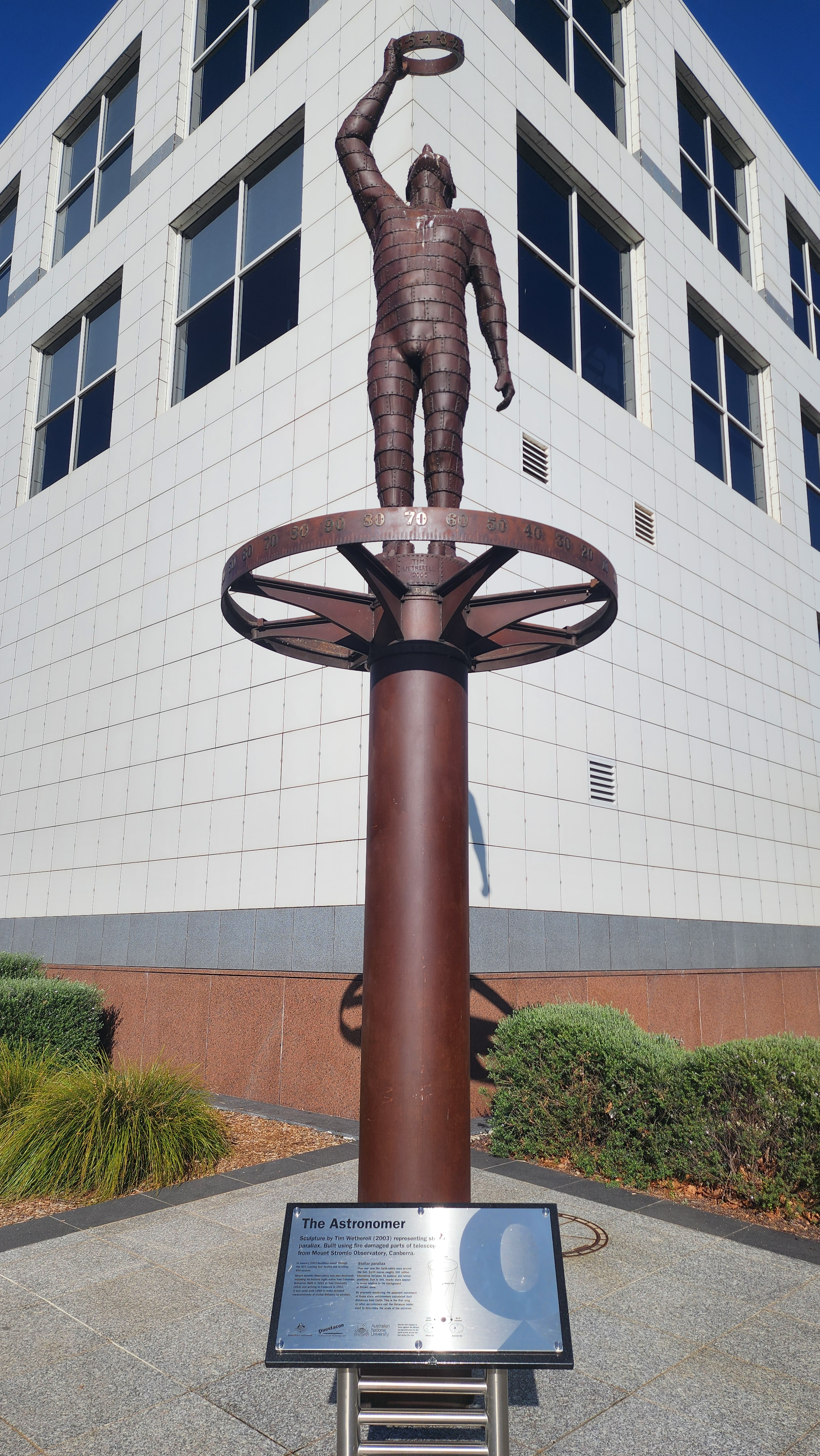
Statue of an astronomer and the concept of the cosmic distance ladder, created by scientist and artist Tim Wetherell, made from the azimuth ring and other parts of the Yale-Columbia Refractor (telescope) (c 1925) wrecked by the 2003 Canberra bushfires which burned out the Mount Stromlo Observatory; at Questacon, Canberra, Australian Capital Territory.

On 18 January 2003, the devastating Canberra firestorm hit Mount Stromlo (which was surrounded by a plantation pine forest), destroying five telescopes, workshops, seven homes, and the heritage-listed administration building. The only telescope to escape the fires was the 1886 15-centimetre Farnham telescope. Relics from the fire are preserved in the collection of the National Museum of Australia. They include a melted telescope mirror and a piece of melted optical glass (flint). The latter has pieces of charcoal and wire fused into it from the fierce heat of the fire.

Redevelopment is completed and the Observatory is now a major partner in the construction of the Giant Magellan Telescope. The current observatory director is Stuart Wyithe.

The director's residence, destroyed in the 2003 fire, was rebuilt and opened to the public as a memorial in 2015.

In 2023, the Quantum Optical Ground Station was launched. It allows for terabit-per-second communication using adaptive optics and lasers.

== Research ==
The MACHO project detected the first instance of the gravitational lensing of one star by another, known as gravitational microlensing, in 1993 (Alcock et al. 1993; Paczynski 1996). This discovery was made by repeated imaging of the Magellanic Clouds with the refurbished 50-inch Great Melbourne Telescope at Mount Stromlo, which was equipped with a mosaic of eight 2048 by 2048 pixel CCDs. The camera was constructed by the Centre for Particle Astrophysics in California (CFPA), and at the time was the largest digital camera ever built (Frame & Faulkner 2003). Observations began in July 1992 and the project concluded in December 1999. In total, the MACHO project made over 200 billion stellar measurements, with the data processed both at the observatory and at the Lawrence Livermore National Laboratory.

In 1994, ANU and Mount Stromlo astrophysicist Brian Schmidt co-founded the High-Z Supernova Search Team, which studied cosmic expansion using type Ia supernovae. In 1998, they discovered that cosmic expansion was accelerating, which implied the existence of dark energy. Schmidt shared the 2011 Nobel Prize in Physics with Saul Perlmutter and Adam Riess for this work.

ANU and Mount Stromlo astronomer Matthew Colless co-led the 2dF Galaxy Redshift Survey, the largest galaxy redshift survey of its time, conducted at the Anglo-Australian Observatory (AAO) with the 3.9m Anglo-Australian Telescope between 1997 and 11 April 2002. In total, the survey measured more than 245,000 galaxies, providing, along with the Sloan Digital Sky Survey, the definitive measurements of large scale structure in the low-redshift Universe.

== Advanced instrumentation ==
The instrumentation group at Mount Stromlo Observatory has built two instruments for the Gemini Telescope. This includes the near infrared integral field spectrometer, NIFS, deployed on Gemini-North, and the adaptive optics imager for Gemini-South, GSAOI. NIFS, when nearly completed, was destroyed in the bushfires of 18 January 2003, and rebuilt.

A new rapid survey telescope, SkyMapper, was completed in 2014. SkyMapper resides at the ANU's other observatory (Siding Spring) and can be operated remotely from Mount Stromlo.

Mount Stromlo hosts a DORIS (geodesy) earth station installed by France's CNES.

== Location ==
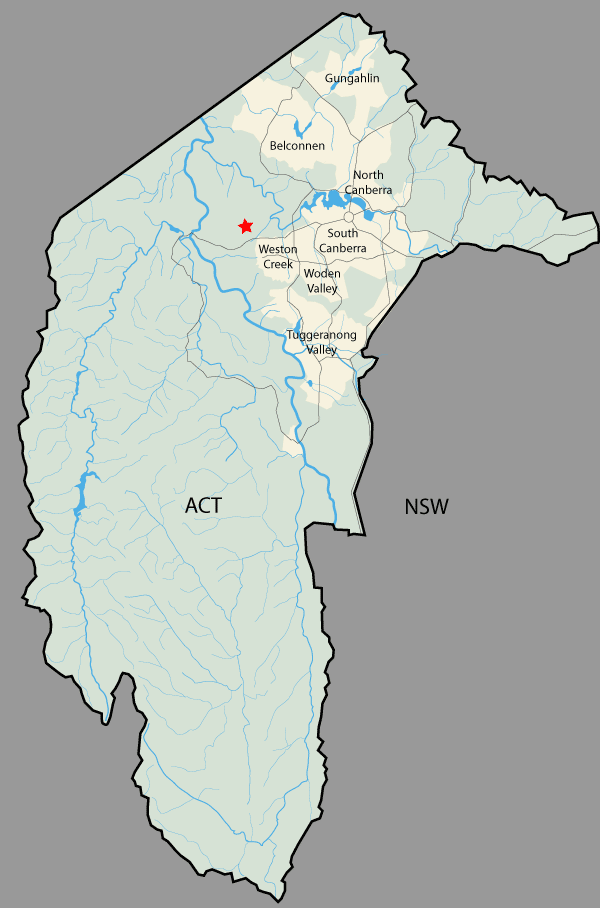
Mount Stromlo Locality Map

Mount Stromlo Observatory is located at an altitude of 770 metres above sea level on Mount Stromlo. Situated west of the centre of Canberra, near the district of Weston Creek. Canberra's main water supply treatment plant is located nearby.

== Engineering heritage award ==
The observatory received an Engineering Heritage International Marker from Engineers Australia as part of its Engineering Heritage Recognition Program.

== IEEE Special Citation ==
The observatory received an IEEE Special Citation from IEEE as part of its IEEE Milestone Program.

== Notable staff ==
Some notable former staff members of the observatory include:

- Clabon Allen
- Pietro Baracchi
- Bart Bok
- Priscilla Fairfield Bok
- Walter Geoffrey Duffield
- Kenneth Freeman
- Ben Gascoigne
- Kurt Gottlieb
- Arthur Robert Hogg
- Antoni Przybylski
- Brian Schmidt
- Richard van der Riet Woolley

== See also ==
- List of astronomical observatories
- Shrouds of the Night, 2007 by David Block and Ken Freeman

== Bibliography ==
- Alcock, C. et al. 1993, Nature, 365(6447), 621-623
- Paczynski, B. 1996, Annu. Rev. Astro. Astrophys., 34(1), 419-459
- Stromlo An Australian Observatory by Tom Frame and Don Faulkner, Allen and Unwin 1993, ISBN 1-86508-659-2
