= John O'Brien (Australian Army officer) =

Australian engineer and soldier

John William Alexander O'Brien
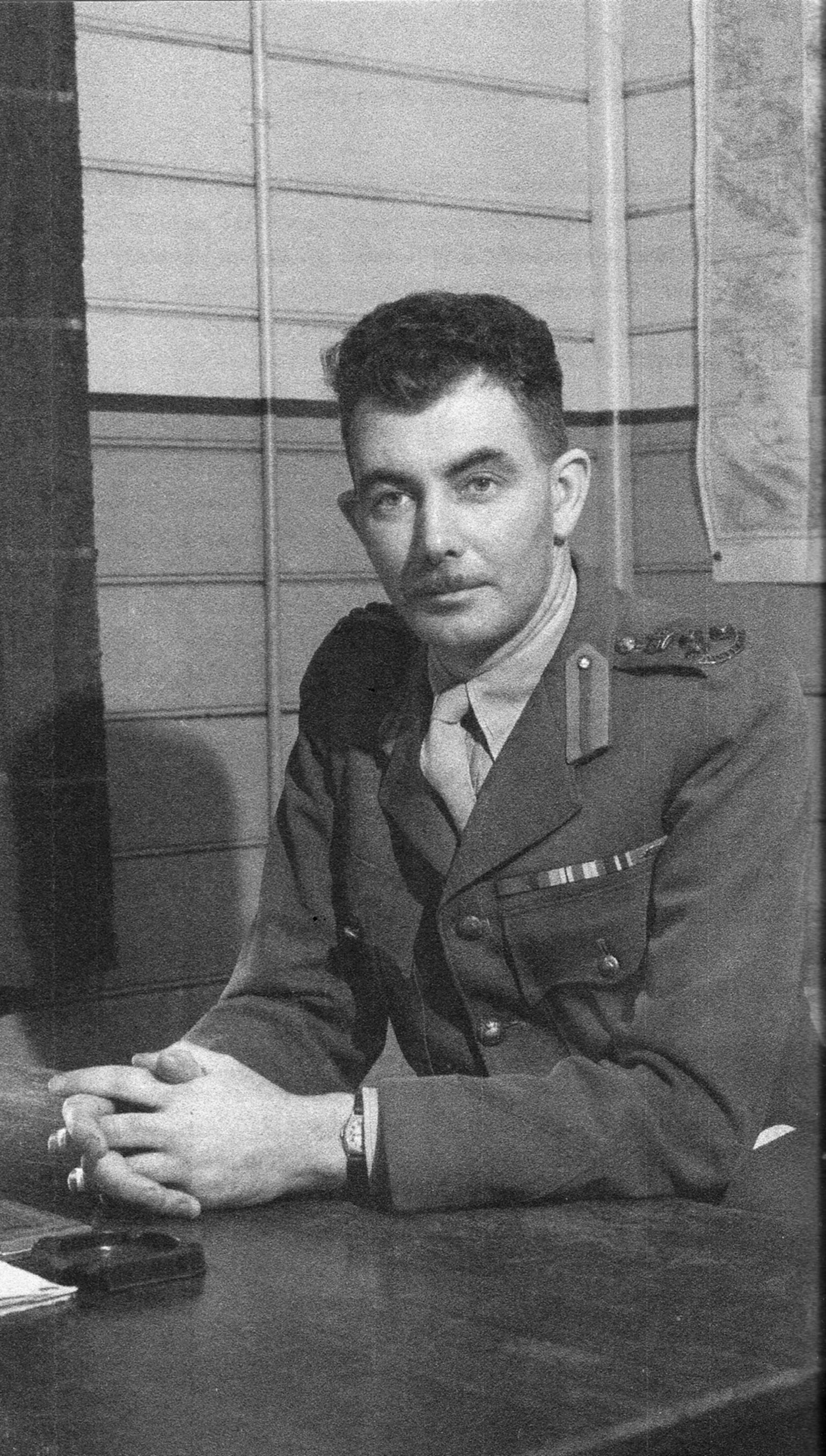
- Brigadier John William Alexander O'Brien at Victoria Barracks, Melbourne, in 1946
- Born: 13 June 1908; Collingwood, Victoria
- Died: 27 May 1980 (aged 71); Darlinghurst, New South Wales
- Burial place: South Head Cemetery, Bronte
- Military career
- Allegiance: Australia
- Branch: Australian Army
- Service years: 1928–1954
- Rank: Major General
- Service number: VX15127
- Commands: Royal Artillery, 3rd Division (1943); 2/5th Field Regiment (1941–42)
- Conflicts: Second World War; Syria–Lebanon Campaign; New Guinea Campaign; Occupation of Japan
- Awards: Distinguished Service Order; Mentioned in Despatches
- Other work: Mayor of Woollahra

Major General John William Alexander O'Brien, DSO (13 June 1908 – 27 May 1980) was a senior officer in the Australian Army during the Second World War. He was awarded the Distinguished Service Order for his service as commander of the 2/5th Field Regiment during the Syria–Lebanon Campaign. As Deputy Master General of the Ordnance he was involved in the development of the short 25-pounder and the Owen Gun. After the war he was the Australian supply and defence production representative in Washington, D.C., from 1951 to 1954, and the mayor of Woollahra from 1971 to 1972 and 1975 to 1976.

== Early life ==
John William Alexander O'Brien was born in Collingwood, Victoria, on 13 June 1908, the only child of Henry Charles O'Brien, a policeman, and his wife Jeanne Doris née Kerr. His father had served in the Boer War as a private in the 2nd Battalion, Australian Commonwealth Horse, and had served in the Militia. O'Brien was educated at Ivanhoe State School and St Patrick's College, East Melbourne. In 1925, he entered Working Men's College, where he studied civil engineering. That year he was a full-time student but the following year he secured a position as a draughtsman at Dorman Long & Company, an engineering firm, and became a part-time student. He graduated with his Diploma of Civil Engineering in 1928, and joined the Melbourne and Metropolitan Tramways Board.

Australia had compulsory military training at this time, and O'Brien served in the Australian Army Cadets at St Patricks' and then in the Militia. He joined the 2nd Survey Company of the Australian Garrison Artillery in 1927, and was promoted to lance sergeant in March 1927, and sergeant in March 1928. On 30 August 1928, he was commissioned as a lieutenant in the Australian Garrison Artillery. Conscription ended in 1929, but O'Brien remained with the now-volunteer Militia. In May 1930, O'Brien set out on a world tour to visit the battlefields of the American Civil War. A letter of introduction from Thomas Blamey, the Chief Commissioner of Victoria Police enabled him to obtain a work permit for the United States, and secure a position with the American Bridge Company in Gary, Indiana. He took a keen key interest in bridges, notably the Brooklyn Bridge, the George Washington Bridge and the Bayonne Bridge. He spent four days at the United States Army Field Artillery School at Fort Sill, Oklahoma, and toured the American Civil War battlefields in Virginia. In December 1930, O'Brien crossed the Atlantic to Britain, and then went to France to see the Australian battlefields there. He returned to England in January 1931, and served with the British Army's 1st Survey Company at Larkhill from 6 to 15 January 1835, before boarding the SS Barrabrook for the return trip to Australia.

O'Brien was promoted to captain in the Australian Garrison Artillery on 2 February 1932. He was posted to the 10th Field Artillery Brigade as its acting adjutant and temporary quartermaster on 15 November 1932, and transferred to the Australian Field Artillery on 6 December 1933. He became acting commander of the 24th Battery in June 1936. This appointment became substantive when he was promoted to major on 19 March 1937. He joined the United Stevedoring Company, a subsidiary of P&O, in 1932. He worked on a project to improve the unloading of coal, which had been accomplished by shovelling it into baskets and hoisting them down to the wharf. He replaced these with clamshell buckets, which hoisted the coal directly onto railway trucks. In 1938, he went into business with his former boss at United Stevedoring, Captain Jack Williams, founding a general engineering company called Fleet Forge Pty Ltd. A major contract was from the Royal Australian Navy to equip defensively equipped merchant ships. He married Gwen Victoria Goddard Britton, a saleswoman, on 31 March 1934 at St Columba's Church in Elwood, Victoria. He wore his Army uniform for the ceremony. They had a son, John, born in 1934, and a daughter, Jill, in 1939.

== Second World War ==
On 1 September 1939, O'Brien became a full-time soldier as Deputy Assistant Director of Artillery (DADA) at Army Headquarters in Melbourne. When the government announced in February 1940 that it was raising the 7th Division for overseas service, O'Brien decided to join the Second Australian Imperial Force (AIF). His application was supported by Brigadier Cyril Clowes and Lieutenant Colonels Edward Milford, Charles Lloyd, all of whom were regular officers, and all of whom were appointed to commands in the 7th Division. O'Brien became a major in the AIF on 1 May 1940, receiving the AIF service number VX15127. He became adjutant of the 2/7th Field Regiment, and supervised the training of its 13th and 14th Batteries. O'Brien had to shuttle between their camps at Woodside, South Australia and Northam, Western Australia. The two batteries did not come together for the first time until they sailed for the Middle East on the SS Stratheden in November 1940.

On 1 March 1941, O'Brien was given command of the 2/5th Field Regiment. Its commander, Lieutenant Colonel L. G. L. Ingate, had been invalided home, and the 7th Division was about to go into battle. The choice of replacements was limited to majors already in the Middle East, and the Commander Royal Artillery (CRA), 7th Division, Brigadier Frank Berryman, selected O'Brien. This made him the youngest regimental commander in the Army at the time. He was promoted to lieutenant colonel on 5 March. The 2/5th had trained with the old 18-pounders and 4.5-inch howitzers, and only received the new 25-pounders shortly before it moved to Mersa Matruh in April 1941.

The regiment participated in the Syria-Lebanon campaign in June 1941. The French counterattack at Merdjayoun caught the 2/5th Field Regiment with the 9th Battery at Jezzine and the 10th near Merdjayoun. O'Brien was with Berryman, conducting a reconnaissance of Beit ed-Dine, the 7th Division's next objective, when they received the news. They rushed back in the dark with the 9th Battery to plug the gap in the Allied position. O'Brien conducted a personal reconnaissance of the French position at Merdjayoun. He devised a fire support plan, and his guns supported the unsuccessful attack on the on 17 June, and 23 June attack that successfully recaptured the town. For his role in the Battle of Merdjayoun, O'Brien was mentioned in despatches, and awarded the Distinguished Service Order.

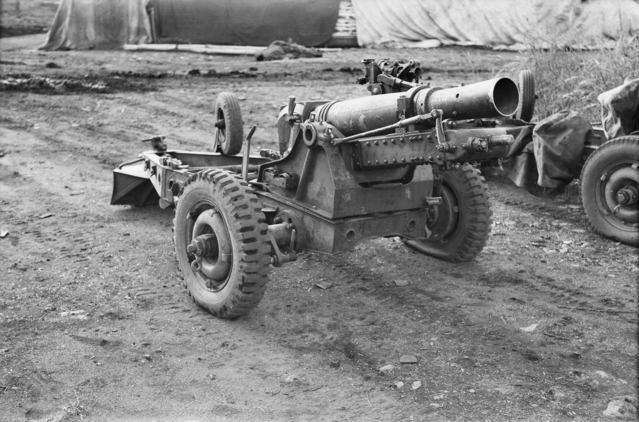
A short 25-pounder at Lae, New Guinea, in 1944. O'Brien initiated this project, and did the early design work on it.

On 11 February 1942, the 2/5th Field Regiment embarked for Australia on the SS Nieuw Amsterdam. It reached Adelaide on 23 March, and moved by rail to Tenterfield, New South Wales. O'Brien became CRA of the 3rd Division, with the rank of brigadier on 4 April. On 5 May he was appointed director of artillery at Allied Land Forces Headquarters (LHQ). He was once again the youngest officer in the Army of that rank when he was appointed. At this point Australian manufacturers, who had produced no artillery pieces in 1936, were produces most of the Army's artillery: the 3.7-inch and Bofors 40mm antiaircraft guns, the 25-pounder field gun, and the 6-pounder anti-tank gun; production of the 17-pounder was authorised on 28 August 1942.

O'Brien noted that the 25-pounder, while a superb weapon, was unsuitable for use in mountainous or jungle terrain due to the difficulty in transporting it. In September 1942, he recommended that it be redesigned to allow it to be broken down into components that could be dropped by parachute, and to reduce its weight by shortening the barrel and reducing the size of the tail, so that it could be towed by a jeep, which could be transported by air. O'Brien produced the early design diagrams himself. The project was taken up, and resulted in the short 25-pounder, of which some 213 were produced. It was first used in the landing at Nadzab in September 1943, when two short 25-pounders were dropped by parachute. While inferior to the standard design, it performed its specialised role well.

On 8 January 1943, O'Brien became the Deputy MGO in charge of the Equipment Division. As the tide of war turned in favour of the Allies, the government directed that production of munitions be reduced, allowing resources to be diverted to other uses, and avoiding the creation of stockpiles of unwanted items. O'Brien reviewed the ordnance program, and recommended that the production of three-quarters of the items he reviewed cease upon the expiration of the existing contracts, and scaled back the production of munitions to replacement rates. Two of the most controversial projects he inherited were the Owen Gun and the Sentinel tank. While he believed that the Owen Gun was a superior weapons based on its performance in trials, he deferred a decision until reports came in from the field. When these expressed a preference for the Owen Gun, he recommended its adoption. He reported his doubts about the Sentinel tank, leading to a June 1943 decision to cancel it.

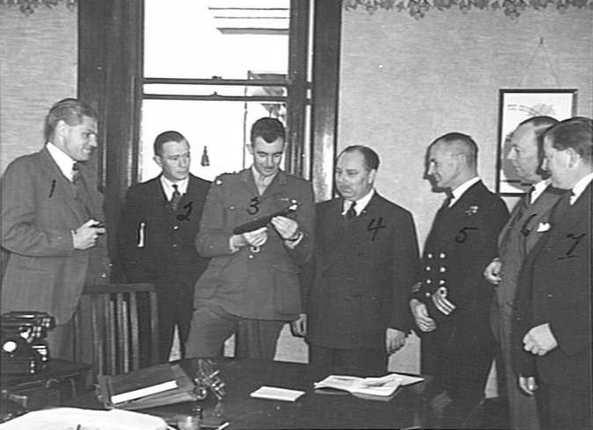
O'Brien (centre) at a meeting of the Executive Committee, Army Inventions Directorate in May 1945

To obtain a feel for the problems being encountered in the field, he made three trips to New Guinea, for 17 days in November 1942, 15 days in June 1943, and 16 days in February 1944. He contracted malaria during the first visit. O'Brien and the Engineer-in-Chief, Major General Clive Steele, left Melbourne on 5 August 1944 on a tour of ordnance plants in the United States, Canada and Britain. In London, O'Brien was invested with his membership of the Distinguished Service Order by George VI in a ceremony at Buckingham Palace. On the way back to Australia, he visited the war zones in Northern Italy and Burma.

In October 1945, following the surrender of Japan, O'Brien was appointed the head of the Australian Scientific Mission. As such, he worked closely with both the British Commonwealth Occupation Force and headed the Science and Technology Division of the Economic and Scientific Section at the headquarters of the Supreme Commander for the Allied Powers. As such, he travelled extensively around Japan. In October 1948, he was appointed the president of a military court convened to try Admiral Soemu Toyoda, the former commander of the Japanese Combined Fleet. After a lengthy trial that dragged on until 6 September 1949, the seven-member court acquitted Toyoda. Toyoda became the last top-level Japanese official to be tried for war crimes, and the only one to have all the charges against him dismissed.

== Later life ==
The post in Tokyo gradually became a sinecure, and O'Brien had time to produce a book, Guns and Gunners (1950), on the wartime deeds of the 2/5th Field Regiment. He was appointed Chief Military Observer for the United Nations in Korea, but before he could take up the post the Korean War broke out. His last Army assignment was as Australia's Senior Supply and Defence Production Representative in Washington, DC. He was transferred to the Reserve of Officers on 31 March 1951, and accorded the honorary rank of major general. As a brigadier in Tokyo, he had experienced problems because he had been senior to colonels, but junior to all generals, including brigadier generals. He ran into bureaucratic obstruction from the Department of Trade and Customs, the Department of External Affairs, and Joint Service Staff in Washington, where he was senior to the military attaché, Brigadier Lewis Dyke.

When the Washington posting came to an end in June 1954, O'Brien and his family took a tour of Europe before sailing from Southampton for Australia on the SS Orcades on 8 August. In April 1955 he became the director of engineering and sales with Howard Auto-Cultivators Pty Ltd, a Sydney firm that made rotary hoes. The company incorporated in October 1958, and the tool room was put up for sale. When no buyer was found, O'Brien bought it himself, setting up a new business, Contract Tooling Pty Ltd (CTPL), on 27 August 1959. He remained with CTPL until he decided to retire in 1972, and sold the company. He became involved in local politics. He was elected to the Woollahra Council on 9 December 1968, and served two terms as the mayor, from 1971 to 1972, and from 1975 to 1976. He died in Darlinghurst on 27 May 1980, and was buried in the South Head Cemetery in Bronte. A memorial service was held at St Mary Magdalene Church in Rose Bay.

== Bibliography ==
- O'Brien, John (1950). Guns and Gunners: The Story of the 2/5th Australian Field Regiment in World War II. Sydney: Angus and Robertson. OCLC 557458425.
