= UCL Observatory =

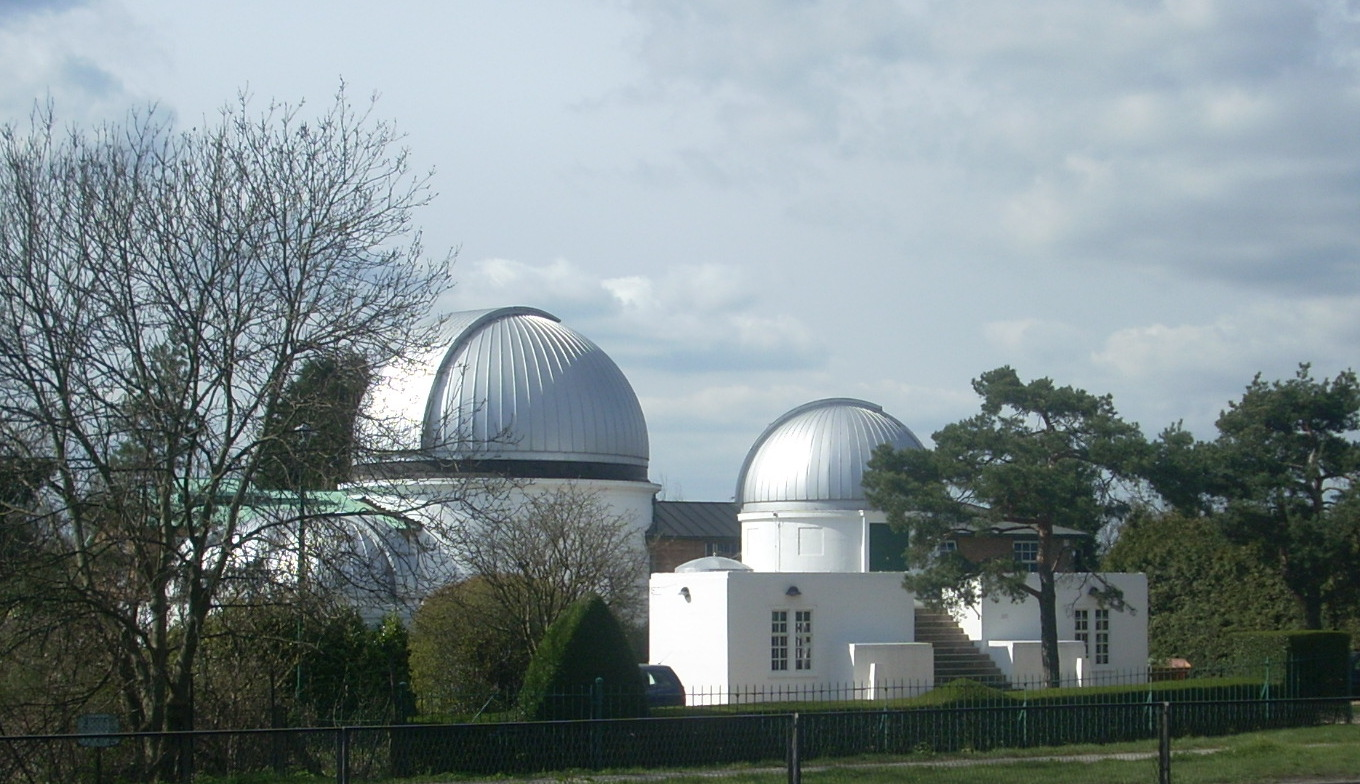
- The observatory in March 2009
- Alternative names: University of London Observatory
- Observatory code: 998
- Location: London Borough of Barnet, Greater London, London, England
- Coordinates: 51°36′48″N 0°14′31″W
- Website: www.ucl.ac.uk/ucl-observatory/
- Location of UCL Observatory
- Related media on Commons

UCL Observatory (called the University of London Observatory until 2015) at Mill Hill in London is an astronomical teaching observatory. It is part of the Department of Physics and Astronomy at University College London.

== History ==
The University of London Observatory was opened on 8 October 1929, by the Astronomer Royal Frank Watson Dyson. Its purpose was to house a 24-inch reflector built by Grubb of Dublin in 1881. That telescope was previously located at Dr W.E. Wilson's observatory at Daramona, County Westmeath, Ireland, and was donated to the University of London after Wilson's death.

An 8-inch refractor was installed in 1931 following its donation to the University by H.R. Fry of Barnet the previous year, and was named after him. In 1932, the University received a 6-inch refractor telescope from the estate of Mr. John Joynson of Liverpool. This was initially housed at the UCL main building in Bloomsbury, central London, but was later relocated to the Observatory. In July 1938, the Observatory was further expanded to accommodate the 24-inch/18-inch twin refractor that had been removed from the Radcliffe Observatory at Oxford in 1934.

Management of the observatory was transferred to UCL (then a member college of the University of London) in 1951. Over the next ten years the observatory was expanded with additional library, lecture, and laboratory space. In 1965, the observatory purchased a nearby house at 33-35 Daws Lane to serve as an annexe hosting additional office and laboratory space, including a lunar research group led by Gilbert Fielder. In 1972 UCL merged its astronomy and physics departments and began gradually moving research staff from the observatory to the main Bloomsbury campus and the Mullard Space Science Laboratory. Once all planetary science research staff had been relocated, the observatory annexe was sold in 1999.

The Wilson telescope was retired in 1974 and sold to Merseyside Museums; it is now on display in the World Museum, Liverpool. Its replacement at ULO was a 24-inch Ritchey-Chrétien Cassegrain reflector, installed in 1975 and named after C.W. Allen, a former director of the observatory. In 1981, the Joynson telescope, which had been installed under the floor of the Radcliffe's dome, was refurbished. From 1982 to 1997, the 8-inch Fry telescope was decommissioned for extensive refurbishment, being reinstalled in a new building that later housed new Celestron 14-inch telescopes acquired in 2006 (East dome) and 2009 (West dome). During the Fry's refurbishment, the 6-inch Joynson telescope was installed on its berth. The Joynson telescope is now no longer available for use.

In the late 20th and early 21st centuries UCL gradually separated from the University of London; in 2005 UCL was given its own degree-granting powers (previously UCL students had received their degrees from the University of London). As part of this separation process, the observatory was renamed UCL Observatory (UCLO) in October 2015. In January 2013, the Observatory was affiliated with the Worshipful Company of Clockmakers. On 21 January 2014 supernova SN2014J was discovered at the observatory by staff member Steve Fossey, during a teaching session with four undergraduate students.

== Current status ==
In addition to the Fry and Radcliffe telescopes, two Celestron 14-inch Schmidt-Cassegrain telescopes are housed in permanent domes, and there are several smaller free-standing telescopes. In June 2019, the Allen telescope was replaced by the Perren, an 80-cm altazimuth-mounted Cassegrain instrument built by ASTELCO.

The observatory's primary purpose is to provide UCL undergraduates with training in practical astrophysical techniques and data-handling. There is also a research programme, involving students in observing transits of extrasolar planets.

== Gallery ==
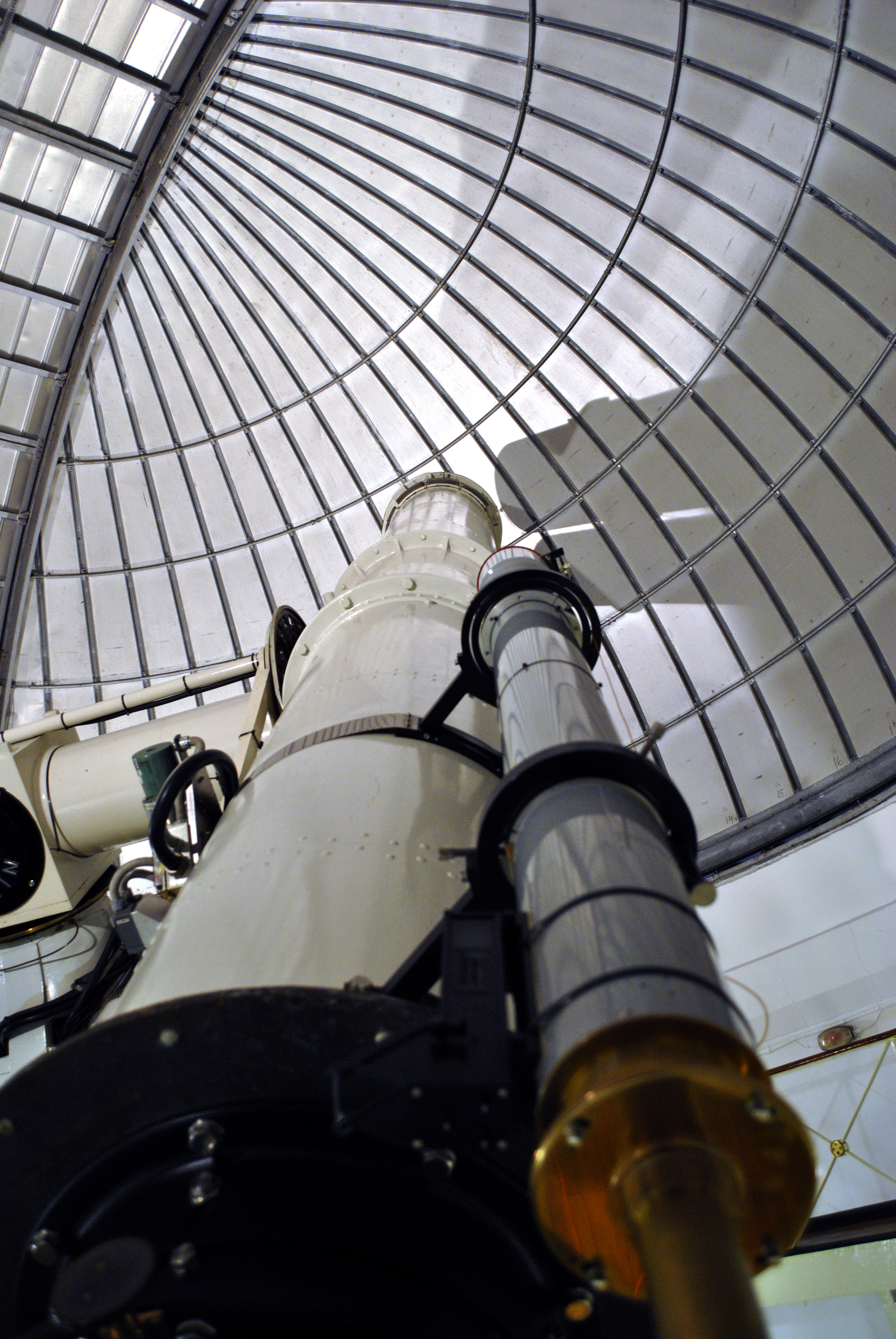
The Radcliffe twin refractor telescope

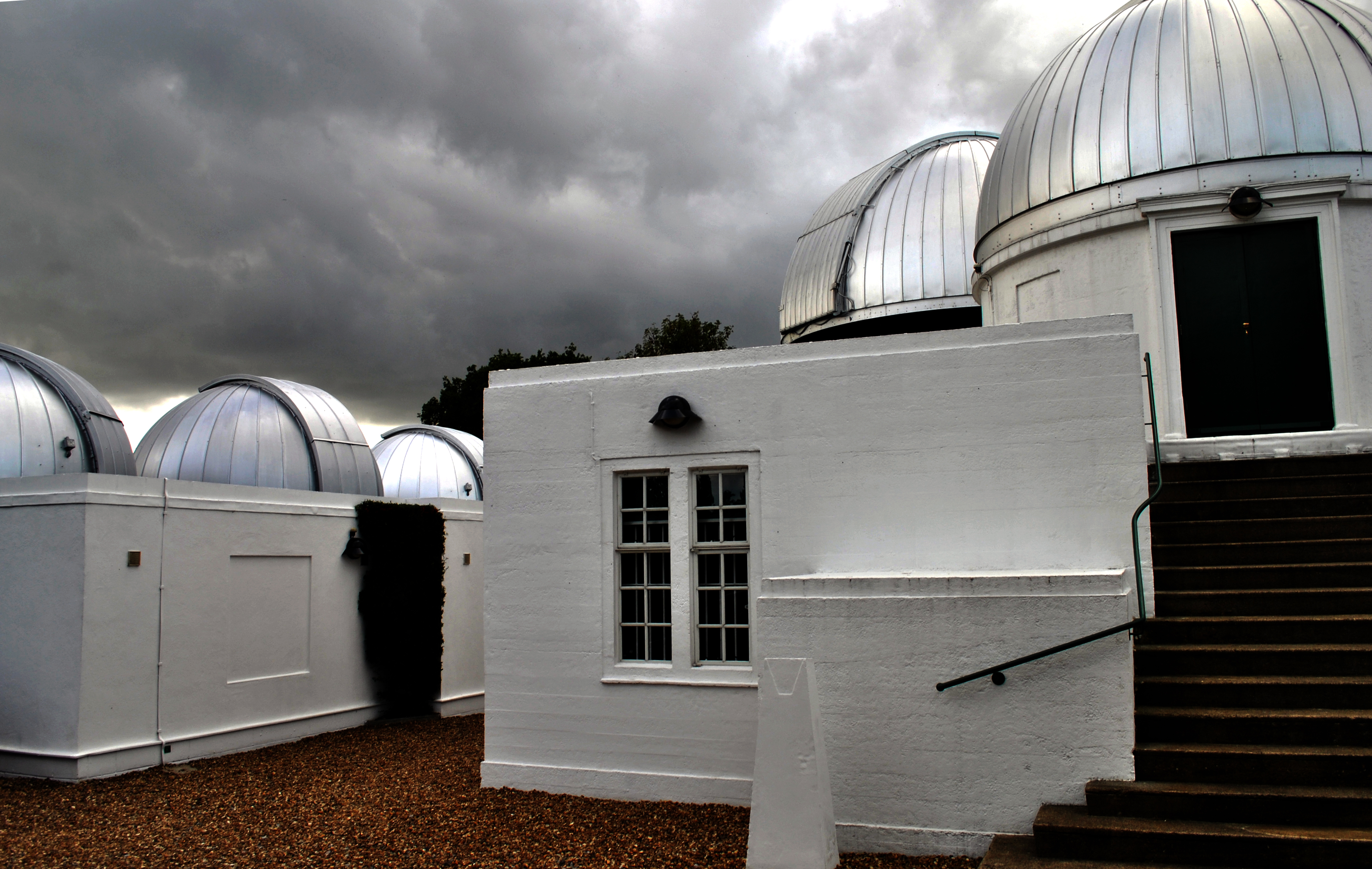
Telescope enclosures at the observatory

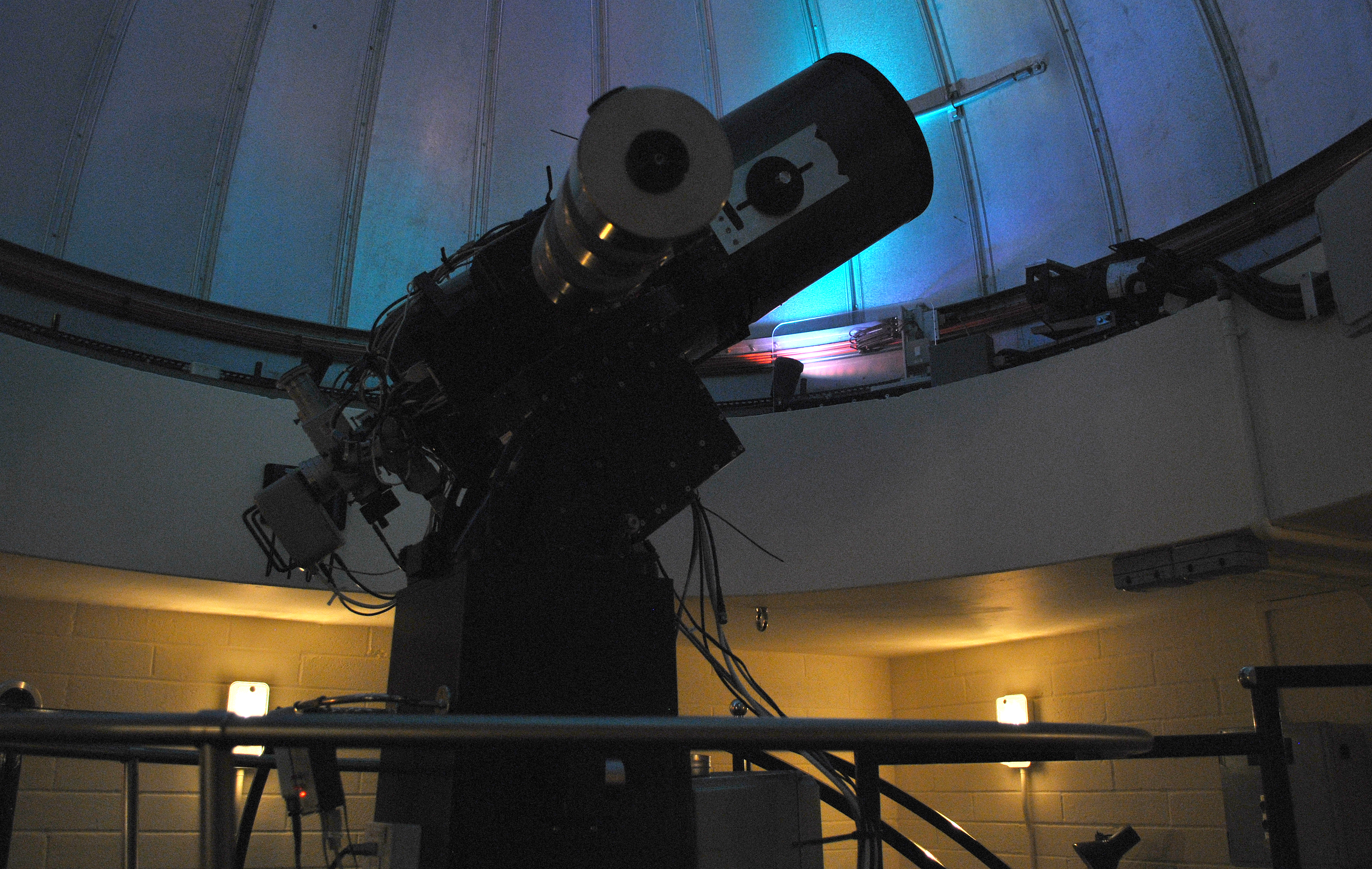
One of two Celestron C14 reflector telescopes at ULO

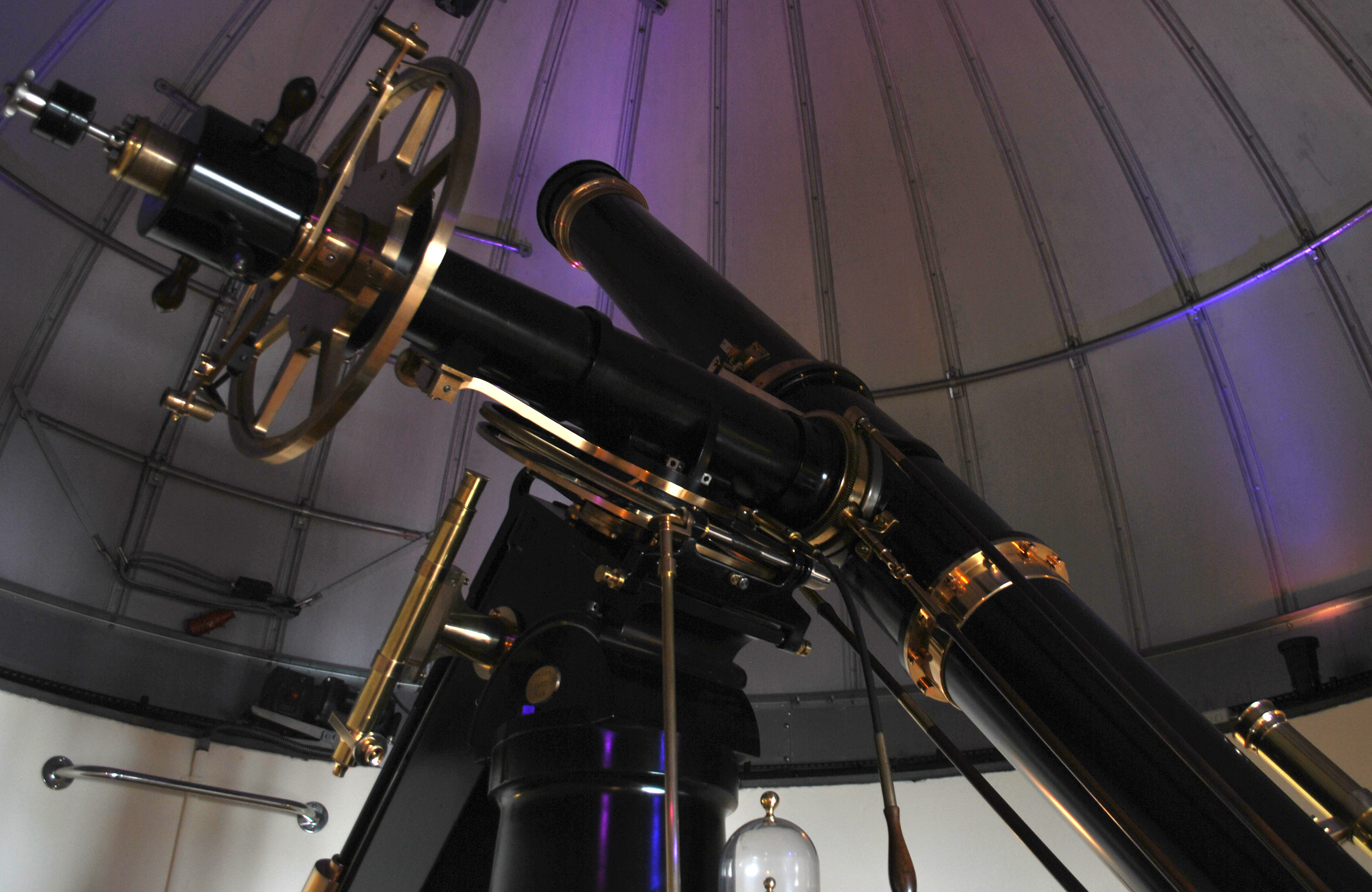
Fry refractor telescope, the observatory's oldest telescope

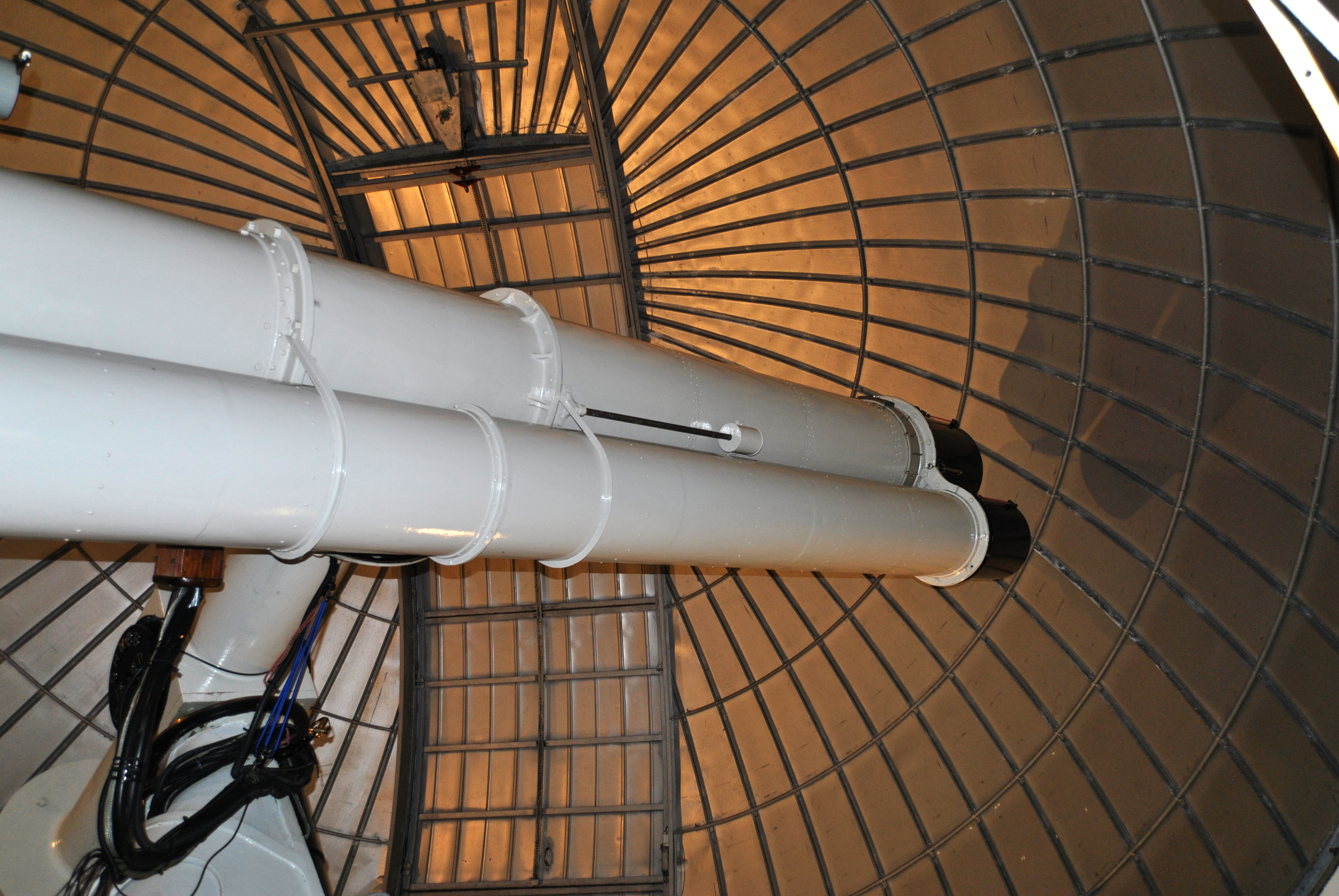
Despite its modest diameter, the Radcliffe telescope is very long because it has a long focal length
