= Steve Fossey =

British astronomer

- Education: University College London
- Known for: SN 2014J, HD 80606b
- Scientific career
- Fields: Astronomy
- Workplaces: UCL Observatory
- Thesis: The diffuse interstellar features and interstellar relationships (1990)
- Website: www.ucl.ac.uk/astrophysics/dr-steve-fossey-director-uclo

Stephen John Fossey is a British astronomer who is the director of UCL Observatory, part of University College London (UCL). He discovered the nearby supernova SN 2014J and is one of the three editors of The Observatory magazine.

== Education ==
Fossey studied at University College London (UCL), receiving his Bachelor of Science degree in 1983. He then completed a PhD in astronomy in 1990, also at UCL. Fossey then became a member of staff at University of London Observatory (ULO), which was renamed UCL Observatory in 2015.

== Research and publications ==
Fossey's research interests are in the interstellar medium, exoplanets and time-domain astronomy. He has authored two dozen refereed scientific papers on these topics. His first scientific publication was a single-author letter in Nature.

Along with Ingo Waldmann and David Kipping, Fossey discovered in 2009 that the exoplanet HD 80606b (previously known from radial velocity) transits its host star. In January 2014, Fossey discovered supernova SN 2014J, the closest supernova for several decades.

Fossey is an editor of The Observatory magazine.
