= 2/5th Field Regiment =

Australian Army artillery regiment

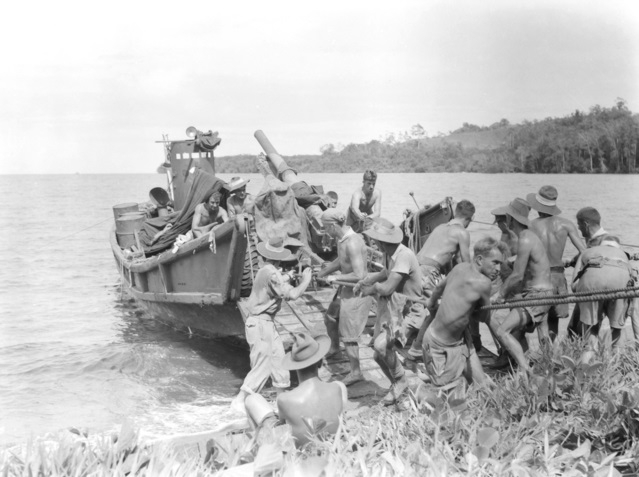
- Members of the 2/5th Field Regiment unloading a 25 Pounder at Buna
- Active: 1940–1946
- Country: Australia
- Branch: Australian Military Forces
- Type: Regiment
- Role: Artillery
- Part of: 7th Division
- Engagements: World War II: North African campaign; Syria–Lebanon campaign; Battle of Milne Bay; Battle of Buna–Gona; Borneo campaign

Insignia
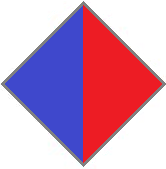
- Unit colour patch

The 2/5th Field Regiment was an Australian Army artillery regiment formed in May 1940 as part of the Second Australian Imperial Force for service during World War II. Assigned to the 7th Division, the regiment undertook defensive duties in Egypt during the North African campaign in early 1941, before taking part in the Syria–Lebanon campaign. Occupation duties followed before the regiment was brought back to Australia in early 1942, in response to Japan's entry into the war. The regiment subsequently fought two significant battles in New Guinea in 1942–1943 at Milne Bay and Buna before undertaking garrison duties around Port Moresby until early 1944. Withdrawn to Australia, the regiment's final campaign came late in the war when it was committed to the Borneo campaign, taking part landing at Balikpapan. The regiment was disbanded in early 1946.

== History ==
The 2/5th Field Regiment was formed in May 1940, as part of the all volunteer Second Australian Imperial Force. The regiment's numerical designation had previously been used to form the "2/5th Army Field Regiment" in November 1939, but this unit had subsequently been redesignated as the "2/5th Anti-Tank Regiment", and then the "2/1st Anti-Tank Regiment" in January and February 1940. The newly raised regiment came into being at Ingleburn, New South Wales, and at the outset consisted of two batteries: the 9th and 10th. Most of the regiment's personnel came from Queensland, although one battery was recruited from Tasmania. The regiment's first commanding officer was Lieutenant Colonel Horace Strutt. Assigned to the 7th Division, the regiment's personnel completed training at Bathurst, New South Wales, before departing for the Middle East in October 1940. Concentrating in Palestine, the regiment was only partially equipped. It continued its training throughout early 1941 while it waited for the remainder of its equipment and in early 1941 received orders to deploy to Greece; however, they were diverted to Ikingi Maryut, in Egypt, before moving into defensive positions around Mersa Matruh.

In June 1941, the regiment was committed to the Syria–Lebanon campaign, fighting against Vichy French forces. Equipped with sixteen 25-pounder field guns, the regiment was commanded by Lieutenant Colonel John O'Brien, who was one of the youngest commanders in the 2nd AIF at the time. Initially, the regiment was placed into reserve, located around Er Rama, although the 9th Battery was detached to support the 5th Indian Brigade, seeing action around El Kuneitra. Following this, the regiment supported the capture of Merdjayoun, along with the 2/6th Field Regiment. After this, the 10th Battery remained around Merdjayoun, while the rest of the regiment was assigned to support the 25th Brigade as it attacked Jezzine. After a French counter-attack recaptured Merdjayoun, the 2/5th supported Berryforce, the ad hoc force established to retake it. Later, they supported the British 23rd Infantry Brigade, until July when the regiment moved to the coastal sector and supported the advance on Damour and Beirut, assigned to the 17th Brigade, which had been detached from the 6th Division. For his actions during the fighting around Merdjayoun and Damour, one member of the regiment, Lieutenant Roden Cutler, received the Victoria Cross.

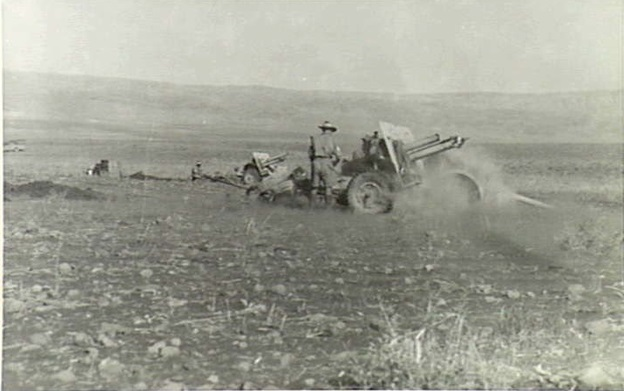
25-pounder field guns from the 2/5th firing a practise shoot at Baalbek, Syria, September 1941

The campaign concluded in mid-July with an armistice, after which the regiment undertook occupation duties for the remainder of 1941. During this time, the 2/5th detached one battery to Latakia, to provide support to forces guarding the Turkish border, while the remainder of the regiment occupied the Tripoli fortress. A third battery was raised within the regiment during this time, designated as the 55th Battery. With Japan's entry into the war in late 1941, the Australian government sought to bring troops from the 6th and 7th Divisions back to Australia to meet the threat in early 1942. Consequently, the 2/5th Field Regiment moved to Palestine in January prior to embarking the following month. Landing in Adelaide in March, the regiment moved overland to Queensland, reaching Kilcoy in May. There, the regiment concentrated with the 18th Brigade, which was tasked with defensive duties in the event of a Japanese invasion north of Brisbane.

In August 1942, the regiment's first battery, the 9th, deployed to Milne Bay in support of the 18th Brigade, as Japanese forces advanced along the Kokoda Track towards Port Moresby. They subsequently took part in the Battle of Milne Bay, while the rest of the regiment was preparing for deployment around Woodford, arriving in October. The 55th Battery subsequently took part in the capture of Buna, being moved by sea from Oro Bay aboard several luggers. During the move, the vessels were attacked and two guns were lost, as well as several personnel killed. They subsequently supported the 18th Brigade and US 32nd Infantry Division. Meanwhile, the 10th Battery undertook defensive duties around Porlock Harbour and on Goodenough Island. The regiment's batteries were progressively relieved between February and April 1943, after which it concentrated around Port Moresby, remaining there until January 1944, when they returned to Brisbane having spent the remainder of its time in New Guinea carrying out garrison duties.

A period of leave followed for the regiment's personnel, after which they rejoined the unit at Warwick, Queensland, before moving to Strathpine, where they joined the rest of the 7th Division's artillery. By this stage in the war there were limited combat opportunities for Australian forces around this time, as US forces had taken over as the main combat force in the Pacific. As a result, a long period of training followed, while Australian troops waited for a new operation. In August, the regiment moved to the Atherton Tablelands, where further training was carried out. Finally, late in the war, the 7th Division was assigned a role in the recapture of Borneo, specifically the landing at Balikpapan. Within this effort, the 2/5th was allocated to support the 21st Brigade. Arriving at Morotai Island in June 1945, the 9th Battery led the regiment ashore in the first wave on 1 July, along with regimental headquarters, which temporarily commanded the divisional fire support assets until the divisional headquarters could land. After the remainder of the regiment arrived, they provided support to the 21st Brigade as advanced to capture the Manggar airstrip. Major combat operations were concluded by 22 July. After this, the regiment sent out patrols, assisting the infantry with local security operations.

Following the war, the regiment's personnel were demobilised and returned to Australia in drafts based on priority. Most of these personnel arrived in Australia before Christmas 1945; while they waited they were kept occupied with vocational education and training, as well as sport and recreational activities. In January 1946, the regiment's remaining cadre, amounting to 48 men, embarked from Balikpapan after transferring their guns to Dutch East Indies forces, and returned to Australia for disbandment. These personnel reached Brisbane in early February when the regiment ceased to exist. Casualties amongst the regiment's personnel totalled 21 dead from all causes: 15 killed in action, five died of wounds, and one accidentally killed. In addition, 23 members were wounded in action. Members of the regiment received the following awards: one Victoria Cross, four Distinguished Service Orders, one Military Cross, seven Military Medals, one British Empire Medal and 25 Mentions in Despatches.

== Commanders ==
The following officers commanded the 2/5th Field Regiment during the war:

- Lieutenant Colonel Lloyd Ingate (1940–1941)
- Lieutenant Colonel John William Alexander O'Brien (1941–1942)
- Lieutenant Colonel William Courtney (1942–1944)
- Lieutenant Colonel Frank Richardson (1944–1945)
