= Shrouds of the Night =

Book by Ken Freeman

- Author: David Block, Ken Freeman
- Genre: Astronomy
- Publication date: 2007

Shrouds of the Night is a book from the astronomy genre.

The book was written at the Mount Stromlo Observatory in 2007 by David Block and Ken Freeman. It is a timetable of astronomical photography from 1826 to the present day.

Much of the content of this book is published here for the first time. Two examples of this are: one from Arizona's Lowell Observatory and another from the Royal Astronomical Society of London.
