= Clabon Allen =

Australian astronomer

Clabon Allen, c. 1940s

Clabon Walter (Cla) Allen FRAS, (28 December 1904 – 11 December 1987) was an Australian astronomer, director of the University of London Observatory and author of Astrophysical Quantities.

== Biography ==
Allen was born at Subiaco, Perth the third child of James Bernard Allen (died 1912), a South Australian-born lecturer in physics at Perth Technical School, and his wife Alice Hooper, née Aitken, a New Zealand-born trained nurse. Cla (as he was known) was educated at the High School, Perth, Western Australia and the University of Western Australia (B.Sc., 1926; M.Sc., 1929; D.Sc., 1936). Allen was appointed to a research fellowship at the newly established Commonwealth Solar Observatory in 1926 at Mount Stromlo, Australian Capital Territory, becoming an assistant there in 1928. It was there, in 1936, that he was awarded a fellowship of the Royal Astronomical Society.

Allen observed the 1 October 1940 solar eclipse in South Africa and obtained important results on the solar corona, including measurements of its electron density which were to prove invaluable to radio astronomers. Also in the 1940s Allen was celebrated for his photometric study of the Sun, following which he was recognised as an international authority on the sun and its disturbances. This work became essential in overcoming a variety of radio communications issues during World War II.

Allen accepted an invitation by Sir Harrie Massey in 1951 to become Perren professor of astronomy at University College, London, and director of the University of London Observatory, Mill Hill. Within a few years Allen had built up his observatory into one of the best astronomical departments in England. He published the first edition of Astrophysical Quantities in 1955, a compilation of numerical data of astrophysical interest. Universally known as "AQ", it is the most quoted book on the subject.

Allen retired in 1972 and returned to Canberra where he died on 11 December 1987.

== Collections ==
Allen's papers, including his diaries, are held at the National Library of Australia.
