= Richard van der Riet Woolley =

English astronomer (1906–1986)

Sir Richard van der Riet Woolley OBE FRS
- Richard van der Riet Woolley at the Commonwealth Solar Observatory, Canberra, 1940s
- Born: 24 April 1906; Weymouth, Dorset, England
- Died: 24 December 1986 (aged 80); Somerset West, Cape Province, South Africa
- Education: University of Cape Town (BSc, MSc); Gonville and Caius College, Cambridge (MA (Cantab), PhD)
- Known for: Astronomer Royal
- Awards: Fellow of the Royal Society
- Scientific career
- Fields: Astronomy

11th Astronomer Royal
- In office 1956–1971
- Preceded by: Harold Spencer Jones
- Succeeded by: Martin Ryle

Sir Richard van der Riet Woolley OBE FRS (24 April 1906 – 24 December 1986) was an English astronomer who became the eleventh Astronomer Royal. His mother's maiden name was Van der Riet.

== Biography ==
Woolley was born in Weymouth, Dorset and attended Allhallows College, then in Honiton, for about 18 months, but then moved with his parents to the Union of South Africa upon their retirement. There he attended and received his degree in Mathematics and Physics from the University of Cape Town. Woolley returned to the United Kingdom and studied for a further MA degree in Mathematics and, later, a PhD at Gonville and Caius College, Cambridge. After two years at Mount Wilson Observatory he again returned to the United Kingdom in 1931.

From 1937 to 1939, he was Senior Assistant Observer and John Couch Adams Astronomer at the Cambridge Observatory.

Woolley specialized in solar astronomy and in 1939 he was appointed director of the Commonwealth Solar Observatory in Canberra, Australia. In this role he was instrumental in its World War II role as a optical munitions research hub and factory; during this time he is also recruited a number of Jewish scientists and engineers, many of whom were refugees to Australia, to work there recognising the need for their skills and took personal responsibility for. Later in the war he was additionally put in charge of the Army Inventions Directorate which also employed Kurt Gottlieb one of the refugees he had brought to the observatory.

Woolley had intended to retire in the 1950s, however, he later returned to the United Kingdom to take up his appointment as Astronomer Royal from 1956 to 1971. It has been described as an uncharacteristic decision and that he had asked for his name to be withdrawn from consideration but it had already been given to Queen Elizabeth II.

Woolley was elected a Fellow of the Royal Society in 1953 and won the Gold Medal of the Royal Astronomical Society in 1971. From 1972 to 1976 he was director of the new South African Astronomical Observatory. He retired in the late 1970s and spent most of his retirement in South Africa.

Woolley was appointed an OBE in 1953 and knighted in 1963.

== Views on the practicality of space flight ==
Woolley is known for his initial disbelief in the practicalities of space flight, a notion he shared with Sir Harold Spencer Jones, his predecessor as Astronomer Royal. In a 1936 book review of P.E. Cleator's Rockets Through Space, Woolley wrote:

"The whole procedure [of shooting rockets into space]...presents difficulties of so fundamental a nature, that we are forced to dismiss the notion as essentially impracticable, in spite of the author's insistent appeal to put aside prejudice and to recollect the supposed impossibility of heavier-than-air flight before it was actually accomplished"

On appointment as Astronomer Royal, he reiterated his long-held view that "space travel is utter bilge". Speaking to Time in 1956, Woolley noted

"It's utter bilge. I don't think anybody will ever put up enough money to do such a thing . . . What good would it do us? If we spent the same amount of money on preparing first-class astronomical equipment we would learn much more about the universe . . . It is all rather rot"

Woolley's protestations came just one year prior to the launch of Sputnik 1, five years before the start of the Apollo Program, and thirteen years before the first human landing on the Moon.

In a 1995 letter to New Scientist, J.A. Terry and John Rudge pointed out that the quotation ascribed to Woolley is actually a misquotation of what he actually said (as they had heard themselves on Radio Newsreel). Terry and Rudge report that Woolley's statement was: "All this talk about space travel is utter bilge, really." Woolley went on to say: "It would cost as much as a major war just to put a man on the moon." Terry and Rudge assert that Woolley's latter prediction turned out to be quite accurate, and state that the deletion of the first four words of the quotation by newspaper editors was in reaction to the fact that it was those self-same newspaper's hyperbolic articles, talking about space travel, that Woolley was criticising. "Anyone", said Terry and Rudge, "who had seen the flamboyant articles about space travel and the imminent colonisation of the moon and planets that were splashed all over the newspapers in 1956, with science fiction-style illustrations, must have been immediately aware of what the new Astronomer Royal was riled about."

== Publications ==
- The Outer Layers of a Star (1953) co-written with Prof Walter Stibbs.
