= Army Inventions Board =

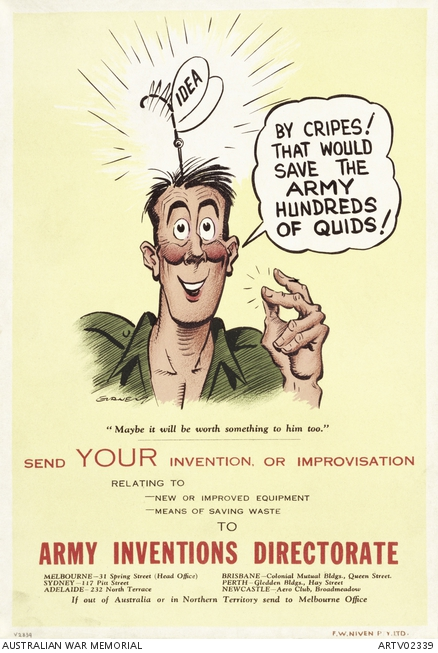
The top half of the poster features a cartoon by Alex Gurney of an Australian soldier having a bright idea.

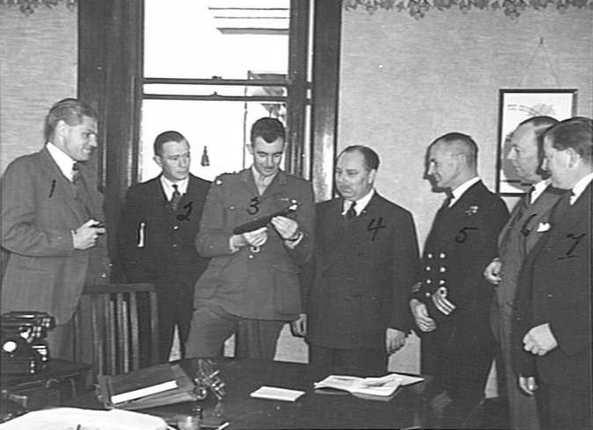
O'Brien (centre) at a meeting of the executive committee, Army Inventions Directorate in May 1945

The Australian Army Inventions Board was established in 1900, and played a significant role in Allied Research and Development during World War I. However, by the late 1930s it had been allowed to become mostly inactive. It was revived in early 1940 under the name 'Army Central Inventions Board', though it was still generally known by its older name. In 1942 the board was reorganized into the Army Inventions Directorate (circa 1942–1946). It was a government body of the Commonwealth of Australia, set up in 1942 to handle the thousands of inventions submitted by the public. These inventions numbered some 27,000; a mere 127 of which were eventually accepted by the Army as being of notable value or suitable for military purposes. The best known invention accepted by the Army Inventions Board was the Australian-designed Owen Gun, a machine carbine which took a few years to get off the ground.

The Army Inventions Directorate was located at Victoria Barracks in Melbourne.

== See also ==
- History of Australia since 1901
