= Mount Stromlo =

Mountain in the Australian Capital Territory

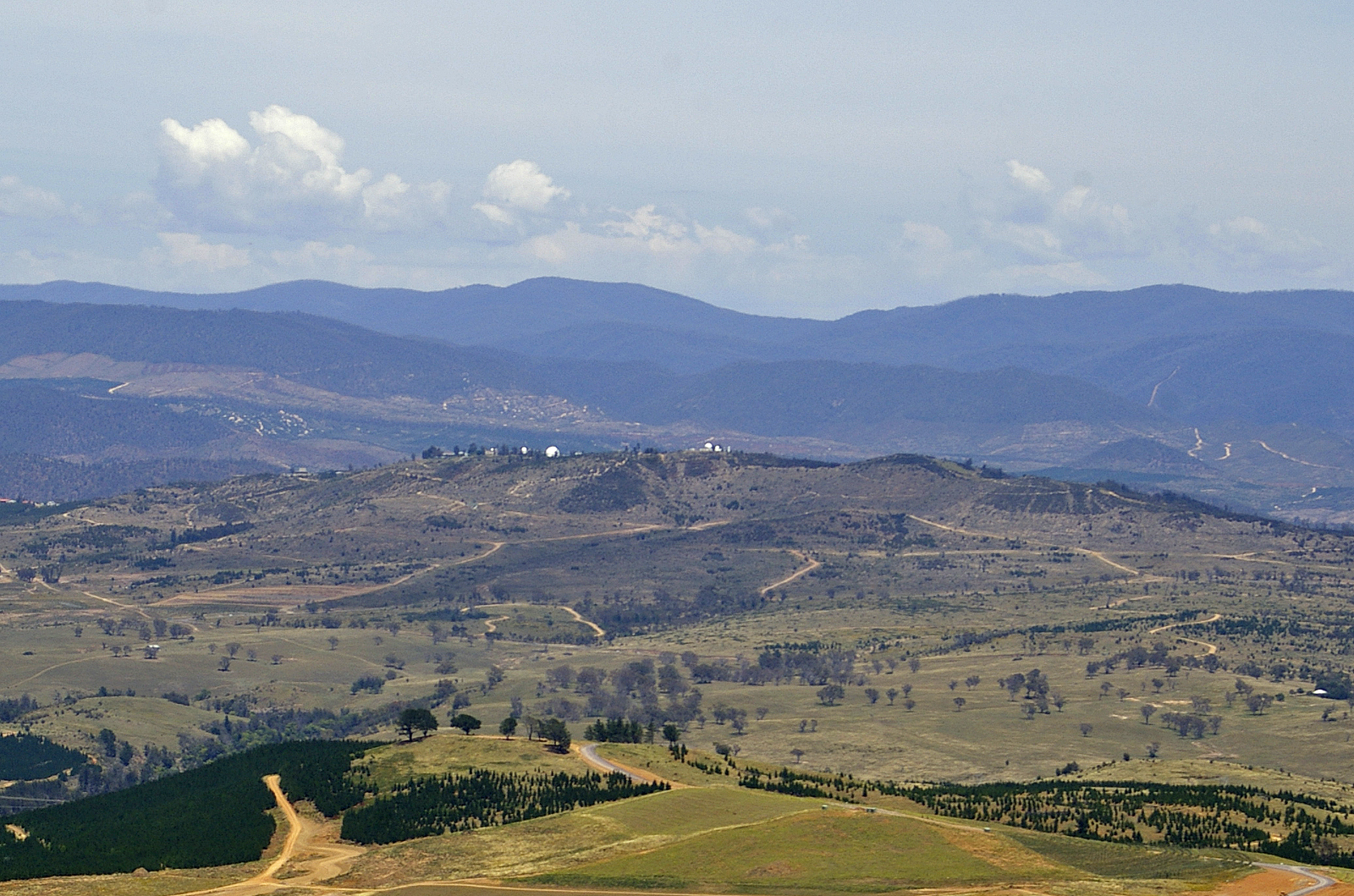
- Mount Stromlo, as viewed from the Telstra Tower.

Highest point
- Elevation: 770 m (2,530 ft)
- Prominence: 154 m (505 ft)
- Coordinates: 35°19′S 149°01′E

Geography
- Location within Australian Capital Territory
- Location: Australian Capital Territory, Australia

Geology
- Rock age: Silurian

Mount Stromlo is a mountain with an elevation of 770 metres (2,530 ft) AHD that is situated in the Australian Capital Territory (ACT), Australia. The mountain is notable as the location of the Mount Stromlo Observatory and Stromlo Forest Park. The mountain forms part of the catchment area of the Cotter River which is the primary water supply for part of the ACT. The origins of the name Mount Stromlo are unclear.)

== Geology ==
The rock on Mount Stromlo consists of ignimbrite from the Laidlaw Volcanics. This erupted in the middle to late Silurian period over the Deakin Volcanics rhyodacite which is visible on the surface on the lower slopes in the east and southeast sides. The northern lower slopes are covered with calcareous shale; its classification as part of the Laidlaw Volcanics requires verification against a geological map. This is cut off on the northwest side by the Winslade Fault, which heads north east to Cook and Kaleen. A spur fault heads off east from the Winslade Fault to under the Scrivener Dam. The Walker Volcanics are of Middle Silurian age, whereas the Laidlaw Volcanics are Late Silurian. The northern side was uplifted relative to the southern side along the fault system.

The name Stromlo is taken from the poems of Ossian.

=== Landform ===
Stoney Creek and its tributaries drain the north side of the mountain, The east side drains into the Molonglo River. The south side supplies Blugar Creek that runs into the Murrumbidgee River.

The summit of the mountain where the telescopes are located is elongated in a north–south direction, with a spur running to the southwest where the water treatment plant is situated.

== Observatory history ==
The first telescope installed at Mount Stromlo was the Oddie telescope which was installed on 8 September 1911. The building housing this telescope was the first construction funded by the Commonwealth Government in Canberra. In January 1913 the first telephone was connected to the Queanbeyan telephone exchange.

Mount Stromlo was devastated by the Canberra bushfires of 2003. The fire, fuelled by the pine plantation that covered the mountain, destroyed or badly damaged much of the observatory and water treatment plant.

Road access is via the Cotter Road on the south side, and Uriarra Road on the east and north. The summit is reached by a road joining Cotter Road just outside Duffy.

== Stromlo Forest Park ==
Mount Stromlo is renowned for its extensive and well-equipped mountain biking facilities. Following the 2003 bushfires, significant trail reconstruction was undertaken, resulting in over 35 kilometres (22 mi) of cross-country trails, a downhill track, and various other cycling courses. The site hosted the UCI Mountain Bike & Trials World Championships, attracting over 30,000 visitors from 40 countries. Beyond mountain biking, Stromlo Forest Park also features an event pavilion, cafe, kids' play area, road cycling circuit, running track, and equestrian trails.
