= McKnight =

McKnight (also MacKnight, Macknight) is a Scottish (Ulster-Scots) surname. It is a derivative of the surname MacNaught/McNaught.

== Notable people with the surname include ==
=== A ===
- Allen McKnight (born 1964), Northern Irish footballer
- Angela V. McKnight (born 1977), American politician
- Ann McKnight, American film editor
- Anna Caulfield McKnight (1866–1947), American lecturer
- Anne McKnight (1924–2012), American soprano
- Anthony McKnight (1954–2019), American serial killer

=== B ===
- Beeban McKnight (1897–1996), New Zealand entertainer
- Bert McKnight (1883–1961), Australian rules footballer
- Beverly McKnight, Canadian synchronized swimmer
- Bill McKnight (1940–2019), Canadian politician
- Bill McKnight (1952), American botanist-gardener
- Bob McKnight (1938–2021), Canadian ice hockey player
- Brian McKnight (born 1969), American singer-songwriter

=== C ===
- Cezar McKnight (born 1973), American politician
- Chad McKnight (born 1984), American basketball player
- Charles McKnight (1750–1791), American physician
- Cheyney McKnight, African-American historical interpreter
- Clarence E. McKnight Jr. (1929–2022), American general

=== D ===
- David McKnight (1935–2006), Canadian-British anthropologist
- Dennis McKnight (born 1959), American football player
- Denny McKnight (1848–1900), American baseball executive and manager
- Denyss McKnight (born 1982), Canadian musician
- DeWayne McKnight (born 1954), American guitarist
- Diane McKnight (born 1953), American professor
- Dodge MacKnight (1860–1950), American painter
- Dorothy McKnight, American athletic administrator

=== E ===
- Edwin T. McKnight (1869–1935), American politician

=== I ===
- Ian McKnight, Jamaican activist

=== J ===
- Jack McKnight (born 1994), West Indian footballer
- James McKnight (disambiguation), multiple people
- Jeff McKnight (born 1963), American baseball player
- Jill McKnight, Canadian politician
- Jim McKnight (1936–1994), American baseball player
- Jimmy McKnight (1923–1999), Australian rules footballer
- Joe McKnight (1988–2016), American football player
- Joe McKnight (politician) (1933–2023), American politician
- John McKnight (disambiguation), multiple people

=== K ===
- Kaila McKnight (born 1986), Australian runner
- Ken McKnight (born 1964), New Zealand cricketer

=== L ===
- Lauren McKnight (born 1988), American actress
- Linda McKnight, American bassist

=== M ===
- Marian McKnight (born 1936), American beauty pageant contestant
- Martaveous McKnight (born 1997), American basketball player
- Matt McKnight (born 1984), Canadian ice hockey player
- Mike McKnight, American keyboardist

=== P ===
- Paul McKnight (born 1977), Northern Irish footballer

=== Q ===
- Quincy McKnight (born 1995), American basketball player

=== R ===
- Reginald McKnight (born 1956), American novelist
- Rhema McKnight (born 1984), American football player
- Richard McKnight (born 1977), Scottish rugby union footballer
- Robert McKnight (1820–1885), American politician
- Robert W. McKnight (born 1944), American businessman
- Romeo McKnight (born 1998), American football player

=== S ===
- Sam McKnight (born 1955), American hairstylist
- Scot McKnight (born 1953), American theologian
- Scotty McKnight (born 1988), American football player
- Shawn McKnight (born 1968), American bishop
- Sidney McKnight (born 1955), Canadian boxer
- Sparkle McKnight (born 1991), Trinidadian athlete
- Stephanie McKnight (born 1960), American Virgin Island cyclist
- Stewart McKnight (1935–2021), New Zealand cricketer
- Sumner McKnight (born 1946), American racing driver

=== T ===
- Ted McKnight (born 1954), American football player
- Terence E. McKnight (born 1956), American naval officer
- Thomas McKnight (born 1941), American artist
- Thomas McKnight (Iowa pioneer) (1787–1865), American pioneer
- Tim McKnight, American biologist
- Tom McKnight (1868–1930), English footballer
- Tony McKnight (born 1977), American baseball player

=== W ===
- Wes McKnight (1909–1968), Canadian television personality
- William McKnight (1842–1914), American sailor
- William L. McKnight (1887–1978), American businessman
- Willie McKnight (1918–1941), Canadian aviator

== See also ==
- Senator McKnight (disambiguation), a disambiguation page for Senators surnamed "McKnight"
