= McNaught =

McNaught or MacNaught or Macnaught is a Scottish surname which is a shortened form of McNaughton. The latter surname derives from Mac Neachtain, a Gaelic patronymic for the Pictish name Nechdan meaning 'pure'. Another variant of the name is MacKnight (also Macknight and McKnight). The MacNaughts of Kilquhanty were a branch of the Clan Macnaghten.

== Notable people ==
- Anita McNaught (born 1965), British-New Zealand journalist and TV presenter
- Erin McNaught (born 1982), the 2006 Miss Australia
- Euphemia McNaught (1902–2002), Canadian painter
- Ian McNaught-Davis (fl 1950s-1980s), BBC TV presenter
- James McNaught (1870–1919), Scottish footballer, 1901 FA Cup winner with Tottenham.
- Jane Macnaught, producer of British TV soap Coronation Street
- John McNaught (1902–1970), Canadian radio broadcaster and writer
- John McNaught (1964–1997), Scottish footballer
- Johnny McNaught (1892–1972), Scottish footballer
- John Watson MacNaught (1904–1984), Canadian politician
- Judith McNaught (born 1944), American writer
- Ken McNaught (born 1955), Scottish footballer
- Kenneth McNaught (1918–1997), Canadian historian
- Robert H. McNaught (born 1956), Scottish-Australian astronomer
- William McNaught (1883-1953), English music critic and teacher, son of William Gray McNaught
- William McNaught (Glasgow) (1813–1881), engineer who compounded a beam engine
- William McNaught (Rochdale), (flourished 1840s-1870s), engineer of Petrie and McNaught, who invented a variable cut off gear and governor for a Stationary steam engine
- William Gray McNaught (1849-1918), English music critic and teacher
- William Kirkpatrick McNaught (1845–1919), Canadian politician
- Willie McNaught (1922–1989), Scottish footballer (father of Ken)

== See also ==
- 3173 McNaught, asteroid discovered in 1981
- Numerous comets discovered by Robert H. McNaught
- Comet McNaught-Russell, comet
- 130P/McNaught-Hughes, comet
- McNaught Syndicate, American newspaper syndicate founded 1922
- McKnight, a related surname
