= William McNaught =

William McNaught may refer to:

- William McNaught (Glasgow) (1813–1881), Scottish engineer
- William McNaught (Rochdale) (1811/1812-1888), English engineer
- William McNaught (1883-1953), English music teacher and music critic (son of William Gray McNaught)
- William Gray McNaught (1849–1918), English music teacher and music critic
- William Kirkpatrick McNaught (1845–1919), Canadian manufacturer and politician
- Willie McNaught (born 1922), Scottish footballer
