= 1938 Governor General's Awards =

Canadian literary award

The 1938 Governor General's Awards for Literary Merit were the third rendition of the Governor General's Awards, Canada's annual national awards program which then comprised literary awards alone. The awards recognized Canadian writers for new English-language works published in Canada during 1938 and were presented in 1939. There were no cash prizes.

There was one award in each of three established categories, which recognized English-language works only.

== Winners ==
- Fiction: Gwethalyn Graham, Swiss Sonata
- Poetry or drama: Kenneth Leslie, By Stubborn Stars
- Non-fiction: John Murray Gibbon, Canadian Mosaic
