= Eleanor Milleville =

American sculptor

Eleanor Shaw Milleville (1922-1991) was a twentieth-century American sculptor. Milleville was born in February 1922. A graduate of Simmons College (Massachusetts), she was known for her realistic sculptures in bronze. Her completed works include:

- Roberto Clemente bronze relief, Pittsburgh, Pennsylvania
- “Heather” at Children's Hospital, Pittsburgh, Pennsylvania. Heather was modeled after the artist's daughter who died at a young age.
- Memorial Plaque for Howard Bowman Stewart at Round Hill Park, Pennsylvania.
- Heroic portraits in relief at EQT Plaza, Pittsburgh, of Woodrow Wilson and Thomas G. Masaryk, in honor of the founding of the nation of Czechoslovakia.
- “A Prayer for Peace” at Fox Chapel Presbyterian Church, Pittsburgh, Pennsylvania.

Milleville died in O'Hara Township, Pennsylvania, on Tuesday, January 15, 1991.
