= James Bannerman (disambiguation) =

James Bannerman (1790–1858) was Governor of the Gold Coast.

James Bannerman may also refer to:

- James Bannerman (broadcaster) (1902–1970), Canadian radio and television broadcaster
- Hugh Bannerman (James William Hugh Bannerman, 1887–1917), New Zealand journalist, historian, cricketer and soldier
- James Bannerman (theologian) (1807–1868), Scottish theologian
