= Surya Ganguli =

Indian academic

- Born: Kolkata, India
- Citizenship: United States
- Education: University of California, Berkeley; Massachusetts Institute of Technology
- Known for: Deep Learning; Neural Networks; Optimization
- Awards: National Science Foundation CAREER Award; Simons Investigator Award; McKnight Scholarship; McDonnell Scholarship; COSYNE Top Abstract Award; Terman Award; Sloan Research Fellowship; NIPS Outstanding Paper Award; Swartz Fellowship; Burroughs-Wellcome Career Award
- Scientific career
- Fields: Theoretical Neuroscience; Theoretical Physics
- Workplaces: Stanford University
- Doctoral advisor: Petr Horava

Surya Ganguli (born Kolkata, India) is a university professor at Stanford University and a visiting research professor at Google. Ganguli is primarily known for his work on neural networks and deep learning, although he has also published papers on theoretical physics. He presently runs the Neural Dynamics and Computation Lab at Stanford, where he aims to reverse engineer how networks of neurons and synapses cooperate across multiple scales of space and time to facilitate sensory perception, motor control, memory, and other cognitive functions. He is also known for being a prolific public speaker and lecturer, having been invited to give over 200 talks at various universities, institutes, workshops, conferences, and symposiums since 2005.

Ganguli has received numerous awards for his work in the field including a National Science Foundation CAREER Award, the Simons Investigator Award in MMLS, the McKnight Scholar Award, the James S. McDonnell Foundation Scholar Award in Human Cognition, a Sloan Research Fellowship, a Swartz Fellowship, the Burroughs Wellcome Career Award at the Scientific Interface, and the Terman Award. His publications have also won a number of conference awards, such as the NIPS 2014 Outstanding Paper award and the Cosyne 2014 award for the top ranked abstract. Finally, Ganguli has won a number of awards unrelated to his academic publications, such as the Berkeley Outstanding Graduate Instructor award and the National Council of Teachers of English Award in Writing.

== Biography ==
In 1993, Surya Ganguli graduated from University High School in Irvine, California, at the top of his class at the age of 16. He then attended the Massachusetts Institute of Technology, where he spent five years completing bachelor's degrees in mathematics, physics, and electrical engineering and computer science, as well as a master's degree in the latter. During that time, Ganguli assumed research positions at the Information Mechanics Group at the MIT Laboratory for Computer Science, at the Center for Space Research and the Center for Theoretical Physics at the MIT Department of Physics, and the Information Systems and Technologies Laboratory and the Dynamics of Computation Group at the Xerox Palo Alto Research Center.

Ganguli then moved on to the University of California, Berkeley, where he completed a master's degree in physics in 2000 and a master's degree in mathematics in 2004. He also completed a PhD in string theory under Dr. Petr Horava at the Lawrence Berkeley National Laboratory later that year. While at Berkeley, he taught undergraduate courses on quantum mechanics, special relativity, statistical physics, electromagnetism, and analytical mechanics.

Following the completion of his doctorate, Ganguli became a postdoctoral fellow at the University of California, San Francisco, a position he held until 2012. He had authored and co-authored a number of papers on theoretical neuroscience prior to this in the late 2000s (collaborating with Haim Sompolinsky, Peter Latham, and Ken Miller in the process) and further taught a course on advanced theoretical neuroscience with Larry Abbott, Stefano Fusi, and Ken Miller in 2008, but it was at this point that Ganguli formally transitioned into theoretical neuroscience, assuming the position at the Sloan-Swartz Center for Theoretical Neurobiology.

As of 2012, Ganguli is an assistant professor at the department of applied physics, the department of neurobiology, the department of computer science, and the department of electrical engineering at Stanford University. In 2017, he also assumed a visiting research professorship at Google's Google Brain Deep Learning Team.

== Select publications ==
Surya Ganguli has an extensive publication record. A selection of works is listed below:

- Dauphin, Yann N; Pascanu, Razvan; Gulcehre, Caglar; Cho, Kyunghyun; Ganguli, Surya; Bengio, Yoshua (2014). Ghahramani, Z.; Welling, M.; Cortes, C.; Lawrence, N. D.; Weinberger, K. Q. (eds.). Identifying and attacking the saddle point problem in high-dimensional non-convex optimization (PDF). Curran Associates, Inc. pp. 2933–2941.
- Saxe, Andrew M.; McClelland, James L.; Ganguli, Surya (2014-02-19). "Exact solutions to the nonlinear dynamics of learning in deep linear neural networks". arXiv:1312.6120 [cs.NE].
- Piech, Chris; Bassen, Jonathan; Huang, Jonathan; Ganguli, Surya; Sahami, Mehran; Guibas, Leonidas J; Sohl-Dickstein, Jascha (2015). Cortes, C.; Lawrence, N. D.; Lee, D. D.; Sugiyama, M.; Garnett, R. (eds.). Deep Knowledge Tracing (PDF). Curran Associates, Inc. pp. 505–513.
- "On the expressive power of deep neural networks". Icml'17. Proceedings of the 34th International Conference on Machine Learning - Volume 70. 6 August 2017: 2847–2854.
- Boyda, Edward K.; Ganguli, Surya; Hořava, Petr; Varadarajan, Uday (2003-05-19). "Holographic protection of chronology in universes of the G\"odel type". Physical Review D. 67 (10) 106003. arXiv:hep-th/0212087. Bibcode:2003PhRvD..67j6003B. doi:10.1103/PhysRevD.67.106003. S2CID 6502289.

== Notable awards ==
- Simons Investigator Award in MMLS
- McKnight Scholar Award
- James S. McDonnell Foundation Scholar Award in Human Cognition
- Cosyne 2014, Number 1 Ranked abstract
- NIPS 2014 Outstanding paper award
- Terman Award
- Burroughs Wellcome Career Award at the Scientific Interface
- Sloan Research Fellowship
- Berkeley Outstanding Graduate Instructor
- National Council of Teachers of English Award in Writing
- NSF Career Award
- Swartz Fellowship
