= Robert Lawton =

Robert Lawton may refer to:

- Robert B. Lawton (born 1947), American Jesuit and president of Loyola Marymount University
- Robert M. Lawton (1931–2021), American businessman and politician
- Robert O. Lawton (1924–1980), professor at Florida State University
- Rob Lawton (born 1964), Australian rugby union player
