= Nevin S. Scrimshaw =

American food scientist

Nevin Stewart Scrimshaw
- Born: January 20, 1918; Milwaukee, Wisconsin, United States
- Died: February 8, 2013 (aged 95); Thornton, New Hampshire
- Education: Harvard University (Ph.D., M.P.H.) 1941; University of Rochester (M.D.) 1945
- Known for: Research on human nutritional deficiency
- Children: Susan C. Scrimshaw
- Awards: World Food Prize (1991)
- Scientific career
- Fields: Nutrition and food science
- Website: Nevin Scrimshaw International Nutrition Foundation http://www.inffoundation.org/

Nevin Stewart Scrimshaw (January 20, 1918 – February 8, 2013) was an American food scientist and Institute Professor emeritus at the Massachusetts Institute of Technology. Scrimshaw was born in Milwaukee, Wisconsin. During the course of his long career he developed nutritional supplements for alleviating protein, iodine, and iron deficiencies in the developing world. His pioneering and extensive publications in the area of human nutrition and food science include over 20 books and monographs and hundreds of scholarly articles. Scrimshaw also founded the Department of Nutrition and Food Science at the Massachusetts Institute of Technology, the Institute of Nutrition of Central America and Panama, and the Nevin Scrimshaw International Nutrition Foundation. He was awarded the Bolton L. Corson Medal in 1976 and the World Food Prize in 1991. Scrimshaw spent the last years of his life on a farm in Thornton, New Hampshire, where he died at 95.

== Life ==
Scrimshaw came from New England, and spent the 1930s and 1940s there studying nutrition, especially protein combining, alongside his wife and fellow scientist, Mary Goodrich. In the 1950s and 1960s, they lived in Guatemala and India. They designed meals using local vegetables to fight against the scourge of kwashiorkor. In Guatemala they used the combination of cottonseed flour with maize, while in India they combined peanut flour with wheat. His daughter is medical anthropologist and academic administrator Susan C. Scrimshaw.

== Works ==
- 1968: (with John Everett Gordon) Malnutrition, learning and behavior, MIT Press
- 1968: (with Carl E. Taylor and John Everett Gordon) Interactions of nutrition and infection, World Health Organization Monograph #57
- 1971: (with Alan Berg & David L. Call) Nutrition, national planning and development, MIT Press
- 1971: (editor with Aaron M. Altschul) Amino acid fortification of protein foods, MIT Press
- 1974: (editor with Moises Behar) Nutrition and agricultural development: significance and potential for the tropics, Institute of Nutrition of Central America and Panama, Plenum Press
- 1975: (with Max Milner & Daniel I. C. Wang) Protein resources and technology, Avi Publishing
- 1982: (with Mitchel B. Wallerstein) Nutrition policy implementation: issues and experience, Plenum Press

== Awards and honours ==
- American Medical Association/Joseph B. Goldberger Award in Clinical Nutrition, 1969
- Institute of Food Technologists Bor S. Luh International Award, 1969 (known then as the IFT International Award)
- member, National Academy of Sciences, 1971
- American Society for Nutrition/Conrad Elvehjem Award for Public Service in Nutrition, 1976
- Bolton S. Corson Medal, 1976
- Fellow of the American Institute of Nutrition, 1985
- Bristol-Myers Award for Distinguished Achievements in Nutrition Research, 1988
- World Food Prize, 1991
