= Stephen A. Webb =

Australian academic

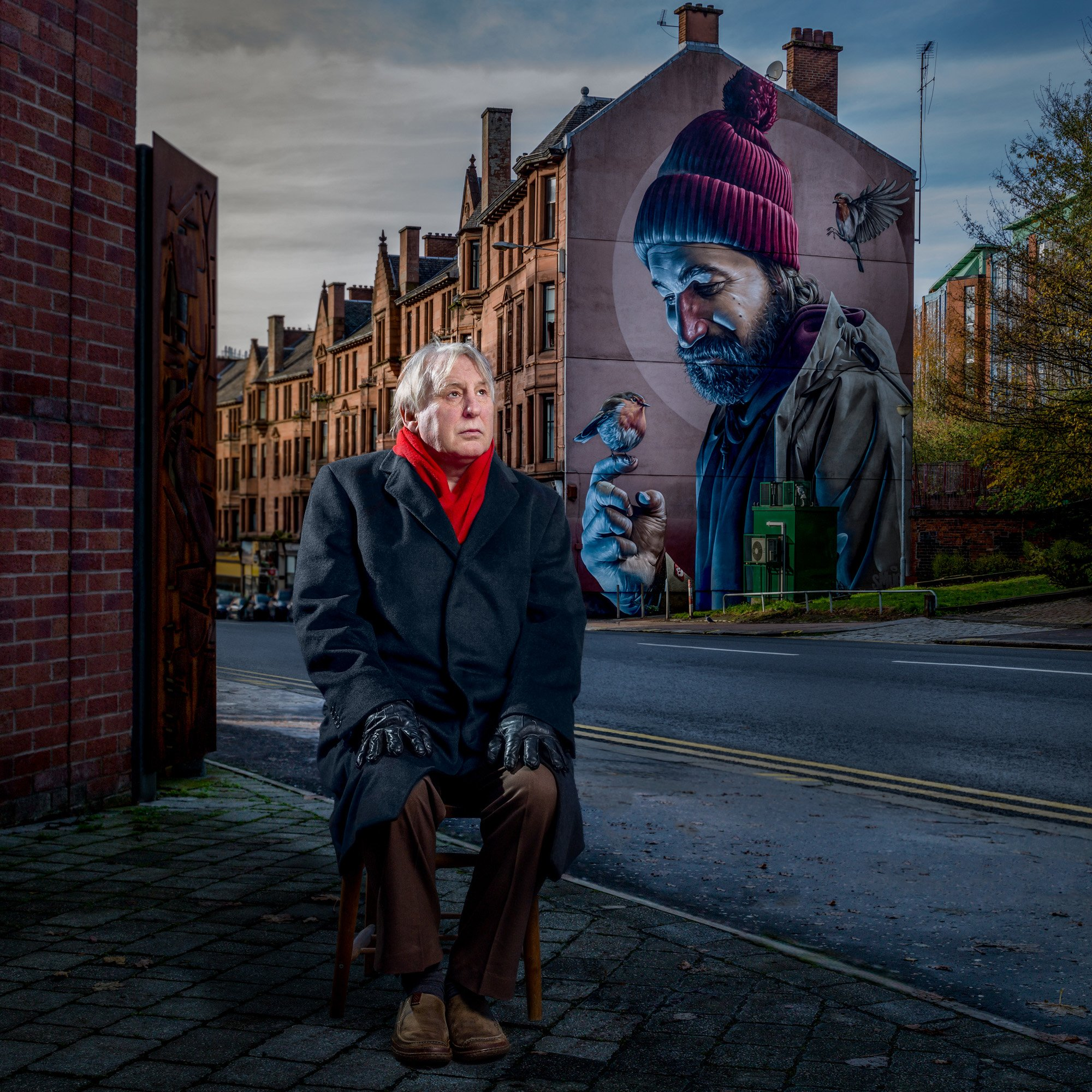
- Born: 28 November 1958 (age 67); Margate, Kent, England

Philosophical work
- Era: Theorising social work
- Region: Social work and sociology
- School: Critical social work
- Main interests: Critical theory, Continental philosophy, inter-disciplinary social sciences
- Notable ideas: Biopolitics, Evidence-based practice, New Social Work Left, ethics and value perspectives, history of social work, theories of intervention

Stephen A. Webb (born 28 November 1958) is a social theorist and researcher in social work, social welfare and policy. He was born in Margate Kent, in 1958, the son of Mary and Philip Webb and has a younger brother Richard and sister Nicola Webb. He attended Heath Junior School, Chesterfield Boys Grammar School and University of Oxford.

Stephen is Professorial Fellow and previously worked as Professor of Social Work at Glasgow Caledonian University in Scotland and Assistant Vice Principal for Community and Public Engagement. In 2018 he was awarded to Fellowship of the Academy of Social Sciences (FAcSS) which is an award granted by the Academy of Social Sciences to leading academics, policy-makers, and practitioners of the social sciences. Previously he was Professor of Human Sciences and Director of the Research Institute for Social Inclusion and Wellbeing, University of Newcastle, New South Wales, Australia, and Professorial Fellow at the University of Sussex. Prior to this he was Reader at University of Sussex. He has held visiting Professorships in Netherlands, Germany, Portugal and Lithuania and was awarded a DAAD Visiting Professorship at the Bielefeld University, Germany.

He is author of several highly cited books including Social Work in a Risk Society (Palgrave, 2006) and Evidence-based Social Work: A Critical Stance (with Gray & Plath, Routledge, 2009). He is co-editor (with Gray) of Social Work Theories and Methods (Sage, 2008), the four-volume international reference work International Social Work (Sage, 2010), Ethics and Value Perspectives in Social Work (Palgrave, 2010). He has completed (with Gray and Midgley) The Handbook of Social Work for Sage, which is the world's first major international reference work in this field. Webb's critical analysis, Some considerations on the validity of evidence-based practice in social work, is the world's most highly cited article in the field and the most influential publication in social work over the last ten years. His highly acclaimed The New Politics of Critical Social Work was published in 2013 for Palgrave and the second edition of Social Work Theories and Methods for Sage, London, has been translated into Korean and Polish. Professor Webb published two international reference works for Routledge on critical social work including the Routledge Handbook of Critical Social Work (2019) and Routledge Handbook of International Critical Social Work (2023) in which he develops the importance of biopolitical theory for social work. Stephen Webb is regarded internationally as the leading theorist in critical social work and one of the most highly cited social work researchers in the field.

== Publications ==
=== Authored books ===
- Webb, Stephen A.; Gray, Mel; Plath, Debbie (2009). Evidence-based social work: a critical stance. London New York: Routledge. ISBN 9780415468237.
- Webb, Stephen (2006). Social work in a risk society: social and political perspectives. Basingstoke England New York: Palgrave Macmillan. ISBN 9780333963616.

=== Edited books ===
- Webb, Stephen A.; Harlow, Elizabeth, eds. (2003). Information and communication technologies in the welfare services. London Philadelphia, Pennsylvania: Jessica Kingsley Publishers. ISBN 9781843100492.
- Webb, Stephen A.; Gray, Mel, eds. (2009). Social work: theories and methods. Los Angeles London: Sage. ISBN 9781412947411.
- Webb, Stephen A.; Gray, Mel, eds. (2009). Social work: theories and methods (2nd ed.). Los Angeles London: Sage. ISBN 9781412947411.
- Webb, Stephen A.; Gray, Mel, eds. (2010). Ethics and value perspectives in social work. Houndmills, Basingstoke, Hampshire New York: Palgrave Macmillan. ISBN 9780230221451.
- Webb, Stephen A.; Gray, Mel, eds. (2010). International social work: Volume 1–4. Los Angeles: Sage. ISBN 9781847875631.
- Webb, Stephen A.; Gray, Mel, eds. (2012). The Sage Handbook of Social Work. Los Angeles: Sage. ISBN 9781849207515.
- Webb, Stephen A.; Gray, Mel, eds. (2013). The New Politics of Critical Social Work. New York, N.Y: Palgrave Macmillan. ISBN 9780230296787.
- Webb, Stephen A., ed. (2017). Professional Identity and Social Work. New York: Routledge. ISBN 9781138234437.
- Webb, Stephen A., ed. (2019). The Routledge Handbook of Critical Social Work. New York: Routledge. ISBN 9781138578432.
- Webb, Stephen A., ed. (2023). The Routledge Handbook of International Critical Social Work. New York: Routledge. ISBN 9781032078908.

=== Recent Articles ===
2024 Does social work really want to dance with zombies? A reply to Lynch and Wilson, Social Work & Society, Vol.21, No.2

       Social Work & Society (uni-wuppertal.de)

2022 The empowerment of informal female workers: A case study for social work intervention in Tehran province (with Fatemeh Jaafari & Sarah Aryaee),

       British Journal of Social Work, bcac029, https://doi.org/10.1093/bjsw/bcac029

2021 Urban blue spaces and human health: A systematic review and meta-analysis of quantitative studies, (with Smith, N., et al.), Cities, Volume 119,

       ISSN 0264-2751.

2020 ‘Social work and “the social”: A biopolitical perspective’, Issues in Social Work (Zeszyty Pracy Socjalnej), Volume 25, Issue 3, pp. 163-177 https://ejournals.eu/czasopismo/zeszyty-pracy-socjalnej/artykul/social-work- and-the-social-a-biopolitical-perspective

2020 ‘Why agential realism matters to social work’, British Journal of Social Work, bcaa106, https://doi.org/10.1093/bjsw/bcaa106, Published: 02 September 2020

2019 ‘What the public think of social services: A view from Scotland’ (with P. McCulloch), British Journal of Social Work, Volume 50, Issue 4,

        pp.1146–1166. https://doi.org/10.1093/bjsw/bcz090 (Editor’s Choice article)
