= Critical social work =

Critical theory applied to social work

Critical social work is the application to social work of a critical theory perspective. Critical social work seeks to address social injustices, as opposed to focusing on individualized issues. Critical theories explain social problems as arising from various forms of oppression and injustice in globalized capitalist societies and forms of neoliberal governance. This approach to social work theory is formed by a polyglot of theories from across the humanities and social sciences, borrowing from various schools of thought, including anarchism, anti-capitalism, anti-racism, Marxism, feminism, biopolitics, and social democracy.

== Introduction ==
Social workers have an ethical commitment to working to overcome inequality and oppression. For radical social workers, this implies working towards the transformation of capitalist society towards building social arrangements which are more compatible with these commitments. Mullaly & Keating (1991) suggest three schools of radical thought corresponding to three versions of socialist analysis; social democracy, eurocommunist, and revolutionary Marxism. However, they work in institutional contexts which paradoxically implicates them in maintaining capitalist functions. Social work theories have three possible strategies of analysis, as identified by Rojek et al. (1986). These are:

- The progressive position. Social work is seen as a catalyst for social change. Social workers work with the oppressed and marginalized and so are in a good position to harness class resistance to capitalism and transform society into a more social democracy or socialist state. ( Bailey & Brake, 1975, Galper, 1975, Simpkin, 1979, Ginsberg, 1979)
- The reproductive position. Social work is seen as an indispensable tool of the capitalist social order. Its function is to produce and maintain the capitalist state machine and to ensure working class subordination. Social workers are the ‘soft cops’ of the capitalist state machine. (Althusser, 1971, Poulantzas, 1975, Donzelot, 1976, Muller & Neususs, 1978, Webb, 2016)
- The contradictory position. Social work can undermine capitalism and class society. While it acts as an instrument of class control it can simultaneously create the conditions for the overthrow of capitalist social relations. (Corrigan & Leonard, Phillipson, 1979, Bolger, 1981)

The fourth strategy of analysis Biopolitics identified in the field of critical social work is

- The biopolitical perspective. Social work is regarded as a key functioning part of biopolitical operations of power or the reproductive manifestation of the biopolitical modern State (Webb 2019 and Webb, 2023). Drawing on the writings of Foucault, Agamben and Esposito "Biopolitics links control and political command with risk factors of statistically produced populations as a distinctive form of power. In contrast to disciplining, biopolitics turns power's grasp from the coercive control of the individual subject to “life itself ” (Clough 2008). Stephen A. Webb is a main contributor to the biopolitical perspective which is linked to critical social work. Two major international reference works Webb, Stephen A., ed. (2019). The Routledge Handbook of Critical Social Work. New York: Routledge. ISBN 9781138578432. and Webb, Stephen A., ed. (2023). The Routledge Handbook of International Critical Social Work. New York: Routledge. ISBN 9781032078908. make a significant international and inter-disciplinary contribution to this perspective. Webb argues that "biopolitics now has a guaranteed status as the primary framework of analysis for critical social work" (2023:11) and "we should concentrate our efforts on theorising power from the vantage point of biopolitical theory" (ibid.)

== History ==
Critical social work is heavily influenced by Marxism, the Frankfurt School of Critical Theory and by the earlier approach of Radical social work, which was focused on class oppression. Critical social work evolved from this to oppose all forms of oppression. Several writers helped codify radical social work, such as Jeffry Galper (1975), Mike Brake (1975) and Harold Throssell (1975). They were building on the views expounded by earlier social workers such as Octavia Hill, Jane Addams & Bertha Reynolds, who had at various points over the previous 200 years sought to make social work & charity more focused on structural forces. More recently writers such as Stephen A. Webb, Iain Ferguson, Susan White, Lena Dominelli, Paul Michael-Garrett, and Stan Houston have further developed the paradigm by incorporating inter-disciplinary ideas from contemporary political philosophy, anthropology and social theory. These include the ideas of Michel Foucault, Jacques Donzelot, Gilles Deleuze, Judith Butler, Pierre Bourdieu, Antonio Gramsci and Jürgen Habermas. For the last decade and since 2010 the writings of Italian political philosophers such as Giorgio Agamben and Roberto Esposito, especially their theorizing about community, states of exception, destituent politics, affirmative biopolitics and governance have come to the fore in critical social work. This influenced a critical engagement of the relationship between social work and the COVID-19 pandemic.

A journal published by Policy Press called Critical and Radical Social Work: An international journal promotes debate and scholarship around a range of engaged social work themes and issues. The journal publishes papers which seek to analyze and respond to issues, such as the impact of global neo-liberalism on social welfare; austerity and social work; social work and social movements; social work, inequality and oppression. Stephen A. Webb was commissioned by Routledge to edit a major international reference work 'A Handbook of Critical Social Work' (due for publication 2018). Webb published 'The New Politics of Social Work' in 2013 written closely in the tradition of critical social work (also see Webb, 2019, and 2023)

== Focus ==
Major themes that critical social work seeks to address are:

- Poverty, unemployment and social exclusion
- Racism and other forms of discrimination relating to disability, age and gender.
- Inadequacies in housing, health care and education and workplace opportunities
- Crime and social unrest (although the critical approach would be more focused on the structural causes than the behaviour itself)
- Abuse and exploitation
- The inhumane impacts of neoliberalism and austerity capitalism such as the introduction of food banks and precarious zero hours work.

== Sub-theories ==
As critical social work grew out of radical social work, it split into various theories. They are listed below, with a selection of writers who have influenced the theory.

- Structural social work theory ( Ann Davis, Maurice Moreau, Robert Mullaly)
- Anti-discriminatory and anti-oppressive social work theory (Neil Thompson, Dalrymple & Burke)
- Postcolonial social work theory (Linda Briskman)
- New structural social work theory (Robert Mullaly)
- Critical social work theory (Jan Fook, Karen Healy, Stephen A. Webb, Bob Pease, Paul Michael Garrett)
- Radical social work theory (Mike Brake, Iain Ferguson)

== Structural and Dialectic critiques of human agency ==
While critical social work has a strong commitment to structural change, it does not discount the role of agency, albeit a constrained form of potential. Critical analysis in social work looks at competing forces such as the capitalist economic system, the welfare state as all affecting individual choices. Therefore, according to the critical theory, the aim of social work is to emancipate people from oppression and allow a critique of the ideology of "operativity", State law and governance. Critical social work takes a stance against common assumptions about the necessity of work, capitalist labor and managerial systems of control.

"A dialectical approach to social work avoids the simplistic linear cause-effect notion of historical materialism and the naïve romanticism associated with the notion of totally free human will." (Mullaly and Keating, 1991). "Dialectical analysis helps to illuminate the complex interplay between people and the world around them and to indicate the role of social work within society" (Mullaly, 2007:241).

== Critical Practice models ==
Various practice theories influence critical social work including:

- Working collectively and recognizing that "community" emerges temporarily around issues and matters of concern.
- Relationship based social work (Sue White and Brigid Featherstone)
- Finding ways in which community, cooperation and consciousness can empower disadvantaged people
- Helping people to understand the social consequences of the market system, neo liberalism and the economisation of life
- Helping people deal collectively with social issues rather than individualising them
- Making alliances with working class organisations and recognise social workers as 'workers' themselves
- Civil disobedience, such as the intentional and surreptitious violation of agency policies that perpetuate capitalist oppression
