= Anti-oppressive practice =

Anti-oppressive practice is an interdisciplinary approach primarily rooted within the practice of social work that focuses on ending socioeconomic oppression. It requires the practitioner to critically examine the power imbalance inherent in an organizational structure with regard to the larger sociocultural and political context in order to develop strategies for creating an egalitarian environment free from oppression, racism, and other forms of discrimination in the larger society, by engaging at the legal and political level. In general community practice it is about responding to oppression by dominant groups and individuals. In social services it regulates any possible oppressive practices and helps in delivering welfare services in an inclusive manner.

== Introduction ==
Anti-oppressive practice seeks to lessen the exclusion of certain social groups from social equality, rights and social justice. Social work generally is known to be a "caring" profession, but sometimes services provided that work for one person do not necessarily work for another or reflect the sensitivity required to work for another. Related to this is a "care versus control" issue, because where there is care there is responsibility, and therefore control and power which can lead to exclusions (Humphries, 2004, p. 105). Knowingly and deliberately causing discrimination to another constitutes an oppressive practice, the behavior also matters as much as intent. The onus of the social worker is to exercise due diligence according to generally accepted practices and to behave in a manner generally accepted by society which constitutes as neutral/ordinary "humanity".

An imbalance in care and control of services may lead to oppression. Lena Dominelli (2002) defines oppression as "relations that divide people into dominant or superior groups and subordinate or inferior ones. These relations of domination consist of the systematic devaluing of the attributes and contributions of those deemed inferior, and their exclusion from the social resources available to those in the dominant group" (e.g. xenophobia). The exclusion that results from oppression or vice versa can affect an individual or a system greatly. This often evolves from an evaluative process, where individuals ends up measuring themselves in a hierarchy against the other based on the personal values they hold. Disposing to this, results in one's identity or trait being regarded as superior to the other, thus creating an "us-them" dynamic (othering process) resulting in division and which creates risk for oppression.

== Anti-oppressive model ==
In social work, the anti-oppressive model aims to function and promote equal, non-oppressive social relations between various identities. Dominelli (2002) defines it, "in challenging established truths about identity, anti-oppressive practice seeks to subvert the stability of universalized biological representations of social division to both validate diversity and enhance solidarity based on celebrating difference amongst peoples" (p. 39). It remains dedicated to principles of social justice, which is also upheld in BASW values, by acknowledging diversity within oppression and considering the intersection and hierarchies of the "isms" that construct people as victims or perpetrators. The anti-oppressive model analyzes and advocates against macro & micro levels of oppression and emphasizes on social justice and social change along more empowering and emancipatory lines.

The complex and unequal role of "power" and "isms" are considered as an immense complication in anti-oppressive practice. Those who benefit, as in most relationships, are those with most power. Thompson argues that there are essentially three stacks of barriers in anti-oppressive practice. They are personal (P), cultural (C) and structural (S). P refers to personal and prejudice factors. C refers to culture, commonalities, consensus and conformity. S refers to Structural aspects like sociopolitical force or other social dimensions. Thompson refers to P being embedded in C and C in S, interacting with each other in continuum. Anti-Oppressive Practice seeks to identify strategies to construct power in a way that will address the systemic inequalities that are operating simultaneously at the individual, group and institutional level to oppose the production and reproduction of oppression.

Personal / Individual Oppression: Personal / Individual Oppression includes the values, beliefs and feelings held by individuals that affect interpersonal relationships. According to Dominelli (2002, p. 6), anti-oppression is “a methodology focusing on both process and outcome, and a way of structuring relationships between individuals that aim to empower users by reducing the negative effects of hierarchy in their immediate interaction and the work they do together.”

Cultural Oppression: Language has a contribution to oppression in general, language with its marking function constructs social structure and an interplay in creating cultural values. Government records categorize people who are neither white or male, as ethnic presuming white people do not have an ethnicity but are the norm, and white people are often "de-raced" in discourses.

Structural / Institutional Oppression:

In 2004 Humphries stated failure to critically analyse legislation's and social policy led "failure to identify the inherent racism within immigration" systems, an example of structural oppression.

In community practices, anti-oppressive practice functions to address problems that rise due to structural imbalance; Herbert Marcuse defined the state as: "Law and order are always and everywhere the law and order which protect the established hierarchy; it is nonsensical to invoke the absolute authority of this law and this order against those who suffer from it and struggle against it."

Professional practitioners are aware of the power (im)balance between service users and providers that reflects in practice, though the aim is always using this differences legitimately to empower others and reduce the experience of powerlessness and the resulting learned helplessness or the "culture of silence". Lois McNay in 1992 commented on this power (im)balance as "Oppressions have always dominated on how our lives are lived, they are central to the profit base of the economy. The big three of them are gender, race and class". McNay cites exploitive division of labour as an example.

Social work solutions to the problems of oppressed groups by model should include policies that address all elements of oppression. However, Social workers also have to be aware that these efforts may not be necessarily supported by partners in the process of social justice.

== Nature ==
Through anti-oppressive practice social work practice focuses on a more emancipatory form of practice which locates the individual people and their family within their social contexts and helps them with structural patterns of the society that perpetuate inequalities through promotion of choices.

When discussing things with service users, practitioners can use jargon, abbreviations, and legal terms which may create unnecessary barriers by reinforcing power differences between the service user and the practitioner.

Anti-oppressive practice is a part of professional social work development schema. They are bonded by this to develop counter-hegemonic understanding of cross-cultural and personal differences. Social work practitioners advocate against oppression by promoting increased respect for the "inherent dignity and worth of all people", and "social justice" (NASW, 1996). Acknowledging NASW values, along with "the importance of human relationships," remains an integral part of building empowering client-practitioner relationships (NASW, 1996).

== See also ==
- Critical social work
- Drapetomania
- Harm reduction model
- Internalized oppression
- Youth engagement
