= Strength-based practice =

Social work practice theory

Strength-based practice is a social work practice theory that emphasizes people's self-determination and strengths. It is a philosophy and a way of viewing clients (originally psychological patients, but in an extended sense also employees, colleagues or other persons) as resourceful and resilient in the face of adversity. It is client-led, with a focus on future outcomes and strengths that people bring to a problem or crisis. When applied beyond the field of social work, strength-based practice is also referred to as the "strength-based approach", including strength-based leadership and strength-based learning communities. This approach can focus on individuals’ strengths as well as wider social and community networks.

== History ==
Social worker Bertha Reynolds was a proto-theorist for this practice. She criticized the American social work tendency to adopt a psychoanalytic approach (and the corollary dependence on the DSM IV) with clients. It was formally developed by a team from the University of Kansas, including Dennis Saleebey, Charles Rapp, and Ann Weick.

In 1997, Charles Rapp wrote "The Strengths Model", which focused on "amplifying the well part of the patient". The popularity of his approach spread quickly, and, in 1999, Dr. Martin Seligman, the president of the American Psychological Association at the time, made an observation that fueled strength-based practice:

The most important thing we learned was that psychology was half-baked. We've baked the part about mental illness, about repair damage. The other side's unbaked, the side of strength, the side of what we're good at.

Since then, the strength-based approach has been adapted and applied to many contexts. In the service sector, for example, it has been applied to case management, education, community development, and working with many different groups, such as young people and people with mental illnesses. Beyond social services, in 1995, Marcus Buckingham and Donald Clifton introduced the strengths perspective to the business world.

== Key elements ==
The strength-based approach is often referred to as a response to more deficit-focused or pathological approaches. For example, Erik Laursen and Laura Nissen noted that in the field of youth justice, the mainstream corrections model focuses on risks, needs and addressing weaknesses. Alternatively, the strength-based approach enhances strengths and builds on characteristics that are already present in individuals.

Although applied differently depending on the population and service, the approach has been characterized as a philosophy or lens through which people are viewed and through which programs and agencies operate. According to Diane Powell and Catherine Batsche, a strength-based philosophy is a critical belief, an all-pervasive attitude that informs a professional's interactions with clients. Ideally, an entire agency will adopt the approach, and, through ongoing training, this attitude-change will occur in all staff, transforming the way they view their work, their colleagues, and the people and communities they work with.

This strength-based philosophy holds the core belief that all individuals have strengths and resources. The focus of the practice is on a person's skills, interests, and support systems. Its simple premise is to identify what is going well, how to do more of it, and how to build on it.

=== Six hallmarks of strength-based practice ===
The following are six criteria that should be demonstrated in strength-based practice: 1. Goal-oriented: In goal attainment, clients are encouraged to set the goals they want to achieve in their lives. 2. Systematic strength assessment: A set of protocols is followed in assessing and documenting strengths. Assessing the problem is avoided. The current situation is also emphasized but the past may be looked into for possible assets, talents, and resources. 3. Rich environment: It is important that the environment is filled with resources. Resources, support, people, and opportunities are sourced primarily from the natural community. 4. Explicit methods for goal attainment: The methods described include identifying strengths, resources, goals, roles, and responsibilities, and relating them to each other. 5. Hope-inducing relationship: The relationship should be able to increase hope, opportunities, confidence, and the client’s perceptions of their abilities. It should also be purposeful, empathetic, and accepting. 6. Meaningful choices and authority to choose: The process of goal-setting, acquiring resources, identifying responsibilities, etc. is directed by the client with confidence and authority while the professional or worker extends and clarifies the client’s choices.

=== Strength-based practice in Occupational Therapy ===
Occupational therapy (OT) helps individuals to develop, regain, or improve skills they need to participate in daily activities they want to, need to, or enjoy participating in.

In OT, using a strength-based approach is seen as essential when working with individuals with autism spectrum disorder (ASD) With this approach, all aspects, behaviors, and characteristics of an individual are seen as positive features This approach focuses on the individual's strengths, abilities, and potential instead of their weaknesses, deficit, or inability to complete tasks. However, the use of this approach does not mean that possible challenges and struggles are dismissed. It directs individuals to the good days and their achievements and allows them to accept and embrace differences, adopting values of a social model, instead of emphasizing deficits, just as a medical model does This lets children in the spectrum create a voice and identity they can be proud of. Dunn provides three steps to the use of this approach:

1. Identify the individual’s strengths through observation, interviews, or assessment like a strengths test.
2. Build upon these strengths by incorporating them into activities and provide increased opportunities for them to use their strengths daily.
3. Celebrate the individual’s success no matter how small to help them feel confident and motivated to learn more.

When working with children, an occupational therapist will help the child to learn, play, and use play to learn.

== Outcomes ==
Evaluation of the effectiveness of the strength-based approach is limited; however, some studies have shown that working with individuals and communities through a strength lens improves individual outcomes, such as quality of life, employment, and health. On a more societal level, a strength-based approach promotes positive views of individuals and takes focus away from blame or judgement. This alternative view may contribute to de-stigmatization of certain groups and may increase positive political attention and social support. Overall, there is a need for more research and further evaluations of the strength-based approach.

== See also ==
- Management cybernetics
