= John McKnight =

John McKnight may refer to:

- John McKnight (English footballer) (fl. 1880s–1890s), English footballer
- John McKnight (Scottish footballer) (fl. 1910-1915), see List of Bury F.C. players (1–24 appearances)
- John McKnight (coach) (fl. 1920s), American football and basketball coach
- John McKnight (Gaelic footballer) (1931–2017), Northern Irish Gaelic footballer
- John G. McKnight (1931–2022), American engineer
