= Sophronia Maria Elliott =

American home economist (1854–1942)

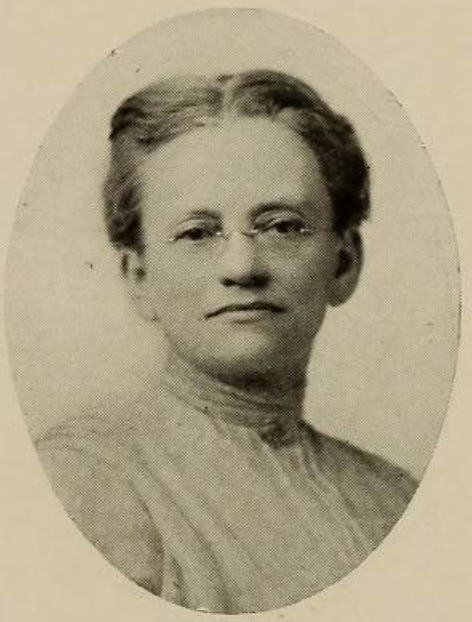
- Elliott, from the 1913 yearbook of Simmons College
- Born: February 18, 1854; Baldwinsville, Massachusetts, U.S.
- Died: March 14, 1942 (aged 88)
- Occupations: Home economist, textbook writer

Sophronia Maria Elliott (February 18, 1854 – March 14, 1942), known as S. Maria Elliott, was an American home economist, educator and writer. Her 1907 textbook Household Bacteriology is considered a notable early text in the field. She was a professor at Simmons College in Boston.

== Early life and education ==
Elliott was born in Baldwinsville, Massachusetts, the daughter of Moses Elliott and Sarah Tenney Elliott. Her mother died in 1857, when Elliott was a small child.

== Career ==
Elliott was an educator and home economist who taught at the Boston School of Housekeeping and at Simmons College, and wrote about hygiene and bacteriology in the home. In 1905 she taught in Cornell University's free winter course for farm women. In 1914 she received an honorary master's degree from Brown University. In 1924 she spoke at Massachusetts Agricultural College's Farm and Home Week.

== Publications ==
- Household Bacteriology (1904)
- Household Hygiene (1907)
- "The Teaching of Methods of Housewifery in Secondary Schools" (1910)
- The Chemistry of Cooking and Cleaning (1910, with Ellen Swallow Richards)
- "How Rough Places Are Made Smooth" (1911)
- Handbook of Housekeeping (1912, with Bertha M. Terrill and Isabel Bevier)
- The Business of the Household (1918, with Clarence Wilbur Taber, William A. Durgin, Ninian H. Welch, and Mary B. Stocking)

== Personal life ==
Elliott died in 1942, at the age of 88. There is a collection of her papers at Virginia Tech's Newman Library.
