= Bertha Reynolds =

American social worker (1885–1978)

Bertha Capen Reynolds (December 11, 1885 – October 29, 1978) was an American social worker who was influential in the creation of strength-based practice, radical social work and critical social work, among others.

== Early life and education ==
Bertha Capen Reynolds born in Brockton, Massachusetts, on December 11, 1887, to Mary (Capen) Reynolds and Franklin Stewart Reynolds. Her father died while she was a young child, and she moved with her mother to Boston to work as a teacher.

Reynolds' great aunt, Bessie T. Capen, paid for her to attend Smith College, where she graduated in 1908 with a Bachelor of Social Work. She suffered from an unknown illness during this time. In 1912–1913, Reynolds enrolled in the Boston School for Social Workers (later known as the Simmons College School of Social Work.) She graduated in 1914 with a second Social Work degree. At this time, she described her professional goals as "...a desire to help poor people and the Negro and to be able to earn her living."

== Career ==
After her graduation, she worked for a short time at the North End Health Clinic. In 1917 Smith College began running a psychiatric social work degree, and she enrolled.

1919 saw the publication of a monograph, The Selection of Foster Homes for Children, with Mary S. Doran. From 1919 until 1923, she worked as director of social services at Danvers State Hospital in Massachusetts. From 1923 until 1925, Reynolds worked in new clinics for behavioral training of pre-school children in the Division of Mental Hygiene in Boston.

In 1925, Reynolds returned to Smith, now serving as associate director of the Smith College School for Social Work, teaching courses in the summer term and supervising students' field placements during the rest of the year; conducted research and had clinical assignments at the Child Guidance Clinic in Philadelphia and at the Institute for Child Guidance and the Jewish Board of Guardians in New York. In 1935, her position at Smith changed, and she became the associate director in charge of advanced courses. This year, Reynolds established and taught the first advanced course, Plan D, for the training of supervisors and teachers of social work.

During this period she used Marxist analysis as an element of the course, and attempted to unionize college employees. This was not well received by the Dean. In 1937, Reynolds offered her resignation to Everett Kimball, director of the School for Social Work, due to their disagreement over the direction of the program, her political activities, and the termination of Plan D. Reynolds left Smith in 1938, after teaching the last group in the Plan D program.

Between 1939 and 1942, Reynolds was self-employed as a consultant in staff development for social work agencies.

Reynolds published her major work for social work educators, Learning and Teaching in the Practice of Social Work, describing the contributions of psychology and the social sciences to the problems of practice and teaching in social work in 1942.

Between 1943 and 1947, Reynolds was appointed by the United Seamen's Service to the Personal Service Department of the National Maritime Union, where she became case supervisor. She drew on this experience to write Social Work and Social Living, which was published in 1951.

In 1948, Reynolds retired to the family home in Stoughton, where she studied Marxist works, corresponded with friends and former students, had a small clinical practice, and worked as a volunteer on community projects, for the Methodist Church, and the Stoughton Historical Society.

== In media ==
A docudrama based on her letters, performed by Margaret Draper was written and produced at Smith College for the Bertha Capen Reynolds Centennial Conference in June 1985. At that conference, an organizing meeting of progressive social workers was convened, resulting in the founding of the Bertha Capen Reynolds Society in Chicago in October, 1985. The name of the BCRS was later changed to the Social Welfare Action Alliance.

== Death ==
Bertha C. Reynolds died at home in Stoughton on October 29, 1978.

She is buried with her parents and siblings at the Avon Cemetery in Avon, Massachusetts (formerly the town of East Stoughton).

== Legacy ==
A later biographer described her three guiding philosophies as Marxism, Christianity and Freudian/psychodynamic theories. This was not well received by many American social workers and for decades her writings were sidelined in favor of more psychoanalytic approaches.

== Honors ==
Reynolds was honored by Boston University; the Adelphi, Columbia, Fordham, Hunter, New York University, and Yeshiva schools of social work; the New York City chapter of the National Association of Social Workers; and the alumni of the Smith College School for Social Work. She was also honored by the town of Stoughton for participation in community affairs.

== Works ==
- — (1932). An Experiment in Short-contact Interviewing.
- — (1942). Learning and Teaching in the Practice of Social Work. Farrar & Rinehart.
- — (1943). Re-thinking Social Case Work.
- — (1951). Social Work and Social Living: Explorations in Philosophy and Practice.
- — (1963). An Uncharted Journey: Fifty Years of Growth in Social Work.
- — (1973). Between Client and Community: A Study in Responsibility in Social Case Work.
