= Barbara Clark Elam =

African American community activist, advocate, and librarian

- Born: February 10, 1929
- Died: May 7, 2017 (aged 88)

Barbara Aileen Clark Elam was born in the Roxbury neighborhood of Boston, MA. She earned her master's degree from Simmons College in 1949 and became a member of the Delta Sigma Theta Sorority, Omega Chapter.

== Career ==
Elam worked in literacy and education as a librarian at the New York Public Library, the Boston Public Library and as a member of the Massachusetts Black Librarians Association. She was Librarian-in-charge of the Boston Public Schools Library Program in Dorchester. She was elected as a voting library delegate from Massachusetts to the White House Conference on Library and Information Science.

As a member of Freedom House, she promoted educational equity and economic opportunities for Black, Brown, and immigrant youth across Boston. An advocate for mental health, she served as president of the Massachusetts Mental Health Association, advocating for the establishment of the Dr. Solomon Carter Fuller Center.

Elam was also involved in the Boston Women's Heritage Trail, which celebrated the contributions of women throughout history.

In 2023, she was recognized as one of "Boston’s most admired, beloved, and successful Black Women leaders" by the Black Women Lead project.

== Personal life ==
Barbara was an active member of St. Mark Congregational Church in Boston. She met her husband, Judge Harry J. Elam Sr., at the church in 1950. She has a daughter.
