= Dana Chandler =

American visual artist and activist (1941–2025)

- Born: Dana C. Chandler, Jr. April 7, 1941 (age 85); Lynn, Massachusetts U.S.
- Died: June 10, 2025; Gallup, New Mexico
- Other name: Akin Duro
- Occupations: Artist; Professor
- Years active: 1970-present

Dana C. Chandler, Jr., also known as Akin Duro, (April 7, 1941 – June 10, 2025), was a Black Power artist, activist and Professor Emeritus at Simmons University.

== Early life and education ==
Chandler was born in Lynn, Massachusetts. He grew up in the Roxbury neighborhood of Boston.

Chandler was educated in Boston Public Schools. From an early age he began fighting for social justice using art as a tool for change. He was awarded the National Scholastic Art Award for all four years of his high school career, at Boston's Technical High School as well as the school's first annual Art Award in 1959. It was at this time that he joined the NAACP in the black integrationist movement. Chandler was influential on many artists including Gary Rickson.

In 1967, Chandler received a B.S. in Teacher Education from the Massachusetts College of Art.

== Career ==
Chandler was a part of the black integrationist movement in Boston, using art for social justice and human rights.

In 1971, Chandler was hired as an assistant professor at Simmons University. He retired in May 2004.
