= Doris L. Thompson =

American politician

Member of the New Hampshire House of Representatives
- In office 1961–1970

Member of the New Hampshire House of Representatives from the Merrimack 13th district
- In office 1970–1972

Member of the New Hampshire House of Representatives from the Merrimack 10th district
- In office 1972–1978

Personal details
- Born: Doris Mary Long; July 15, 1905 Lowell, Massachusetts, U.S.
- Died: May 18, 1989 (aged 83) Tilton, New Hampshire, U.S.
- Party: Republican
- Children: 2; including Robert M. Lawton
- Relatives: David M. Lawton (grandson)
- Education: Simmons College

Doris Mary Long (July 15, 1905 – May 18, 1989) was an American politician. A member of the Republican Party, she served in the New Hampshire House of Representatives from 1961 to 1978.

== Life and career ==
Thompson was born in Lowell, Massachusetts, the daughter of Dennis Long and Mary Alice Gorman. She attended and graduated from St. Elizabeth Preparatory School. After graduating, she attended Simmons College, graduating in 1927.

Thompson served in the New Hampshire House of Representatives from 1961 to 1978.

== Death ==
Thompson died on May 18, 1989, at her home in Tilton, New Hampshire, at the age of 83.
