= Senator Knight (disambiguation) =

Nehemiah R. Knight (1780–1854) was a U.S. Senator from Rhode Island from 1821 to 1841. Senator Knight may also refer to:

- Benjamin Knight (politician) (1836–1905), California State Senate
- George A. Knight (1892–1963), Nebraska State Senate
- Horatio G. Knight (1818–1895), Massachusetts State Senate
- John Knight (judge) (1871–1955), New York State Senate
- John E. Knight (1925–1999), Nebraska State Senate
- Steve Knight (politician) (born 1966), California State Senate
- William J. Knight (1929–2004), California State Senate
- William M. Knight (1837–1910), Maryland State Senate

== See also ==
- Senator McKnight (disambiguation)
