= Dennis Saleebey =

American academic (1936–2014)

- Born: Michael Dennis Saleebey; August 29, 1936
- Died: July 16, 2014 (aged 77)
- Occupation: Academic
- Partner: Ann Weick

Michael Dennis Saleebey (August 29, 1936 – July 16, 2014) was an American academic credited with codifying and promoting the social work practice of strength-based practice during his time at the University of Kansas. He was an Emeritus Professor of Social Welfare there at the School of Social Welfare.

== Personal life ==
He was the partner of Ann Weick, who also developed the strength-based theory at the University of Kansas.

== Books ==
Saleebey's books include:

- Transcultural Perspectives in the Human Services: Organizational Issues and Trends (Springfield: Charles C. Thomas, 1983, with Roosevelt Wright Jr., Thomas D. Watts, and Pedro J. Lecca)
- The Strengths Perspective in Social Work Practice (New York: Longman, 1992, edited; 6th ed., 2013)
- Human Behavior and Social Environments: A Biopsychosocial Approach (Columbia University Press 2001)
