= Kenneth Leslie =

Canadian poet and songwriter (1892–1974)

- Born: October 31, 1892; Pictou, Nova Scotia, Canada
- Died: October 7, 1974 (aged 81); Halifax, Nova Scotia, Canada
- Education: Dalhousie University; University of Nebraska
- Occupations: Poet; songwriter; editor; activist
- Spouses: Elizabeth Moir (div. bef. 1934); Marjorie Finlay Hewitt (m. 1934; div.); Katherine Rose Kastorea (Kathy) (div.); Nora Steenerson Totten (m. 1960)
- Writing career
- Notable works: By Stubborn Stars and Other Poems (1938)
- Notable awards: Governor General's Award (1938)
- Literary movement: The Song Fishermen

Kenneth Leslie (1892–1974) was a Canadian poet and songwriter, and an influential political activist in the United States during the 1930s and 1940s. He was the founder and editor of The Protestant Digest (later The Protestant), which had a peak circulation of over 50,000 subscribers. A Christian socialist, he was given the nickname, "God's Red Poet".

== Life ==
Leslie was born in Pictou, Nova Scotia, on October 31, 1892. His father, Robert Jamieson Leslie, was a shipping magnate and in 1905 became a member of the Quebec legislature, but drowned that year when one of his ships, The Lunenberg, sank in a storm off the Magdalen Islands (which were part of his Quebec constituency).

Kenneth Leslie was raised by his mother, Bertha Starratt Leslie. As a boy he learned to play the violin and piano, and loved to sing; he also wrote poetry. He "was a child prodigy, attending Dalhousie University in Halifax at age 14." Later he was educated at Colgate Theological Seminary for a year; the University of Nebraska, where he received his Master of Arts degree in 1914; and Harvard, where he studied under the American idealist philosopher Josiah Royce, but did not receive a doctorate.

=== First marriage ===
Leslie was married four times. His first wife, Elizabeth, was the daughter of the wealthy Halifax candy manufacturer, James Moir. The couple led an active social life, travelling widely, acquainted with some of the leading literary and artistic figures of the day. In Halifax they were members of The Song Fishermen, a social and literary set led by their friends, Andrew and Tully Merkel, whose Halifax, Nova Scotia, home was "a favourite rendezvous for writers and artists." Leslie became a close friend of Song Fisherman Robert Norwood, "a native of New Ross, N.S. who published eight books of poetry and became, as rector of St. Bartholomew’s Church in New York, one of the most renowned preachers in North America."

In approximately 1928, the Leslies and their children spent a year in Paris. This year was predominantly spent travelling continental Europe, even though the trip was meant to facilitate Leslie's studies at the Sorbonne. In the late 1920s, the Leslies relocated to New York City, where Leslie began losing his wife's money playing the stock market: "Estimates of the loss run from $25,000 to $250,000." During those years, the Leslies were active in theatre circles. Leslie studied acting, and his children were cast in a Broadway play. Leslie wrote his own "'Broadway' musical, which collapsed in rehearsals, and a few dozen other songs which did not sell in Tin Pan Alley."

During the 1930s, Leslie hosted a radio program on Newark, New Jersey, station WOR on which he read poetry, sang Gaelic songs, and played the violin.

In the 1930s, the Leslies' marriage fell apart. As Kenneth Leslie later told it: "My wife had the habit of taking all the children away to stay with relatives for months at a time, leaving me alone. I stepped out on her and she divorced me." Beth prevented him from seeing his children again in her lifetime, and even changed the name of his son (from Kenneth Alexander to Alexander Moir). After her death Leslie reconciled with his daughters; but he never saw his son again.

=== Second marriage ===
In 1934, Leslie married Marjorie Finlay Hewitt, a divorcée, who had "become enamoured of him when she attended a poetry reading he was giving in Montclair, N.J." The dozen years of their marriage were the most productive of his life. In 1934, he published Windward Rock, "the first of several acclaimed volumes of poetry in 1934." Three more books of poetry Lowlands Low, Such a Din and By Stubborn Stars would follow in the next four years.

The last volume, By Stubborn Stars, won Canada's Governor General's Award in 1938. But by then Leslie had other concerns. During the mid-1930s, "he had become increasingly disturbed by the growth of fascist and anti-semitic attitudes in the United States throughout the 'thirties and the concomitant influence of isolationist sentiments on American foreign policy." In particular he was concerned about the radio broadcasts of the Roman Catholic priest Charles Coughlin, who was reaching as many as 40 million listeners. He worried about the spread of groups like the German-American Bund, the Protestant War Veterans Association, the Christian Mobilizers, the Christian Front, and William Dudley Pelley's Silver Shirts, all of whom he saw as being inspired by Coughlin's anti-semitism.

So "during the late 1930s, he chose to take a public stand, launching the Protestant Digest (later The Protestant), a progressive journal of religion and politics." In December 1938, with the "support of his second wife, who provided almost all of the initial investment money (approximately $40,000), he created the Protestant Digest, ... which eventually attained a circulation of 50,000 and became a powerful voice in the war against fascism and anti-semitism in the United States." "With contributions from the leading public intellectuals of the day, the magazine called for a declaration of war against the Axis powers, and stood firmly against the oppression of Jews."

The theologians Paul Tillich and Reinhold Niebuhr became editorial advisers to The Protestant, "as did ... Dr. John Mackay, President of Princeton Theological Seminary, James Luther Adams of the Meadville Theological Seminary in Chicago, and Louie D. Newton of Atlanta, Associate Secretary of the Baptist World Alliance. "But [Leslie's] leftist politics and pointed criticism of the Catholic Church (which in his view had enabled Europe’s fascists) earned him enemies as well."

"By the early 1940s, Leslie's organization [Protestant Associates] had produced numerous offshoots, including a national organization of anti-fascist Protestant clergy.... Leslie himself was in constant demand as a speaker, and earned endorsements from the likes of Eleanor Roosevelt," the First Lady.

One initiative of Protestant Associates was "the Textbook Commission, with Leslie as 'national' chairman. ... The Commission gave itself the mandate of searching out and eliminating anti-semitic statements in American textbooks." In December 1943, the Commission released a list of 33 books carrying what it called "race-hating propaganda." "The fact that a large number of these publications were in use in Roman Catholic parochial schools contributed to Leslie’s undeserved (but growing) reputation as a virulent anti-Catholic."

Leslie also came up with the idea of The Challenger, "an anti-fascist comic book which appeared sporadically in 1944 and once in 1945, this last time in a 64 page "deluxe" edition which had a press run of 400,000 and sold at 10 cents. The cover of the 1945 edition shows youths of the white, yellow and black races battling green demons of fear, hate and greed. Gerald Richardson, the editor, made use of nationally known cartoonists in this attempt to counter the mass production of fascist propaganda aimed at the young."

In 1945, fascism had decreased in comparison to the start of World War II and so was 'fascist propaganda'. During this time period, fascism as a Western threat decreased, however, communism in the western world was a developing threat. Leslie was a part of the anti-fascist coalition. Leslie criticized the Catholic Church as enablers of fascism and was later criticized by its supporters as an enabler of Communism. After he called the Church anti-semitic, he was called anti-Catholic. Typical of the attacks on him was a "widely-distributed Roman Catholic newspaper in 1947 [that] described The Protestant as the 'Red Hope' and accused Leslie of serving faithfully 'the Moscow purpose to wipe out the Catholic Church, as the chief moral obstacle in the path to Soviet World domination."

At the same time, by Leslie's account, he was fighting to maintain control over editorial policy against executive staff of The Protestant who were supporters of the Communist Party. As a result of that struggle, six members of the executive resigned in November 1946, "allegedly because of Leslie's dictatorial, one-man control of the publication."

After this, Leslie's financial support and "his personal prestige, became severely diminished." To make matters worse, his wife discovered he was "having an affair with his private secretary, Kathy, a Polish-American girl some thirty years younger than himself," and filed for divorce. Since Leslie had never taken a proper salary from The Protestant, this left him with no personal income.

Following this, Leslie was scrutinised by the FBI as well as Senator Joseph McCarthy's anti-communist crusade. In addition, he was listed as one of the top 50 communist "fellow travelers and innocent dupes" on the Life Magazine alongside figures including Albert Einstein, Norman Mailer, Leonard Bernstein, Arthur Miller and Langston Hughes."

In 1949, Leslie returned to Nova Scotia permanently.

=== Third and fourth marriages ===
Kenneth Leslie arrived back in Canada with a new wife, "Kathy, whose parents were peasant class Polish immigrants [and] had no independent source of income. Leslie had to find a job." He drove a taxi and found some work as a substitute teacher. He tried to enter academe: "financially down-and-out and reduced to driving a taxi to earn a living, he entered the education faculty of Dalhousie University, only to withdraw after a few weeks, thoroughly disillusioned with the feeble intellectual quality of the program."

His new marriage fell apart quickly. "Kathy was not happy in Nova Scotia — and she had fallen in love with one of Leslie's nephews, a man close to her own age. Tearfully, and still with great fondness for her husband, she left him to join the nephew."

Kenneth Leslie lived quietly in rural Nova Scotia, working as a lay preacher and substitute teacher. Due to his activist past, plus a 1958 trip he made to the Soviet Union, he was for some time under Royal Canadian Mounted Police surveillance, and an object of "parental anxieties about Communists in the classroom".

The Protestant finally shut down in 1953. But for the next 20 years Leslie continued to publish successor periodicals: One, New Christian, Man, and New Man.

In 1960, Leslie heard of the death of an old friend, Judge Totten. He "drove alone to California to console — and to marry — the judge's widow, Nora Steenerson Totten. The couple were devoted to each other and collaborated on the publication of New Man until 1972, when ill-health forced them both to enter a Halifax nursing home...Only about a dozen friends and relatives attended the funeral. Nora died the following spring."

== Death ==
Kenneth Leslie died on October 7, 1974, at a rest home in Halifax, Nova Scotia.

== Poetry ==
Leslie wrote poetry as a boy; his first poem, he later recalled, was about Bonnie Prince Charlie. In the 1920s in Nova Scotia he and his first wife were members of The Song Fishermen, a literary and society group that included Charles G. D. Roberts and Bliss Carman. Leslie began contributing poetry to the Song Fishermen broadsheets, and soon in other small Halifax literary publications too. By the end of the decade he had published poems in Literary Digest and Scribner's.

His first collection, Windward I Rock, "was published by Macmillan in New York in 1934 and received favourable critical attention on both sides of the Atlantic. The Times Literary Supplement praised him for having 'broken through the crust of the conventional to something that is burningly alive.'"

His next two books, Lowlands Low (1935) and Such a Din! (1936), were published in Halifax and received little critical notice. "But in 1938 he won considerable acclaim and the Governor-General’s award with the publication in Toronto of By Stubborn Stars and Other Poems. Roberts, by then the grand old man of Canadian letters, ranked Leslie at this time a better poet than E.J. Pratt, and Pratt himself wrote to Leslie.... 'I gave an address the other day on the newer poets and quoted at length from your book.'"

After 1938 Leslie published very little outside his own periodicals. But he continued to write poetry and publish poetry through the 1950s, 1960s, and 1970s. "Some of his best poems of these years are highly political: 'Moscow's Measure,' 'Remember Lumumba!' and 'Praise the Viet Cong.' They are as stirring and passionately rhetorical as anything he ever wrote."

Ladysmith Press published The Collected Poems of Kenneth Leslie in 1971. However, because editor Sean Haldane omitted a number of poems 'because they were light verse, or political verse, which fulfilled a temporal need,' Leslie published his own collected edition, O'Malley to the Reds and Other Poems, in 1972.

Jennifer Fandel wrote in ForeWord Review:

The true beauty of Leslie's poetry lies in his often stunning use of language. His seemingly simple word choices, combined with his attention to meter and form, may remind readers of the early work of W.B. Yeats. Additionally, he draws readers in with sound (waiting for the snow, / the foam of bloom forgotten), at times reminiscent of Gerard Manley Hopkins. But the daring of Leslie's work stems from his desire to reveal the complex dualities with which he wrestled in his personal life. From the double entendre in the crotched necessity of standing true / to her while pledging life and love to you to the moody repetition of this monster ledge / of granite under granite clouds, Leslie's language lingers in the mind and on the tongue.

== Recognition ==
Leslie won the 1938 Governor General's Award for his book, By Stubborn Stars.

The lyrics to Leslie's song "Cape Breton Lullaby" (set to a different, traditional melody) have been recorded by several Canadian Celtic artists, including Catherine McKinnon, Ryan's Fancy, and The Cottars.

Leslie was the subject of a 2008 VisionTV documentary, God’s Red Poet: The Life of Kenneth Leslie.

== Publications ==
=== Poetry and songs ===
- Windward Rock: Poems. New York: Macmillan, 1934.
- Lowlands Low: Poems. Halifax: McCurdy, 1935.
- Such a Din! Poems. Halifax: McCurdy, 1936.
- By Stubborn Stars and Other Poems. Toronto: Ryerson, 1938.
- Songs of Nova Scotia. [Words and music by Kenneth Leslie.] Halifax, 1964.
- The Poems of Kenneth Leslie [Ed. Sean Haldane.] Ladysmith, Quebec: Ladysmith Press, 1971.
- O'Malley to the Reds And Other Poems. Halifax: By the Author, 1972.
- The Essential Kenneth Leslie. [Ed. Zachariah Wells] Erin, Ontario: Porcupine's Quill, 2010. ISBN 0-88984-328-7, ISBN 978-0-88984-328-8

=== Anthologized poems ===
- "Cobweb College." "A warm rain whispers, but the earth knows best." "Day slipped out of the web of her fog-wet gown." "My love is sleeping; but her body seems." "The silver herring throbbed thick in my seine." The Book of Canadian Poetry. Ed. A. J. M. Smith. First Edition. Chicago: University of Chicago Press, 1943, p. 300. (Also in the 1948 and 1957 editions of the anthology.)
- "A warm rain whispers, but the earth knows best." "The silver herring throbbed thick in my seine." Twentieth-Century Canadian Poetry. Ed. Earle Birney. Toronto: Ryerson, 1953, pp. 14–15.
- "From soil somehow the poet's word." "My love is sleeping; but her body seems." "The silver herring throbbed thick in my seine." The Oxford Book of Canadian Verse. Ed. A. J. M. Smith. Toronto: Oxford University Press, 1960, pp. 173–174.
- "A warm rain whispers, but the earth knows best." "The silver herring throbbed thick in my seine." The Penguin Book of Canadian Verse. Ed. Ralph Gustafson. Revised Edition. Harmondsworth: Penguin Books, 1967, p. 126. (Also in later editions.)
- "Halibut Cove Harvest," "The silver herring throbbed thick in my seine," The New Oxford Book of Canadian Verse in English. Ed. Margaret Atwood. Toronto: Oxford University Press, 1983. ISBN 0-19-540450-5
- "The silver herring throbbed thick in my seine." Jailbreaks: 99 Canadian Sonnets. Ed. Zachariah Wells. Windsor: Biblioasis, 2008, p. 35.

=== Pamphlets and periodicals ===
- Protestant Digest. Boston and New York, 1938-41.
- The Protestant. New York and Halifax, 1941-53.
- Hungary: Christian or Pagan: An Eye-Witness Report. [New York: New Christian Books, c.1950].
- One. Halifax: New Christian Books, 1951?
- New Christian. Halifax, 1953-55.
- New Christian Pamphlet. Halifax, 1955 [-?]
- Man. Halifax, [1957-59?]
- New Man. Pictou and Halifax, 1959-72.
- Christ, Church And Communism. Gravenhurst, Ontario: Northern Book House, 1962.

Except where noted, bibliographical information courtesy of Canadian Poetry: Studies/Documents/Reviews.
