= John Simmons (clothing manufacturer) =

American businessman (1796–1870)

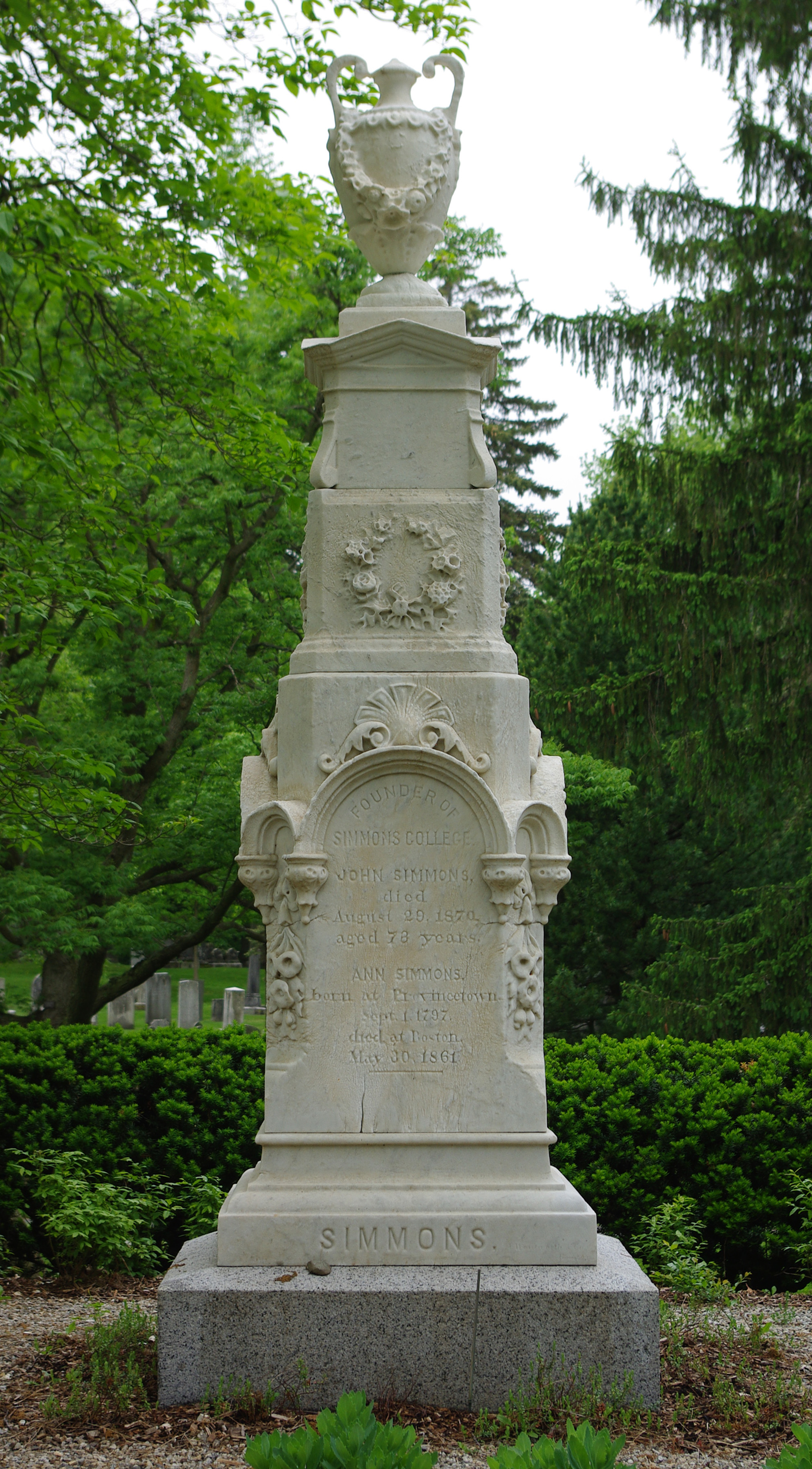
Marker of John Simmons, Mount Auburn Cemetery

John Simmons (October 30, 1796 – August 29, 1870) was a pioneer in clothing manufacturing and the founder of Simmons College, a liberal arts women's college (and co-ed graduate school) in Boston, Massachusetts.

He was born in Little Compton, Rhode Island and grew up on a family farm. Simmons was a direct descendant of early Plymouth colonist, Moses Simonson. As a teenager, John Simmons traveled to Boston to join his elder brother, who had become a tailor. Working as a tailor, John Simmons noticed that many customers required clothing in similar sizes, and he struck upon the idea of making up clothes in common sizes in advance. He was thus an innovator in making ready-to-wear clothing in standard sizes.

By the end of the American Civil War, he had become the country’s largest clothing manufacturer. With the profits from his clothing business, he became a real estate investor and eventually owned much of the Financial District in Boston.

When Simmons died in 1870, his will provided for his estate to "found and endow an institution to be called Simmons Female College, for the purpose of teaching medicine, music, drawing, designing, telegraphy, and other branches of art, science, and industry best calculated to enable the scholars to acquire an independent livelihood."

The founding of this institution was delayed by the Great Boston Fire of 1872, which destroyed most of his properties. The rebuilding took many years, and it was only in 1899 that the institution was finally established. Today it is known as Simmons University.
