= Swiss Sonata =

1938 novel by Gwethalyn Graham

- Author: Gwethalyn Graham
- Language: English
- Publisher: Charles Scribner's & Sons
- Publication date: 1938
- Publication place: Canada
- Pages: 219

Swiss Sonata is a 1938 novel by Gwethalyn Graham. The book won the Canadian 1938 Governor General's Award for fiction. The novel focuses on the lives of the young women in a Switzerland boarding school set against the backdrop of the dark clouds of war gathering over all of Europe at the time. The author used her own experiences at a school in Lausanne as inspiration for the novel.

== Synopsis ==
The story is set in Switzerland in 1935 in a girl's boarding school over a three day period. The story revolves around the lives of the girls who come from various countries in Europe and North America. Their hope, dreams, anxieties and prejudices are on display all the while rising tensions in Europe simmer around them.

Several subplots are described throughout the book. Vicky Morrison, a girl from Toronto, Canada, figures prominently in a story about a package of cigarettes. Teddy, a girl from St. Louis, Missouri, comments acerbically about boys. "God, how boring most men are. . . . You say at a dance, 'Let's go outside,' because you're steaming with heat and want to cool off . . . and they think you want to be kissed. The suspicion that they're not attractive to you never occurs to the little dears."

== Reception ==
The book won the Governor General's Award for fiction in 1938. A review that year by W. A. Deacon wrote that the novel was organizationally brilliant with easy dialogue made by a young female author of extraordinary maturity. Some of the political situations at the time were mentioned in passing within the novel. The Saar plebiscite which is mentioned caused the book to be banned by the German Nazi government.

However, a 2005 review by Karin Marley argues that the book has not aged well. According to Marley, despite foreseeing future atrocities, it is unlikely that the book would make contemporary Governor General's Award shortlists. She says, "It's a book that's meant to edify, but the lessons are too obviously laid out. Like the headmistress she parodies, Graham is more at ease writing theory than personality, despite her professed love for individualism."
