= Simmons University =

Private women's university in Boston, Massachusetts, US

- Former name: Simmons College (1899–2018)
- Type: Private university
- Established: 1899; 127 years ago
- Accreditation: NECHE
- Affiliations: Colleges of the Fenway
- Endowment: $253.6 million (2025)
- President: Lynn Perry Wooten
- Faculty: 186 full-time
- Students: 5,348 (fall 2025)
- Undergraduates: 1,675 (fall 2025)
- Postgraduates: 3,673 (fall 2025)
- Location: Boston, Massachusetts, United States; 42.339800°N 71.100200°W
- Campus: 12 acres (4.9 ha); Urban
- Nickname: Sharks
- Website: www.simmons.edu
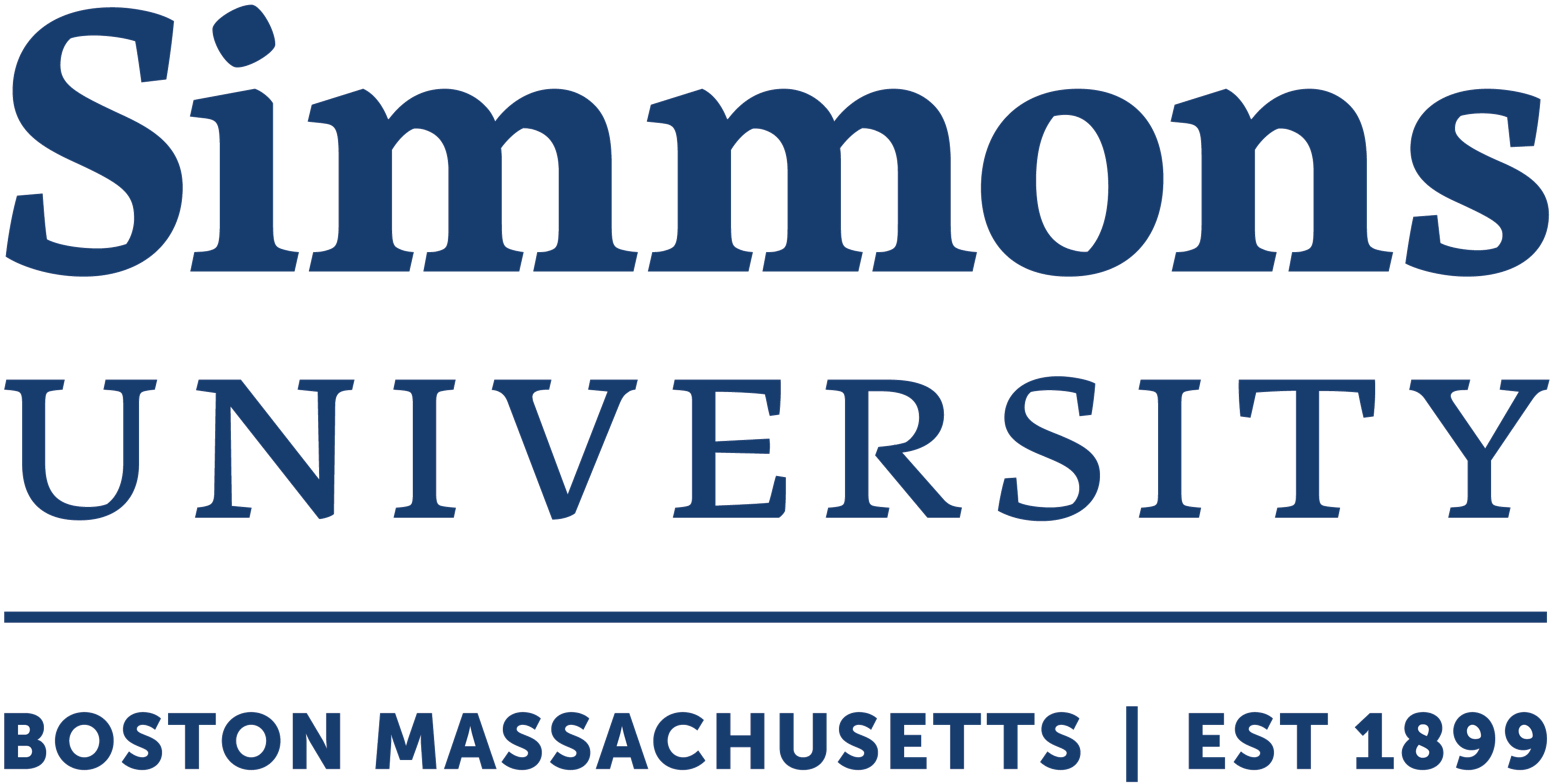

Simmons University is a private university in Boston, Massachusetts, United States. Established in 1899 by clothing manufacturer John Simmons as Simmons College, in 2018 it reorganized its structure and adopted its current name. Its undergraduate program is women-focused while its graduate programs are co-educational.

Simmons is accredited by the New England Commission of Higher Education. In 2020, it accepted 83 percent of applicants for undergraduate admission. The university is divided into two campuses in the Fenway-Kenmore neighborhood totaling 12 acres (4.9 ha), one of which has five academic buildings and the other of which has nine Georgian-style residential buildings.

As of fall 2025, the university enrolled 1,675 undergraduates and 3,673 graduate students. Its athletics teams compete in NCAA Division III as the Sharks.

== History ==
Simmons was founded in 1899 with a bequest by John Simmons, a wealthy clothing manufacturer in Boston. Simmons founded the college, called Simmons College, based on the belief that women ought to live independently by offering a liberal arts education for undergraduate women to integrate into professional work experience. Sarah Louise Arnold was the school's first dean.

Simmons is a member of the Colleges of the Fenway consortium, which also includes Emmanuel College, Wentworth Institute of Technology, Massachusetts College of Pharmacy and Health Sciences, and Massachusetts College of Art and Design. Simmons absorbed Garland Junior College in 1976. (Wheelock College, a former member, merged with Boston University to become the Boston University Wheelock College of Education & Human Development.)

Simmons graduated its first African American student in 1914. Furthermore, Simmons was one of the few private colleges not to impose admission quotas on Jewish students for the first half of the 1900s.

The school's MBA program was the first in the world designed specifically for women. Today, the undergraduate program is women-centered, while the graduate schools are coed.

In 2014, Simmons College teamed up with for-profit online program manager 2U, a deal that would generate hundreds of millions of dollars in revenue for the school.

In November 2014, the institution released an explicit policy on the acceptance of transgender students, claiming a strong tradition of empowering women and challenging traditional gender roles and a "rich history of inclusion." Its undergraduate program accepts applicants who are assigned female at birth as well as those who self-identify as women, making Simmons the third women-centered college in the United States to accept transgender women. Government documentation of gender is not required. (Graduate programs are co-educational, so gender identity is not of concern.)

In 2016, the MBA program went online as MBA@Simmons, and began admitting men.

In 2018, Simmons College changed its name to Simmons University after reorganizing the structure of the school.

== Campus ==
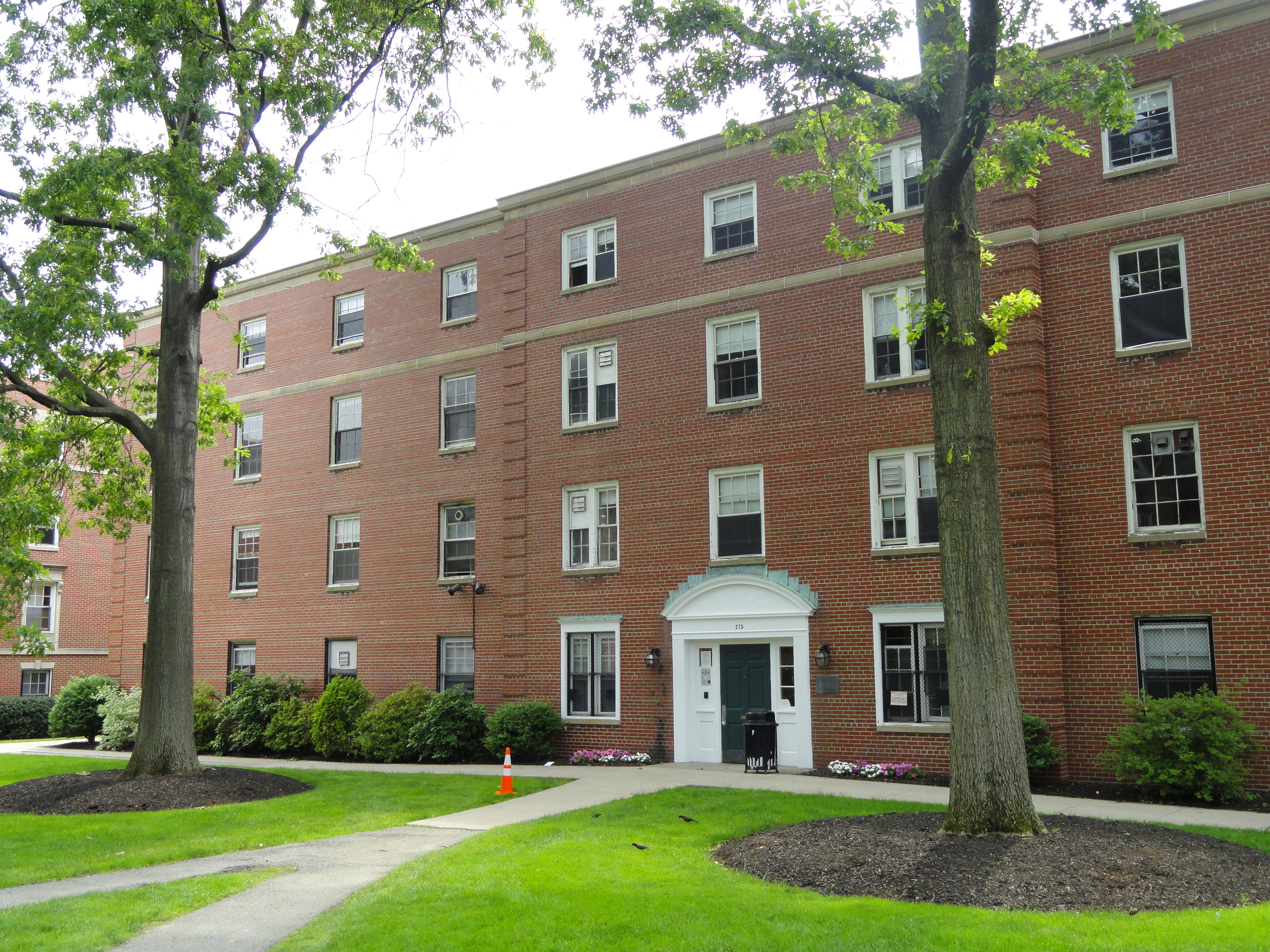
Morse Hall, located on the residential campus

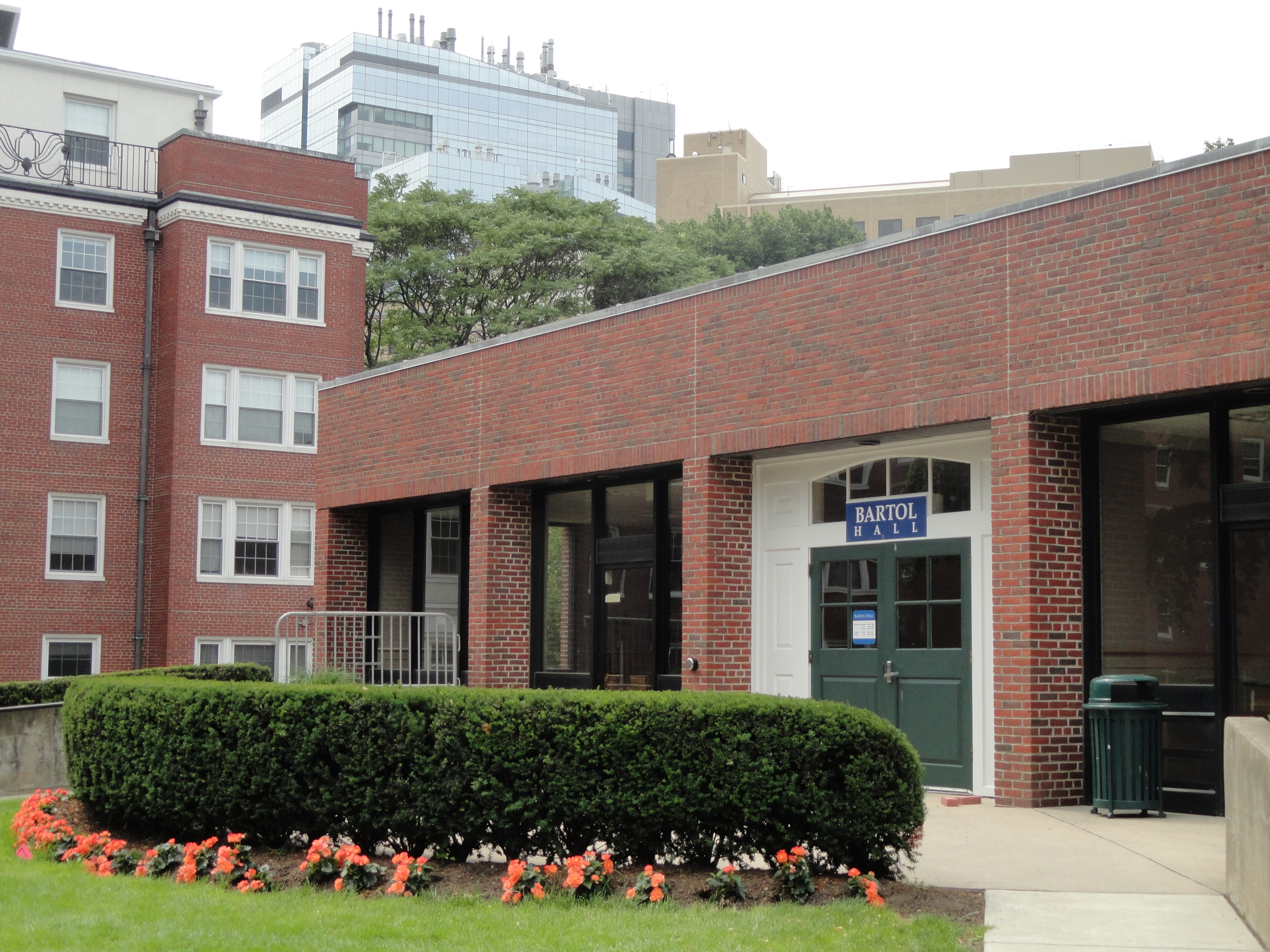
Bartol Hall, one of the dining halls at Simmons

Simmons University is currently divided into two campuses located in the Fenway-Kenmore neighborhood of Boston, Massachusetts. One campus is home to five academic buildings referred to as the Academic Campus. The other campus, referred to as the Residential Campus, is home to nine residential buildings for undergraduate students. The original site of the Simmons College Graduate School of Social Work is featured on the Boston Women's Heritage Trail.

In November 2020, a plan for a single campus was launched by the university called One Simmons. This plan aims to combine the two campuses into a single campus and create a 21-story "Living and Learning Center." This will include 1,100 dorm rooms, classrooms, and athletic facilities. Additionally, the plan outlines renovations to the Main College Building and Lefavour Hall. Lefavour Hall specifically will be outfitted with a new library and a new science center. Following the completion of these renovations in spring of 2022, the Park Science Center has been closed. It is going to be taken down to build the new Living and Learning Center. The project is scheduled to break ground in Fall 2022 and open in Fall 2026.

Simmons University entered into an agreement with Skanska, a multinational construction and property development company. Skanska will build the new Living and Learning Center building, and in exchange, Simmons University will give Skanska a 99-year lease for the grounds of the residential campus. Skanska will plan and execute commercial development of the former residential campus after the construction of the Living and Learning Center is completed.

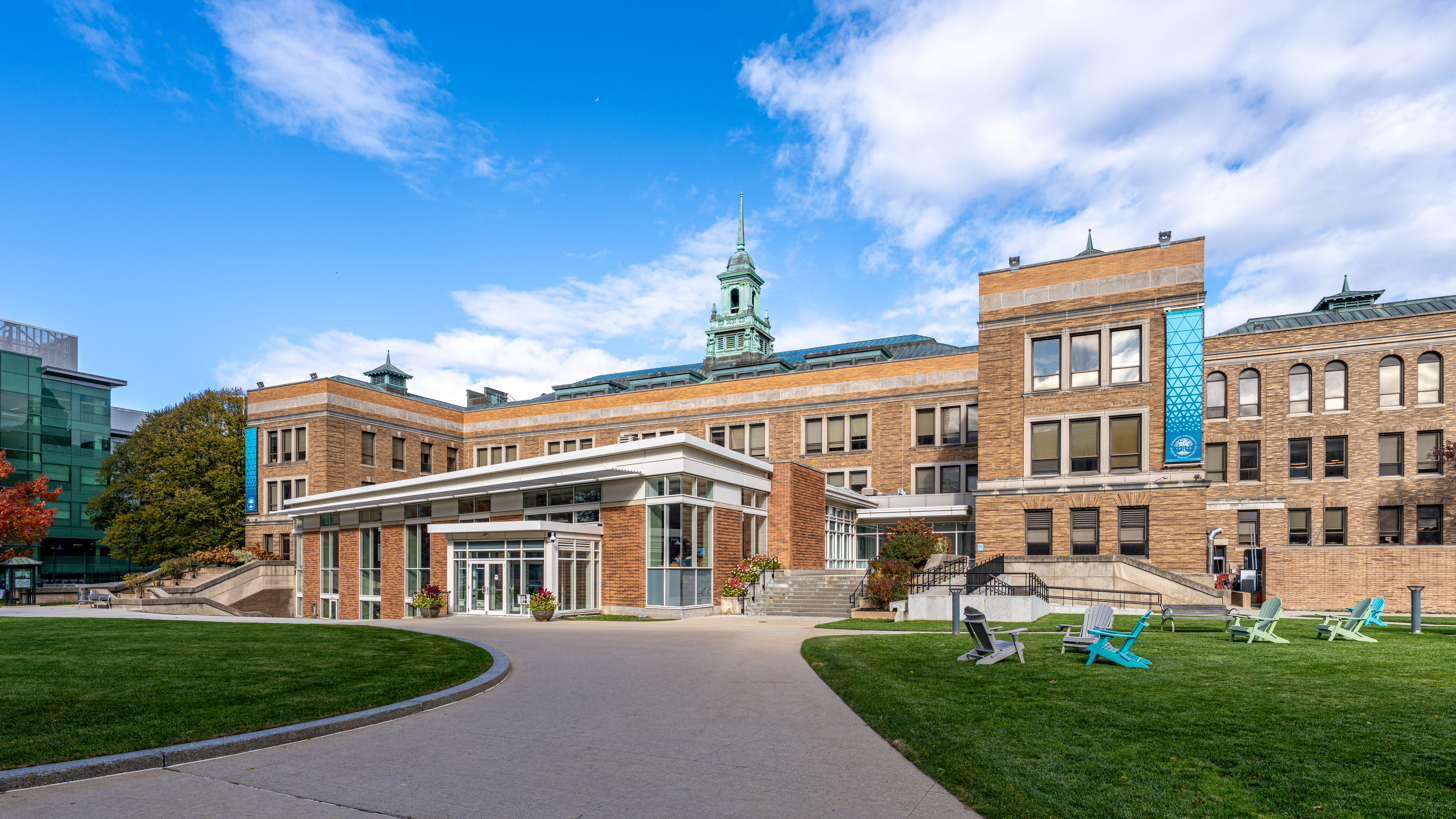
Simmons College Main College Building (2025)

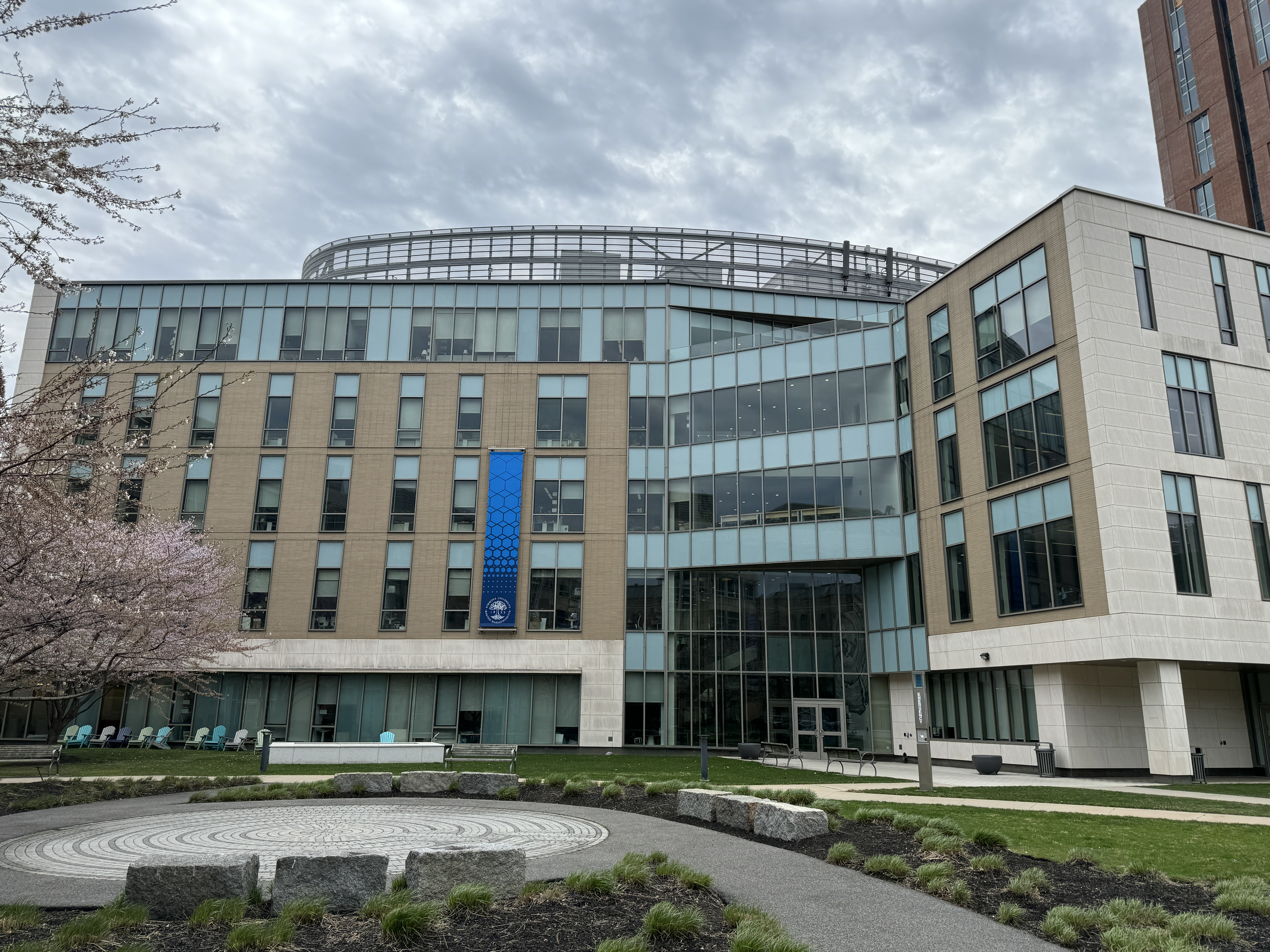
Simmons University Helen G. Drinan Hall (2026)

=== Academic Campus ===
The Academic Campus is located at 300 The Fenway in the Longwood Medical Area. It is immediately adjacent to the Isabella Stewart Gardner Museum and the Boston Latin School. This campus currently consists of five buildings:

- One Palace Road (the 2nd through 4th floors are leased to Massachusetts College of Pharmacy and Health Sciences)
- Main College Building
- Beatley Library/Lefavour Hall (renovated in 2023 to also house the science facilities)
- Helen G. Drinan Hall (formerly the School of Management and Academic Building) (a 2017 green construction)

== Student body ==
According to the College Scorecard, the racial and ethnic composition of the undergraduate population is 62% white, 11% Asian, 8% Hispanic, 6% black, and 5% non-resident alien. Thirty percent of the undergraduate student body is Pell Grant eligible.

=== Admissions ===
Simmons received 2,905 first-year applications for admission in fall 2020. They admitted 2,398 applicants (82.5% acceptance rate) and enrolled 451. The average high school GPA of first-year students enrolled in fall 2020 was 3.69; the middle 50% range of SAT composite scores was 1080–1250; and the middle 50% range of ACT composite scores was 24–29.

=== Sustainability ===
Former President Susan Scrimshaw signed the American College & University Presidents' Climate Commitment (ACUPCC) as a formal commitment to eliminate campus greenhouse gas emissions over time. Furthermore, the School of Management is addressing sustainability in its curriculum as well as in building and resource-management programs.

== Academics ==
Simmons University is accredited by the New England Commission of Higher Education. Its most popular undergraduate majors, by number out of 412 graduates in 2022, were:

- Registered Nursing/Registered Nurse (117)
- Family Practice Nurse/Nursing (47)
- Biopsychology (25)
- Exercise Science and Kinesiology (23)
- Psychology (22)

Simmons University reorganized its academic structure in 2024 to foster interdisciplinary learning and cross-departmental collaboration among its constituent schools:

- Gwen Ifill School of Media, Humanities, and Social Sciences
- School of Library and Information Science (SLIS), est. 1902
- School of Management
- School of Nursing
- School of Sciences and Health Professions
- School of Social Work

== Athletics ==
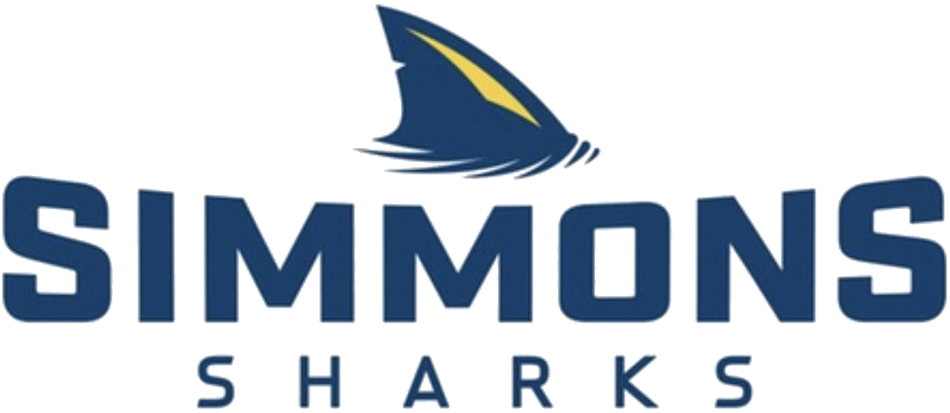
Simmons Sharks wordmark

Simmons University sponsors athletics teams, nicknamed the Sharks, in a variety of sports including crew, cross country, field hockey, lacrosse, soccer, softball, swimming & diving, tennis, and volleyball. The mascot is the Sharks and the colors are blue and yellow. They compete as members of the NCAA Division III in the Great Northeast Athletic Conference (GNAC), the New England Women's and Men's Athletic Conference (NEWMAC) and the Eastern College Athletic Conference (ECAC).

Simmons athletes won some of the early national intercollegiate women's tennis championships in singles (Marjorie Sachs, 1932) and doubles (Dorrance Chase, 1930 and 1932, with Sachs).

== Notable alumnae ==
Simmons alumnae include:

- Emily Banks, class of 1959, actress Shore Leave and model Miss Rheingold
- Susan Porter Benson (1943–2005), historian
- Julie Berry (author), children's author
- Lenore Blum (born 1942), computer scientist and mathematician
- Kristin Cashore, author
- Margaret Curtis (1883–1965), social worker and athlete
- Jahaira DeAlto (died 2021), social worker, lgbt activist, and domestic violence victims' advocate
- Denise Di Novi (born 1956), film producer
- Barbara Clark Elam (1929–2017)
- Rehema Ellis, NBC News correspondent
- Jessica Fay, politician
- Dorothy Celeste Boulding Ferebee (1898–1980), class of 1920, African-American physician and activist
- David S. Ferriero (born 1949) 10th Archivist of the United States
- Nnenna Freelon (born 1954), jazz singer
- Ann M. Fudge, businesswoman, former CEO of Young & Rubicam
- Tipper Gore (born 1947), attended (Garland Junior College), former Second Lady of the United States
- Eolyn Klugh Guy, social worker associated with YWCA
- Christine Heppermann, author and poet
- Theodora Kimball Hubbard, landscape architect, librarian
- Marjorie Hulsizer Copher, dietitian who served in World War I
- Gwen Ifill (1955–2016), class of 1977, journalist, television newscaster and author
- Louise Andrews Kent (1886–1969), author
- Megan Dowd Lambert, children's book author and academic
- Mackenzi Lee, author
- Gail Levin, class of 1969, art historian
- Elinor Lipman (born 1950), novelist
- Gladys Edson Locke (1887-1945), mystery writer and librarian
- Bertha Mahony (1882–1969), founder of The Horn Book Magazine
- Barbara Margolis (1929–2009), prisoners' rights advocate who served as the official greeter of New York City
- Susan K. Martin (1965), librarian
- Hannah M. McCarthy, college administrator and businessperson
- Cheyney McKnight, historical interpreter
- Jeffrey Mello, Episcopal priest (Bishop of Connecticut)
- Eleanor Milleville (1922–1991), sculptor
- Sara Mokuria, activist and teacher
- Catherine N. Norton (1941–2014), librarian
- Sondra Perl, Professor Emerita of English at Lehman College and director of the Ph.D. in Composition and Rhetoric at the Graduate Center of the City University of New York
- Bertha Reynolds, social worker
- Mabel Leilani Smyth, Director of the Public Nursing Service for the Territory of Hawaii
- Ella Josephine Spooner, college professor
- Srinagarindra (1900–1995), Princess Mother of Thailand
- Valerie Thomas, scientist and inventor
- Susan Traverso (1983), president of Thiel College, former provost of Elizabethtown College
- Suzyn Waldman, color commentator for the New York Yankees
- Allyson Schwartz, U.S. Representative Pennsylvania's 13th congressional district 2005–2015
- Doris L. Thompson, New Hampshire representative
- Anne Williams Wheaton, publicist and first White House Associate Press Secretary
- Esther M. Wilkins (1916–2016), pioneer in the field of dental hygiene, teacher, and author of Clinical Practice of the Dental Hygienist
- Mary Elizabeth Wood, 1861–1931, librarian and lay missionary who actively promoted Chinese early education and librarianship
- Alex Wright, writer and information architect
- Nancy Ip, President of the Hong Kong University of Science and Technology
- Aline A. Yamashita, educator and politician
- Jill Zarin (born 1963), reality television personality

== Notable faculty ==
- William M. Bellamy, former U.S. ambassador to Kenya from 2003 to 2006
- Harry C. Bentley, founder and namesake of Bentley College served as professor of accounting
- Nancy Bond, winner of a Newbery Honor, taught at the Simmons College Center for the Study of Children's Literature from 1979 to 2001
- Dana Chandler, artist and activist.
- Quindara Oliver Dodge, dietitian, professor of institution management
- Sophronia Maria Elliott, home economist
- Alicia Craig Faxon, art historian
- Emily Hale, speech and drama teacher, muse of T. S. Eliot
- Megan Dowd Lambert, children's book author and academic
- Gregory Maguire, author, professor and co-director at the Simmons College Center for the Study of Children's Literature from 1979 to 1985
- Isadore Gilbert Mudge, librarian, part-time lecturer
- Mary Schenck Woolman, pioneer in vocational education

=== Presidents ===
- Henry Lefavour (1901–1933)
- Bancroft Beatley (1933–1955)
- William Edgar Park (1955–1970)
- William J. Holmes (1970–1993)
- Jean Dowdall (1993–1995)
- Daniel S. Cheever Jr. (1995–2006)
- Susan C. Scrimshaw (2006–2008)
- Helen Drinan (2008–2020)
- Lynn Perry Wooten (2020–present)

== See also ==
- Simmons College Center for the Study of Children's Literature
