= Susan C. Scrimshaw =

American medical anthropologist

- Born: 1945 (age 80–81); Boston, Massachusetts
- Education: Barnard College; Columbia University
- Known for: Research on cultural factors affecting public health
- Awards: Margaret Mead Award (1985)
- Scientific career
- Fields: Medical anthropology
- Workplaces: Columbia University; University of California, Los Angeles; University of Illinois Chicago; Simmons University; The Sage Colleges
- Academic advisors: Margaret Mead

Susan Crosby Scrimshaw is an American scholar of medical anthropology and university administrator. She served as president of Simmons University, The Sage Colleges, and dean of the School of Public Health at the University of Illinois Chicago.

== Biography ==
Scrimshaw was born in Boston in 1945 and was raised in Guatemala until she was 16. Her father was food scientist Nevin S. Scrimshaw, a professor at Massachusetts Institute of Technology who chaired MIT's department of nutrition and food science. She earned her B.A. from Barnard College in Latin American studies and Ph.D. in anthropology from Columbia University, where she studied under Margaret Mead. She taught at Columbia University and the University of California, Los Angeles, where she served as associate and acting dean of the UCLA Fielding School of Public Health. Her field of research is medial anthropology and she has focused on how gender, race, ethnicity, and culture affects public health practices.

Scrimshaw was named dean of the University of Illinois Chicago's School of Public Health in 1994, serving in that position until 2006, when she was named president of Simmons University. She remained president until 2008. She later became president of The Sage Colleges before stepping down in 2017.

Scrimshaw is a member of the Institute Of Medicine, later known as the National Academy of Medicine. At the time of her election in 1993, she and her father became the first father/daughter pair to become members of the IOM. She is also a fellow of the American Association for the Advancement of Science, the American Anthropological Association, Society for Applied Anthropology, and past president of the Society for Medical Anthropology. She was the recipient of the 1985 Margaret Mead Award for her work on cultural factors affecting healthcare delivery.
