= Eolyn Klugh Guy =

African-American social worker (1901–1963)

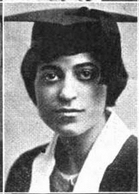
- Born: Eolyn Carolyn Klugh c. 1901
- Died: October 9, 1963
- Occupation: social worker
- Known for: settlement house and YWCA work

Eolyn Carolyn Klugh Guy (born about 1901 – died October 9, 1963) was an African-American social worker, active with the YWCA.

== Early life ==
Eolyn Carolyn Klugh was raised in New Haven, Connecticut and Boston, the daughter of David Simpson Klugh and Adella Plyman Klugh. Her father was a prominent Baptist clergyman in Boston; her mother was an alumna of Spelman Seminary and active in churchwomen's organizations. She attended Spelman Seminary and earned a bachelor's degree at Radcliffe College in 1922. She received a master's degree from Simmons College in 1928.

== Career ==
As a young woman, Klugh lived and worked at the Robert Gould Shaw House, a settlement house in Boston's South End. She attended the national meeting of the YWCA in 1924, as Girl Reserve and industrial secretary of the St. Aubin Branch of the YWCA in Detroit. In 1930 she attended the National Conference of Social Work in 1930, when it met in Boston.

She published her research as "Colored Girls at Work in Boston" (1928) in Opportunity, the magazine of the National Urban League. She spoke at Wellesley College in 1932 on "Extra-Curricular Activities for the Negro". In 1946 Eolyn Guy was named program director of the 12th Avenue Center YWCA in Tucson, Arizona. She also served on the board of the YWCA in Tucson.

== Personal life ==
Eolyn Klugh was a bridesmaid at the wedding of poet and social worker Clarissa Scott Delany in 1926, and attended her funeral the following year. Eolyn Klugh married Harry Maurice Guy in 1932. They had a son, Harry Maurice Guy Jr. Eolyn Klugh Guy died in 1963. Her papers are archived in the Bancroft Library at the University of California, Berkeley.
