= Stewart McKnight =

New Zealand cricketer (1935–2021)

Personal information
- Full name: Stewart Gemmell McKnight
- Born: 9 January 1935; Ranfurly, Central Otago, New Zealand
- Died: 8 January 2021 (aged 85); Ranfurly, Central Otago, New Zealand
- Batting: Right-handed
- Bowling: Right-arm off break
- Relatives: Ken McKnight (son)

Domestic team information
- Years: Team
- 1958/59–1966/67: Otago
- 1963/64–1976/77: Central Otago
- FC debut: 25 December 1958 Otago v Canterbury
- Last FC: 12 January 1967 Otago v Central Districts

Career statistics
Competition	First-class
Matches	7
Runs scored	123
Batting average	9.46
100s/50s	0/0
Top score	23
Catches/stumpings	2/–
- Source: ESPNcricinfo, 21 January 2021

Stewart Gemmell McKnight (9 January 1935 – 8 January 2021) was a New Zealand cricketer. He played seven first-class matches for Otago between the 1958–59 and 1966–67 seasons.

McKnight grew up on the family property at Ranfurly in Central Otago, where his father died in 1940 while mining for gold. He was educated at Otago Boys' High School in Dunedin and later farmed the property.

As well as playing first-class cricket for Otago, McKnight played Hawke Cup cricket for Central Otago from the 1963–64 season to 1976–77. He captained Central Otago against the touring Marylebone Cricket Club in 1960–61 at Alexandra, top-scoring with 48 in the second innings. He took part in a world tour with a New Zealand Cricket Council side in 1964, playing in 11 countries.

McKnight was also a rugby union referee, and represented New Zealand at curling. He was a life member of both the Otago Cricket Association and the Otago Rugby Football Union and was a cricket selector for Otago. His son, Ken McKnight, played for both Central Otago and Otago during the 1980s and 90s.

McKnight died at Ranfurly in 2021. He was aged 85.
