= Cheyney McKnight =

American historical interpreter

Cheyney McKnight is an African-American historical interpreter and educator, known for her interpretation company and online handle Not Your Momma's History.

== Early life and education ==
McKnight grew up in Atlanta and was interested in history from a young age, particularly her family's stories of the Civil Rights Movement.

She graduated from Simmons University, where she studied political science, in 2011.

== Historical interpretation ==
McKnight works as a historical interpreter at locations such as Colonial Williamsburg, Genesee Country Village and Museum, Historic Richmond Town, and Museum of the American Revolution to teach people about the lives of African Americans in American history, particularly during the 18th and 19th centuries. She also works with museums and their staff to create resources and improve staff's ability to educate visitors on slavery and African American history. McKnight is a member of the New York Historical Society.

McKnight began interpreting in 2013. Her first event was a reenactment of the Battle of Gettysburg, where she portrayed a 22-year old free woman. As she began participating in more events, she became disappointed with how African Americans were portrayed or discussed, often only in relation to who owned them rather than their own internal lives and experiences. In 2014, in response to these experiences, McKnight founded Not Your Momma's History, which offered workshops of her own making for museums and schools.

In 2017 McKnight officially began working solely on Not Your Momma's History. That same year, she staged a reoccurring work of performance art in Manhattan called #SlaveryMadePlain, during which she held a sign saying “What to a Slave Is the Fourth of July” while wearing historical dress.

In 2019 McKnight was included in the book The American Duchess Guide to 18th Century Beauty, where she spoke on enslaved people's dress and hair.

In November 2020 McKnight dressed as an enslaved mother and stood outside the U.S. Capitol to call attention both to how emancipated African Americans struggled to find their relatives after the Civil War, and the separation of families at the United States' southern border.

In 2021 McKnight was chosen as an African American Cultural Heritage Action Fund Fellow by the National Trust for Historic Preservation. As part of this, she created a project titled "The Ancestor’s Future: An Afrofuturist Journey Through History", which was staged at the Woodlawn & Pope-Leighey House as "both a piece of performance art and a conversation inspired by Afrofuturism".

In 2022 McKnight set up a portable table in different locations in New York City a few times a month, and encouraged passersby to speak to her and ask questions about slavery and its history in the city.

As of April 2023 McKnight's YouTube channel has 239,000 subscribers and more than 7.45 million total views.

== Personal life ==
McKnight is a direct descendent of enslaved African Americans. As of 2022, she lives in Harlem. McKnight also chooses to wear some historically inspired clothing in her day to day life, which she has referred to as a type of afrofuturism.
