= Senator McKnight =

Senator McKnight may refer to:

- Angela V. McKnight (born 1977), New Jersey State Senate
- Edwin T. McKnight (1869–1935), Massachusetts State Senate
- Joe McKnight (politician) (1933–2023), Tennessee State Senate
- John McKnight (Nebraska politician) (1906–1979), Nebraska State Senate
- Robert W. McKnight (born 1944), Florida State Senate

== See also ==
- Senator Knight (disambiguation)
