= Round Hill Park =

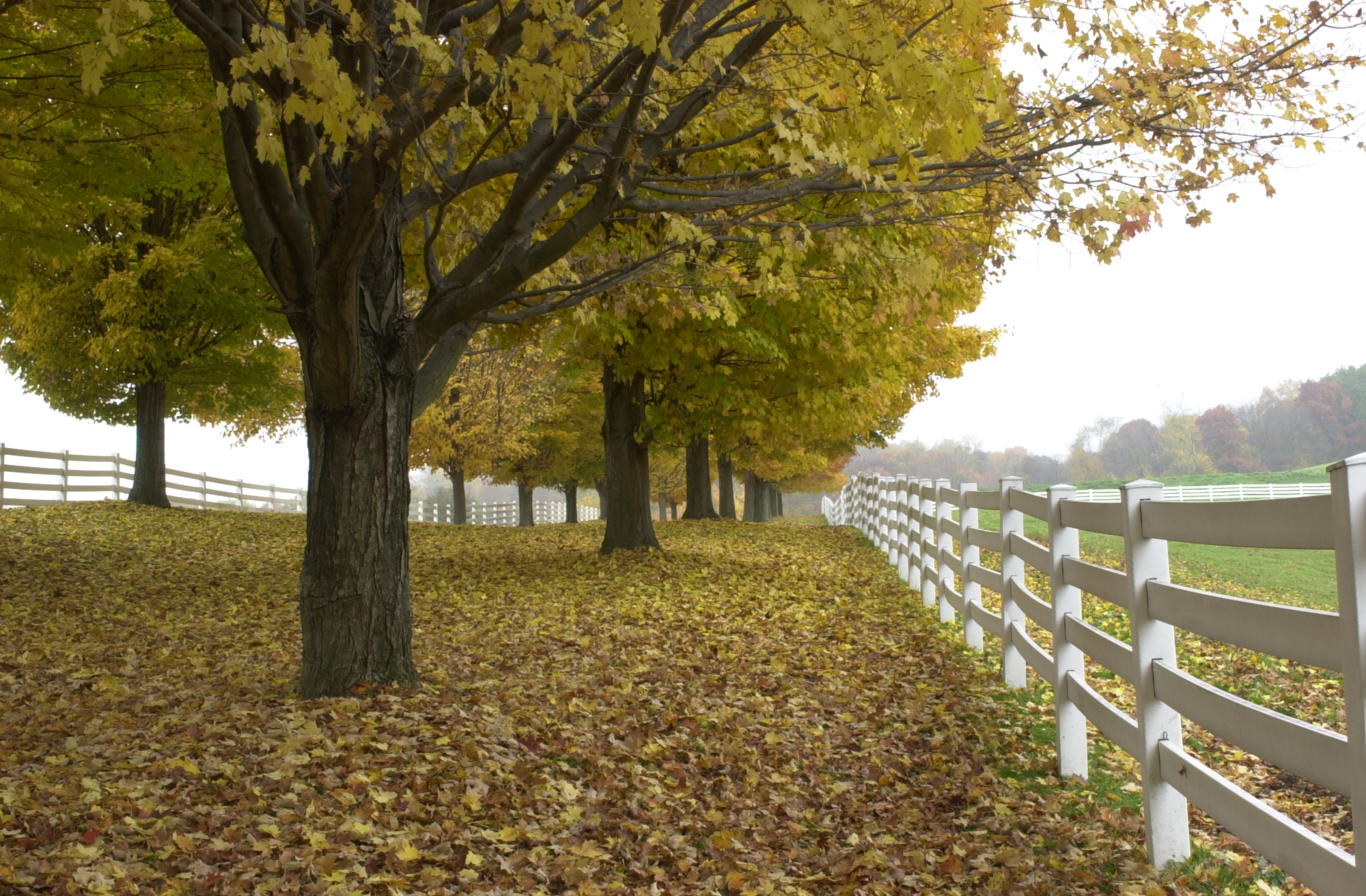
- Trees in autumn foliage along pasture in Round Hill Park, Allegheny County, Pennsylvania

- Location within Pennsylvania Location within the United States
- Type: Municipal
- Location: Allegheny County, Pennsylvania
- Coordinates: 40.24061°N 79.85841°W
- Area: 1,101-acre (4.46 km^{2})

Round Hill Park is a 1,101-acre (4.46 km^{2}) county park in Allegheny County, Pennsylvania, United States. It is a part of the county's 12,000-acre (49 km^{2}) network of nine distinct parks.

== Geography and notable features ==
This park is situated 15 miles (24 km) southeast of downtown Pittsburgh in Elizabeth Township and features a modern working demonstration farm that supplements the park itself.

Seventeen picnic groves reflect farm culture with names like Alfalfa, Timothy, Wagon Wheel, and Quiet Acres. The exhibit farm is open every day of the year and affords tens of thousands of school students on field trips, and daily visitors, an interpretive program that revolves around the farm, and the water and food cycles of life. It also offers soccer fields and gardens.
