= James McKnight =

James McKnight may refer to:

- James McKnight (American football) (born 1972), American football wide receiver
- James McKnight (footballer) (1889–1920), Irish footballer
- James Stuart McKnight (1884–1950), National Guard officer and member of the City Council in Los Angeles, California
- Jim McKnight (1936–1994), American baseball player

== See also ==
- James MacKnight (1721–1800), Scottish minister and theological author
- James MacKnight (agrarian reformer), Irish journalist and agrarian reformer
