= Gwethalyn Graham =

Canadian writer and activist

Gwethalyn Graham (January 18, 1913 – November 25, 1965) was a Canadian writer and activist, whose 1944 novel Earth and High Heaven was the first Canadian book to reach number one on the New York Times Best Seller list. Graham won the Governor General's Award for English-language fiction twice, for her first novel Swiss Sonata in 1938, and for Earth and High Heaven in 1944.

== Background ==
She was born Gwethalyn Graham Erichsen-Brown, to wealthy Toronto parents. Her father was a lawyer. At 19, she was a student at Smith College in Massachusetts, but dropped out and eloped with John McNaught, the son of her father's business partner. They divorced after two years, and Graham moved to the city of Westmount on the island of Montreal, where she became a close friend and associate of Hugh MacLennan, F. R. Scott, Thérèse Casgrain and Pierre Trudeau. Graham subsequently married David Yalden-Thomson, a philosophy professor at McGill University; they subsequently also divorced.

Graham's sister, Isabel LeBourdais, was a journalist whose 1966 book The Trial of Steven Truscott played a key role in disputing the evidence that led to Steven Truscott's controversial murder conviction, and her brother John Erichsen-Brown was a diplomat with the Canadian Department of External Affairs.

== Career ==
She wrote two abandoned early novels before completing Swiss Sonata, which was published in 1938.

Graham was also an outspoken activist against anti-Semitism and anti-French Canadian discrimination; Earth and High Heaven depicted an interfaith romance between a Protestant woman from Montreal and a Jewish man from Northern Ontario. The novel was optioned by Samuel Goldwyn for a film that was to star Katharine Hepburn; however, the film was never made, as Goldwyn abandoned the project after the similarly themed Gentleman's Agreement came out while Earth and High Heaven was still in development.

Graham's only published book after Earth and High Heaven was Dear Enemies, a non-fiction collection of her correspondence with journalist Solange Chaput-Rolland about English-French relations in Canada. She had postponed her planned third novel to work on the book. She also wrote a theatrical play, Trouble at Weti, and radio plays for CBC Radio, and translated works by writers from Quebec, most notably André Laurendeau's play Two Terrible Women (Deux femmes terribles), into English.

Graham died in 1965 of an undiagnosed brain tumour, aged 52. Her illness and death resulted in the cancellation of a planned sequel to Dear Enemies.

Both Swiss Sonata and Earth and High Heaven were reissued by Cormorant Books in 2004. Graham is the subject of a biography, Gwethalyn Graham: a Liberated Woman in a Conventional Age, by Barbara Meadowcroft (Toronto: Women's Press, 2008).
