= Alan Berg (nutritionist) =

American international development authority (born 1932)

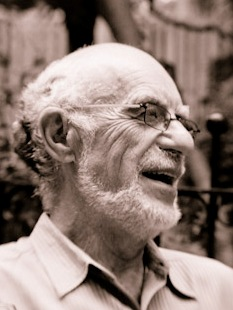

Deputy Director of the Food for Peace program (White House/Department of State)
- In office 1962–1965

Deputy Director of the Population and Nutrition Projects Department of World Bank
- In office 1972–1995

Personal details
- Born: February 18, 1932 (age 94) Dayton, Ohio, U.S.
- Known for: International nutrition

Alan D. Berg (born February 18, 1932) is an American former civil servant and nutritionist. He is recognized as an international development authority, most notable for his advocacy and large-scale implementation of programs to address malnutrition, particularly among children and pregnant women. His work spans over half a century and has garnered him wide recognition for instigating a new policy approach to international nutrition assistance.

Berg's contributions to the field of nutrition have had a significant impact on the way development agencies and governments approach the issue of malnutrition as a fundamental component of economic growth. His methods and approach, particularly during 23-year tenure as the senior nutrition officer at the World Bank from 1972 to 1995, have been widely adopted by other organizations and countries. Additionally, Berg's work has led to an increased focus on nutrition policy, planning, and implementation in academic training programs for nutritionists, creating new opportunities for graduates in this field.

In 1997, a survey of the international nutrition community found that Berg was the most-cited role model for newcomers to the field. His contributions to the field were further acknowledged in 2008, when he was honored by the United Nations Standing Committee on Nutrition as one of the first recipients of the United Nations Achievement Award for Lifelong Service to Nutrition, with the committee describing him as a "global giant in nutrition history".

== Career ==
=== White House (1962–1965) ===
Berg began his public service in nutrition as a staff member and then deputy director of the White House's Food for Peace program under John F. Kennedy and Lyndon B. Johnson. As deputy director, with the subsequent rank of deputy assistant secretary of state, he co-chaired the first White House Task Force on Nutrition, which explored the possibility of a role for the government in international nutrition assistance beyond disaster relief and institutional feeding programs.

=== India (1966–1970) ===
Berg was then selected by Ambassador Chester Bowles as head of the U.S. government's first national-scale, nutrition program. He moved to India and began his work with the Government of India. His work in India included the management of a large food aid program, the formation of an Indian food and pharmaceutical industry association to combat malnutrition, the introduction of social marketing techniques designed to alter consumer behavior in a nutritionally beneficial manner, and a number of new initiatives to fortify food staples with vitamins and minerals. Berg also initiated in 1969 the concept of Double Fortified Salt, adding iron as well as iodine to common salt, with the aim of reducing iron deficiency anemia without requiring changes in dietary practices.

When famine struck India in 1966-67, Berg coordinated a massive food aid distribution effort that is recognized as having saved millions of lives. The intervention earned him the U.S. government's annual award as the Outstanding Young Civil Servant in 1968. Lester R. Brown, often a critic of U.S. policies, later praised that relief effort: "For the United States, this was one of our finest moments."

During his appointment in India, Berg published in Foreign Affairs, "Malnutrition and National Development," the first in a series of articles and books arguing the case for inclusion of nutrition on the international development agenda. The writings cited evidence from numerous countries on the harmful effects of malnutrition, not only on child development and mortality, but also on economic growth.

=== Brookings and MIT (1970–1975) ===
Upon returning to the United States, Berg took a position as a senior fellow at the Brookings Institution. There, he wrote his book, The Nutrition Factor: Its Role in National Development, based on his experience in India. The book was reviewed by multiple academic journals. It was nominated for a National Book Award, cited the effect of poor nutritional status on mortality and on the cognitive development of survivors, underlining the far-reaching consequences of malnutrition.

Berg also served as visiting professor of nutrition policy and planning at the Massachusetts Institute of Technology from 1972 to 1976, where he organized and led a conference that drew government ministers and international development authorities. He then served as a co-author of another book, Nutrition, National Development, and Planning. During these years, Berg also chaired the Nutrition Panel of the National Academy of Sciences' World Food and Nutrition Study (1975). His work attracted the attention of policymakers and is largely recognized with establishing nutrition as a crucial aspect of international development strategies and devising multisectoral planning tools to address it.

=== World Bank (1972–1995) ===
In 1972, Berg joined World Bank as Deputy Director of the new Population and Nutrition Projects Department after an invitation by the president of World Bank, Robert McNamara to join the organization. During the twenty-three years of Berg's tenure, the size of nutrition operations generated by the Bank (free-standing nutrition projects and nutrition components of health, education, agriculture, rural development, and social protection projects), earlier negligible, totaled $2.1 billion, significantly more than the spending of all other donors combined.

Berg's call for due attention to nutrition, as a key component of both economic development and human wellbeing, has been widely acknowledged within the World Bank and internationally. One prominent Bank official publicly referred to him as "the conscience of the Bank on hunger issues."

In 1987, Berg published another book, Malnutrition: What Can be Done?: Lessons from World Bank Experience, that was reviewed by multiple journals.

=== Global nutrition advocacy (1995–present) ===
Following Berg's retirement from the World Bank in 1995, he has served as an adviser or consultant to a number of international non-governmental organizations, as well as the World Bank through 2014. He also, through 2010, returned to the Brookings Institution as a Guest Scholar. He continues to serve as a board member of the public health organization Calcutta Kids, providing health and nutrition services to mothers and young children in Indian slums. He maintains active involvement in the development of double-fortified salt.

In addition, Berg has written articles and opinion pieces for Foreign Affairs, The New York Times, Harvard Business Review, The Washington Post, and The American Journal of Clinical Nutrition, among other publications.

== Bibliography ==
- Berg, Alan D.; Holcombe, John (1957). MAP [Military Assistance Program] for Security, University of South Carolina Press.
- Berg, Alan D.; Scrimshaw, Nevin S.; Call, David L. (1971). Nutrition, National Development, and Planning, MIT Press.
- Berg, Alan D. (1973). The Nutrition Factor: Its Role in National Development, Brookings.
- Berg, Alan D. (1981). Malnourished People: A Policy View, World Bank.
- Berg, Alan D. (1987). Malnutrition: What Can be Done? : Lessons from World Bank Experience, Johns Hopkins University Press.

=== Editor ===
- Berg, Alan D. International Agricultural Research and Human Nutrition, coeditor with Per Pinstrup-Andersen and Martin Forman (International Food Policy Research Institute and United Nations Standing Committee on Nutrition, 1984)

=== Selected articles ===
- "Nutrition as a National Priority: Lessons from the India Experiment"
- "Famine contained: notes and lessons from the Bihar experience"
- "Nutrition, national development, and planning: proceedings of an international conference"

== Awards and recognitions ==
Berg received the William A. Jump Award as the Outstanding Young (under 37) Public Servant in U.S. Government for his work in India during the 1960s. He was named a Belding Scholar by the Foundation for Child Development. In 1992, he was awarded the Society of Nutrition Education's "Voices Who Have Changed Nutrition" Award.

In 2008, Berg received the United Nations Achievement Award for Lifelong Service to Nutrition.

Berg was also recognized for the project conception and development of "Bon Appétit!", the nutrition-themed 2003 album that won the Grammy Award for Best Musical Album for Children.
