= John McKnight (English footballer) =

English footballer

Personal information
- Full name: John McKnight
- Position: Centre forward

Senior career*
Years	Team	Apps	(Gls)
1892–1893	Middlesbrough Ironopolis		
1893–1894	Darwen	24	(10)
1894–1895	Burnley	22	(6)
- * Club domestic league appearances and goals

John McKnight was a professional footballer who played as a centre forward. He played almost fifty matches in the Football League with Burnley and Darwen, and also played for Middlesbrough Ironopolis in the Northern Football League.

== Playing career ==
=== Early career ===
McKnight began as a centre forward with Grimsby Town in September 1889, in the opening match of the 1889–90 season. He also played for Aston Villa before joining Middlesbrough Ironopolis, where he played from 1892 to 1893. One review during his time with Aston Villa in 1891 described McKnight as "elephantine". At the end of the 1892 season with Ironopolis, it was reported that "McKnight makes a wonderful difference in the team", which had averaged one goal per game when he was absent for a stretch, but "since his reappearance... registered 20 goals in four matches". It was also reported at that time that McKnight and other core players had signed on with Middlesbrough for the next season.

=== Darwen ===
In March 1893, it was reported that "McKnight, the centre-forward of the Middlesbrough Club, has been engaged by Darwen". Later that year, it was speculated that "McKnight, ex-Grimsby, ex-Aston Villa, ex-Middlesboro, ex-nearly everywhere, is likely to leave Darwen for Ardwick", although this departure did not materialise, and McKnight remained with Darwen for the following year.

In the January 1894 FA Cup first round match between Darwen and Derby County, McKnight "got off capitally" in a corner recovery of a blocked goal attempt against Darwen, then had a goal attempt of his own blocked despite being "an excellent shot", and "was caught red-handed by the referee when getting up after his dirty work, and he was promptly cautioned, some laughter being caused by the offender being on his knees". Later in the season, McKnight was singled out for praise in Darwen's 3–0 victory over Walsall Town Swifts, scoring one goal "with a high shot", assisting with another, and scoring a goal from offside towards the end of the match. In total he made 24 appearances in the Football League for Darwen, scoring 10 goals.

=== Burnley ===
After two seasons with Darwen, McKnight moved to Burnley of the First Division. In September 1894, McKnight was injured in one game, having to be carried from the field with a twisted knee during a match against Nottingham Forest, in which McKnight's scoring efforts had been frustrated several times during the game. Later that month, however, McKnight scored the winning goal in a 2–1 victory over Wolverhampton Wanderers, though some observers felt that the player McKnight received the ball from was offside, and the goal should not have counted.

In a March 1895 match against Small Heath, McKnight was criticised for "harassing and questionable tactics", including a blow to the ribs of an opposing player that caused a stoppage of the game, which Burnley went on to lose. McKnight was again frustrated in an April 1895 match against Aston Villa, being called for a foul while "bearing down on the home goal" in a match that Burnley lost 5–0. In total he made 22 Football League appearances for Burnley, scoring 6 goals.
