= Robert M. Lawton =

American businessman and politician (1931–2021)

- Lawton pictured at the entrance to Funspot circa 2010s

Member of the New Hampshire House of Representatives
- In office 1969–1970

Member of the New Hampshire House of Representatives from the Belknap 2nd district
- In office 1970–1972

Member of the New Hampshire House of Representatives from the Belknap 1st district
- In office 1972–1980

Member of the New Hampshire House of Representatives from the Belknap 7th district
- In office 1994–2000

Personal details
- Born: Robert Marcyes Lawton; March 2, 1931 Akron, Ohio, U.S.
- Died: November 11, 2021 (aged 90) Concord, New Hampshire, U.S.
- Party: Republican
- Children: 4; including David M. Lawton
- Parent: Doris L. Thompson (mother)
- Education: Norwich University
- Occupation: Businessman

Robert Marcyes Lawton (March 2, 1931 – November 11, 2021) was an American businessman and politician. A member of the Republican Party, he served in the New Hampshire House of Representatives from 1969 to 1980 and again from 1994 to 2000. As a businessman, he was the founder of Funspot, an arcade complex in Weirs Beach, Laconia, New Hampshire.

== Life and career ==
Lawton was born in Akron, Ohio, the son of Richard Marcyes Lawton and Doris L. Thompson, a New Hampshire representative. He attended Norwich University, earning his Bachelor of Science degree in chemistry in 1952. After earning his degree, in 1952, he founded Funspot, an amusement arcade in Laconia, New Hampshire. His amusement arcade was recognized by Guinness World Records as the largest arcade in the world.

Lawton served in the New Hampshire House of Representatives from 1969 to 1980 and again from 1994 to 2000. During his service in the House, in 1969, he introduced the bill to print the state's official state motto phrase "Live Free or Die" to appear on all non-commercial license plates.

== Death ==
Lawton died on November 11, 2021, at the Concord Hospital in Concord, New Hampshire, at the age of 90.
