= Ken McKnight =

New Zealand cricketer (born 1964)

Personal information
- Full name: Kenneth James McKnight
- Born: 8 April 1964 (age 62); Ranfurly, Central Otago, New Zealand
- Batting: Left-handed
- Role: Wicket-keeper
- Relatives: Stewart McKnight (father)

Domestic team information
- Years: Team
- 1983/84–1996/97: Central Otago
- 1987/88–1991/92: Otago
- FC debut: 13 January 1988 Otago v Northern Districts
- Last FC: 6 December 1991 Otago v Northern Districts

Career statistics
Competition	First-class
Matches	8
Runs scored	172
Batting average	15.63
100s/50s	0/1
Top score	56*
Catches/stumpings	15/3
- Source: ESPNcricinfo, 21 January 2021

Kenneth James McKnight (born 8 April 1964) is a New Zealand former cricketer. He played eight first-class matches for Otago between the 1987–88 and 1991–92 seasons.

McKnight was born at Ranfurly in Central Otago in 1964, the son of Stewart McKnight, a farmer who had played seven times for Otago and represented New Zealand at curling. Ken McKnight was educated at Otago Boys' High School in Dunedin and played age-group cricket for Otago in the 1982–83 season before making his Hawke Cup debut for Central Otago the following season.

McKnight's highest first-class score was 56 not out against Central Districts in 1988-89, when he helped Otago save the match after they followed on 231 runs behind. Later he captained Central Otago to their only Hawke Cup title when they defeated Taranaki in January 1996. He now lives in Queensland.
