= John McNaught =

Canadian broadcaster and writer

- Born: John Charles Kirkpatrick McNaught; March 23, 1902
- Died: July 9, 1970 (aged 68)
- Other names: James Bannerman, George Austen, Mark Carter, Peter Davidson, Robert Elliott, Pierre Lousanne, Lajos Dohanyi Lajos
- Occupation: writer
- Years active: 1949-1970

John Charles Kirkpatrick McNaught (March 23, 1902–July 9, 1970) was a Canadian radio broadcaster and writer. He was an announcer for CBC Radio and a host on CBC Television in the 1950s and 1960s. He was best known by the professional pseudonym James Bannerman; he also used a variety of other pseudonyms in his work as an author, critic, and screenwriter.

He was born in Toronto, Ontario, and educated at Upper Canada College and the University of Toronto. He was briefly married to writer Gwethalyn Graham in the early 1930s.

He wrote many broadcast scripts and also contributed articles to magazines, including Canadian Home Journal, Maclean's, Mademoiselle, and Mayfair. Following his death in 1970, his widow Emily donated many of his papers and journals to McMaster University.

During the Second World War, McNaught was commissioned into the Royal Canadian Navy Volunteer Reserve at the rank of lieutenant in 1940. He served on HMCS Columbia and HMCS Bayfield and was the commanding officer of the latter unit from 16 October to 22 December 1944. He was released following the war.
