= William Gray McNaught =

English music critic and teacher

William Gray McNaught (30 March 1849 – 13 October 1918) was an English music teacher, journalist and editor who became an adjudicator and inspector of music for schools.

Born in Mile End, London, McNaught learned tonic sol-fa in the school classroom and sang in concerts for the Tonic Sol-fa Association at The Crystal Palace. While working as a coffee importer, he taught himself violin and conducting, then began teaching music classes in his spare time. He studied at the Royal Academy of Music from 1872-6 under George Macfarren. While there he became friendly with fellow student Edward German.

In 1883, he was appointed as an assistant inspector of music in training colleges by John Stainer, and soon became an expert in the practical side of school music making. He also became editor of Novello's School Music Review, founded in 1892. But on Stainer's death in 1901 he expected to succeed him as Inspector of Music. When Arthur Somervell was appointed instead, he resigned.

From 1892 until his death, McNaught was an active choral conductor and remained an ardent supporter of tonic sol-fa. He was appointed as the editor of The Musical Times in 1909, where he wrote a series of articles on cathedrals and their musical associations. His publications include the influential School Music Teacher (1889) and Hints on Choir Training for Competition (1896).

== William McNaught ==
His son William McNaught (1 September 1883 – 9 June 1953) was educated at University College School, Hampstead, and Worcester College, Oxford, but never took a music degree. Like his father he also became editor of The Musical Times, succeeding Harvey Grace, from March 1944 until his death in 1953, and acted as an adjudicator for music festivals.

As a music critic he wrote for publications including The Manchester Guardian, The Morning Post, The Glasgow Herald, the London The Evening News (1933-1939), The Listener and The Radio Times. His books included A Short Account of Modern Music and Musicians (1937). From 1938 he edited the Novello Biographies of Great Musicians series of pamphlets, writing the Beethoven (1940) and Elgar (1947) volumes himself. He was also an amateur climber and a member of the Alpine Club from 1926.
