= Comet McNaught (disambiguation) =

Comet McNaught can refer to any one of more than 50 comets discovered by the astronomer Robert H. McNaught.

== Long-period and single-apparition comets ==
- C/1987 U3
- C/2005 E2
- C/2005 L2
- C/2005 L3
- C/2005 S4
- C/2006 B1
- C/2006 E1
- C/2006 K1
- C/2006 K3
- C/2006 L2
- C/2006 P1, also known as the Great Comet of 2007.
- C/2006 Q1
- C/2007 K6
- C/2007 M1
- C/2007 P1
- C/2007 T1
- C/2007 Y2
- C/2008 A1
- C/2008 J4
- C/2009 F2
- C/2009 F4
- C/2009 F5
- C/2009 K5
- C/2009 R1
- C/2009 T1
- C/2010 J2
- C/2011 C1
- C/2011 G1
- C/2011 L2
- C/2011 L3
- C/2011 N2
- C/2011 Q2
- C/2011 R1
- C/2012 C1
- C/2012 H2
- C/2012 K6
- C/2012 T4
- C/2012 Y3
- C/2013 E1
- C/2013 F3
- C/2013 G2
- C/2013 G7
- C/2013 J3
- C/2013 O3

== Short-period comets ==
- 191P/McNaught
- 220P/McNaught (outburst from magnitude 18 to magnitude 8 in June 2026)
- 254P/McNaught (P/2010 T1)
- 260P/McNaught (P/2005 K3)
- 278P/McNaught (P/2006 K2)
- 284P/McNaught (P/2007 H1)
- 320P/McNaught (P/2004 R1)
- 336P/McNaught (P/2006 G1)
- 338P/McNaught (P/2008 J3)
- 350P/McNaught (P/2010 J5)
- 353P/McNaught (P/2009 S2)
- 372P/McNaught (P/2008 O2)
- 378P/McNaught (P/2005 Y2)
- 401P/McNaught (P/2006 H1)
- 421P/McNaught (P/2009 U4)
- 442P/McNaught
- 446P/McNaught (P/2022 G2)
- P/2005 J1
- P/2005 L1
- P/2008 Y3
- P/2009 Q5
- C/2011 L1
- P/2011 P1
- P/2012 O1
- P/2012 O2
- P/2013 J2

== Others ==
"Comet McNaught" may also be an incomplete reference to a comet co-discovered by Robert McNaught. These include:

- Comet 319P/Catalina-McNaught (P/Catalina-McNaught 2008 S1, 2008 JK)
- Comet McNaught-Hartley, any of:
  - 318P/McNaught-Hartley (P/1994 N2, P/2014 M6, 1994 XXXI, 1994n)
  - X/1987 A2 (P/2013 Y3), later rediscovered as 449P/Leonard (P/2020 S6)
  - C/1999 T1
- Comet McNaught-Hughes, either of:
  - C/1990 M1 (1991 III, 1990g)
  - 130P/McNaught-Hughes (130P/1991 S1, 1991 IX, 1991y, 130P/1997 H1)
- Comet McNaught-Russell, any of:
  - C/1991 C3 (1990 XIX, 1991g)
  - C/1991 Q1 (1992 XI, 1991v)
  - C/1991 R1 (1990 XXII, 1991w)
  - C/1993 Y1 (1994 XI, 1993v)
  - P/1994 X1 (1994 XXIV, 1994u)
- Comet McNaught-Tritton (C/1978 G2, 1978 XXVII)
- Comet McNaught-Watson (C/1999 S2)
