= LZ1 =

LZ1 may refer to the following:

- Zeppelin LZ 1, the first Zeppelin rigid airship
- LZ1 (algorithm), a lossless data compression algorithm
- Led Zeppelin (album), the first album by Led Zeppelin
- LZ1 (Lanzarote), a road in the Canary Islands
- 2012 LZ1, a Near-Earth Asteroid
- Landing Zone 1, a rocket landing pad operated by SpaceX

== See also ==
- LZI (disambiguation)
