= Bobbie Vaile =

Australian astronomer

Roberta Anne Vaile
- Born: 25 June 1959; Junee, New South Wales
- Died: 13 November 1996 (aged 37)
- Other name: 'Bobbie' Vaile
- Education: University of New South Wales
- Occupation: astrophysicist
- Known for: "Unsung Hero of Australian Science" award

Dr Roberta Anne 'Bobbie' Vaile (25 June 1959 – 13 November 1996) was an Australian astrophysicist and senior lecturer in physics at the Faculty of Business and Technology at the University of Western Sydney, Macarthur. She was involved with Project Phoenix (a SETI experiment) and influential in the establishment of the SETI Australia Centre, created at the university in 1995.

== Biography ==
Vaile was born in Junee, New South Wales. She attended the University of Newcastle, where she received her B.Sc. She earned her Ph.D. at the University of New South Wales with a thesis entitled "The Corona Australis Complex" in 1989.

Vale was awarded the Australian Science Communicators' "Unsung Hero of Australian Science" award in 1995 for her work in developing easy and friendly methods of teaching science.

Other published papers include: Seth Shostak, Ron Ekers, Roberta Vaile, 1996. A Search for Artificial Signals from the Small Magellanic Cloud The Astronomical Journal 112, 164-166.

== Death and legacy ==
Valie died in 1996 following a seven-year battle with an inoperable brain tumour.

A memorial garden at the University of Western Sydney was dedicated to Vaile in 1999, and there is a park/reserve in Camden, New South Wales (at 34°03′33″S 150°42′42″E), named after her.

The binary main-belt asteroid 6708 Bobbievaile, discovered by Australian astronomer Robert McNaught in 1989, was also named in her memory; the naming citation was published on 22 April 1997 (M.P.C. 29671).
