= 5682 Beresford =

Mars-crossing asteroid

Discovery
- Discovered by: R. H. McNaught
- Discovery site: Siding Spring Obs.
- Discovery date: 9 October 1990

Designations
- Named after: Tony Beresford (Australian amateur astronomer)
- Alternative designations: 1990 TB · 1969 PP; 1983 RV_{5}
- Minor planet category: Mars crosser

Orbital characteristics
- Epoch 27 April 2019 (JD 2458600.5)
- Uncertainty parameter 0
- Observation arc: 68.89 yr (25,163 d)
- Aphelion: 2.9826 AU
- Perihelion: 1.6114 AU
- Semi-major axis: 2.2970 AU
- Eccentricity: 0.2985
- Orbital period (sidereal): 3.48 yr (1,272 d)
- Mean anomaly: 77.335°
- Mean motion: 0° 16^{m} 59.16^{s} / day
- Inclination: 7.9606°
- Longitude of ascending node: 212.78°
- Argument of perihelion: 138.58°
- Earth MOID: 0.616 AU (240 LD)

Physical characteristics
- Mean diameter: 4.125±0.661 km 5.66 km (calculated); 7.33±0.73 km
- Synodic rotation period: 3.769±0.005 h (Note: Brian A. Skiff (2011) web, rotation period 3.769±0.005 hours with a brightness amplitude of 0.08 mag. Quality code is 3-. Summary figures for (5682) Beresford at the LCDB.)
- Geometric albedo: 0.109; 0.20 (assumed); 0.365±0.145
- Spectral type: S (assumed)
- Absolute magnitude (H): 13.60; 13.70

5682 Beresford, provisional designation 1990 TB is a stony asteroid and sizable Mars-crosser from the inner regions of the asteroid belt, approximately 6 kilometers (3.7 miles) in diameter. It was discovered on 9 October 1990, by astronomer Robert McNaught at the Siding Spring Observatory in Australia. The assumed S-type asteroid has a short rotation period of 3.8 hours. It was named after Australian amateur astronomer Anthony Beresford.

== Orbit and classification ==
Beresford is a member of the Mars-crossing asteroids, a dynamically unstable group between the main belt and the near-Earth populations, crossing the orbit of Mars at 1.66 AU. It orbits the Sun at a distance of 1.61–2.98 AU once every 3 years and 6 months (1,272 days; semi-major axis of 2.3 AU). Its orbit has an eccentricity of 0.30 and an inclination of 8° with respect to the ecliptic. The body's observation arc begins with a precovery taken at Palomar Observatory in November 1949, or almost 41 years prior to its official discovery observation at Siding Spring in October 1990.

== Naming ==
This minor planet was named after Tony Beresford (Anthony Charles Beresford; born 1942), an Australian amateur astronomer who has been an active observer of artificial satellites as part of the Operation Moonwatch program. He has also been instrumental in the distribution of astronomical information and discoveries in South Australia. The name was suggested by Duncan I. Steel and the official citation was published by the Minor Planet Center on 2 April 1999 (M.P.C. 34341).

== Physical characteristics ==
Beresford is an assumed, stony S-type asteroid, the most common spectral type in the inner region of the Solar System.

=== Rotation period ===
In October 2011, a rotational lightcurve of Beresford was obtained from photometric observations by Brian Skiff. Lightcurve analysis gave a rotation period of 3.769±0.005 hours with a brightness variation of 0.08±0.01 magnitude (U=3-), indicative of a spherical shape. The result supersedes an alternative period solution of 7.536±0.002 hours (twice the period) with an amplitude of 0.20 magnitude previously obtained by Robert A. Koff at the Antelope Hills Observatory (H09) in Colorado in October 2004 (U=2). (Note: Lightcurve plot of (5682) Beresford , by Robert A. Koff at the Antelope Hills Observatory (H09). Rotation period: 7.536±0.002 hours with a brightness amplitude of 0.20 mag. Quality code is 2. Summary figures at the LCDB.)

=== Diameter and albedo ===
According to the survey carried out by the NEOWISE mission of NASA's Wide-field Infrared Survey Explorer, Beresford measures 4.13 kilometers in diameter and its surface has an albedo of 0.36(5). However, a 2017-WISE-study dedicated to Mars-crossing asteroids determined a larger diameter of 7.33 kilometers due to a much lower albedo of 0.109. The Collaborative Asteroid Lightcurve Link assumes a standard albedo for as stony asteroid of 0.20 and derives a diameter of 5.66 kilometers based on an absolute magnitude of 13.6.

==== Sizable Mars-crosser ====
With a diameter of up to 7.3 kilometers, Beresford is still one of the smaller "sizable" Mars-crossing asteroids (5–15 km). These include 3581 Alvarez (13.69 km) 1065 Amundsenia (9.75 km), 1139 Atami (9.35 km), 3737 Beckman (14.36 km), 1474 Beira (15.46 km), 1011 Laodamia (7.39 km), 1727 Mette (5.44 km), 1131 Porzia (7.13 km), 1235 Schorria (5.55 km), 985 Rosina (8.18 km), 1310 Villigera (15.24 km), and 1468 Zomba (7 km), which are smaller than the largest members of this dynamical group, namely, 132 Aethra, 323 Brucia (former Mars-crosser), 1508 Kemi, 2204 Lyyli and 512 Taurinensis, all larger than 20 kilometers.
