= Kridsadaporn =

- Pronunciation: Thai: [krìt.sà.dāː.pʰɔ̄ːn]
- Gender: Male
- Language: Thai

Origin
- Origin: Sanskrit + Pali
- Meaning: A blessing from the Buddha; a child, gifted with divine qualities and supernatural powers.
- Region of origin: Thailand

Kridsadaporn (กฤษฎาพร or กฤษดาพร, Thai pronunciation: [krìt.sà.dāː.pʰɔ̄ːn], RTGS: Kritsadaphon) is a Thai name. It comprises two words: kritsada (กฤษฎา), from Sanskrit kṛṣṭā, meaning "supernatural powers, divine, celestial"; and phon (พร), meaning "blessing, benediction, favour". (Note: Alternative romanisations include gritsada, kritsada and kruetsada, and pon.)

Often Thai first names are suffixed with phon, denoting "a blessing from the Buddha", referring to both the gift of a child, and the favour of particular attributes, referred to within the name, manifesting within the child. In Thai tradition, a child's name is chosen using complex Buddhist name giving rituals where Thai astrology is widely used, often in consultation with a Buddhist monk. Parents of a newly-born child named Kridsadaporn (กฤษฎาพร) may believe, or may accept, the name's meaning as, "a blessing from the Buddha; a child, gifted with divine qualities and supernatural powers".

== See also ==
- Asteroid 7604 Kridsadaporn
