= 5475 Hanskennedy =

Asteroid

Discovery
- Discovered by: R. H. McNaught
- Discovery site: Siding Spring Obs.
- Discovery date: 26 August 1989

Designations
- Named after: Hans Kennedy (Dutch-Australian astronomer)
- Alternative designations: 1989 QO
- Minor planet category: main-belt (inner) · Hungaria

Orbital characteristics
- Epoch 4 September 2017 (JD 2458000.5)
- Uncertainty parameter 0
- Observation arc: 43.64 yr (15,939 days)
- Aphelion: 2.1487 AU
- Perihelion: 1.6876 AU
- Semi-major axis: 1.9181 AU
- Eccentricity: 0.1202
- Orbital period (sidereal): 2.66 yr (970 days)
- Mean anomaly: 120.29°
- Mean motion: 0° 22^{m} 15.6^{s} / day
- Inclination: 24.148°
- Longitude of ascending node: 107.93°
- Argument of perihelion: 307.80°

Physical characteristics
- Dimensions: 2.32 km (calculated)
- Synodic rotation period: 66.9±0.5 h
- Geometric albedo: 0.30 (assumed)
- Spectral type: C (SDSS-MFB)
- Absolute magnitude (H): 14.52±1.24; 15.1

5475 Hanskennedy, provisional designation 1989 QO, is a Hungaria asteroid from the innermost region of the asteroid belt, approximately 2.3 kilometers in diameter. It was discovered on 26 August 1989, by Scottish-Australian astronomer Robert McNaught at the Siding Spring Observatory in Canberra, Australia. It is named after Hans Kennedy, a Dutch-Australian astronomer known for his work with photographing binary stars.

== Biography: Hans Kennedy ==
This asteroid is named for Hans Kennedy, who was born in 1924 in Amsterdam in the Netherlands. After five years in India and New Zealand as an engineer, he left Christchurch in 1962 for Sydney. Initially working at the division of Astronomy and Physics at the CSIRO, he developed a multi-exposure technique to observe potential flare stars, using a scanning densitometer. He selected contact binaries as his primary area of research and recorded period changes of 24 contact binaries. He investigated the effect of using an incorrect ephemeris to determine times of minimum light and analysed the nature of abrupt period changes, concluding that they are non-existent. He indicated that periods of broken contact must be of limited duration due to the formation of a gas stream between the binary components and demonstrated that asymmetric minima are caused by dark magnetic spots. Despite criticism, he predicted the existence of large equal-mass binaries which were discovered in 2007. He developed a technique to observe the light from faint binaries during minimum light when they become invisible at visible wavelengths, using an integrator.

Hans Kennedy was also instrumental in the discovery of the atmosphere of Pluto and was requested by NASA to photographically track several Apollo missions. He participated in photo-electric observations of the asteroid Kleopatra and found that it is an elongated metallic object consisting of an alloy of iron and nickel.

Kennedy was a close associate of Gerald Kron (US Naval Observatory)and Bart Bok (University of Arizona). He produced over 32 papers and publications. Although retired, he is analysing Schmidt plates and involved in research of binaries.
