= Shaun M. Hughes =

Australian astronomer

Shaun M. Hughes was an Australian astronomer at Siding Spring Observatory.

He co-discovered the periodic comet 130P/McNaught-Hughes.

Shaun Hughes left Siding Spring Observatory in 1992 for a fellowship at the California Institute of Technology, where he joined one of the Hubble Space Telescope Key Project teams, to measure the expansion rate of the universe, also known as the Hubble constant. This was achieved by observing Cepheid variable stars to measure distances to about 20 galaxies, then using these distances to tie together various other methods for measuring distances to thousands of galaxies.

He also pursued his research on Mira variables, also known as Long period variable stars. These are stars that are similar mass as the sun, only older, after they have become red giants, just prior to becoming planetary nebulae.

In 1994 he joined the Royal Greenwich Observatory in Cambridge, England, where he continued his research and supported UK astronomers observe at the Roque de los Muchachos Observatory.

In 1998 the UK government, on the advice of some university astronomers, decided to close the Royal Greenwich Observatory. He then had a choice of moving his family back to the United States and stay working in astronomy, or change careers and stay in Cambridge. He chose the latter, and is now a business analyst with Convergys.

== Bibliography (selected) ==
- The Hubble Space Telescope extragalactic distance scale key project. 2: Photometry of WFC images of M81
