= (5645) 1990 SP =

Eccentric and tumbling asteroid

Discovery
- Discovered by: R. H. McNaught
- Discovery site: Siding Spring Obs.
- Discovery date: 20 September 1990

Designations
- Minor planet category: Apollo · NEO

Orbital characteristics
- Epoch 4 September 2017 (JD 2458000.5)
- Uncertainty parameter 0
- Observation arc: 40.89 yr (14,935 days)
- Aphelion: 1.8798 AU
- Perihelion: 0.8302 AU
- Semi-major axis: 1.3550 AU
- Eccentricity: 0.3873
- Orbital period (sidereal): 1.58 yr (576 days)
- Mean anomaly: 339.42°
- Mean motion: 0° 37^{m} 29.64^{s} / day
- Inclination: 13.507°
- Longitude of ascending node: 45.762°
- Argument of perihelion: 48.178°
- Earth MOID: 0.0537 AU

Physical characteristics
- Dimensions: 1.648 km 1.65 km (taken); 1.668±0.018 km 1.849±0.334 km 2.20±0.74 km
- Synodic rotation period: 30.39±0.04 h
- Geometric albedo: 0.06±0.08; 0.062±0.079; 0.068±0.032; 0.0827; 0.121±0.022
- Spectral type: P · CXT · S
- Absolute magnitude (H): 16.75±0.2 (R) · 16.8 · 17.1 · 17.20±0.3 · 17.24±0.206

(5645) 1990 SP is an eccentric and tumbling asteroid, classified as a near-Earth object of the Apollo group, approximately 1.7 kilometers in diameter. It was discovered on 20 September 1990, by Scottish–Australian astronomer Robert McNaught at the Siding Spring Observatory in Canberra, Australia. Scientists have said that it has a '1 in 364 billion chance' of colliding with the Earth.

== Orbit and classification ==
The asteroid orbits the Sun at a distance of 0.8–1.9 AU once every 1 years and 7 months (576 days). Its orbit has an eccentricity of 0.39 and an inclination of 14° with respect to the ecliptic.

=== Close approaches ===
This near-Earth asteroid has an Earth minimum orbit intersection distance of 0.055 AU (8,200,000 km), only slightly above the threshold minimum distance of 19.5 lunar distances (0.05 AU) to make it a potentially hazardous object. It also makes close approaches to Mars. On 14 April 1969, it passed the Red Planet at only 0.013 AU (1,900,000 km).

=== Precovery ===
Published by the Digitized Sky Survey (DSS), a first precovery was taken at the discovering observatory in 1974, extending the asteroid's observation arc by 16 years prior to its discovery.

== Physical characteristics ==
The stony S-type asteroid is also characterized as a P-type, based on post-cryogenic observations by the Spitzer Space Telescope, while observations at the NASA Infrared Telescope Facility using its SpeX instrument during a follow-up campaign of the Spitzer-observed objects between 2009 and 2012, gave it a C/X/T spectral type.

=== Rotation ===
In April 2002, Czech astronomer Petr Pravec obtained a rotational lightcurve from a photometric observations, which gave a relatively long period of 30.39±0.04 hours with a brightness variation of 0.7 in magnitude (U=2). The observations have also shown that the body is most likely in a tumbling motion.

=== Diameter and albedo ===
Estimates for the body's diameter range from 1.6 to 2.2 kilometers with an albedo for its surface between 0.06 and 0.12, according to observations made by the NEOWISE mission of NASA's Wide-field Infrared Survey Explorer and by the Spitzer Space Telescope. The Collaborative Asteroid Lightcurve Link takes the revised WISE data – an albedo of 0.0872 and a diameter of 1.65 kilometers – as the best of all available results.
