= P/2011 P1 (McNaught) =

Destroyed Jupiter family comet

Discovery
- Discovered by: Robert H. McNaught
- Discovery site: Siding Spring, Australia
- Discovery date: 1 August 2011

Orbital characteristics
- Epoch: 12 August 2011 (JD 2455793.5)
- Observation arc: 1.14 yr (415 days)
- Earliest precovery date: 6 December 2010
- Number of observations: 161
- Orbit type: Jupiter family · periodic
- Aphelion: 10.692 AU
- Perihelion: 4.952 AU
- Semi-major axis: 7.822 AU
- Eccentricity: 0.3669
- Orbital period: 21.88 years
- Inclination: 6.309°
- Longitude of ascending node: 10.082°
- Argument of periapsis: 342.120°
- Last perihelion: 24 July 2010
- T_{Jupiter}: 2.933
- Jupiter MOID: 0.001862 AU (278,600 km)

Physical characteristics
- Spectral type: (B–V) = 0.89±0.09 (V–R) = 0.42±0.07
- Comet total magnitude (M1): 6.8
- Comet nuclear magnitude (M2): 12.3
- Apparent magnitude: 17.1 (2011 apparition)

P/2011 P1 (McNaught) was a Jupiter-family comet that passed extremely close to Jupiter on 4 December 2010 and disintegrated by 2012.

== Observational history ==
It was discovered on 1 August 2011 by astronomer Robert H. McNaught at the Siding Spring Observatory in New South Wales, Australia. With an observation arc of 415 days, the comet's nominal orbit solution suggests that its 2010 approach distance was 0.00084 AU (126,000 km; 78,000 mi) from Jupiter's center—well within Jupiter's Roche limit at which the comet would be torn apart by tidal forces. The earliest precovery image of the comet was taken by Pan-STARRS 1 on 6 December 2010, two days after the comet's close pass with Jupiter.

== See also ==
- Comet Shoemaker–Levy 9
