= Duncan Steel =

British space scientist

Duncan I. Steel
- Born: 1955 (age 70–71)
- Education: University of London (BSc, 1977); Queen Mary College (1978); Imperial College of Science and Technology (MSc, DIC, 1979); University of Canterbury (PhD, 1985)
- Scientific career
- Fields: Space science

Duncan I. Steel (born 1955) is a British space scientist. He has discovered several minor planets and has written four popular science books. He is a member of the International Astronomical Union, and has worked at the Xerra Earth Observation Institute in Nelson, in the South Island of New Zealand. He was formerly on the staff of the University of Salford in the United Kingdom. Steel completed a PhD at the University of Canterbury in 1984 with a thesis on the orbital characteristics of meteoroids.

Between 1990 and 1994 he discovered twelve numbered minor planets. The asteroid 4713 Steel, discovered by Robert McNaught in 1989, is named after him.

In August 2022 Steel pleaded guilty to burglary and breaching the New Zealand Harmful Digital Communications Act. He was sentenced to 12 months' house arrest and ordered to pay $3000 in reparation for emotional harm.

Minor planets discovered: 12
5263 Arrius	13 April 1991
6828 Elbsteel	12 November 1990
9038 Helensteel	12 November 1990
9193 Geoffreycopland	10 March 1992
9758 Dainty	13 April 1991
9767 Midsomer Norton	10 March 1992
10107 Kenny	27 March 1992
16578 Essjayess	29 March 1992
24734 Kareness	10 March 1992
55815 Melindakim	31 December 1994
58196 Ashleyess	10 March 1992
69311 Russ	21 August 1992

== Books ==
- Rogue Asteroids and Doomsday Comets: The Search for the Million Megaton Menace That Threatens Life on Earth. New York: Wiley. 1995. ISBN 0-471-30824-2. (with a foreword by Arthur C. Clarke).
- Target earth. Pleasantville, N.Y.: Reader's Digest Association. 2000. ISBN 0-7621-0298-5. (with an afterword by Arthur C. Clarke).
- Marking Time: The Epic Quest to Invent the Perfect Calendar. New York: Wiley. 2000. ISBN 0-4712-9827-1.
- Eclipse: The Celestial Phenomenon That Changed the Course of History. Washington D.C.: Joseph Henry Press. 2001. ISBN 0-309-07438-X. (with a foreword by Paul Davies).
