= 4713 Steel =

Hungaria asteroid

Discovery
- Discovered by: R. H. McNaught
- Discovery site: Siding Spring Obs.
- Discovery date: 26 August 1989

Designations
- Named after: Duncan Steel (New Zealand astronomer)
- Alternative designations: 1989 QL
- Minor planet category: main-belt · Hungaria

Orbital characteristics
- Epoch 4 September 2017 (JD 2458000.5)
- Uncertainty parameter 0
- Observation arc: 40.28 yr (14,713 days)
- Aphelion: 2.0683 AU
- Perihelion: 1.7842 AU
- Semi-major axis: 1.9263 AU
- Eccentricity: 0.0737
- Orbital period (sidereal): 2.67 yr (977 days)
- Mean anomaly: 236.36°
- Mean motion: 0° 22^{m} 7.32^{s} / day
- Inclination: 22.671°
- Longitude of ascending node: 101.43°
- Argument of perihelion: 152.56°

Physical characteristics
- Dimensions: 5.62±0.53 km 6.248±0.011 km 6.286±0.055 km 7.51 km (calculated)
- Synodic rotation period: 5.186±0.004 h 5.193±0.002 h 5.199±0.002 h 5.203±0.002 h
- Geometric albedo: 0.18 (assumed); 0.3468±0.0386; 0.381±0.036; 0.424±0.082
- Spectral type: SMASS = A · A
- Absolute magnitude (H): 12.8 · 13.1 · 13.18±0.25

4713 Steel, provisional designation 1989 QL, is a rare-type Hungaria asteroid from the inner regions of the asteroid belt, approximately 6 kilometers in diameter. It was discovered on 26 August 1989, by Scottish–Australian astronomer Robert McNaught at the Siding Spring Observatory in New South Wales, Australia. It was named after astronomer Duncan Steel.

== Classification and orbit ==
The rare and reddish A-type asteroid is a member of the Hungaria family, which form the innermost dense concentration of asteroids in the Solar System. It orbits the Sun in the inner main-belt at a distance of 1.8–2.1 AU once every 2 years and 8 months (977 days). Its orbit has an eccentricity of 0.07 and an inclination of 23° with respect to the ecliptic.

A first precovery was taken at the discovering observatory in 1976, extending the asteroid's observation arc by 13 years prior to its official discovery observation in 1989.

== Lightcurves ==
In May 2005, the first rotational lightcurve was obtained for this asteroid from photometric observations made by French amateur astronomer Laurent Bernasconi. It gave a rotation period of 5.186±0.004 hours with a brightness variation of 0.44 magnitude (U=3).

Between May 2010 and December 2014, American astronomer Brian D. Warner obtained another 3 well-defined lightcurves at the U.S. Palmer Divide Station, Colorado. They gave a slightly longer period of 5.193–5.203 hours with an amplitude of 0.28 to 0.42 magnitude (U=3/3/3).

== Diameter and albedo ==
According to the survey carried out by the Japanese Akari satellite, the asteroid measures 5.6 kilometers in diameter and its surface has a high albedo of 0.424, while NASA's Wide-field Infrared Survey Explorer with its subsequent NEOWISE mission determined a diameter of 6.2 and 6.3 kilometers with an albedo of 0.347 and 0.381, respectively. The Collaborative Asteroid Lightcurve Link assumes a much lower albedo of 0.18 and calculates a larger diameter of 7.5 kilometers with an absolute magnitude of 13.1.

== Naming ==
This minor planet was named for English-born New Zealander Duncan Steel (born 1955), astronomer and discoverer of minor planets, whose research focuses on small Solar System bodies, such as the dynamics of asteroids, comets and meteoroids, and on meteoric impact rates. He has also demonstrated that various asteroids of the Apollo group are the parents of meteor showers. The approved naming citation was published by the Minor Planet Center on 30 March 1991 (M.P.C. 17982).
