= 6708 Bobbievaile =

Main-belt asteroid binary

Discovery
- Discovered by: R. H. McNaught
- Discovery site: Siding Spring Obs.
- Discovery date: 4 January 1989

Designations
- Named after: Bobbie Vaile (astrophysicist)
- Alternative designations: 1989 AA_{5} · 1979 PF; 1989 CM_{9} · 1994 LB
- Minor planet category: main-belt · (inner) background

Orbital characteristics
- Epoch 4 September 2017 (JD 2458000.5)
- Uncertainty parameter 0
- Observation arc: 37.81 yr (13,811 days)
- Aphelion: 2.8864 AU
- Perihelion: 2.0045 AU
- Semi-major axis: 2.4455 AU
- Eccentricity: 0.1803
- Orbital period (sidereal): 3.82 yr (1,397 days)
- Mean anomaly: 349.25°
- Mean motion: 0° 15^{m} 27.72^{s} / day
- Inclination: 12.076°
- Longitude of ascending node: 115.81°
- Argument of perihelion: 193.50°
- Known satellites: 1 (period: 24.7 h)

Physical characteristics
- Dimensions: 8.074±0.176 km
- Synodic rotation period: 12.3415±0.0004 h
- Geometric albedo: 0.169±0.016
- Spectral type: S
- Absolute magnitude (H): 13.1

6708 Bobbievaile, provisional designation 1989 AA_{5}, is a stony background asteroid and asynchronous binary system from the inner regions of the asteroid belt, approximately 8 kilometers (5 miles) in diameter. It was discovered on 4 January 1989, by Australian astronomer Robert McNaught at the Siding Spring Observatory in New South Wales, Australia. It is named after Bobbie Vaile.

== Orbit and classification ==
Bobbievaile is a stony, non-family asteroid from the main belt's background population. It orbits the Sun in the inner main-belt at a distance of 2.0–2.9 AU once every 3 years and 10 months (1,397 days). Its orbit has an eccentricity of 0.18 and an inclination of 12° with respect to the ecliptic.

It was first observed as 1979 PF at El Leoncito in 1979, extending the body's observation arc by 10 years prior to its official discovery observation at Siding Spring.

== Binary asteroid ==
On 7 May 2009, it was announced that Bobbievaile was determined to be a binary asteroid based on a series of lightcurve observations. Bobbievaile (the primary) is estimated to have a diameter of 8.02±0.02 km, and its minor-planet moon (the secondary) to have a diameter of approximately 4.57 km. The primary is probably spherical.

== Naming ==
This minor planet was named in memory of Australian astrophysicist Roberta Anne "Bobbie" Vaile (1959–1996), lecturer at Western Sydney University. She was a SETI enthusiast and participated in both the establishment of the SETI Australia Centre and the conduction of Project Phoenix. The official naming citation was published by the Minor Planet Center on 22 April 1997 (M.P.C. 29671).
