= (7474) 1992 TC =

Large asteroid

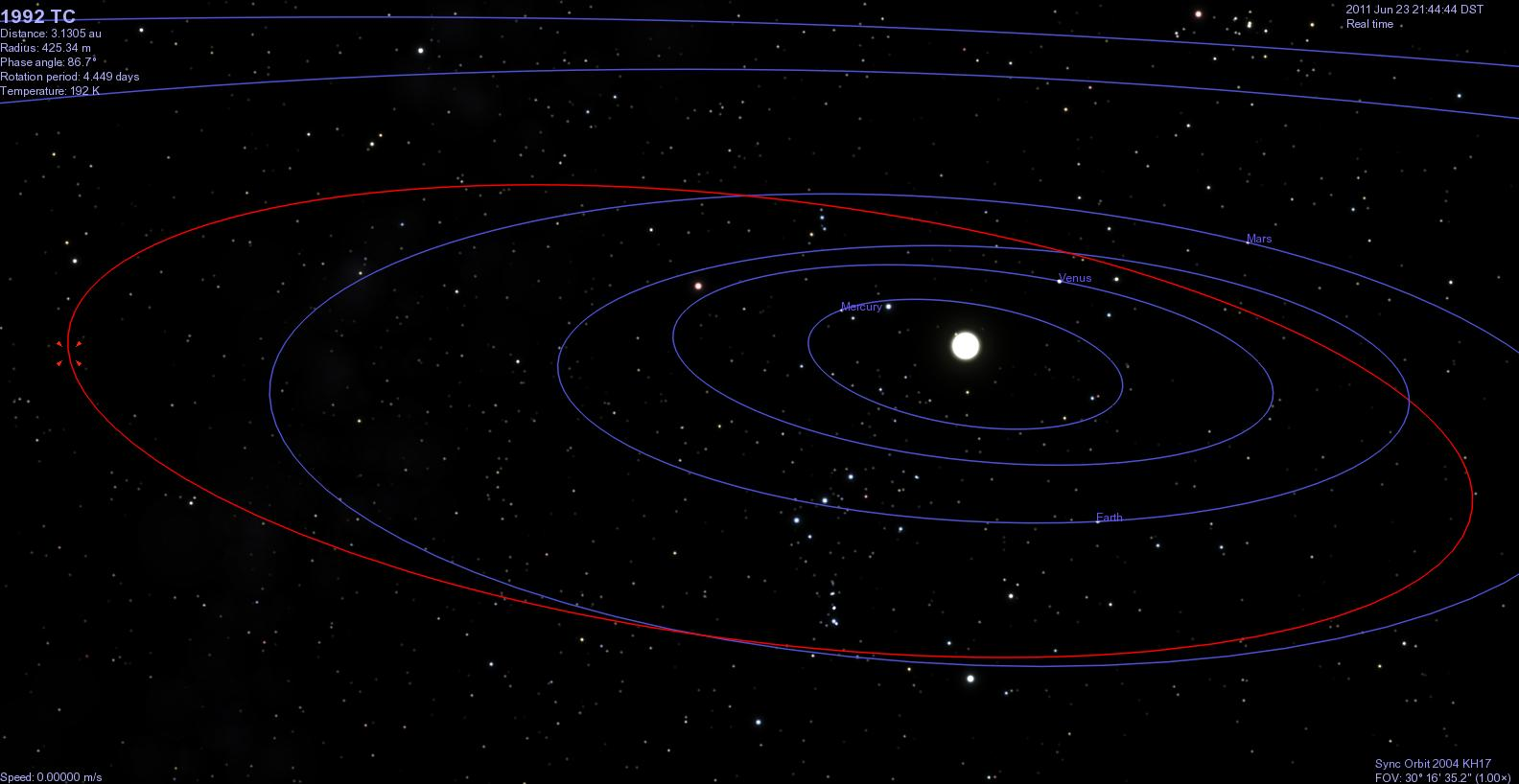

Discovery
- Discovered by: McNaught, R. H.
- Discovery site: Siding Spring
- Discovery date: 1 October 1992

Orbital characteristics
- Epoch 13 January 2016 (JD 2457400.5)
- Uncertainty parameter 0
- Observation arc: 9008 days (24.66 yr)
- Aphelion: 2.023428544361125 AU (302.70060175002 Gm)
- Perihelion: 1.107744504781589 AU (165.71621919495 Gm)
- Semi-major axis: 1.565586524571357 AU (234.20841047248 Gm)
- Eccentricity: 0.2924412113952760
- Orbital period (sidereal): 1.96 yr (715.51 d)
- Mean anomaly: 319.6698827668740°
- Mean motion: 0° 30^{m} 11.302^{s} / day
- Inclination: 7.087399865368700°
- Longitude of ascending node: 88.65316330200990°
- Argument of perihelion: 275.5510819132080°
- Earth MOID: 0.166416 AU (24.8955 Gm)

Physical characteristics
- Mean diameter: 670–1500 meters
- Synodic rotation period: 5.540 h (0.2308 d)
- Spectral type: X
- Absolute magnitude (H): 18.0

(7474) 1992 TC is a large sized M-type asteroid discovered by Robert H. McNaught in 1992. It is notably one of a few similar M-type asteroids, including the named asteroids 4660 Nereus and 65803 Didymos, which can be reached easily by spacecraft from Earth. The delta-V required to reach 1992 TC would be about 5.6 kilometres per second (3.5 mi/s), which is less than is needed to reach the Moon. M-type asteroids are thought to be composed primarily of nickel and iron, which if proven to be true means that 1992 TC may one day become an important source of raw materials in space.

With an absolute magnitude of 18.0, the asteroid is about 670–1500 meters in diameter. On 2031-Aug-11 the asteroid will pass 0.085 AU (12,700,000 km; 7,900,000 mi) from Mars.
