= (7888) 1993 UC =

Near-Earth asteroid

Discovery
- Discovered by: Robert H. McNaught
- Discovery date: 20 October 1993

Designations
- Minor planet category: Apollo; NEO

Orbital characteristics
- Epoch 13 January 2016 (JD 2457400.5)
- Uncertainty parameter 0
- Observation arc: 9456 days (25.89 yr)
- Aphelion: 4.0540 AU (606.47 Gm) (Q)
- Perihelion: 0.81827 AU (122.411 Gm) (q)
- Semi-major axis: 2.4361 AU (364.44 Gm) (a)
- Eccentricity: 0.66411 (e)
- Orbital period (sidereal): 3.80 yr (1388.8 d)
- Mean anomaly: 274.28°
- Mean motion: 0° 15^{m} 33.156^{s} / day
- Inclination: 26.082°
- Longitude of ascending node: 165.92°
- Argument of perihelion: 323.07°
- Earth MOID: 0.0889665 AU (13.30920 Gm)

Physical characteristics
- Mean diameter: ~2.7 km (1.7 mi)
- Equatorial escape velocity: ~1.3 m/s (3 mph)
- Synodic rotation period: 2.340 h (0.0975 d)
- Spectral type: U
- Apparent magnitude: 14.1 (2013 peak)
- Absolute magnitude (H): 15.1

(7888) 1993 UC is a near-Earth minor planet in the Apollo group. It was discovered by Robert H. McNaught at the Siding Spring Observatory in Coonabarabran, New South Wales, Australia, on 20 October 1993. The asteroid has an observation arc of 34 years and has a well determined orbit. Its estimated size is 2.3 to 5.2 km.

On 20 March 2013, the asteroid passed 49 lunar distances or 0.12598 AU (18,846,000 km; 11,711,000 mi) from Earth at a relative velocity of 21.8 km/s (49,000 mph). The approach posed no threat to Earth. (7888) 1993 UC is not classified as a potentially hazardous asteroid (PHA) because its Earth MOID (Minimum Orbit Intersection Distance) is only 0.084 AU, and only objects with an Earth MOID less than 0.05 AU are considered PHAs.

It was discovered to be a binary asteroid by Arecibo Observatory in March 2013.
