= 220P/McNaught =

Jupiter-family comet

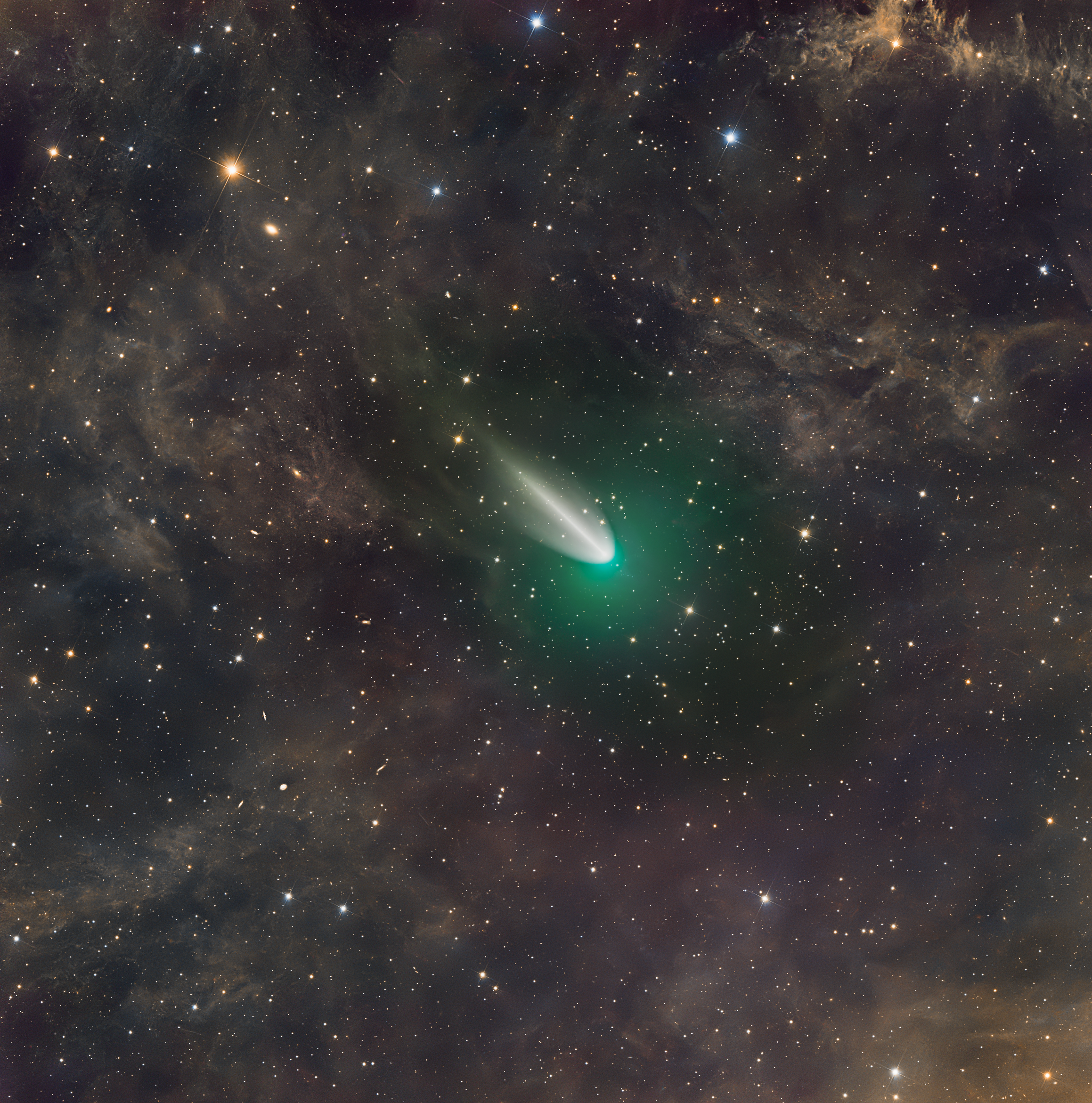
- 220P/McNaught in a heavy IFN area. Captured on 12 August 2026, seven days after the second outburst.

Discovery
- Discovered by: Robert H. McNaught
- Discovery site: Siding Spring Observatory
- Discovery date: 20 May 2004

Designations
- MPC designation: P/2004 K2, P/2009 H2
- Alternative designations: McNaught 1

Orbital characteristics
- Epoch: 21 November 2025 (JD 2461000.5)
- Observation arc: 22.25 years (Note: Observation arc from the Minor Planet Center database covering dates from 20 May 2004 until 21 August 2026.)
- Number of observations: 1,599
- Aphelion: 4.68 AU
- Perihelion: 1.559 AU
- Semi-major axis: 3.12 AU
- Eccentricity: 0.50036
- Orbital period: 5.51 years
- Inclination: 8.1206°
- Longitude of ascending node: 150.09°
- Argument of periapsis: 180.57°
- Mean anomaly: 323.3°
- Last perihelion: 14 June 2026
- Next perihelion: 18 December 2031
- T_{Jupiter}: 2.996
- Earth MOID: 0.540 AU (80.8 million km)
- Jupiter MOID: 0.712 AU (106.5 million km)

Physical characteristics
- Mean radius: <1.315 km (0.817 mi)
- Mass: 7.0×10^{12} kg
- Mean density: 500 kg/m^{3}
- Spectral type: (B–V) = 0.62±0.02; (V–R) = 0.32±0.01; (V–I) = 0.73±0.01
- Comet total magnitude (M1): 15.3±0.7
- Comet nuclear magnitude (M2): 17.9±0.5

220P/McNaught, is a Jupiter-family comet with a 5.5-year orbit around the Sun. It is one of several comets discovered by Australian astronomer, Robert H. McNaught. It reached perihelion on 14 June 2026, two weeks after a large outburst in which the comet brightened as much as 8,000 times. In August 2026 there was a second outburst brightening by a factor of about 600.

== Discovery ==
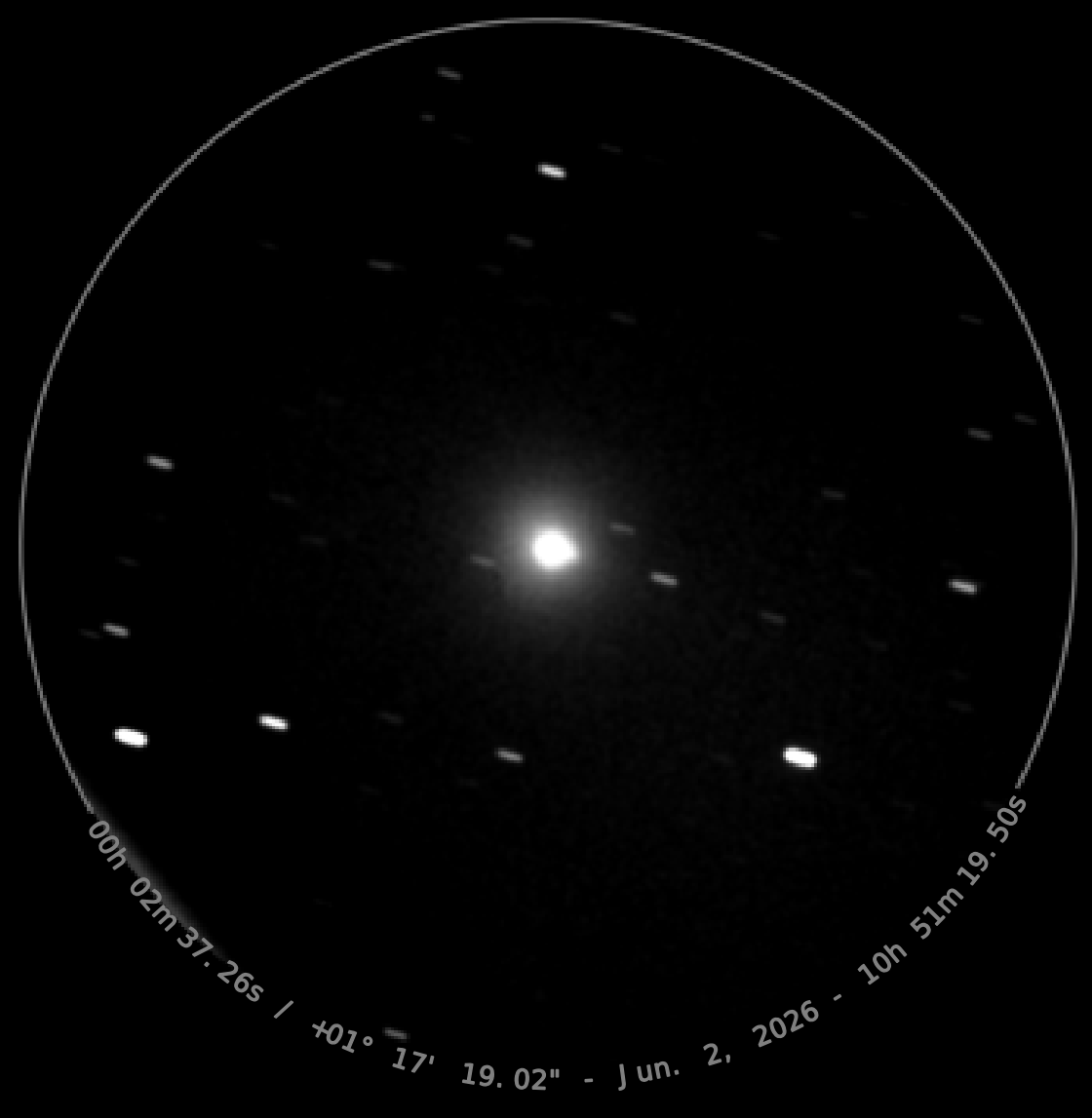
220P/McNaught imaged with a Unistellar smart telescope on 2 June 2026, near the time of the first outburst.

Robert McNaught discovered the comet in images obtained by the Uppsala Southern Schmidt Telescope in Siding Spring Observatory, Australia, on 20 May 2004. The comet in the CCD images had an estimated magnitude of 17.7. The discovery of the comet was confirmed by J. Young at Table Mountain Observatory on May 25. The comet had a coma 8–10 arcseconds across without central concentration and a narrow tail 20 to 30 arcseconds long.

The comet was recovered by Spacewatch on 28 April 2009 and independently by G. Muler, J. M. Ruiz and R. Naves with the 0.30-m Schmidt-Cassegrain telescope at the Nazaret Observatory on May 1. The comet had an apparent magnitude of 20.2. The comet appeared stellar in the single 120s exposure by Spacewatch. Afterwards, the comet was given the permanent number 220P.

== 2026 outbursts ==
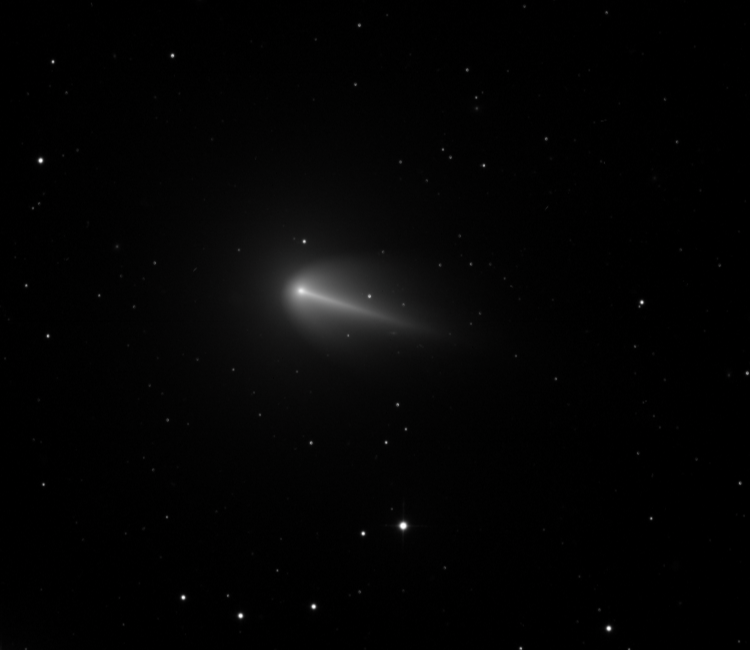
Image of 220P/McNaught through Slooh, five days after the second outburst.

On 1 June 2026, Mike Kelley reported on the comet mailing list that 220P/McNaught had undergone a large outburst. Using data from the Zwicky Transient Facility, he noted the comet brightened by about 7 magnitudes (from roughly magnitude 18 to 11), more than a 600-fold increase in brightness. The outburst occurred within a 13 hours and 32 minutes window between May 30 at 14:05 and May 31 at 03:37 UTC. Other observations reported the comet reached a peak magnitude of 8.2, which would represent up to an 8,000-fold increase in brightness. The comet on June 3 had a coma 6.5 arcminutes across and a tail about 2 arcminutes long, while deeper exposures revealed a fain ion tail about two degrees long on June 2. Visually, the coma was about 3 arcminutes across despite bright moonlight. Follow-up measurements from the TRAPPIST-North Telescope (Z53) noted a significant drop in dust production rate after the outburst, which appeared to be enriched in C_{2} in relation to CN, likely indicating that a fragmentation event has occurred. By mid-June the comet had faded to about magnitude 12. On 5 August 2026 the comet outburst a second time by a factor of about 600 surging from magnitude 14 to magnitude 7.

For comparison, in 2007, Comet 17P/Holmes brightened as much as a million-fold, jumping from magnitude 17 to about magnitude 2.8.

Notable Comet Outbursts
Comet	Date	Distance from Sun	Change in magnitude and brightness
220P/McNaught	2026-05-30	1.6 AU	9.5 magnitudes (7000x)
17P/Holmes	2007-10-23	2.4 AU	14.2 magnitudes (500000x)
41P/Tuttle–Giacobini–Kresák	1973-05-26	3.9 AU	10 magnitudes (10000x)
289P/Blanpain	2013-07-04	3.9 AU	9 magnitudes (4000x)
29P/Schwassmann–Wachmann	10/year	6.0 AU	3 magnitudes (20x)

These outbursts are caused by the sudden release of heated gases breaking through the crust and creating a massive dust plume that significantly increases the coma's column density and surface area.

== Orbit ==
The comet takes 5.5 years to orbit the Sun. It has an Earth–Minimum orbit intersection distance (E–MOID) of 0.54 AU (81 million km) and on 20 August 2048 will pass 0.598 AU (89.5 million km) from Earth. Several close approaches to Jupiter between 1956 and 2170 are expected, the closest of which (0.62 AU) will occur in 2063.

== Notes ==
Numbered comets
Previous; 219P/LINEAR	220P/McNaught	Next; 221P/LINEAR
