= (480808) 1994 XL1 =

Sub-kilometer asteroid

(480808) 1994 XL_{1}
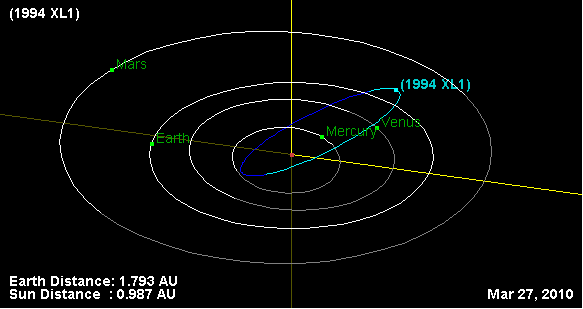

Discovery
- Discovered by: R. H. McNaught
- Discovery site: Siding Spring Obs.
- Discovery date: 6 December 1994

Designations
- Minor planet category: NEO · Aten · PHA

Orbital characteristics
- Epoch 30 January 2013 (JD 2456322.5)
- Uncertainty parameter 0
- Observation arc: 21.99 yr (8,033 days)
- Aphelion: 1.0240 AU
- Perihelion: 0.3178 AU
- Semi-major axis: 0.6709 AU
- Eccentricity: 0.5263
- Orbital period (sidereal): 0.55 yr (201 days)
- Mean anomaly: 205.64°
- Mean motion: 1° 47^{m} 36.96^{s} / day
- Inclination: 28.167°
- Longitude of ascending node: 252.68°
- Argument of perihelion: 356.54°
- Earth MOID: 0.0365 AU · 14.2 LD

Physical characteristics
- Mean diameter: 0.2 km (est. at 0.20)
- Absolute magnitude (H): 20.9

(480808) 1994 XL_{1} is a sub-kilometer asteroid, classified as near-Earth object and potentially hazardous asteroid of the Aten group, approximately 200 meters (700 feet) in diameter. It was discovered on 6 December 1994, by Scottish–Australian astronomer Robert McNaught at Siding Spring Observatory in Australia. It was one of the first asteroids discovered to have a semi-major axis less than Venus.

== Orbit and classification ==
1994 XL_{1} orbits the Sun at a distance of 0.3–1.0 AU once every 0 years and 7 months (201 days). Its orbit has an eccentricity of 0.53 and an inclination of 28° with respect to the ecliptic. No precoveries were taken, and no prior identifications were made. The body's observation arc begins with its official discovery observation.

=== Close encounter ===
The asteroid has an Earth minimum orbital intersection distance of 0.0365 AU (5,460,000 km), which translates into 14.2 lunar distances. It passed 0.03709 AU (5,550,000 km) from Earth on 6 December 1994. On 4 December 2044, it will pass again at 0.03637 AU (5,440,000 km) from Earth.

== Physical characteristics ==
1994 XL_{1} has not been observed by any of the space-based surveys such as the Infrared Astronomical Satellite IRAS, the Japanese Akari satellite, and NASA's Wide-field Infrared Survey Explorer with its subsequent NEOWISE mission. Based on a generic magnitude-to-diameter conversion, 1994 XL_{1} measures approximately 0.2 kilometers in diameter assuming an albedo of 0.20, which is a typical value for stony S-type asteroids.

As of 2017, no rotational lightcurve of this object has been obtained. The body's rotation period, shape and poles remain unknown.

== Naming and numbering ==
After its first observation in 1994, this minor planet was numbered 23 years later by the Minor Planet Center on 12 January 2017 (M.P.C. 112958), after its last observation with the LCO–A 1-meter global telescope station at Sutherland, South Africa, on 6 December 2016 (K91). As of 2018, the asteroid has not been named .
