= C/2007 Q3 (Siding Spring) =

Oort cloud comet

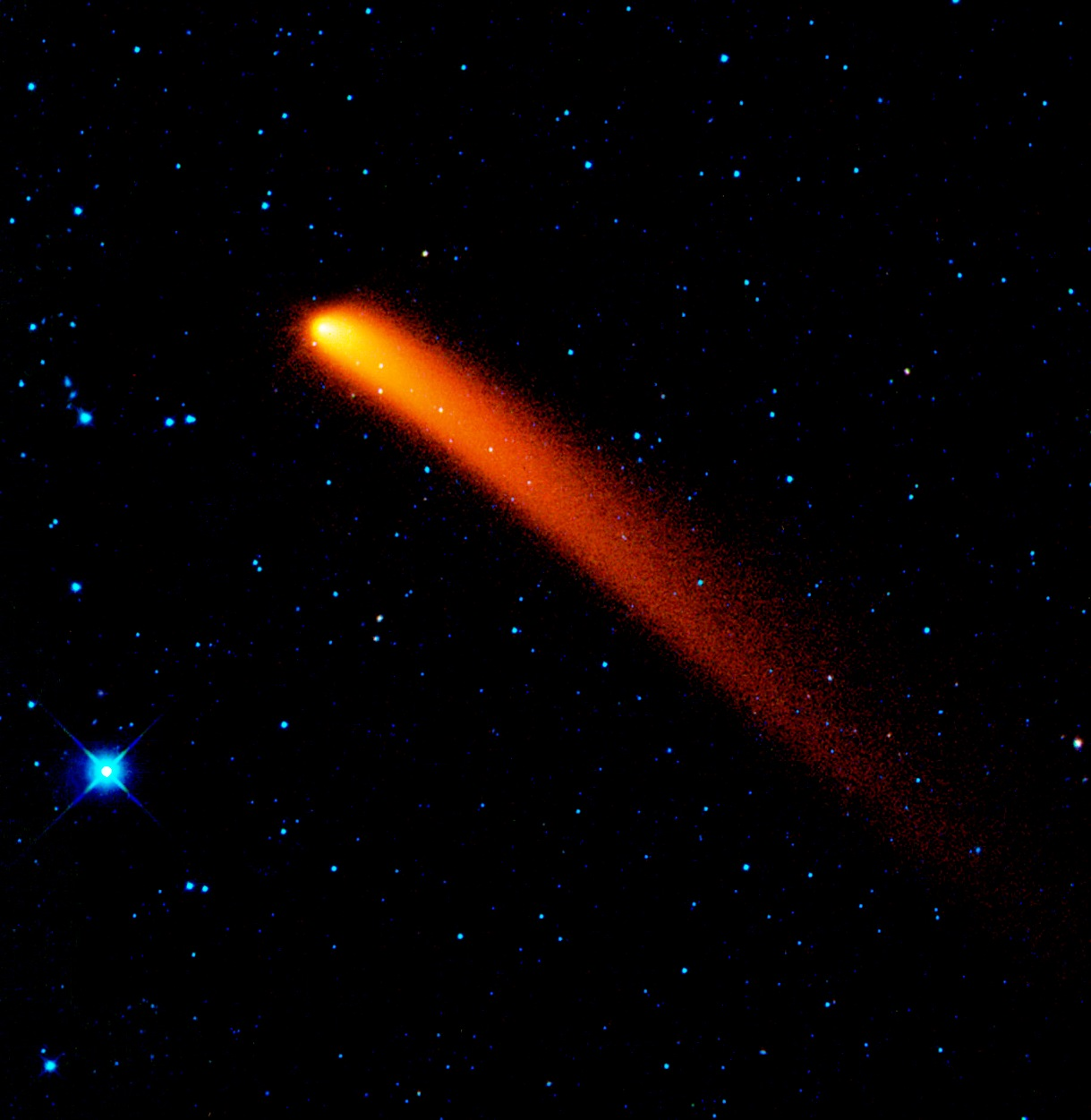
- Infrared image of C/2007 Q3 (Siding Spring) taken by WISE on 10 January 2010

Discovery
- Discovered by: Donna M. Burton
- Discovery site: Siding Spring, Australia; 0.5-m Schmidt (E12)
- Discovery date: 25 August 2007

Orbital characteristics
- Epoch: 20 August 2009 (JD 2455063.5)
- Observation arc: 4.02 years (1,470 days)
- Number of observations: 1,333
- Orbit type: Oort cloud
- Aphelion: ~69,000 AU (inbound); ~15,000 AU (outbound)
- Perihelion: 2.252 AU
- Semi-major axis: ~7,500 AU (outbound)
- Eccentricity: 1.0002077
- Orbital period: 6.4 million years (inbound); ~650,000 years (outbound)
- Inclination: 65.650°
- Longitude of ascending node: 149.41°
- Argument of periapsis: 2.093°
- Last perihelion: 7 October 2009
- T_{Jupiter}: 0.767
- Earth MOID: 1.262 AU
- Jupiter MOID: 3.129 AU

Physical characteristics
- Comet total magnitude (M1): 8.6
- Apparent magnitude: 8.7 (2009 apparition)

C/2007 Q3 (Siding Spring), is an Oort cloud comet that was discovered by Donna Burton in 2007 at Siding Spring Observatory in New South Wales, Australia. Siding Spring came within 1.2 AU (180 million km) of Earth and 2.25 AU (337 million km) of the Sun on October 7, 2009. The comet was visible with binoculars until January 2010.

== Observations and orbit ==
Images of the comet taken in March 2010 by N. Howes using the Faulkes telescope, showed that the nucleus had fragmented.

The comet has an observation arc of 1,333 days and was continuously observed until September 2011. The orbit of a long-period comet is properly obtained when the osculating orbit is computed at an epoch after leaving the planetary region and is calculated with respect to the center of mass of the Solar System. Using JPL Horizons, the barycentric orbital elements for epoch 2030-Jan-01 generate a semi-major axis of 7,500 AU (0.119 ly), an apoapsis distance of 15,000 AU (0.24 ly), and a period of approximately 650,000 years.

Before entering the planetary region (epoch 1950), C/2007 Q3 had a calculated barycentric orbital period of ~6.4 million years with an apoapsis (aphelion) distance of about 69,000 AU (1.09 ly). The comet was probably in the outer Oort cloud for millions or billions of years with a loosely bound chaotic orbit until it was perturbed inward.
