= LZI =

LZI may refer to:

- Leibniz-Zentrum für Informatik
- Zeppelin LZ1 - an Imperial German rigid dirigeable airship
- Led Zeppelin I – a 1969 album by Led Zeppelin.
- Landing Zone 1, SpaceX rocket landing pad in Space Coast, Florida, USA

== See also ==
- LZ1 (disambiguation)
