= (5604) 1992 FE =

Asteroid

Discovery
- Discovered by: R. H. McNaught
- Discovery site: Siding Spring Obs.
- Discovery date: 26 March 1992

Designations
- Minor planet category: NEO · Aten · PHA

Orbital characteristics
- Epoch 4 September 2017 (JD 2458000.5)
- Uncertainty parameter 0
- Observation arc: 32.11 yr (11,729 days)
- Aphelion: 1.3060 AU
- Perihelion: 0.5516 AU
- Semi-major axis: 0.9288 AU
- Eccentricity: 0.4061
- Orbital period (sidereal): 0.90 yr (327 days)
- Mean anomaly: 286.36°
- Mean motion: 1° 6^{m} 3.96^{s} / day
- Inclination: 4.7136°
- Longitude of ascending node: 311.96°
- Argument of perihelion: 82.586°
- Earth MOID: 0.0332 AU · 12.9 LD
- Venus MOID: 0.0059 AU

Physical characteristics
- Mean diameter: 550 meters (1,800 ft)
- Synodic rotation period: 5.3375 h (0.22240 d)
- Geometric albedo: 0.48
- Absolute magnitude (H): 17.1

(5604) 1992 FE is an Aten-type near-Earth minor planet. It was discovered by Robert H. McNaught at the Siding Spring Observatory in Canberra, Australia, on 26 March 1992. The asteroid is 550 meters (1,800 ft) in diameter.

The asteroid has a Venus minimum orbit intersection distance (Venus–MOID) of 0.0059 AU (880,000 km; 550,000 mi). On 7 April 2015 the asteroid passed 0.00717 AU (1,073,000 km; 666,000 mi) from Venus.

== See also ==
- (10115) 1992 SK
