= YZ Reticuli =

2020 Nova in the constellation Reticulum

- Location of YZ Reticuli (circled)

Observation data Epoch J2000.0 Equinox ICRS
- Constellation: Reticulum
- Right ascension: 03^{h} 58^{m} 29.55^{s}
- Declination: −54° 46′ 41.2″
- Apparent magnitude (V): 3.7 - 18.0

Characteristics
- Variable type: Nova (sdB?/DA?)

Astrometry
| Proper motion (μ) | RA: 7.244 mas/yr Dec.: 2.984 mas/yr |
| Parallax (π) | 0.3161±0.0464 mas |
| Distance | 2703+365 −293 pc |

Details
| Rotation | 37.69131±0.00001 seconds |

Other designations
- MGAB-V207, YZ Ret, 2MASS J03582954-5446411, Gaia DR2 4731746232846281344

Database references
| SIMBAD | data |

YZ Reticuli, also known as Nova Reticuli 2020, was a naked eye nova in the constellation Reticulum discovered on July 15, 2020. Previously it was known as a VY Sculptoris type object with the designation MGAB-V207.

== VY Sculptoris type ==
The variability of the object was first discovered by an amateur astronomer, Gabriel Murawski, and reported on August 6, 2019 with the name MGAB-V207. Archive photometry data from the Catalina Real-time Transient Survey and ASAS-SN showed nova-like (NL) brightness variations between magnitudes 15.8 and 17.0, exhibiting a deep dimming event in late 2006. The spectrum shows a hot subdwarf (sdB) or a white dwarf origin, which is consistent with VY Scl type objects.

== Nova eruption ==
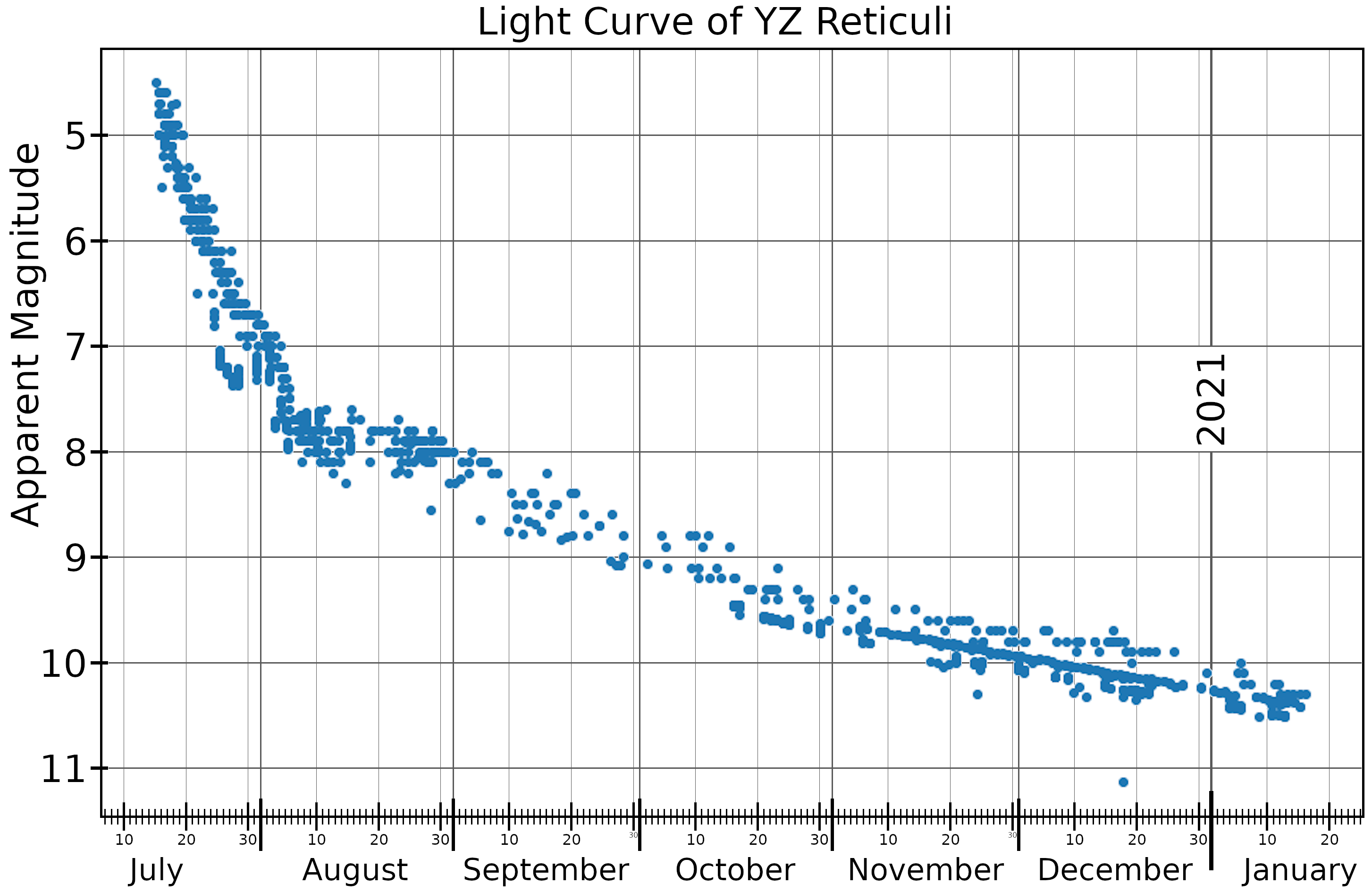
The light curve of YZ Reticuli plotted from AAVSO data

On July 15, 2020 Robert H. McNaught discovered a bright transient (magnitude 5.3) coincident with the position of MGAB-V207 and it was spectroscopically confirmed by the Southern African Large Telescope (SALT) as a classical nova on July 16. The spectrum includes Balmer, OI and FeII emission lines with P Cygni profiles. Spectrum analysis from observations by the Advanced Technology Telescope revealed a similarity to Nova Sagittarii 1991, three days after maximum brightness. Pre-discovery images showed that the brightness peak happened on July 9, 2020 at magnitude 3.7. In the days after the discovery, the nova faded by 0.2-0.3 magnitudes per day. This is the third case when an already known cataclysmic variable has undergone a classical nova eruption, following V407 Cygni and V392 Persei.

The orbital period of YZ Reticuli is 0.1324539 days (3 hours, 10 minutes, and 44 seconds), but in the months following the eruption, the lightcurve also oscillated with periods of 0.1384 and 0.1339 days. These are likely related to the accretion disk and represent a similar phenomenon to superhumps.

== See also ==
- List of novae in the Milky Way galaxy
