= 2012 LZ1 =

Asteroid classified as a near-Earth object

2012 LZ_{1}
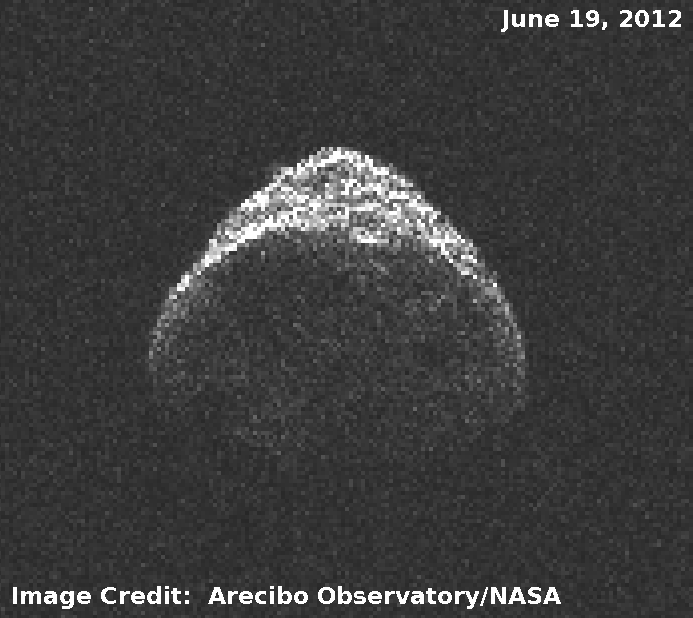
- Radar image of 2012 LZ_{1} by the Arecibo Observatory in 2012

Discovery
- Discovered by: Robert H. McNaught
- Discovery site: Siding Spring Survey
- Discovery date: 10 June 2012

Designations
- Minor planet category: Amor; NEO; PHA

Orbital characteristics
- Epoch 9 June 2026 (JD 2461200.5)
- Uncertainty parameter 0
- Aphelion: 4.0677 AU (608.52 Gm) (Q)
- Perihelion: 1.0530 AU (157.53 Gm) (q)
- Semi-major axis: 2.5603 AU (383.02 Gm) (a)
- Eccentricity: 0.58873 (e)
- Orbital period (sidereal): 4.0969 yr (1496.4 d)
- Mean anomaly: 148.168° (M)
- Mean motion: 0° 14^{m} 26.088^{s} / day (n)
- Inclination: 26.0679° (i)
- Longitude of ascending node: 264.497° (Ω)
- Argument of perihelion: 14.3562° (ω)
- Earth MOID: 0.048337 AU (7.2311 Gm)
- Jupiter MOID: 1.1344 AU (169.70 Gm)
- T_{Jupiter}: 3.051

Physical characteristics
- Dimensions: ~1 km
- Synodic rotation period: 12.87 h (0.536 d)
- Sidereal rotation period: 10–15 hr
- Geometric albedo: 0.02–0.04
- Absolute magnitude (H): 19.9

2012 LZ_{1} is an asteroid classified as a near-Earth object and potentially hazardous asteroid of the Amor group, approximately 1 km (0.62 mi) in diameter. It passed within 5.4 million kilometers (14 lunar distances) of Earth on 14 June 2012. It was discovered during the night of 10–11 June 2012 by astronomer Robert H. McNaught and his colleagues using the 0.5-meter Uppsala Southern Schmidt Telescope at the Siding Spring Observatory in Australia, just four days before its closest approach to Earth.

== Overview ==
Arecibo radar observations on 19 June 2012 have shown that 2012 LZ_{1} is about 1 kilometre (0.62 mi) in diameter and that 2012 LZ_{1} has zero chance of impacting the Earth for at least the next 750 years.

A small change of trajectory caused by Earth's gravity was predicted from the 2012 passby. The Slooh Space Camera streamed live footage of the passby over the Internet. McNaught and Astronomy magazine columnist Bob Berman hosted the broadcast. "We love it when stuff like this happens, because it's fun to do and the public appreciates it", said Slooh president Patrick Paolucci. The asteroid was the same brightness as a 13th-magnitude star, too faint to be seen by the naked eye or a low-end telescope.

The next passby for 2012 LZ_{1} was 27 July 2016 at 0.5 AU (75,000,000 km; 46,000,000 mi) from Earth.

== See also ==
- 2005 YU55, a near-Earth asteroid roughly half the size.
- Near-Earth Asteroid Tracking
