= (308242) 2005 GO21 =

Near-Earth asteroid

(308242) 2005 GO_{21}
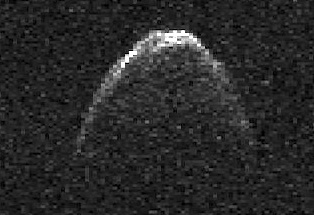
- Goldstone radar image of asteroid 2005 GO_{21} taken on 17 June 2012

Discovery
- Discovered by: Siding Spring Srvy.
- Discovery site: Siding Spring Obs.
- Discovery date: 1 April 2005

Designations
- Minor planet category: Aten · NEO · PHA

Orbital characteristics
- Epoch 13 January 2016 (JD 2457400.5)
- Uncertainty parameter 0
- Observation arc: 3385 days (9.27 yr)
- Aphelion: 1.0093 AU (150.99 Gm)
- Perihelion: 0.49720 AU (74.380 Gm)
- Semi-major axis: 0.75324 AU (112.683 Gm)
- Eccentricity: 0.33992
- Orbital period (sidereal): 0.65 yr (238.8 d)
- Mean anomaly: 19.462°
- Mean motion: 1.5077°/day
- Inclination: 24.926°
- Longitude of ascending node: 272.70°
- Argument of perihelion: 156.62°
- Earth MOID: 0.0452219 AU (6.76510 Gm)

Physical characteristics
- Mean diameter: ~1.6 km
- Synodic rotation period: 11.00 h
- Absolute magnitude (H): 16.5

(308242) 2005 GO_{21} is a large Aten near-Earth asteroid and potentially hazardous object. It has a well determined orbit with an observation arc of 7 years and an uncertainty parameter of 0. It was discovered on 1 April 2005 by the Siding Spring Survey at an apparent magnitude of 18.1 using the 0.5-metre (20 in) Uppsala Southern Schmidt Telescope.

Based on an absolute magnitude of 16.4, the asteroid has an estimated diameter of 1.6 km (within a factor of two). (308242) 2005 GO_{21} is the largest potentially hazardous asteroid (PHA) discovered in 2005. On 21 June 2012 it passed Earth at a distance of 0.043963 AU (6,576,800 km; 4,086,600 mi). The 2012 passage was studied with radar using Goldstone and Arecibo.
