= C/2009 R1 (McNaught) =

Hyperbolic comet

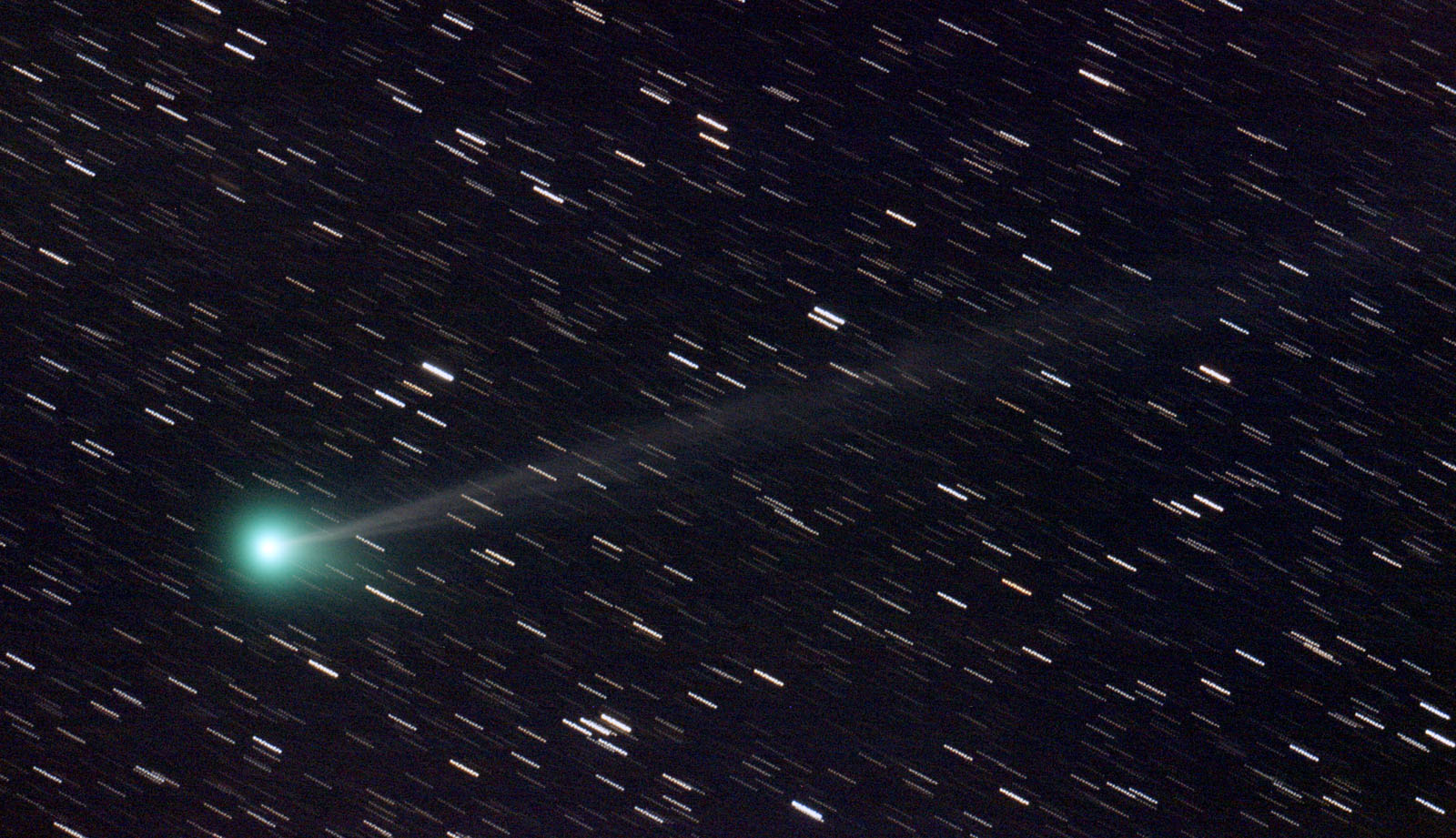
- C/2009 R1 (McNaught) photographed from Slovenia on 9 June 2010

Discovery
- Discovered by: Robert H. McNaught
- Discovery site: Siding Spring Observatory
- Discovery date: 9 September 2009

Designations
- Alternative designations: CK09R010

Orbital characteristics
- Epoch: 18 April 2013 (JD 2456400.5)
- Observation arc: 344 days
- Number of observations: 800
- Perihelion: 0.405 AU
- Eccentricity: 1.00041
- Inclination: 77.031°
- Longitude of ascending node: 322.62°
- Argument of periapsis: 130.69°
- Last perihelion: 2 July 2010
- Next perihelion: ejection
- Earth MOID: 0.446 AU
- Jupiter MOID: 1.221 AU

Physical characteristics
- Mean diameter: 8.83 ± 1.38 km (5.49 ± 0.86 mi)
- Comet total magnitude (M1): 9.9

C/2009 R1 (McNaught), one of more than fifty comets known as Comet McNaught, is a non-periodic comet discovered by British-Australian astronomer Robert H. McNaught on 9 September 2009, using the Uppsala Southern Schmidt Telescope at Siding Spring Observatory in New South Wales, Australia. The discovery was confirmed the same day at the Optical Ground Station telescope at Tenerife. After the discovery, earlier images of the comet were found from July 20, August 1, and August 18, 2009. It is believed that C/2009 R1 has left the Solar System permanently.

== Observational history ==
In early June 2010, C/2009 R1 was visible with binoculars in the constellations Andromeda and Perseus, and by June 8 it was visible to the unaided eye in a dark sky with little light pollution. Astronomers predicted the comet to grow brighter and become widely visible in the northern hemisphere to the unaided eye by mid- or late-June, at which time it appeared between the constellations Auriga and Gemini. Because the new moon on June 12 provided a particularly dark night sky, the weekend of Friday, June 11 to Sunday, June 13 was expected to be the best time to view the comet, and it was expected to be "an easy skywatching target for most people." Late the following week, the comet remained "easy to spot in binoculars".

Cometary brightness is difficult to predict, especially when, as in this case, it is the first known appearance of the comet. C/2009 R1 proved to be brighter than expected, so much so that Sky and Telescope retitled an online article from "Faint Comet in the June dawn" to "Comet in the June dawn". Predictions expected C/2009 R1 to eventually reach a brightness as high as magnitude 2 from June 30 to July 2, 2010, the latter date marking perihelion. However, as it grew brighter, its proximity to the Sun made it difficult to see, and would make it likely only visible near the horizon at dawn and dusk. The exception to this was the total solar eclipse on July 11 in the Southern Hemisphere (visible in the South Pacific, touching land at Mangaia, Easter Island, and far southern Chile and Argentina), which allowed the comet to be seen during the day. The comet was notable for its "impressive green coma and long ion tail", which spanned 5 degrees as of 6 June 2010, and its appearance was likened to an "apple on a stick." By June 13, a second tail created by dust from the comet, was also visible, sharing the same green hue of the coma. The green colors in the coma were caused by the presence of cyanogen and diatomic carbon, while bluish hues in the ion tail were produced by positively charged carbon monoxide and carbon dioxide ions.
