= 260P/McNaught =

Jupiter-family comet

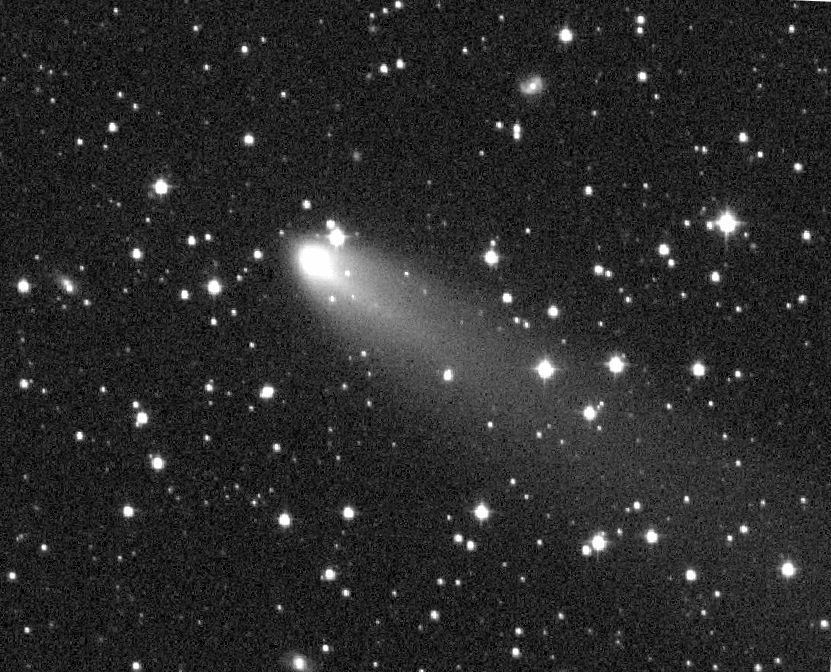
- Comet McNaught 4 photographed from the Zwicky Transient Facility on 3 October 2019

Discovery
- Discovered by: Robert H. McNaught
- Discovery site: Siding Spring Observatory
- Discovery date: 20 May 2005

Designations
- MPC designation: P/2005 K3, P/2012 K2
- Alternative designations: McNaught 4

Orbital characteristics
- Epoch: 9 June 2026 (JD 2461200.5)
- Observation arc: 21.27 years (Note: Observation arc from the Minor Planet Center database covering dates from 20 May 2005 until 25 August 2026.)
- Number of observations: 7,210
- Aphelion: 5.829 AU
- Perihelion: 1.418 AU
- Semi-major axis: 3.623 AU
- Eccentricity: 0.60865
- Orbital period: 6.897 years
- Inclination: 15.039°
- Longitude of ascending node: 349.27°
- Argument of periapsis: 18.514°
- Mean anomaly: 351.85°
- Last perihelion: 5 August 2026
- Next perihelion: 19 July 2033
- T_{Jupiter}: 2.717
- Earth MOID: 0.495 AU
- Jupiter MOID: 0.024 AU

Physical characteristics
- Mean radius: 1.54±0.09 km
- Mean density: 620±90 kg/m^{3}
- Synodic rotation period: 8.16±0.24 hours
- Comet total magnitude (M1): 12.7
- Comet nuclear magnitude (M2): 15.4

Comet McNaught 4, also known as 260P/McNaught, is a Jupiter-family comet with a 6.9-year orbit around the Sun. It is one of several comets discovered by Australian astronomer, Robert H. McNaught. It came to perihelion in August 2026 and will next come to perihelion in July 2033.

== Observational history ==
On 20 May 2005, Robert H. McNaught found his fourth periodic comet (P/2005 K3) from the 0.5 m (1.6 ft) telescope of the Siding Spring Observatory, where he reported it has a slightly diffuse head with a narrow tail about 30 arcseconds in length.

It was later rediscovered in 15–18 May 2012 from the Pierre Auger Observatory as P/2012 K2, which was later confirmed to be a recovery of comet McNaught 4 a few days later.

During its 2019 apparition, a small outburst had temporarily brightened the comet from magnitude 13.78 to 13.59.

== Physical characteristics ==
Photometric analysis of the comet between August 2012 and January 2013 has determined that its nucleus rotates at a single axis, completing one stable rotation once every 0.34 ± 0.01 days (8.16 ± 0.240 hours).

The nucleus itself has an effective radius of 1.54 ± 0.09 km (0.957 ± 0.056 mi). However, near-infrared observations from the Spitzer Space Telescope found a smaller effective radius at around 0.322±0.04 km, indicating that it may have an elongated shape.

== Notes ==
Numbered comets
Previous; 259P/Garradd	260P/McNaught	Next; 261P/Larson
