= 7604 Kridsadaporn =

Unusual Mars-crossing asteroid

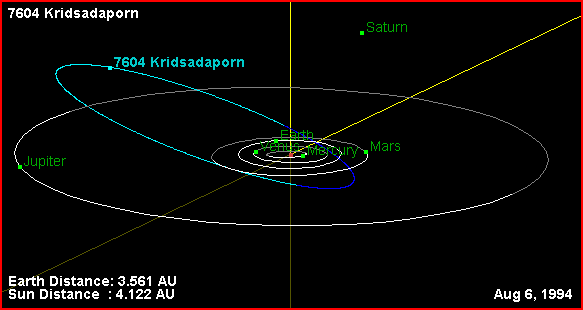
- Orbital diagram of Kridsadaporn

Discovery
- Discovered by: R. H. McNaught
- Discovery site: Siding Spring Obs.
- Discovery date: 31 August 1995

Designations
- Named after: Kridsadaporn Ritsmitchai (Thai astronomer)
- Alternative designations: 1995 QY_{2} · 1984 QD_{1} 1991 CF_{3}
- Minor planet category: Mars-crosser unusual · ACO

Orbital characteristics
- Epoch 27 April 2019 (JD 2458600.5)
- Uncertainty parameter 0
- Observation arc: 33.89 yr (12,379 d)
- Aphelion: 4.8989 AU
- Perihelion: 1.3266 AU
- Semi-major axis: 3.1127 AU
- Eccentricity: 0.5738
- Orbital period (sidereal): 5.49 yr (2,006 d)
- Mean anomaly: 85.061°
- Mean motion: 0° 10^{m} 46.2^{s} / day
- Inclination: 20.449°
- Longitude of ascending node: 147.24°
- Argument of perihelion: 266.26°
- Earth MOID: 0.522 AU (203 LD)
- T_{Jupiter}: 2.8590

Physical characteristics
- Mean diameter: 12 km (est. at 0.057)
- Spectral type: SMASS = C
- Absolute magnitude (H): 13.3

7604 Kridsadaporn, provisional designation 1995 QY_{2}, is an unusual, carbonaceous asteroid and Mars-crosser on a highly eccentric orbit from the outer regions of the asteroid belt, approximately 12 kilometers (7.5 miles) in diameter. It was discovered on 31 August 1995, by Australian astronomer Robert McNaught at Siding Spring Observatory near Coonabarabran, Australia. Due to its particular orbit, the C-type asteroid belongs to MPC's list of "other" unusual objects, and has been classified as an "asteroid in cometary orbit", or ACO. The asteroid was named in memory of Thai astronomer Kridsadaporn Ritsmitchai.

== Discovery and naming ==
Kridsadaporn was discovered using the 0.5-m Uppsala Schmidt Telescope, as part of the Siding Spring Survey, which itself is part of a broader network of Near-Earth object search programs. The then-unnamed asteroid was initially assigned the provisional designation 1995 QY_{2}. In April 2005 it was renamed by its discoverer (Robert McNaught) in honour of Kridsadaporn Ritsmitchai, a then recently deceased friend and colleague at the Research School of Astronomy and Astrophysics at the Australian National University, who worked and resided at Siding Spring Observatory. The official naming citation was published by the Minor Planet Center on 7 April 2005 (M.P.C. 53953).

== Context ==
An approximation known as the Tisserand criteria (T) is applied to cometary encounters with planets (such as Jupiter) and used to describe their orbital inter-relationship. Asteroidal-appearing bodies in elliptical orbits with Jovian Tisserand parameters T_{j} < 3 only began to appear in search programs in the mid-1980s – Kridsadaporn's Jovian Tisserand parameter is T_{j} = 2.858. Before this, the failure to identify these objects was used as an argument against the existence of extinct cometary nuclei. Over the past two decades, an increasing number of asteroids, based upon their orbital and physical characteristics, have been suggested as extinct or dormant comets candidates. It is now considered likely that within the asteroid population there exist a significant number of dormant or extinct comets.

More recently, Kridsadaporn has received closer attention after having been included in a number of studies relating to the analysis of spectral properties of asteroids in cometary orbits (ACOs); and, collisional activation processes, and the dynamic and physical properties of ACOs. The investigation of ACOs is considered important in the understanding of formation processes of cometary dust mantles and the end states of comets, so as to determine the population of Jupiter-family comets, and, to also understand the dynamical processes involved in the transport mechanism of asteroids from typical asteroidal orbits to cometary-like ones.

In earlier studies, ACOs have sometimes been referred to as cometary asteroids or comet-asteroid transition objects.

== Orbit ==
Kridsadaporn orbits the Sun at a distance of 1.3–4.9 AU once every 5 years and 6 months (2,006 days; semi-major axis of 3.11 AU). Its orbit has a high eccentricity of 0.57 and an inclination of 20° with respect to the ecliptic. Its elliptical orbit has similar orbital characteristics to those of the Jupiter-family comets which populate the Jovian Tisserand invariant range between 2 and 3, which supports the scenario that a significant number of asteroids in cometary orbits are extinct or dormant cometary candidates.

=== Mars-crossing orbit ===
Kridsadaporn is amongst another group of bodies [Mars-crossing (MC) and/or near-Earth object (NEO) populations] that may have originated from the main asteroid belt as fragments injected into a mean-motion resonance or secular resonance, developing increasingly higher orbital eccentricity over time resulting in the perihelion distance becoming smaller than the aphelion distances of the inner planets. At their birth, near-earth asteroids (NEAs) and MC orbits are in resonance, and when their orbital eccentricity becomes large enough, to the point that their orbits cross those of the inner planets, their orbits then become modified in a random-walk fashion. This results in a complex interplay between planetary encounters and resonances which may lead to a range of unexpected outcomes including cometary-type orbits; solar collisions; or, eventual ejection from the Solar System.

=== Orbital evolution ===
Detailed investigations into Kridsadaporn's dynamic evolution have been carried out by creating 15 "clone" orbits, integrated forward over a period of 12 million years, by changing the last digit of its orbital parameters. Nine (9) clones demonstrated moderate chaotic behavior jumping between the Jovian mean-motion resonances of 15:7, 9:4, and 11:5 with some orbits becoming Earth-crossers within the integration period. The remaining six (6) clones grew in orbital eccentricity until becoming Jupiter-crossers, and then, behaving as Jupiter-family comets, they were ejected from the Solar System over periods in the order of 10^{5} years.

There are several prominent dips in the distribution of asteroids in the main belt. These gaps are more sparingly populated with objects of higher orbital eccentricity. Known as Kirkwood gaps, these dips in distribution density correspond to the location of orbital resonances with Jupiter. Objects with eccentric orbits continue to increase in orbital eccentricity over longer time-scales to eventually break out of resonance due to close encounters with a major planet. Kridsadaporn, with a semi-major axis of 3.11 AU, corresponds to a very narrow gap associated with the 11:7 resonance within a series of weaker and less sculpted gaps.

== Physical characteristics ==
In the SMASS classification, Kridsadaporn is a common, carbonaceous C-type asteroid.

A number of studies included Kridsadaporn within a sample of asteroids in cometary orbits in order to understand the relationships in spectral characteristics between ACOs, the Jupiter-family comets, and the outer main belt asteroids. The only finding was that comets present neutral or red feature-less spectra. Earlier studies suggested that comets in all stages of evolution - active; dormant; and, dead - were very dark, often reddish, objects with spectra similar to D-type, P-type and C-type asteroids of the outer Solar System with probably carbonaceous dust containing reddish organic compounds controlling their colour and albedo characteristics.

== Origins of ACO objects ==
Studies analyzing the albedo distribution of a sample of asteroids in cometary orbits, found in general that they exhibit lower albedos than objects with T_{j} > 3 and further concluded that all ACOs in that sample with T_{j} < 2.6 had albedos pV < 0.075 - similar to those measured for cometary nuclei - suggesting cometary origins.

A sample of objects, which included Kridsadaporn, was used in a study of the relationship between the Jovian Tisserand invariant and spectral properties of asteroids in cometary orbits, which determined that all observed ACOs within the sample with T_{j} < 2.9 were feature-less. Kridsadaporn, with its Jovian Tisserand invariant of 2.858, falls within the feature-less (without bands) comet-like spectral group. These studies also concluded that ACOs with featured spectra (with bands) typical of the main belt had T_{j} ≥ 2.9 while those with T_{j} < 2.9 demonstrated comet-like spectra, suggesting that the subsample of ACOs with 2.9 ≤ T_{j} ≤ 3.0 could be populated by a large fraction of interlopers from the inner part of the belt.

Kridsadaporn has a perihelion distance q = 1.3224 AU. A study of the relationship between the size distribution profile and perihelion distances of ACOs concluded that a sub-sample of ACOs with a perihelion distance q > 1.3 AU had a size distribution profile similar to that of the Jupiter family comets, suggesting that sub-sample to be composed of a significant fraction of dormant comets, while a large fraction of ACOs with q < 1.3 AU could more likely be scattered objects from the outer main belt.

Objects with a Jovian Tisserand invariant T_{j} ≤ 3 and taxonomic properties consistent with a low albedo, however, are not enough to imply that they are dormant or extinct comets. The fraction of low albedo, T_{j} ≤ 3, objects actually being dormant or extinct comets is estimated to be 65% ± 10%.
