= 130P/McNaught–Hughes =

Periodic comet

130P/McNaught-Hughes
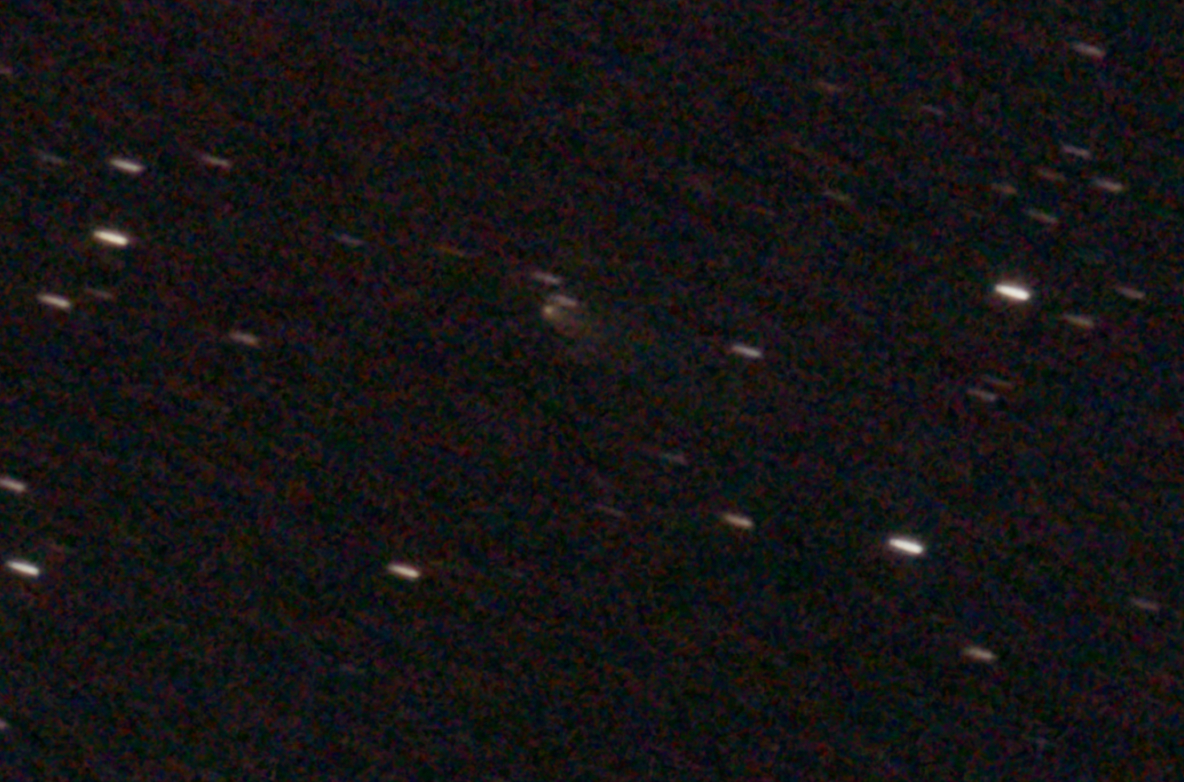
- Comet McNaught–Hughes imaged from an 8-in reflector on 3 August 2024

Discovery
- Discovered by: Robert H. McNaught; Shaun M. Hughes
- Discovery site: Siding Spring Observatory (UK Schmidt Telescope)
- Discovery date: 30 September 1991

Designations
- MPC designation: P/1991 S1, P/1997 H1
- Alternative designations: 1991 IX, 1991y

Orbital characteristics
- Epoch: 24 February 2018 (JD 2458173.5)
- Observation arc: 33.43 years
- Earliest precovery date: 14 September 1991
- Number of observations: 2,362
- Aphelion: 4.941 AU
- Perihelion: 1.824 AU
- Semi-major axis: 3.382 AU
- Eccentricity: 0.46079
- Orbital period: 6.219 years
- Inclination: 6.065°
- Longitude of ascending node: 70.256°
- Argument of periapsis: 245.91°
- Mean anomaly: 5.267°
- Last perihelion: 14 April 2024
- Next perihelion: 12 September 2030
- T_{Jupiter}: 2.962
- Earth MOID: 0.820 AU
- Jupiter MOID: 0.566 AU

Physical characteristics
- Mean radius: 2.67 km (1.66 mi)
- Comet total magnitude (M1): 10.4
- Comet nuclear magnitude (M2): 14.7

130P/McNaught–Hughes is a Jupiter-family comet with a 6.22-year orbit around the Sun. It is the second of two comets co-discovered by Robert H. McNaught and Shaun M. Hughes. (Note: The first comet that both astronomers had co-discovered was C/1990 M1 (McNaught–Hughes).)

== Physical characteristics ==
Initial estimates of in 1994 place the size of its nucleus to be around 4.2 km (2.6 mi) in diameter. Infrared observations from the Spitzer Space Telescope between 2006 and 2007 reveal the nucleus of this comet to be about 5.34 km (3.32 mi) in diameter.

== Notes ==
Numbered comets
Previous; 129P/Shoemaker–Levy	130P/McNaught–Hughes	Next; 131P/Mueller
