= C/1993 Y1 (McNaught–Russell) =

Non-periodic comet

Discovery
- Discovered by: Robert H. McNaught; Kenneth S. Russell
- Discovery site: Siding Spring Observatory
- Discovery date: 17 December 1993

Designations
- Alternative designations: 1994 XI, 1993v

Orbital characteristics
- Epoch: 28 April 1994 (JD 2449470.5)
- Observation arc: 265 days
- Number of observations: 377
- Aphelion: 270 AU (inbound); 240 AU (outbound)
- Perihelion: 0.8676 AU
- Eccentricity: 0.9932
- Orbital period: 1,600 years (inbound)
- Inclination: 51.586°
- Longitude of ascending node: 166.359°
- Argument of periapsis: 353.468°
- Last perihelion: 31 March 1994
- Next perihelion: ~3300
- T_{Jupiter}: 0.755
- Earth MOID: 0.1212 AU
- Jupiter MOID: 2.6212 AU

Physical characteristics
- Mean radius: 0.75±0.02 km
- Mass: 7.1×10^{11} kg
- Mean density: 480±60 kg/m^{3}
- Comet total magnitude (M1): 12.3
- Comet nuclear magnitude (M2): 16.9
- Apparent magnitude: 6.5 (1994 apparition)

Comet McNaught–Russell, formally designated as C/1993 Y1, is a long-period comet that reached a maximum magnitude of 6.5 (just below naked eye level) in early 1994. It was discovered by Robert H. McNaught and Kenneth S. Russell using the UK Schmidt Telescope in Australia. McNaught and Russell worked at Siding Spring Observatory and together discovered five comets between 1991 and 1995.

== Observational history ==
The comet was first spotted by Robert McNaught from a photographic plate exposed by Kenneth Russell on the night of 17 December 1993. At the time of discovery, the comet was a diffuse trail about 17.5 in apparent magnitude within the constellation Horologium. (Note: Reported initial position upon discovery was: α = 3^{h} 06.6^{m} , δ = –56° 33′)

== Orbit ==
Its orbital period was found to be very high – initially estimated at over 1400 years.

== Historical records ==
It was noted by Francois Colas (Paris observatory) and Ichiro Hasegawa that the path of McNaught–Russell coincided with that of comet C/574 G1, which was recorded in AD 574 over a period from April 4 to May 23 by observers in China. This would give the comet a period of 1430±30 years and so making it the longest period comet to be seen on two separate returns. Since the comet was not observed to approach any planets, its orbit should remain largely unchanged on its next return. This would place its next approach to the inner Solar System around 3300. However, a 2024 study concluded that while the paths of the 574 AD comet and Comet McNaught–Russell may have run parallel southward, the expected length of tail and brightness did not match the historical records of the ancient comet, therefore ruling out the possibility that this was an earlier apparition of McNaught–Russell.

== See also ==
- 153P/Ikeya–Zhang
- Great Comet of 1744
