= Uppsala Southern Schmidt Telescope =

Telescope in the Siding Spring Observatory, Australia

- Location: New South Wales, AUS
- Coordinates: 31°16′24″S 149°03′52″E
- Altitude: 1,150 m (3,770 ft)
- Built: 1956
- Diameter: 0.5 m (1 ft 8 in)
- Website: www.mso.anu.edu.au/~rmn/
- Location within Australia

The Uppsala Schmidt Telescope is a Schmidt telescope located in Australia. It was moved to Siding Spring Observatory from Mount Stromlo Observatory in 1982. The instrument has been used to study galaxies, asteroids and comets. It was last dedicated to the Siding Spring Survey. The telescope had a field of view of just over 6° through the use of a correcting plate, making its field three times as large as that of the Anglo-Australian Telescope. It used a spherical rather than a parabolic mirror with 0.6 m correcting plate to achieve this. Photographic plates and film were used as detectors.

== History ==
The Uppsala Schmidt Telescope was built in 1956 in Sweden. The telescope was originally located at the Mount Stromlo Observatory. It was operational there between 1957 and 1982. It took the first images ever recorded of the Sputnik satellite in 1957.

The telescope was modernised in 2000 and 2001 to include the experimental use of Charge-coupled devices (CCDs) which are 40 times more sensitive than standard photography. The Uppsala Schmidt telescope was the instrument used by the Siding Spring Survey to conduct the only professional search for dangerous asteroids being made in the Southern Hemisphere. The telescope was decommissioned by the ANU late in 2013 and the Siding Spring Survey near-Earth object search program closed down after funding dried up.

== Discoveries ==
The telescope was used by Robert H. McNaught to discover 400 potentially hazardous near-Earth asteroids which have a diameter greater than 100 metres (330 ft). McNaught used the telescope to discover comet C/2006 P1, also known as the Great Daylight Comet of 2007, on the night of 7 August 2006. That comet was the brightest seen in over 40 years.

Other notable discoveries made by the telescope include finding 7604 Kridsadaporn, C/2007 Q3, C/2009 R1, C/2013 A1 ("Siding Spring Comet"), 2012 LZ1, (242450) 2004 QY2 and (308242) 2005 GO21.

== See also ==
- List of telescopes of Australia
- List of large optical telescopes
