= Robert H. McNaught =

Scottish-Australian astronomer (born 1956)

Minor planets discovered: 483
see § List of discovered minor planets

Robert H. McNaught (born in Scotland in 1956) is a Scottish-Australian astronomer at the Research School of Astronomy and Astrophysics of the Australian National University (ANU). He has collaborated with David J. Asher of the Armagh Observatory.

The inner main-belt asteroid 3173 McNaught, discovered by Edward Bowell at Anderson Mesa Station in 1981, was named after him by its discoverer, following a suggestion by David Seargent.

== Work ==
McNaught is a prolific discoverer of asteroids and comets, described as "the world's greatest comet discoverer" and he participated in the Siding Spring Survey (SSS) using the ANU's Uppsala Southern Schmidt Telescope. He discovered the Great Comet C/2006 P1 on 7 August 2006, the brightest comet in several decades, which became easily visible to the naked eye for observers in the Southern Hemisphere. The SSS was the only active professional Near Earth Object survey in the Southern Hemisphere. The survey ended in 2013 after funding dried up.

McNaught previously worked on the Anglo-Australian Near-Earth Asteroid Survey from 1990 to 1996.

== Other work ==
McNaught worked at the University of Aston's satellite-tracking camera originally outside Evesham in 1982, thereafter at Herstmonceux and more recently at Siding Spring. In his spare time he successfully conducts patrols for novae, identifies images of prenovae and unusual variable stars on survey plates, measures their positions, makes astrometric observations of comets and minor planets and photometric observations of comets and novae. He also carries out extensive observational and computational work on meteors, as well as on occultations by minor planets.

== Funding issues ==
In October 2011, partly due to changes in the exchange rate between the Australian and US dollars, Catalina Sky Survey of NASA had to end funding McNaught's southern survey, which used to cost $110,000 per year, ending the international cooperation in July 2012. The astronomer estimated that the survey needs $180,000 annually, plus a small one-time sum to fix the observatory dome. For several months the project was temporarily funded from the ANU, but in late 2012, the ANU advised that it could no longer support the program and that funds would not be available from January 2013.

== Discoveries ==
=== List of cometary discoveries ===
In total, McNaught has discovered 82 comets.

==== Long-period ====
McNaught has discovered 44 long-period comets:

- C/1987 U3 (a. k. a. 1987 XXXII, 1987b_{1})
- C/2005 E2
- C/2005 L2
- C/2005 L3
- C/2005 S4
- C/2006 B1
- C/2006 E1
- C/2006 K1
- C/2006 K3
- C/2006 L2
- C/2006 P1 (Great Comet of 2007)
- C/2006 Q1
- C/2007 K6
- C/2007 M1
- C/2007 P1
- C/2007 T1
- C/2007 Y2
- C/2008 A1
- C/2008 J4
- C/2009 F2
- C/2009 F4
- C/2009 F5
- C/2009 K5
- C/2009 R1
- C/2009 T1
- C/2010 J2
- C/2011 C1
- C/2011 G1
- C/2011 L2
- C/2011 L3
- C/2011 N2
- C/2011 Q2
- C/2011 R1
- C/2012 C1
- C/2012 H2
- C/2012 K6
- C/2012 T4
- C/2012 Y3
- C/2013 A1
- C/2013 E1
- C/2013 F3
- C/2013 G2
- C/2013 G7
- C/2013 J3
- C/2013 O3

==== Short period ====
McNaught has discovered 26 short-period comets:

- 191P/McNaught
- 220P/McNaught
- 254P/McNaught
- 260P/McNaught
- 278P/McNaught
- P/2004 R1 (McNaught)
- P/2005 J1 (McNaught)
- P/2005 L1 (McNaught)
- P/2005 Y2 (McNaught)
- P/2006 G1 (McNaught)
- P/2006 H1 (McNaught)
- P/2007 H1 (McNaught)
- P/2008 J3 (McNaught)
- P/2008 O2 (McNaught)
- P/2008 Y3 (McNaught)
- P/2009 Q5 (McNaught)
- P/2009 S2 (McNaught)
- P/2009 U4 (McNaught)
- P/2010 J5 (McNaught)
- P/2011 L1 (McNaught)
- P/2011 P1 (McNaught)
- P/2011 Q3 (McNaught)
- P/2012 O1 (McNaught)
- P/2012 O2 (McNaught)
- P/2012 O3 (McNaught)
- P/2013 J2 (McNaught)

==== Co-discoveries ====
McNaught is the co-discoverer of the following comets:

- P/Catalina-McNaught (a.k.a. P/2008 S1, 2008 JK)
- P/McNaught-Hartley (a.k.a. P/1994 N2, 1994 XXXI, 1994n)
- Comet McNaught-Hartley (a.k.a. C/1999 T1)
- Comet McNaught-Tritton (a.k.a. C/1978 G2, 1978 XXVII)
- Comet McNaught-Watson (a.k.a. C/1999 S2)

==== Groups ====
Comets McNaught-Hughes

- C/1990 M1 (a.k.a. 1991 III, 1990g)
- 130P/McNaught-Hughes (a.k.a. 1991 IX, 1991y)

Comets McNaught-Russell

- C/1991 C3 (a.k.a. 1990 XIX, 1991g)
- C/1991 Q1 (a.k.a. 1992 XI, 1991v)
- C/1991 R1 (a.k.a. 1990 XXII, 1991w)
- C/1993 Y1 (a.k.a. 1994 XI, 1993v)
- 262P/McNaught-Russell (a.k.a. 1994 XXIV, 1994u)

=== List of discovered minor planets ===
As of 2016, Robert McNaught is credited by the Minor Planet Center with the discovery and co-discovery of 483 minor planets during 1975–2005.

3904 Honda	22 February 1988	list
4093 Bennett	4 November 1986	list
4128 UKSTU	28 January 1988	list
4129 Richelen	22 February 1988	list
4220 Flood	22 February 1988	list
4456 Mawson	27 July 1989	list
4499 Davidallen	4 January 1989	list
4504 Jenkinson	21 December 1989	list
4638 Estens	2 March 1989	list
4667 Robbiesh	4 November 1986	list
4678 Ninian	24 September 1990	list
4679 Sybil	9 October 1990	list
4699 Sootan	4 November 1986	list
4704 Sheena	28 January 1988	list
4710 Wade	4 January 1989	list
4713 Steel	26 August 1989	list
(4953) 1990 MU	23 June 1990	list
4956 Noymer	12 November 1990	list
4974 Elford	14 June 1990	list
5007 Keay	20 October 1990	list
5061 McIntosh	22 February 1988	list
5066 Garradd	22 June 1990	list
5068 Cragg	9 October 1990	list
5133 Phillipadams	12 August 1990	list
5136 Baggaley	20 October 1990	list

(5189) 1990 UQ	20 October 1990	list
5277 Brisbane	22 February 1988	list
5329 Decaro	21 December 1989	list
5335 Damocles	18 February 1991	list
5378 Ellyett	9 April 1991	list
5380 Sprigg	7 May 1991	list
5382 McKay	8 May 1991	list
5441 Andymurray	8 May 1991	list
5470 Kurtlindstrom	28 January 1988	list
5475 Hanskennedy	26 August 1989	list
5558 Johnnapier	24 November 1989	list
(5604) 1992 FE	26 March 1992	list
5625 Jamesferguson	7 January 1991	list
5627 Short	16 June 1991	list
(5645) 1990 SP	20 September 1990	list
5680 Nasmyth	30 December 1989	list
5682 Beresford	9 October 1990	list
5691 Fredwatson	26 March 1992	list
5739 Robertburns	24 November 1989	list
(5742) 1990 TN_{4}	9 October 1990	list
5747 Williamina	10 February 1991	list
5782 Akirafujiwara	7 January 1991	list
5786 Talos	3 September 1991	list
(5788) 1992 NJ	1 July 1992	list
5845 Davidbrewster	19 August 1988	list

5883 Josephblack	6 November 1993	list
5914 Kathywhaler	20 November 1990	list
5961 Watt	30 December 1989	list
6012 Williammurdoch	22 September 1990	list
6019 Telford	3 September 1991	list
(6021) 1991 TM	1 October 1991	list
(6038) 1989 EQ	4 March 1989	list
(6053) 1993 BW_{3}	30 January 1993	list
6130 Hutton	24 September 1989	list
6194 Denali	12 October 1990	list
6316 Méndez	9 October 1990	list
(6322) 1991 CQ	10 February 1991	list
6411 Tamaga	8 October 1993	list
(6454) 1991 UG_{1}	29 October 1991	list
(6455) 1992 HE	25 April 1992	list
6461 Adam	4 November 1993	list
6523 Clube	1 October 1991	list
6564 Asher	25 January 1992	list
6708 Bobbievaile	4 January 1989	list
6870 Pauldavies	28 July 1992	list
6906 Johnmills	19 November 1990	list
6907 Harryford	19 November 1990	list
6916 Lewispearce	27 July 1992	list
(6960) 1989 AL_{5}	4 January 1989	list
7096 Napier	3 November 1992	list

7120 Davidgavine	4 January 1989	list
7170 Livesey	30 June 1987	list
7177 Melvyntaylor	9 October 1990	list
7247 Robertstirling	12 October 1991	list
7345 Happer	28 July 1992	list
(7350) 1993 VA	7 November 1993	list
(7474) 1992 TC	1 October 1992	list
(7482) 1994 PC1	9 August 1994	list
(7582) 1990 WL	20 November 1990	list
(7588) 1992 FJ_{1}	24 March 1992	list
7604 Kridsadaporn	31 August 1995	list
7660 Alexanderwilson	5 November 1993	list
(7761) 1990 SL	20 September 1990	list
(7822) 1991 CS	13 February 1991	list
(7839) 1994 ND	3 July 1994	list
(7888) 1993 UC	20 October 1993	list
(7977) 1977 QQ_{5}	21 August 1977	list
8028 Joeengle	30 August 1991	list
8030 Williamknight	29 September 1991	list
(8037) 1993 HO_{1}	20 April 1993	list
8113 Matsue	21 April 1996	list^{[A]}
8115 Sakabe	24 April 1996	list^{[B]}
(8176) 1991 WA	29 November 1991	list
8218 Hosty	8 May 1996	list
(8219) 1996 JL	10 May 1996	list^{[C]}

8283 Edinburgh	30 September 1991	list
8368 Lamont	20 February 1991	list
8486 Asherschel	26 August 1989	list
8515 Corvan	4 September 1991	list
(8653) 1990 KE	20 May 1990	list
(8654) 1990 KC_{1}	20 May 1990	list
8842 Bennetmcinnes	20 May 1990	list
8899 Hughmiller	22 September 1995	list
(9047) 1991 QF	30 August 1991	list
9349 Lucas	30 September 1991	list
9391 Slee	14 August 1994	list
9583 Clerke	28 April 1990	list
9594 Garstang	4 September 1991	list
9714 Piazzismyth	1 June 1975	list
9843 Braidwood	4 January 1989	list
9850 Ralphcopeland	9 October 1990	list
9853 l'Épée	7 January 1991	list
9855 Thomasdick	7 February 1991	list
9857 Hecamede	10 March 1991	list
9873 Freundlich	9 April 1992	list
9881 Sampson	25 September 1994	list
9899 Greaves	12 March 1996	list
9984 Gregbryant	18 April 1996	list^{[D]}
9985 Akiko	12 May 1996	list^{[A]}
10058 Ikwilliamson	25 February 1988	list

10098 Jaymiematthews	30 September 1991	list
10188 Yasuoyoneda	14 May 1996	list^{[B]}
(10342) 1991 TQ	1 October 1991	list
(10511) 1989 OD	21 July 1989	list
(10525) 1990 TO	12 October 1990	list
10736 Marybrück	22 February 1988	list
10737 Brück	25 February 1988	list
10773 Jamespaton	7 January 1991	list
10841 Ericforbes	12 August 1994	list
(11030) 1988 PK	13 August 1988	list
(11036) 1989 AW_{5}	4 January 1989	list
(11052) 1990 WM	20 November 1990	list
(11062) 1991 SN	30 September 1991	list
(11093) 1994 HD	17 April 1994	list
(11597) 1995 KL_{1}	31 May 1995	list
(11889) 1991 AH_{2}	7 January 1991	list
(11890) 1991 FF	18 March 1991	list
(11903) 1991 RD_{7}	2 September 1991	list
(12263) 1989 YA_{4}	30 December 1989	list
(12273) 1990 TS_{4}	9 October 1990	list
(12305) 1991 TE_{1}	12 October 1991	list
12378 Johnston	15 August 1994	list
12446 Juliabryant	15 August 1996	list^{[D]}
(12705) 1990 TJ	12 October 1990	list
(12732) 1991 TN	1 October 1991	list

12819 Susumutakahasi	12 May 1996	list^{[B]}
(13016) 1988 DB_{5}	25 February 1988	list
(13020) 1988 PW_{2}	10 August 1988	list
(13036) 1989 YO_{3}	30 December 1989	list
(13060) 1991 EJ	10 March 1991	list
(13110) 1993 LS_{1}	15 June 1993	list
(13120) 1993 VU_{7}	4 November 1993	list
13176 Kobedaitenken	21 April 1996	list^{[A]}
(13505) 1989 AB_{3}	4 January 1989	list
(13506) 1989 AF_{3}	4 January 1989	list
(13507) 1989 AN_{5}	4 January 1989	list
(13517) 1990 UU_{1}	20 October 1990	list
(13522) 1991 FG	18 March 1991	list
(13537) 1991 SG	29 September 1991	list
(13538) 1991 ST	30 September 1991	list
(13539) 1991 TY	2 October 1991	list
13551 Gadsden	26 March 1992	list
(13929) 1988 PL	13 August 1988	list
(13953) 1990 TO_{4}	9 October 1990	list
13957 NARIT	7 January 1991	list
(13968) 1991 RE_{7}	2 September 1991	list
(14374) 1989 SA	21 September 1989	list
(14409) 1991 RM_{1}	5 September 1991	list
14420 Massey	30 September 1991	list
(14421) 1991 SA_{1}	30 September 1991	list

(14464) 1993 HC_{1}	21 April 1993	list
(14471) 1993 SG_{1}	21 September 1993	list
(14879) 1991 AL_{2}	7 January 1991	list
(15227) 1986 VA	4 November 1986	list
(15234) 1988 BJ_{5}	28 January 1988	list
(15235) 1988 DA_{5}	25 February 1988	list
(15270) 1991 AE_{2}	7 January 1991	list
(15289) 1991 TL	1 October 1991	list
(15290) 1991 TF_{1}	12 October 1991	list
(15334) 1993 UE	20 October 1993	list
(15337) 1993 VT_{2}	7 November 1993	list
15368 Katsuji	14 May 1996	list^{[B]}
(15725) 1990 TX_{4}	9 October 1990	list
(15726) 1990 TG_{5}	9 October 1990	list
(15848) 1995 YJ_{4}	28 December 1995	list
(16440) 1989 EN_{5}	2 March 1989	list
(16460) 1989 YF_{1}	30 December 1989	list
(16468) 1990 HW_{1}	27 April 1990	list
(16489) 1990 SG	17 September 1990	list
(16504) 1990 TR_{5}	9 October 1990	list
(16506) 1990 UH_{1}	20 October 1990	list
(16517) 1990 WD	19 November 1990	list
(16657) 1993 UB	23 October 1993	list
(17411) 1988 DF_{3}	22 February 1988	list
(17425) 1989 AM_{3}	4 January 1989	list

(17448) 1990 HU_{1}	27 April 1990	list
(17485) 1991 RP_{9}	5 September 1991	list
(17487) 1991 SY	30 September 1991	list
17503 Celestechild	26 March 1992	list
17555 Kenkennedy	4 November 1993	list
17640 Mount Stromlo	15 August 1996	list^{[D]}
18376 Quirk	30 September 1991	list
18377 Vetter	28 September 1991	list
(18393) 1992 QB	19 August 1992	list
18412 Kruszelnicki	13 June 1993	list
18413 Adamspencer	13 June 1993	list
(18496) 1996 JN_{1}	9 May 1996	list
(18506) 1996 PY_{6}	15 August 1996	list^{[D]}
(18514) 1996 TE_{11}	14 October 1996	list
(19146) 1989 YY	30 December 1989	list
(19147) 1989 YV_{4}	30 December 1989	list
(19151) 1990 KD_{1}	20 May 1990	list
(19170) 1991 FH	18 March 1991	list
(19181) 1991 SD_{1}	30 September 1991	list
(19261) 1995 MB	21 June 1995	list
(19986) 1990 KD	20 May 1990	list
20002 Tillysmith	10 March 1991	list
20015 Liguori	30 September 1991	list
20043 Ellenmacarthur	2 March 1993	list
(20086) 1994 LW	12 June 1994	list

(20111) 1995 SO_{5}	22 September 1995	list
(20494) 1999 PM_{1}	3 August 1999	list
(20691) 1999 VY_{72}	11 November 1999	list
(21005) 1988 BF_{5}	28 January 1988	list
(21063) 1991 JC_{2}	8 May 1991	list
21073 Darksky	4 September 1991	list
(21100) 1992 OB	26 July 1992	list
(21150) 1993 LF_{1}	13 June 1993	list
(21151) 1993 LO_{1}	13 June 1993	list
(21153) 1993 MF_{1}	18 June 1993	list
(21193) 1994 PJ_{1}	14 August 1994	list
(21194) 1994 PN_{1}	11 August 1994	list
21262 Kanba	24 April 1996	list^{[A]}
(22326) 1991 SZ	30 September 1991	list
(22327) 1991 TS	1 October 1991	list
(22367) 1993 MZ	18 June 1993	list
(23183) 2000 OY_{21}	28 July 2000	list
(23449) 1988 BG_{5}	28 January 1988	list
(23453) 1988 QR	19 August 1988	list
(23474) 1990 UX_{1}	20 October 1990	list
(23480) 1991 EL	10 March 1991	list
(23493) 1991 SO	30 September 1991	list
(23615) 1996 FK_{12}	28 March 1996	list
(24660) 1988 BH_{5}	28 January 1988	list
(24672) 1989 OJ	27 July 1989	list

24680 Alleven	30 December 1989	list
(24688) 1990 KE_{1}	20 May 1990	list
(24698) 1990 TU_{4}	9 October 1990	list
(24718) 1991 SW	30 September 1991	list
(24719) 1991 SE_{1}	30 September 1991	list
(24721) 1991 TJ	1 October 1991	list
(24722) 1991 TK	1 October 1991	list
(24819) 1994 XY_{4}	6 December 1994	list
(26098) 1989 AN_{3}	4 January 1989	list
(26118) 1991 TH	1 October 1991	list
(26142) 1994 PL_{1}	3 August 1994	list
(26152) 1994 UF	24 October 1994	list
(26903) 1995 YT_{3}	20 December 1995	list
(27723) 1990 QA	19 August 1990	list
(27738) 1990 TT_{4}	9 October 1990	list
(27743) 1990 VM	8 November 1990	list
(27760) 1991 RB_{7}	2 September 1991	list
(27766) 1991 TO	1 October 1991	list
(27767) 1991 TP	1 October 1991	list
(27784) 1992 OE	27 July 1992	list
(27842) 1994 QJ	28 August 1994	list
(28395) 1999 RZ_{42}	3 September 1999	list
(29143) 1988 DK	22 February 1988	list
(29213) 1991 SJ	29 September 1991	list
(30795) 1989 AR_{5}	4 January 1989	list

(30808) 1989 YA_{2}	30 December 1989	list
(30824) 1990 TD	9 October 1990	list
(30930) 1993 UF	20 October 1993	list
(30969) 1995 BP_{2}	29 January 1995	list
(31017) 1996 EH_{2}	15 March 1996	list
(31044) 1996 NY	11 July 1996	list
(32171) 2000 ND_{10}	1 July 2000	list
(32802) 1990 SK	20 September 1990	list
(35107) 1991 VH	9 November 1991	list
(35134) 1992 RE	4 September 1992	list
(35159) 1993 LH_{1}	13 June 1993	list
(35183) 1993 UY_{2}	20 October 1993	list
(35198) 1994 PM_{1}	9 August 1994	list
(37638) 1993 VB	6 November 1993	list
(37649) 1994 FC	19 March 1994	list
(37650) 1994 FP	21 March 1994	list
(39532) 1990 HZ_{1}	27 April 1990	list
(39561) 1992 QA	19 August 1992	list
(39563) 1992 RB	2 September 1992	list
(39591) 1993 LR_{1}	15 June 1993	list
(39618) 1994 LT	12 June 1994	list
(39636) 1995 BQ_{2}	29 January 1995	list
(41504) 2000 QY_{148}	29 August 2000	list
(42490) 1991 SU	30 September 1991	list
(42491) 1991 TF	1 October 1991	list

(42847) 1999 RC_{43}	11 September 1999	list
(42930) 1999 TM_{11}	6 October 1999	list
(42933) 1999 TR_{19}	15 October 1999	list
(43764) 1988 BL_{5}	28 January 1988	list
(43797) 1991 AF_{2}	7 January 1991	list
(43869) 1994 RD_{11}	10 September 1994	list
(46544) 1988 QO	19 August 1988	list
46568 Stevenlee	30 September 1991	list
(46597) 1993 DK_{2}	24 February 1993	list
(46605) 1993 HQ_{1}	18 April 1993	list
(46667) 1996 HM_{2}	18 April 1996	list
(48438) 1989 WJ_{2}	21 November 1989	list
(48440) 1989 YO_{2}	30 December 1989	list
(48462) 1991 RT_{6}	3 September 1991	list
(48467) 1991 SB_{1}	30 September 1991	list
(48527) 1993 LC_{1}	13 June 1993	list
(48560) 1993 UX_{2}	20 October 1993	list
(48561) 1993 UZ_{2}	21 October 1993	list
(48605) 1995 CW_{1}	7 February 1995	list
(50365) 2000 CP_{77}	7 February 2000	list
(52290) 1990 SF	17 September 1990	list
(52297) 1991 CH_{2}	12 February 1991	list
(52310) 1991 VJ	9 November 1991	list
(52338) 1992 RH_{1}	2 September 1992	list
(52439) 1994 QL	16 August 1994	list

(52440) 1994 QN	26 August 1994	list
(52460) 1995 DA_{3}	24 February 1995	list
(55740) 1989 YL_{2}	30 December 1989	list
(55770) 1992 OW	28 July 1992	list
(56801) 2000 PF_{9}	6 August 2000	list
(58177) 1990 TB_{6}	9 October 1990	list
(58178) 1990 UY_{1}	20 October 1990	list
(58187) 1991 TD	1 October 1991	list
(58291) 1994 GA	1 April 1994	list
(58296) 1994 LF_{1}	2 June 1994	list
(58325) 1994 RE_{11}	11 September 1994	list
(58330) 1994 TK	3 October 1994	list
(58419) 1996 BD_{4}	26 January 1996	list
(59798) 1999 PO_{1}	3 August 1999	list
(61349) 2000 PD_{9}	6 August 2000	list
(61350) 2000 PL_{9}	6 August 2000	list
(61731) 2000 QV_{148}	29 August 2000	list
(65671) 1988 DE_{3}	22 February 1988	list
(65690) 1991 DG	20 February 1991	list
(65706) 1992 NA	1 July 1992	list
(65717) 1993 BX_{3}	31 January 1993	list
(65730) 1993 LP_{1}	14 June 1993	list
(65750) 1993 UV_{2}	20 October 1993	list
(68728) 2002 EP_{6}	6 March 2002	list
(69307) 1992 ON	28 July 1992	list

(69331) 1993 LE_{1}	13 June 1993	list
(69332) 1993 LJ_{1}	13 June 1993	list
(69401) 1995 QV_{3}	26 August 1995	list
(70453) 1999 TS_{19}	15 October 1999	list
(73674) 1988 BN_{5}	28 January 1988	list
(73698) 1991 TE	1 October 1991	list
(73804) 1995 RG	3 September 1995	list
(74820) 1999 TN_{11}	7 October 1999	list
(79139) 1991 SP	30 September 1991	list
(79141) 1991 TB	1 October 1991	list
(79220) 1994 PO_{1}	12 August 1994	list
(85159) 1988 DL	22 February 1988	list
(85166) 1989 OC	21 July 1989	list
(85212) 1992 RF	4 September 1992	list
(85236) 1993 KH	24 May 1993	list
(86067) 1999 RM_{28}	3 September 1999	list
(86480) 2000 CT_{97}	9 February 2000	list
(87275) 2000 PZ_{8}	4 August 2000	list
(87276) 2000 PE_{9}	6 August 2000	list
(90705) 1989 AZ_{5}	4 January 1989	list
(90710) 1990 TF_{6}	9 October 1990	list
(90731) 1992 OC	26 July 1992	list
(90809) 1995 DX_{2}	24 February 1995	list
(90810) 1995 DY_{2}	24 February 1995	list
(90862) 1996 KM_{1}	22 May 1996	list^{[D]}

(92587) 2000 PH_{9}	6 August 2000	list
(93048) 2000 SB_{7}	22 September 2000	list
(94045) 2000 XO_{54}	11 December 2000	list
(95683) 2002 JA	2 May 2002	list
(96179) 1988 DX_{4}	25 February 1988	list
(96237) 1993 VL_{1}	4 November 1993	list
(97520) 2000 DA_{18}	25 February 2000	list
(100044) 1991 TX	1 October 1991	list
(100118) 1993 LG_{1}	13 June 1993	list
(100201) 1994 FD	19 March 1994	list
(100202) 1994 GB	2 April 1994	list
(100276) 1994 XV	6 December 1994	list
(100333) 1995 SN_{5}	22 September 1995	list
(101969) 1999 RJ_{45}	13 September 1999	list
(103806) 2000 DZ_{17}	25 February 2000	list
(105107) 2000 LY_{14}	2 June 2000	list
105211 Sanden	29 July 2000	list
(119904) 2002 EX_{6}	6 March 2002	list
(120152) 2003 HJ_{1}	21 April 2003	list
(120640) 1996 PN	9 August 1996	list^{[D]}
(122215) 2000 NE_{10}	1 July 2000	list
(127451) 2002 PZ_{140}	14 August 2002	list
(127934) 2003 HK_{1}	22 April 2003	list
(129493) 1995 BM_{2}	29 January 1995	list
(132161) 2002 EZ_{6}	6 March 2002	list

(132790) 2002 PW_{140}	14 August 2002	list
(134366) 1995 LC	1 June 1995	list
(134371) 1995 RH	3 September 1995	list
(134380) 1995 YH_{4}	28 December 1995	list
(135737) 2002 PV_{140}	14 August 2002	list
(135738) 2002 PX_{140}	14 August 2002	list
(136121) 2003 OA	18 July 2003	list
(136770) 1996 PC_{1}	11 August 1996	list
(139462) 2001 OD_{84}	22 July 2001	list
(141492) 2002 EB_{7}	6 March 2002	list
(148513) 2001 OE_{113}	22 July 2001	list
(152558) 1990 SA	16 September 1990	list
(152561) 1991 RB	4 September 1991	list
(153031) 2000 PM_{9}	6 August 2000	list
(154594) 2003 OB	18 July 2003	list
(158013) 2000 QW_{148}	29 August 2000	list
(159367) 1977 OX	22 July 1977	list
(160019) 1994 FE	19 March 1994	list
(160325) 2003 NV_{1}	2 July 2003	list
(160509) 1990 EG_{5}	4 March 1990	list
(162003) 1991 TG	1 October 1991	list
(162014) 1994 RF_{11}	11 September 1994	list
(162015) 1994 TF_{2}	5 October 1994	list
(162039) 1996 JG	8 May 1996	list
(163189) 2002 EU_{6}	6 March 2002	list

(166485) 2002 PA_{141}	14 August 2002	list
(168334) 1994 PQ_{1}	12 August 1994	list
(175706) 1996 FG3	24 March 1996	list
(180825) 2005 GS_{9}	2 April 2005	list
(181748) 1996 DC_{2}	26 February 1996	list
(183029) 2002 PU_{140}	14 August 2002	list
(191096) 2002 EO_{6}	6 March 2002	list
(192290) 1989 QT	26 August 1989	list
(196415) 2003 HE	21 April 2003	list
(196516) 2003 OJ	18 July 2003	list
(201500) 2003 LV_{2}	2 June 2003	list
(210831) 2001 OB_{84}	17 July 2001	list
(213008) 1995 DB_{3}	24 February 1995	list
(215100) 1992 RD	2 September 1992	list
(215101) 1995 LB	1 June 1995	list
(215591) 2003 OH	18 July 2003	list
(222829) 2002 EG_{7}	6 March 2002	list
(225333) 1998 QB_{105}	30 August 1998	list
(229915) 1990 SH	17 September 1990	list
(229958) 1999 RD_{43}	13 September 1999	list
(231786) 2000 CU_{97}	9 February 2000	list
(238116) 2003 OE	18 July 2003	list
(242493) 2004 WO_{12}	22 November 2004	list
(244274) 2002 EC_{7}	6 March 2002	list
(246877) 1995 DZ_{2}	24 February 1995	list

(247742) 2003 LJ_{6}	8 June 2003	list
(272282) 2005 SX	22 September 2005	list
(282357) 2003 HL_{1}	22 April 2003	list
(297244) 1994 UW_{1}	29 October 1994	list
(297249) 1995 DQ_{2}	25 February 1995	list
(301855) 1995 CY_{1}	7 February 1995	list
(306611) 2000 PA_{9}	4 August 2000	list
(322074) 2010 VB_{112}	13 April 2004	list
(322532) 2011 YQ_{20}	31 March 2004	list
(322716) 2000 PG_{9}	6 August 2000	list
(322928) 2002 ET_{6}	6 March 2002	list
(326485) 2002 EQ_{6}	6 March 2002	list
(326487) 2002 EC_{51}	6 March 2002	list
(333929) 1999 UP_{2}	16 October 1999	list
(334768) 2003 SR_{76}	18 September 2003	list
(337245) 2000 QX_{148}	29 August 2000	list
(347786) 2002 EY_{6}	6 March 2002	list
(350518) 2000 CH_{72}	4 February 2000	list
(360192) 1991 FB	18 March 1991	list
(376713) 1995 WQ_{5}	24 November 1995	list
(380162) 2000 PB_{9}	6 August 2000	list
(380502) 2004 DZ_{69}	4 January 2004	list
(382395) 1990 SM	22 September 1990	list^{[E]}
(382825) 2003 XB_{22}	15 December 2003	list
(399785) 2005 NM_{63}	5 July 2005	list

(415690) 1992 UB	21 October 1992	list
(423325) 2005 GT_{9}	2 April 2005	list
(427510) 2002 ES_{6}	6 March 2002	list
(433940) 1995 QX_{9}	18 August 1995	list
(434084) 2002 CA_{19}	6 February 2002	list
(455172) 1999 QJ	17 August 1999	list
(480808) 1994 XL1	6 December 1994	list
(480825) 1999 PL_{1}	3 August 1999	list
(551254) 2013 AR_{58}	7 March 2002	list
(568112) 2003 RU_{28}	5 September 2003	list^{[F]}
(568625) 2004 NY_{33}	15 July 2004	list
(572574) 2008 RB_{143}	7 March 2002	list
(582394) 2015 TR_{241}	6 March 2002	list
(592455) 2014 WH_{330}	5 September 2003	list^{[F]}
(604035) 2015 KR_{58}	6 March 2002	list
(608948) 2004 OJ_{17}	22 July 2004	list
(612219) 2001 MM_{8}	20 June 2001	list
(620270) 2002 PD_{141}	14 August 2002	list^{[G]}
(628644) 2015 VV_{119}	14 August 2002	list^{[G]}
(640786) 2002 EW_{6}	6 March 2002	list
(641291) 2003 OF	18 July 2003	list^{[F]}
(680094) 1999 TE_{21}	14 September 1999	list
(685655) 2009 WG_{30}	17 September 2003	list^{[F]}
(688426) 2012 TX_{307}	16 September 2003	list^{[F]}
(691698) 2014 QH_{410}	5 September 2003	list^{[F]}

(700539) 2002 PB_{141}	14 August 2002	list^{[G]}
(721861) 2004 QK_{8}	2 September 1992	list^{[H]}
(730153) 2011 WQ_{48}	3 September 1999	list^{[G]}
(731382) 2013 EN_{22}	24 October 2005	list
(740521) 2003 SL_{290}	6 September 2003	list^{[F]}
(774173) 2002 EE_{7}	6 March 2002	list
(819868) 2014 OJ_{53}	18 July 2003	list^{[F]}
(827050) 1999 SF_{1}	18 September 1999	list
(828443) 2004 NM_{30}	15 July 2004	list
(847727) 2001 QV_{108}	23 August 2001	list
(875643) 2005 NO_{133}	5 July 2005	list
Co-discovery made with:^{A} H. Abe^{B} Y. Ikari^{C} T. Kojima^{D} J. B. Child^{E} P. McKenzie^{F} G.J. Garradd^{G} K. S. Russell^{H} A. Savage

=== List of novae ===
- Nova Reticuli 2020

== See also ==
- List of minor planet discoverers § R. H. McNaught
