= Siding Spring =

Siding Spring may refer to:

- Siding Spring Observatory, an astronomical observatory in Australia
  - Siding Spring 2.3 m Telescope, the telescope at Siding Spring Observatory
  - Siding Spring Survey, a near-Earth object search program
- 2343 Siding Spring, an asteroid from the main asteroid belt
- Comet Siding Spring (disambiguation), a number of different comets
