= Great Melbourne Telescope =

Telescope built in 1868

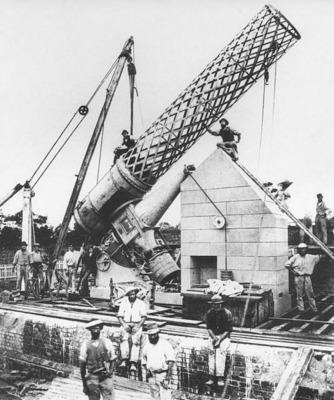
- The Great Melbourne Telescope being installed in 1869 after it was shipped in pieces from the works of Howard Grubb, Dublin.
- Location: Victoria, AUS
- Coordinates: 37°49′47″S 144°58′34″E
- Location within Australia
- Related media on Commons

The Great Melbourne Telescope was built by the Grubb Telescope Company in Dublin, Ireland in 1868, and installed at the Melbourne Observatory in Melbourne, Australia in 1869. In 1945 that Observatory closed and the telescope was sold and moved to the Mount Stromlo Observatory near Canberra. It was rebuilt in the late 1950s. In 2003 the telescope, still in use as an observatory, was severely damaged in a bushfire. About 70% of the components were salvageable; a project to restore the telescope to working condition started in 2013.

With a 48 inch (1.22 metre) diameter primary mirror, it was one of the largest telescopes of the late 19th century. This is a significant size even into the 21st century, although the lower reflecting ability of speculum metal mirrors (about 2/3 reflected) makes them inferior to later metal-on-glass designs or large refractors. This was significantly larger than the largest refractors of the period such as the Lick telescope and Yerkes, although those were both in the northern hemisphere (they would view the northern skies as opposed to the southern)

== Specifications ==
The telescope had a 48-inch-diameter (1,200 mm) speculum primary mirror, and was mounted on an equatorial mounting, enabling it to track the stars accurately as they appeared to move across the sky. The design had been approved by a committee of leading British astronomers and scientists. At the time of commissioning it was the second largest telescope operating in the world, after Lord Rosse's 6 foot reflector at Birr, Ireland, and it was the largest fully steerable telescope in the world. (Note: Herschel's 49.5 inch and Lassell's 48 inch reflectors were no longer in use by 1869; see List of largest optical telescopes historically.)

The telescope was designed to explore the nebulae visible from the southern hemisphere, and in particular to document whether any changes had occurred in the nebulae since they were charted by John Herschel in the 1830s at the Cape of Good Hope.

== History ==
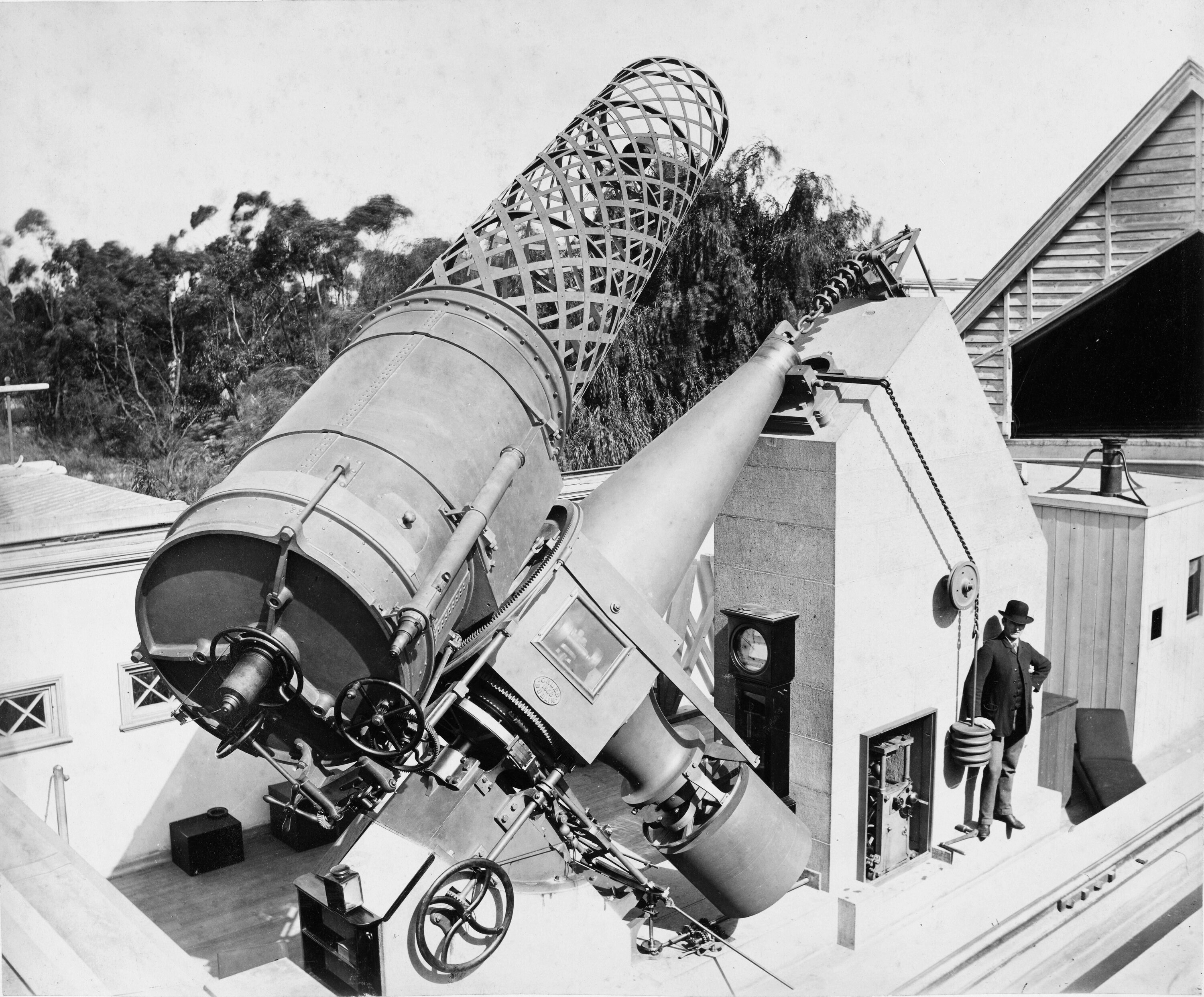
Great Melbourne Telescope 1880

The Great Melbourne Telescope was built by Thomas Grubb in Dublin, Ireland in 1868, and installed at the Melbourne Observatory in Melbourne, Australia in 1869.

After some initial teething problems, the telescope was used for about 20 years at Melbourne Observatory, and one volume of observations produced, along with spectroscopic observations and some pioneering attempts at photographing nebulae. The telescope was upgraded with the addition of photographic equipment in 1872, but the difficulties of repolishing the mirror and the telescope's relative unsuitability for astrophotography deterred further use.

When Melbourne Observatory closed in 1945, the Great Melbourne Telescope was sold to the Australian Government's Mount Stromlo Observatory near Canberra. It was rebuilt in the late 1950s with modern drive and a new 50-inch (1,300 mm) pyrex mirror. In the early 1990s the telescope, still utilising Grubb's original equatorial mounting, was rebuilt with two charge-coupled device (CCD) arrays to detect MACHOs (massive astrophysical compact halo objects). This made it Australia's first professional robotic and computerized digital imaging telescope.

=== Destruction ===
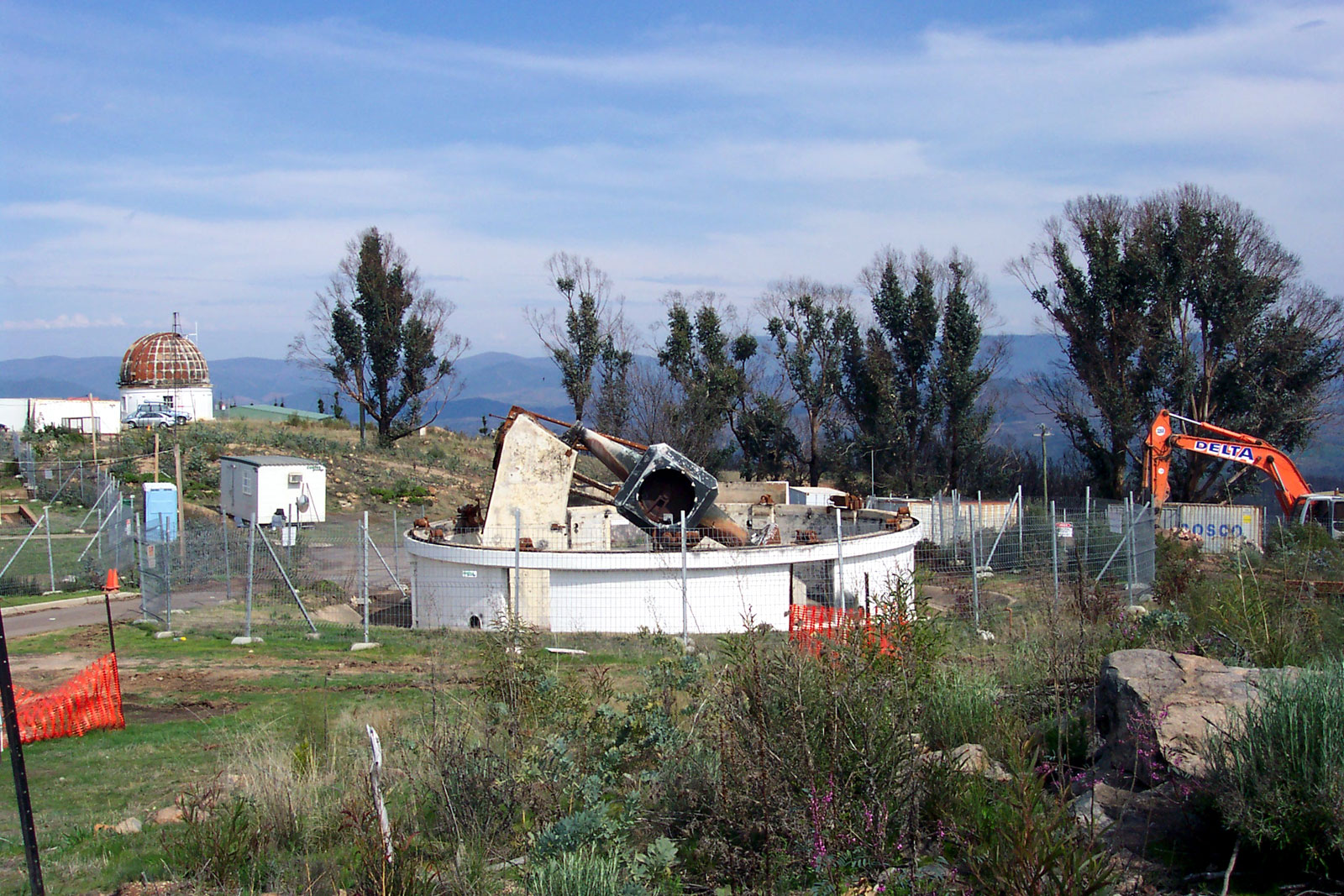
The remains of the telescope after the 2003 fire.

In January 2003 an extreme bushfire destroyed the telescopes and buildings at Mount Stromlo - the temperatures were so high that the aluminium dome itself caught fire and melted onto the telescope, shattering the mirror. The fire-ravaged remnants of the telescope were transferred to Museum Victoria, which had previously acquired discarded parts of the original telescope in 1984.

=== Restoration project ===
After the fire about 70% of the Great Melbourne Telescope's components remained in reusable condition. A project was set up to restore it to working order and bring its optical, mechanical and electrical systems into line with current best practice, so that it may be used for educational and public viewing in its original home at the Melbourne Observatory. This is a joint undertaking of Museum Victoria, the Astronomical Society of Victoria and the Melbourne Royal Botanic Gardens. After more than five years weighing up different proposals, engineering work commenced in late 2013 thanks to a grant of A$70,000 from the Copland Foundation. As of 2021 restoration work was continuing. The Victorian government committed $600,000 for the first stage of the restoration, and private benefactors also provided financial support. In November 2019, the main structure of the telescope was reassembled for the first time in 74 years.

== Timeline ==
1849	The British Association for the Advancement of Science calls for a large reflecting telescope to be erected in the Southern Hemisphere.
1853	First astronomical observatory at Williamstown.
1863	Melbourne Observatory opens.
1865	The Victorian Government orders the telescope from Thomas Grubb, Dublin.
1868	Great Melbourne Telescope (GMT) arrives in Melbourne.
1869	Observations of nebulae, comet and Neptune are made.
1872	The telescope was upgraded with the addition of photographic equipment
1883	First photos taken of Orion Nebula from Southern Hemisphere.
1894	GMT used for sketches of Mars at its close approach to Earth.
1944	Melbourne Observatory closes.
1945	GMT moves to Mount Stromlo Observatory near Canberra.
1961	Telescope rebuilt with a 1.25m pyrex mirror and new controls. Used for photoelectric photometry and infrared observations.
1973	Decommissioned when a bearing fails.
1992	GMT rebuilt for the MACHO project to detect evidence of dark matter.
2003	Bushfires destroy major telescopes and buildings at Mount Stromlo.
2008	Remaining parts of GMT returned to Melbourne.
2009	SkyMapper a telescope built to replace GMT opened at Siding Spring Observatory.
2012	Museum Victoria, the Astronomical Society of Victoria and the Royal Botanic Gardens start a collaboration to restore the telescope at Melbourne Observatory.
2019	Main structure re-assembled for the first time in 74 years.

== See also ==
- List of largest optical telescopes of the 19th century
- List of telescopes of Australia
