= Melbourne Observatory =

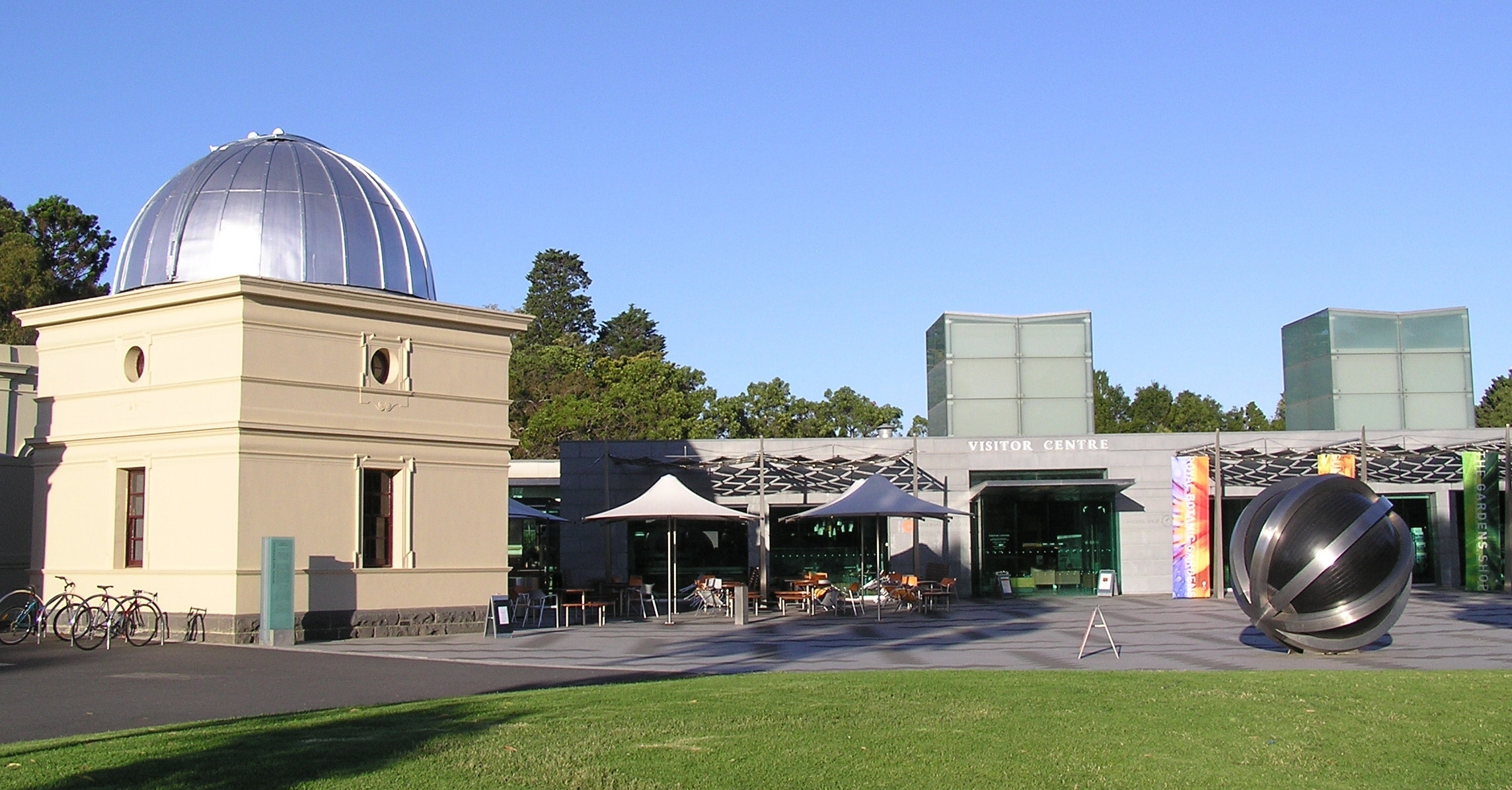
- The entrance to the observatory
- Observatory code: 907
- Location: Victoria, AUS
- Coordinates: 37°49′47″S 144°58′30″E
- Website: asv.org.au/Melbourne-Observatory
- Telescopes: Great Melbourne Telescope
- Related media on Commons

Melbourne Observatory is an observatory located on a hill adjacent to the Royal Botanic Gardens Victoria. The observatory commenced operations in 1863 and was decommissioned from official Government work in 1945. The observatory has since continued as an astronomical observatory and remains open to the public. Melbourne Observatory is also permanently on the Australian National Heritage List under 'Melbourne's Domain Parkland and Memorial Precinct' since early 2018.

== History ==
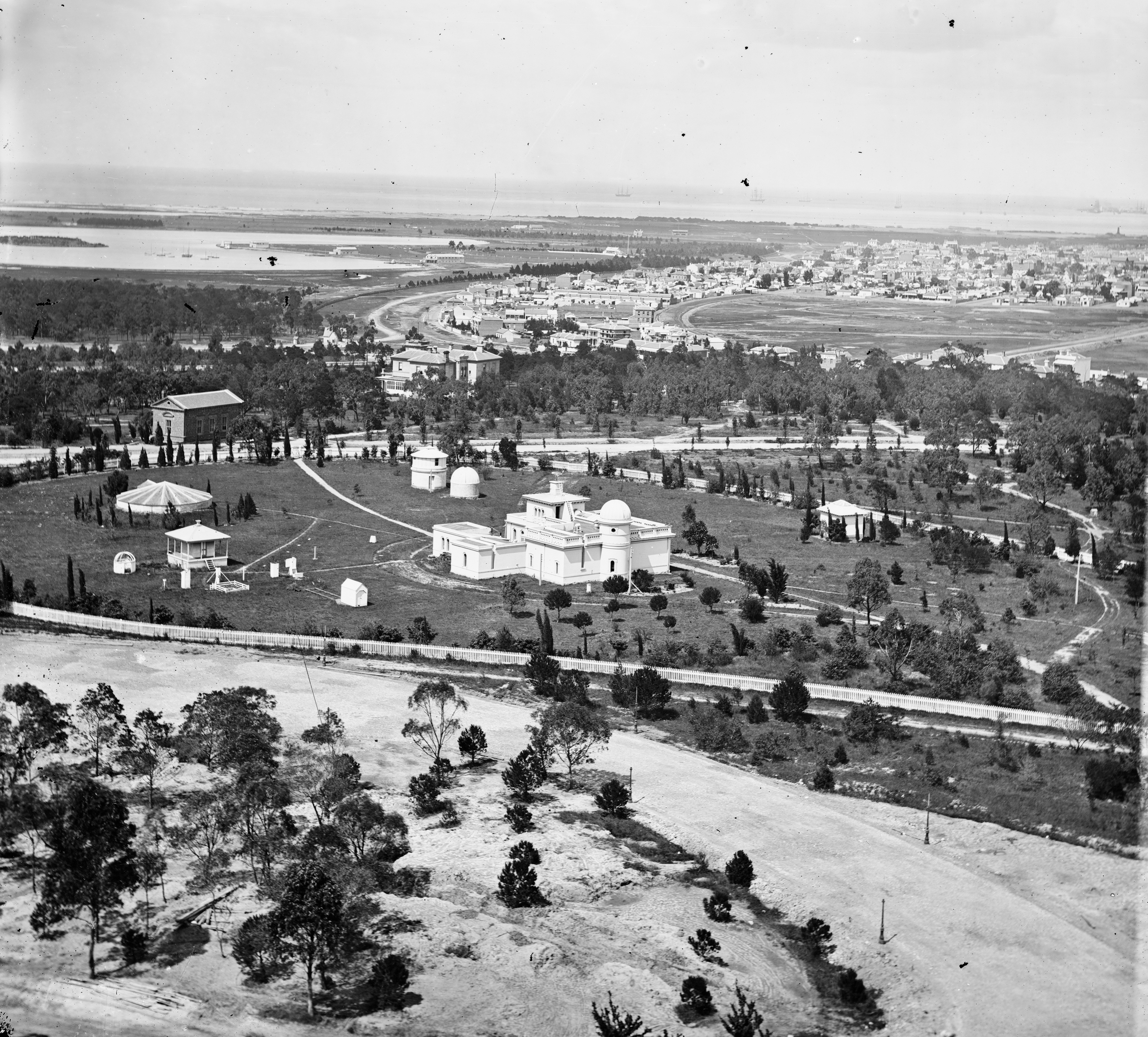
Old Melbourne Observatory c. 1873

Melbourne Observatory was founded in 1862 to serve as a scientific research institution for the rapidly growing city of Melbourne, the capital of the colony of Victoria. The observatory was tasked by the Victorian government with maintaining an accurate time reference for the colony through observations of stars using a transit telescope as well as general astronomical research.

The idea for a Melbourne Observatory was first proposed by English astronomer William Parkinson Wilson in a paper read before The Philosophical Institute of Victoria in 1856; and soon after a committee was formed to "achieve Wilson's 'noble object'". The site chosen was a gentle hill adjacent to the Royal Botanic Gardens.

Shortly after founding a 48-inch (120 cm) telescope was installed at the observatory for astronomical research and for a while it was the largest fully steerable telescope in the world. This instrument was referred to as the "Great Melbourne Telescope".

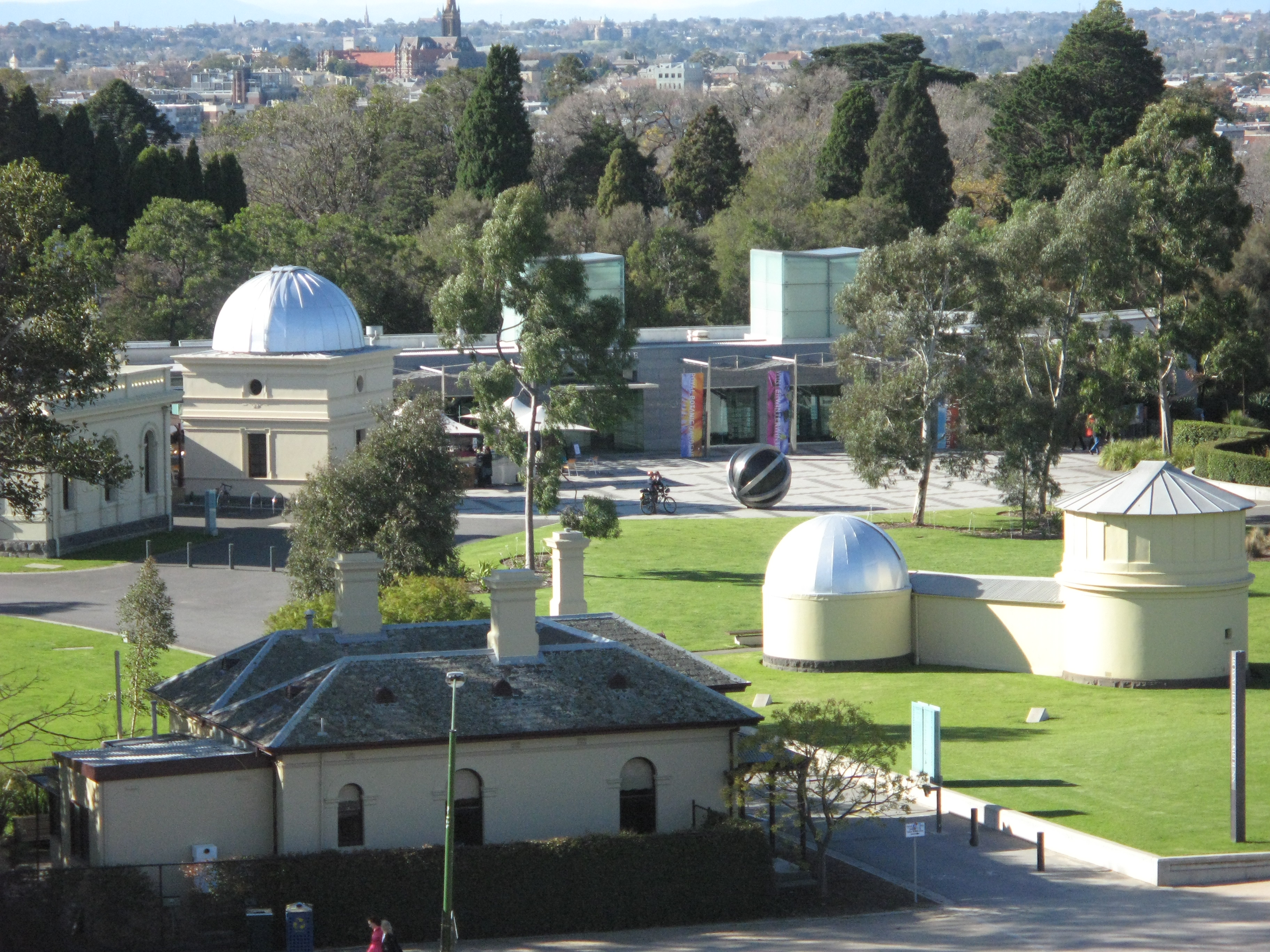
The Melbourne Observatory viewed from the Shrine of Remembrance.

In 1874 the observatory took part in the worldwide effort to observe the Transit of Venus in order to better determine the distance of Earth to the Sun.

Towards the end of the 1880s the observatory took part in the international "Carte du Ciel" project to map the heavens using the, then novel, technique of photography. Being the most southerly of the sites taking part, Melbourne was assigned the region around the south celestial pole south of declination -65°.

With the coming of federation in 1901 the Commonwealth government was assigned the responsibility for astronomy and time-keeping and control of the observatory was gradually handed over by the state government. At the same time, the encroaching light pollution from the growing city of Melbourne gradually made quality astronomical observations increasingly difficult. Then, in 1933 the flood-lit Shrine of Remembrance was completed in the parkland adjacent to the observatory impacting its skies further, until the observatory was finally closed in 1945. Most of the scientific equipment and instruments, including the Great Melbourne Telescope, were sold or moved elsewhere.

Today, while most of the original buildings still stand on the site, only two of the original instruments remain. Both were installed in 1874 to observe the transit of Venus. One is an 8-inch (20 cm) refracting telescope by Troughton and Simms of London, and the other is a fully restored 4-inch (10 cm) Photoheliograph by Dallmeyer of London. The Photoheliograph is privately owned and on indefinite loan to the Astronomical Society of Victoria. The building which was used by the 13-inch (330 mm) astrograph telescope for the "Carte du Ciel" survey now houses a 12-inch (300 mm) Newtonian reflector telescope owned by the Astronomical Society of Victoria.

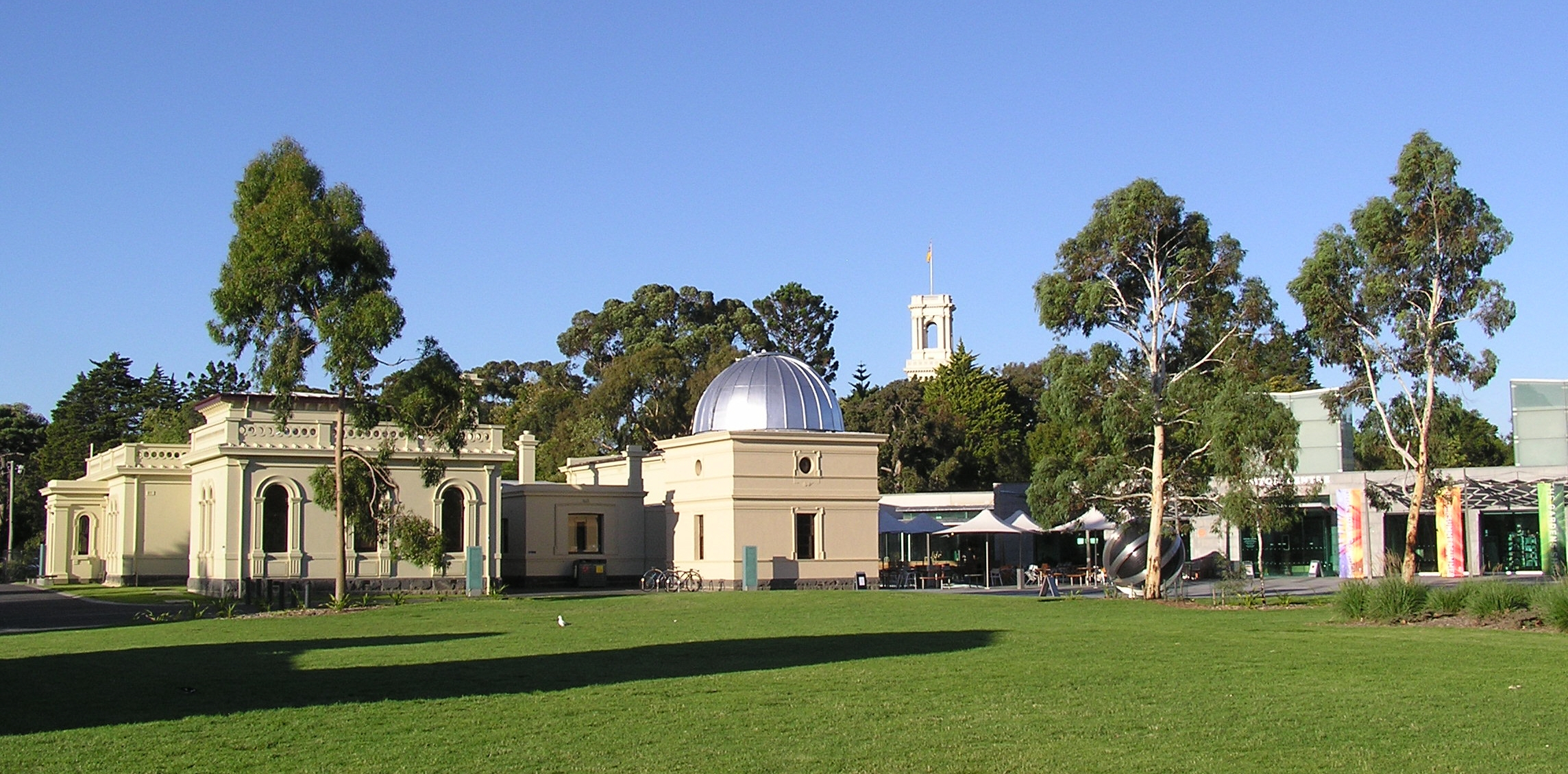
Melbourne Observatory Building & Astrograph House

The Great Melbourne Telescope was eventually moved to the Mount Stromlo Observatory where it was badly damaged in the 2003 Canberra bushfires, and a project is underway to restore the telescope to working order so that it may be used for educational and public viewing in its original home at the Melbourne Observatory. This is a joint undertaking of Museum Victoria, the Astronomical Society of Victoria and the Royal Botanic Gardens. The restoration project will incorporate bringing the telescope's optical, mechanical and electrical systems into line with current best practice. After more than five years weighing up different proposals, engineering work commenced in late 2013 thanks to a $70,000 grant from the Copland Foundation.

== See also ==
- List of astronomical observatories
- List of telescopes of Australia
