= Astronomical Society of Victoria =

Amateur astronomy club in the state of Victoria, Australia

- Abbreviation: ASV
- Formation: 1922
- Legal status: non-profit Incorporated association
- Location(s): GPO Box 1059, Melbourne Vic 3001 Australia
- Region served: Victoria, Australia
- Members: over 1000 people
- President: Mark Iscaro
- Publication: Crux
- Website: www.asv.org.au

The Astronomical Society of Victoria (ASV) is an amateur astronomy club in the state of Victoria, Australia. It was founded in 1922, making it one of the oldest such clubs in the country, and with some 1500 members it claims to be one of the largest amateur astronomy organisations in the southern hemisphere. Membership is open to all with an interest in astronomy, and the society caters for people with a wide range of ages, backgrounds, abilities and interests.

The society has sections dedicated to providing support for members interested in specific aspects of astronomy, including astro-photography, comets, radio astronomy, solar observing, variable stars, and deep sky observing. It owns and runs the Leon Mow (/ˈliːɒn ˈmaʊ/) Dark Sky Site, located north of Melbourne. Its major project is the restoration of the Great Melbourne Telescope.

== Structure and Purpose ==
The ASV is registered under the Associations Incorporation Reform Act 2012, and its operations are governed by its Constitution. Members elect the Committee of the society at each Annual General Meeting, and that Committee is then responsible to appoint officers, and control and manage the business and affairs of the society.

The Society's purposes are stated in its constitution as follows:

1. To educate the public in the science of astronomy, disseminate astronomical knowledge, and encourage the observation of the Universe.
2. To bring into closer association persons engaged in astronomy to co-ordinate and assist their activities.
3. To provide facilities to support members of the society in the practice and study of astronomy, including astronomical research.
4. To collaborate actively with other institutions and groups, to the benefit of the society's activities and of astronomy in Victoria.
5. To pursue any arrangements and activities conducive to the above purposes.

== Activities ==
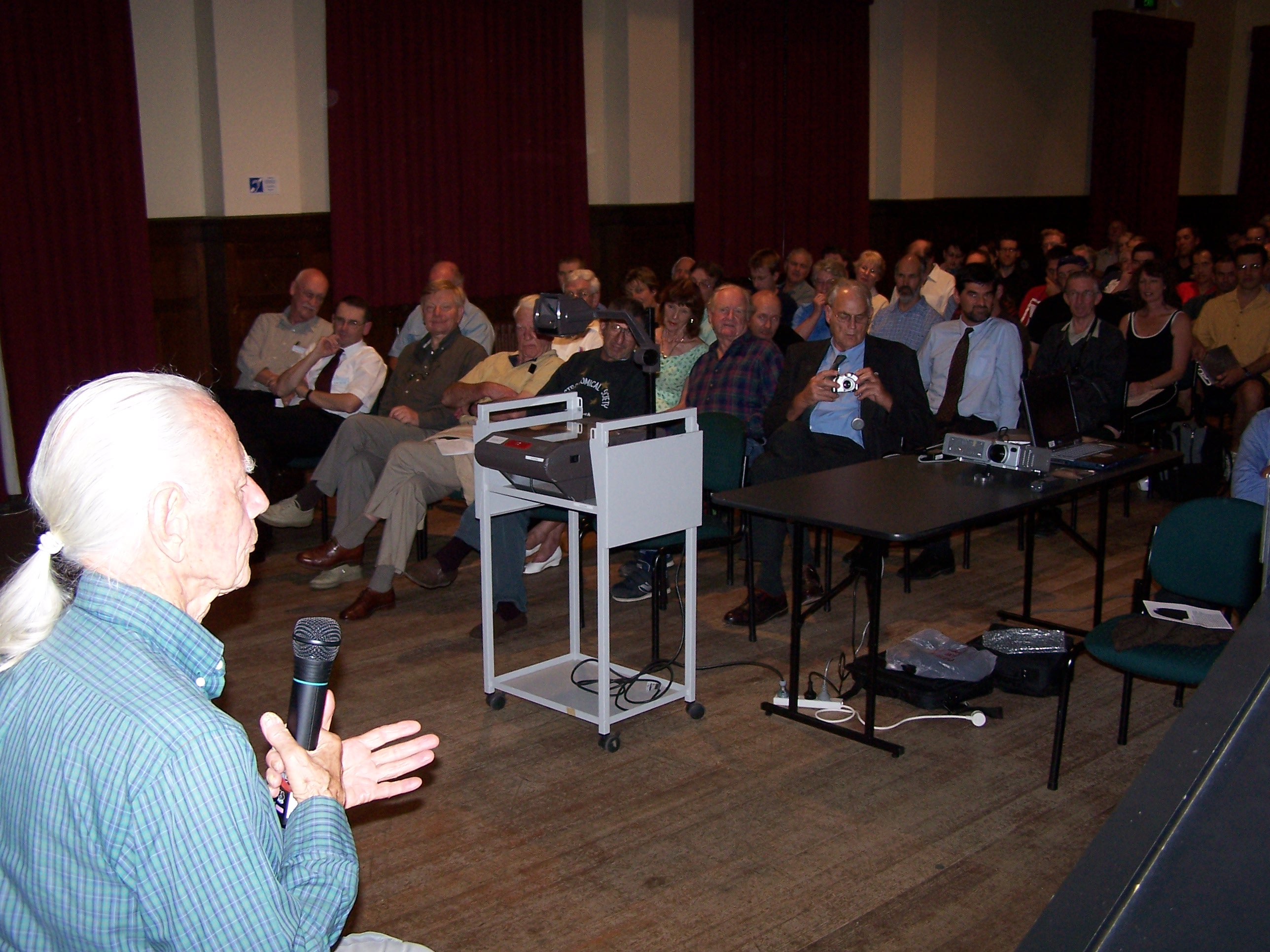
John Dobson addressing a meeting of the ASV

=== Meetings ===
- The society members get together each week for different activities at a suburban location; these are scheduled in the society's Calendar.
- The society's Monthly Meetings are held in the historical Herbarium, near the Melbourne Observatory. As well as being a social opportunity for members to keep in touch with one another, each meeting usually features a guest speaker who is a professional astronomer, an academic or a specialist discussing leading-edge technology and developments in astronomy and related fields.
- Individual sections within the society also hold their own meetings; schedules are set according to the level of member interest at the time.
- The society runs beginners' introductory training as required.
- The Age reported that they also run a course "for people who have been given telescopes for Christmas ... and not knowing where to start".

=== Observing sessions ===
The society hosts several different types of observing sessions, aimed at different audiences, including:

- Regular observing is scheduled each month at both of the society's observing sites: the Leon Mow Dark Sky Site, located north of Melbourne, and at the Melbourne Observatory.
- Society members conduct Astronomy for the People gatherings throughout the year, bringing their telescopes to Melbourne's parks and schools in order to give more people the opportunity to experience astronomy for themselves. This directly supports the society's first stated purpose, "to educate the public in the science of astronomy, disseminate astronomical knowledge, and encourage the observation of the Universe".

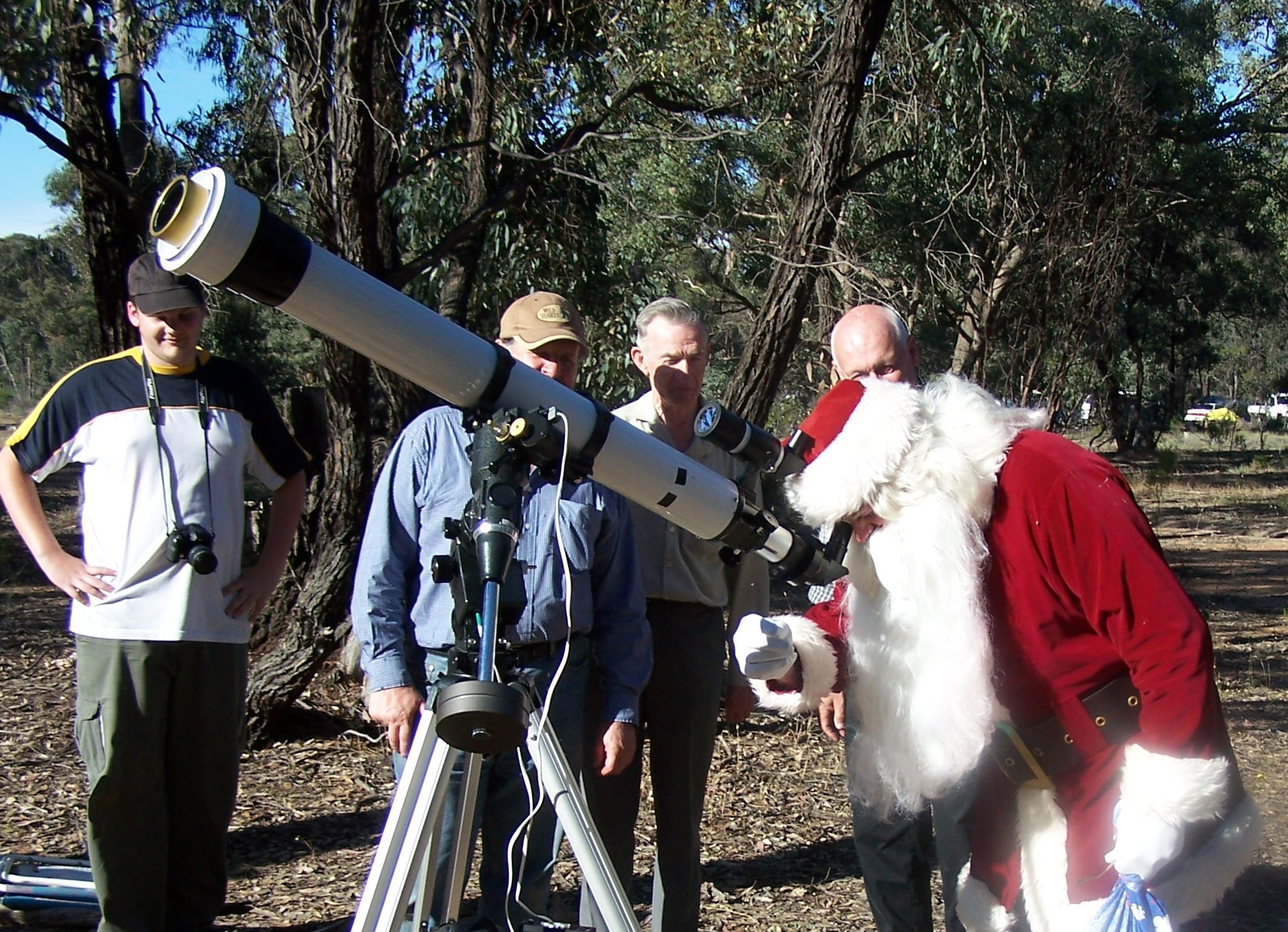
A visitor enjoying safe solar viewing at the Star-Be-Cue

- The society hosts at least two major viewing events for the general public each year at the Leon Mow Dark Sky Site: the Messier Star Party (usually held in early March since 2000) focuses on the best galaxies, nebulae and clusters collated by 18th-century French astronomer Charles Messier, and the Star-Be-Cue in early December, which the society believes is the longest running star party of its kind in Australia. The Star-Be-Cue was described in The Age newspaper as the "opportunity to experience spectacular views of the night sky with the naked eye and at the eyepiece of some of the largest telescopes in Victoria."

These are all-day events. During the days, there are astronomical talks, tours of the site, wine tasting, trivia, prizes and food provided by the Lions Club. Some observers whose equipment is suitable for solar viewing host viewing of the Sun. Once darkness falls, the focus is on observing the night sky and one of the most popular attractions at each of the star parties is a guided tour of the sky with a green laser pointer showing all the major stars, constellations, planets and positions of best deep sky objects. It is not unusual to have a crowd of 200–300 people sitting around the person with the laser pointer watching this "Sky for the Night" presentation.

- The Galactic Centre Star Party is a members-only event, held over a weekend each September.

=== Great Melbourne Telescope Restoration ===
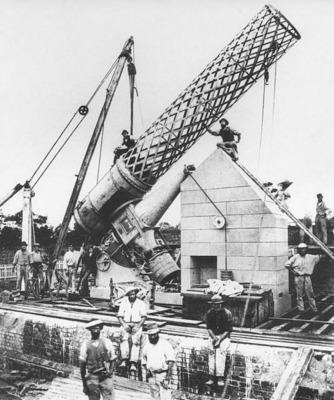
The Great Melbourne Telescope being built in 1869 after it was shipped in pieces from the works of Howard Grubb, Dublin.

For over 50 years the ASV has conducted tours and played a major role in the care of the Melbourne Observatory, adjacent to the Royal Botanic Gardens. This has now been supplemented with the Great Melbourne Telescope (GMT) Restoration Project, working closely with Museums Victoria and Royal Botanic Gardens to restore the telescope to working order so that it may be used for education and public viewing.

The telescope itself has great historical significance; at 48 inches (120 cm) it was the largest fully steerable telescope in the world when it was built in 1869, and it was the first telescope that large to be placed on an equatorial mounting, enabling it to track the stars accurately as they appeared to move across the sky. It was "hailed as a masterpiece of engineering", requiring only one assistant to control its movement. Even the rival Sydney Observatory referred to it as "one of the most important artefacts in the history of Australian science."

The telescope was upgraded by adding photographic equipment in 1872, moved to Mount Stromlo Observatory near Canberra in 1946, and rebuilt with a modern mirror in the late 1950s. As recently as 1993, it was upgraded again to take part in the world's first observations of MACHOs as evidence for the existence of dark matter. It was badly damaged in the 2003 Canberra bushfires – the temperatures were so high that the aluminium dome itself caught fire and melted onto the telescope, the Pyrex mirror shattered, and steel struts sagged.

In 2008, Museums Victoria brought the telescope's remains to Melbourne and began assembling expert volunteers. In mid 2009 a group of volunteers from the ASV began "Project Phoenix" to restore the telescope. The restoration project has required a worldwide scavenger hunt to find suitable parts. The project will incorporate bringing the telescope's optical, mechanical and electrical systems into line with current best practice.

After nearly five years weighing up different proposals, engineering work commenced in late 2013 thanks to a $70,000 grant from the Copland Foundation. The Victorian government later committed $600,000 for the first stage of the restoration, and private benefactors also provided financial support. Computer models were developed to design the supporting frame under a variety of extraordinary load conditions including wind and earthquake. The telescope-bearing frame was constructed and set up in the workshops in November 2013.

The work started with stripping and cataloguing each component, and documenting the structure in almost 1,000 engineering drawings. This identified nearly 400 components which were missing or destroyed and had to be made bespoke. In November 2019, the main structure of the telescope was reassembled for the first time in 74 years.

=== The Radio Astronomy Dish Antenna ===
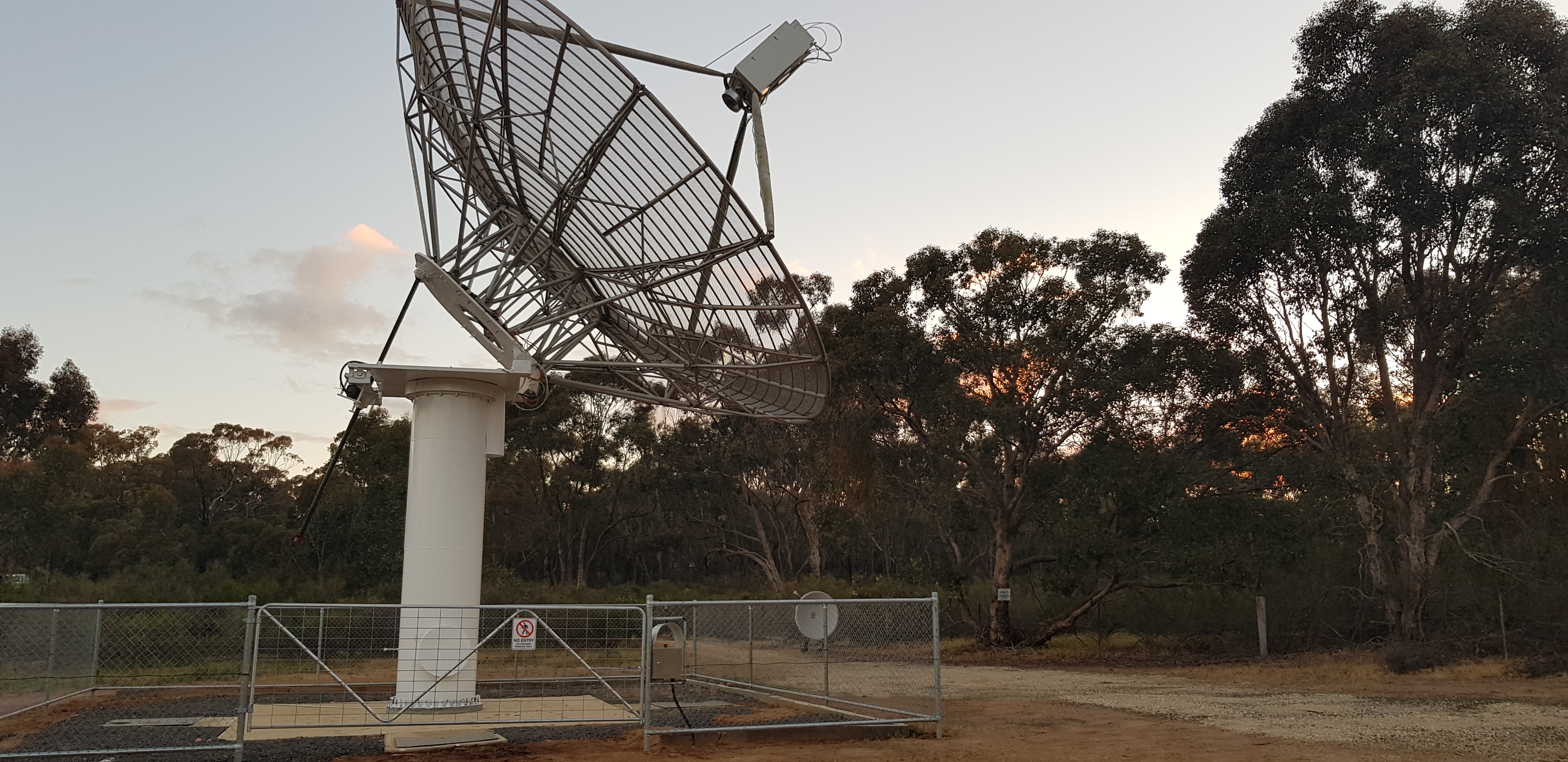
Radio Astronomy section 8.5 metre antenna

The Radio Astronomy section started in 1980 and it has been steadily evolving into an active group of people interested in detecting that part of the electromagnetic spectrum that is invisible to the human eye. In 2013 the ASV acquired an 8.5 metre (28 ft) dish antenna. Two years later saw the dish assembled and placed on top of a 5 metre support structure. It is fully steerable and can track any celestial object. Currently fitted with a hydrogen line receiver, astronomers are conducting research and mapping the Doppler shift in hydrogen throughout the galaxy. Observations of pulsars, quasars, and other molecular lines are planned. The dish can also be used as a transmitting antenna using the society's amateur radio license with call sign VK3EKH. It is planned to reflect a signal off the moon and to communicate with other amateur stations around the world using the moon as a passive reflector.

== Facilities ==
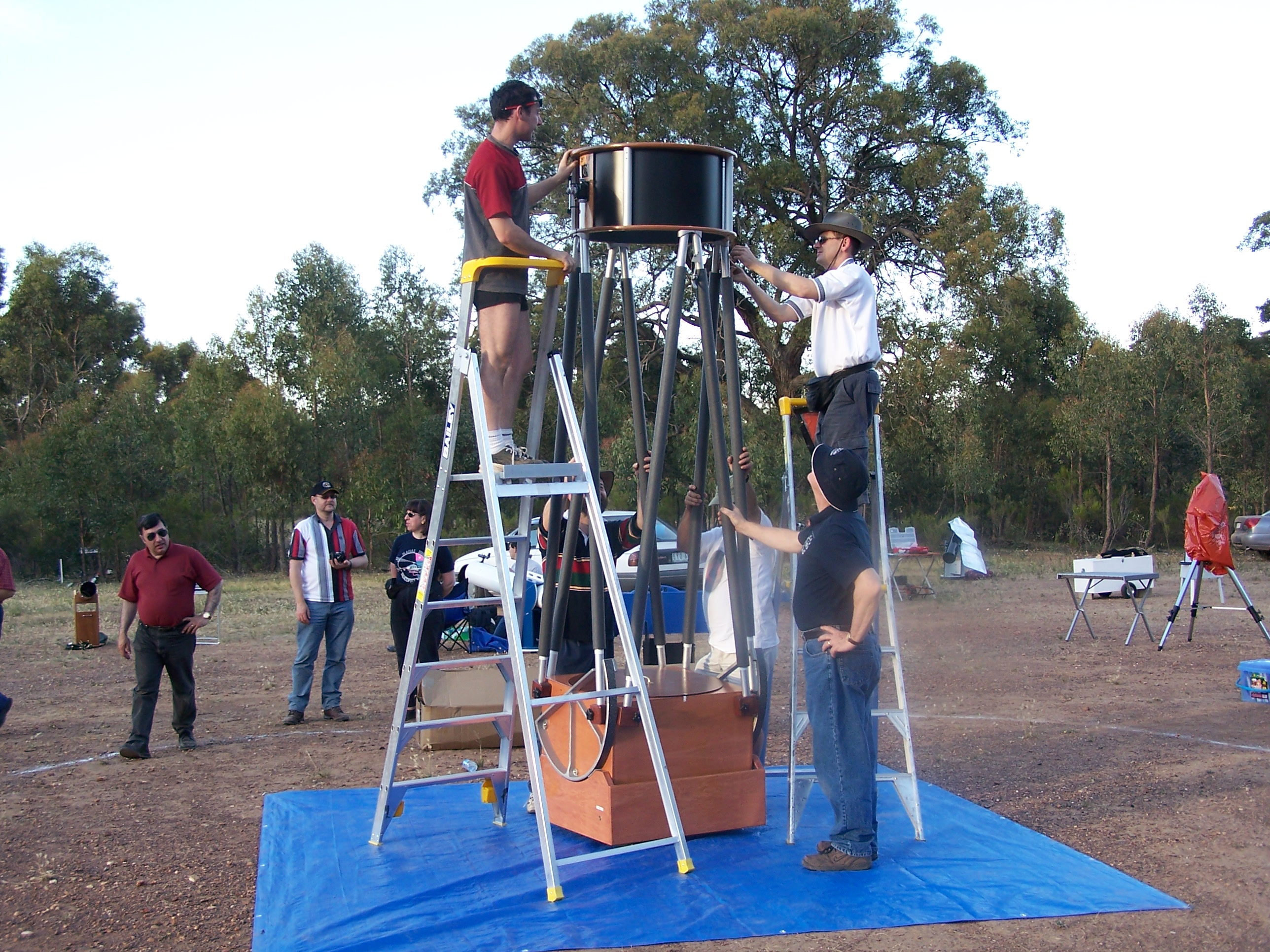
Preparing the ASV's 25-inch telescope at the Leon Mow Dark Sky Site

The society provides the following facilities for members:

- The society's library is located at the Old Melbourne Observatory, and is open during Monthly Meeting times.
- The Leon Mow Dark Sky Site, located near Heathcote some 120 kilometres north of Melbourne in country Victoria, has a pristine night sky for deep sky observing: it was described in The Age newspaper as "so dark that not only is the Milky Way clearly visible but its stars are bright enough to cast a shadow when it is overhead". The site is equipped with :
  - club rooms
  - two large observing fields – one for visual use and one dedicated to astrophotography
  - electricity in the club rooms and out on the observing fields
  - areas set aside for camping
  - clubroom with professional kitchen facilities
  - showers and toilets with hot and cold running water
- The ASV has a 40-inch telescope and 25-inch telescope at the Leon Mow Dark Sky Site. It also has a number of smaller telescopes which are available for loan to new members.

The Heathcote Observatory and Melbourne Observatory are classified as "designated" optical observatories by the Astronomical Society of Australia on the basis that they are judged to be valuable astronomical resources for research, education and community use.

=== Publications ===
- A Yearbook is supplied to members.
- Crux is the bimonthly newsletter, which all members are welcome to contribute to.
- The Journal of the Astronomical Society of Victoria (former Title = Bulletin (Astronomical Society of Victoria)) ISSN 0044-9814)
- Phoenix is the newsletter of the Great Melbourne Telescope Restoration Project.
- Regular comet and meteor shower updates are posted to members on Twitter.

== See also ==
- List of telescopes of Australia
- List of astronomical societies
