= Automated Patrol Telescope =

Charge-Coupled Device (CCD) Imaging Telescope at Australia

The Automated Patrol Telescope (APT) was a wide field CCD imaging telescope, operated by the University of New South Wales at Siding Spring Observatory, Australia. The telescope activated in June 1989.

This was one of four (4) ROTSE telescopes around the World to detect Gamma ray bursts, with telescopes positioned in Australia, Namibia, Turkey, and Texas. The telescope was designed for robotic use, with 45 cm aperture. The telescope was converted for computer controlled operation and CCD imaging from an older retired Baker-nunn camera. This is a type of modified Schmidt camera. The telescope has a field of view of 5 degrees by 5 degrees.

== See also ==
- List of telescopes of Australia
- Lists of telescopes
