= SkyMapper =

Telescope in the Siding Spring Observatory, Australia

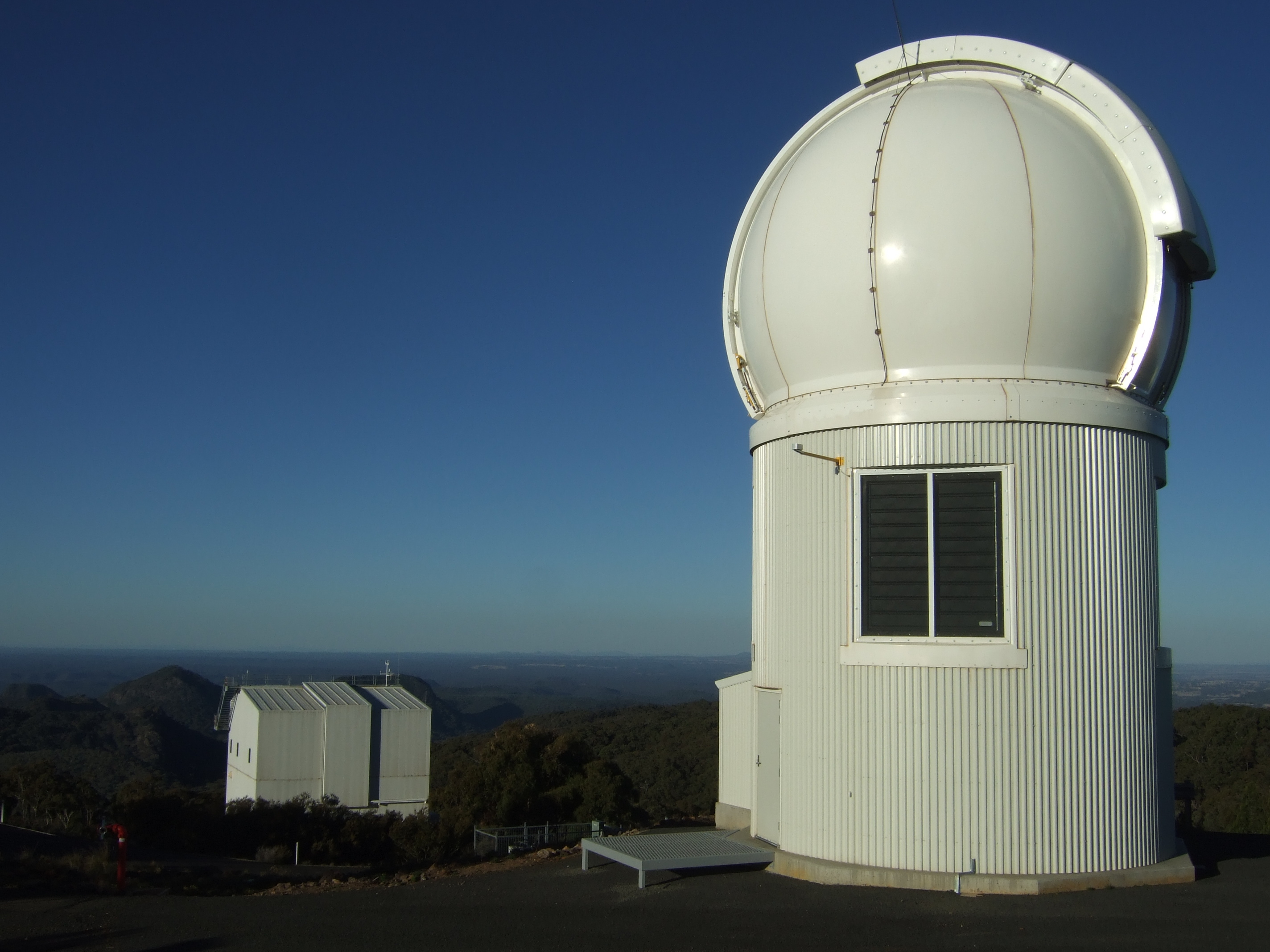
- Alternative names: SkyMapper observatory
- Location: New South Wales, AUS
- Coordinates: 31°16′20″S 149°03′41″E
- Altitude: 1,163 m (3,816 ft)
- Wavelength: 325 nm (920 THz)–969 nm (309 THz)
- Diameter: 1.35 m (4 ft 5 in)
- Secondary diameter: 0.69 m (2 ft 3 in)
- Collecting area: 1.16 m^{2} (12.5 sq ft)
- Focal length: 6.2 m (20 ft 4 in)
- Website: skymapper.anu.edu.au
- Location within Australia
- Related media on Commons

SkyMapper is a fully automated 1.35 m (4.4 ft) wide-angle optical telescope at Siding Spring Observatory in northern New South Wales, Australia. It is one of the telescopes of the Research School of Astronomy and Astrophysics of the Australian National University (ANU). The telescope has a compact modified Cassegrain design with a large 0.69 m secondary mirror, which gives it a very wide field of view: its single, dedicated instrument, a 268-million pixel imaging camera, can photograph 5.7 square degrees of sky. The camera has six light filters which span from ultraviolet to near infrared wavelengths.

The SkyMapper telescope was built to carry out the Southern Sky Survey, which will image the entire southern sky several times over in SkyMapper's six spectral filters over the course of five years. This survey will be analogous to the Sloan Digital Sky Survey of the Northern hemisphere sky. It has several enhancements, including temporal coverage, more precise measurements of stellar properties and coverage of large parts of the plane of the Galaxy.

The telescope and its camera were built by the ANU as a successor to the Great Melbourne Telescope at Mount Stromlo after that telescope was burnt in the 2003 Canberra bushfires. It was inaugurated by Minister Kim Carr and Governor of New South Wales Marie Bashir in 2009. The survey project is funded by the Australian Research Council through various grants. The project was also a finalist in The Australian's 2011 Innovation Challenge.

== Telescope ==
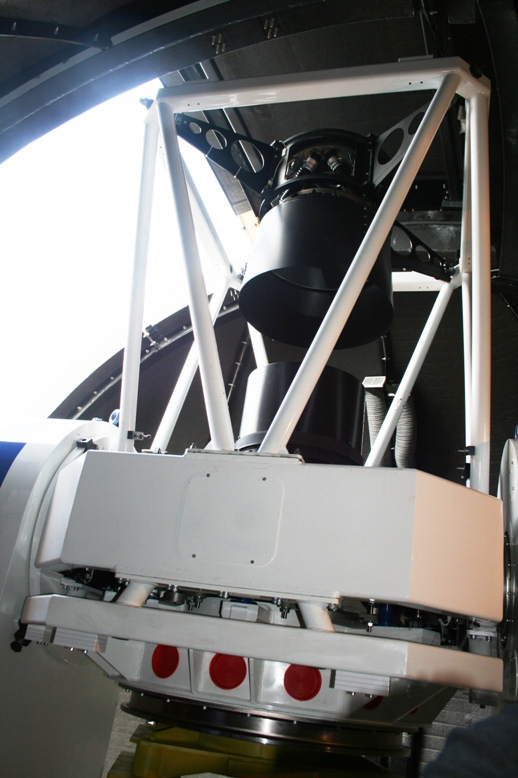
SkyMapper with the dome slit open.

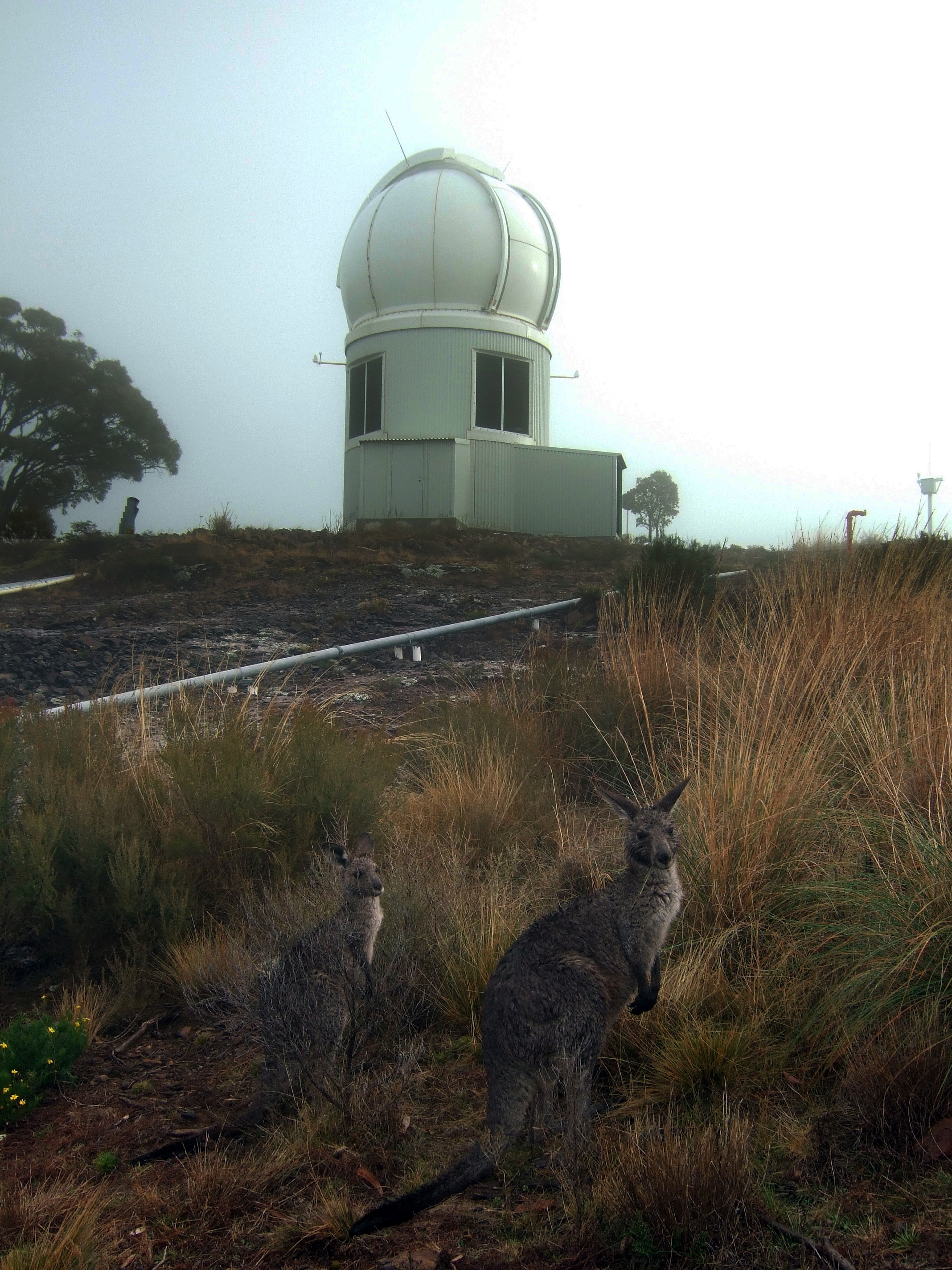
Siding Spring is within Warrumbungle National Park, and wildlife are common around the telescopes.

The telescope and its dome were built by Electro Optics Systems of Canberra. As the telescope has an alt-azimuth mounting, its dome is compact and snug: the minimum clearance as the telescope moves is about 4 cm.

== Camera and filters ==
The camera is a tiled mosaic of 32 CCD chips, each with 2k x 4k pixels, arranged in a 4 x 8 array.

The six filters used to take observations are set in a photometric system partly similar to that of the Sloan survey, to aid in comparison of the two sets of observations. These similar filters are the visible and near-infrared passbands named g, r, i and z. SkyMapper has additional, distinctive ultraviolet filters, a Strömgren system-like u, and a unique narrow v near 4000Å. These two filters bracket the Balmer jump of stars' spectra, and allow the survey to detect the population of metal-poor stars within the Milky Way.

== Data ==
The stars, galaxies and asteroids observed in the survey (expected to be about a billion) will be extracted from each image and made publicly available via an Internet query form. The main dataset of the survey will be stored and processed at the ANU supercomputing facility.

The star SMSS J031300.36-670839.3, one of the oldest known stars in the Universe, was discovered by a team led by Australian National University astronomers in early 2014.

== See also ==
- List of telescopes of Australia
