= William Parkinson Wilson =

British astronomer and professor of mathematics (1825–1874)

William Parkinson Wilson (late 1825 – 11 September 1874) was an astronomer and professor of mathematics who was born in England but spent most of his career in Australia.

== Life and career ==
William Parkinson Wilson was born in Peterborough, Northamptonshire to John Wilson, a silversmith, and his wife Elizabeth (née Parkinson). He attended Cathedral Grammar School in Peterborough and in 1843 won a scholarship to St John's College, Cambridge where he earned his BA (and was senior wrangler) in 1847. In 1849, he became First Professor of Mathematics at Queen's College, Belfast (later Queen's University Belfast). During his six years there he worked tirelessly to establish a Queens College astronomical observatory. In 1850, he published A Treatise on Dynamics (Hodges and Smith).

In 1855, he moved to Australia and, along with William Hearn, became one of the four founding professors of the University of Melbourne. He was active in the Philosophical Institute (founded in 1855) and its successor the Royal Society of Victoria. While at his earlier position in Belfast, Wilson had in 1856 advocated Melbourne as the site for a southern hemisphere observatory––long a goal of the Royal Society. In 1858, he demonstrated a model reflector for the proposed Melbourne Observatory, and lived to see it open in 1863.

He spent the rest of his life as professor of mathematics and astronomy at Melbourne. He is buried in Mornington, Victoria on 11 December 1874. He was 48 years old.
