= List of telescopes of Australia =

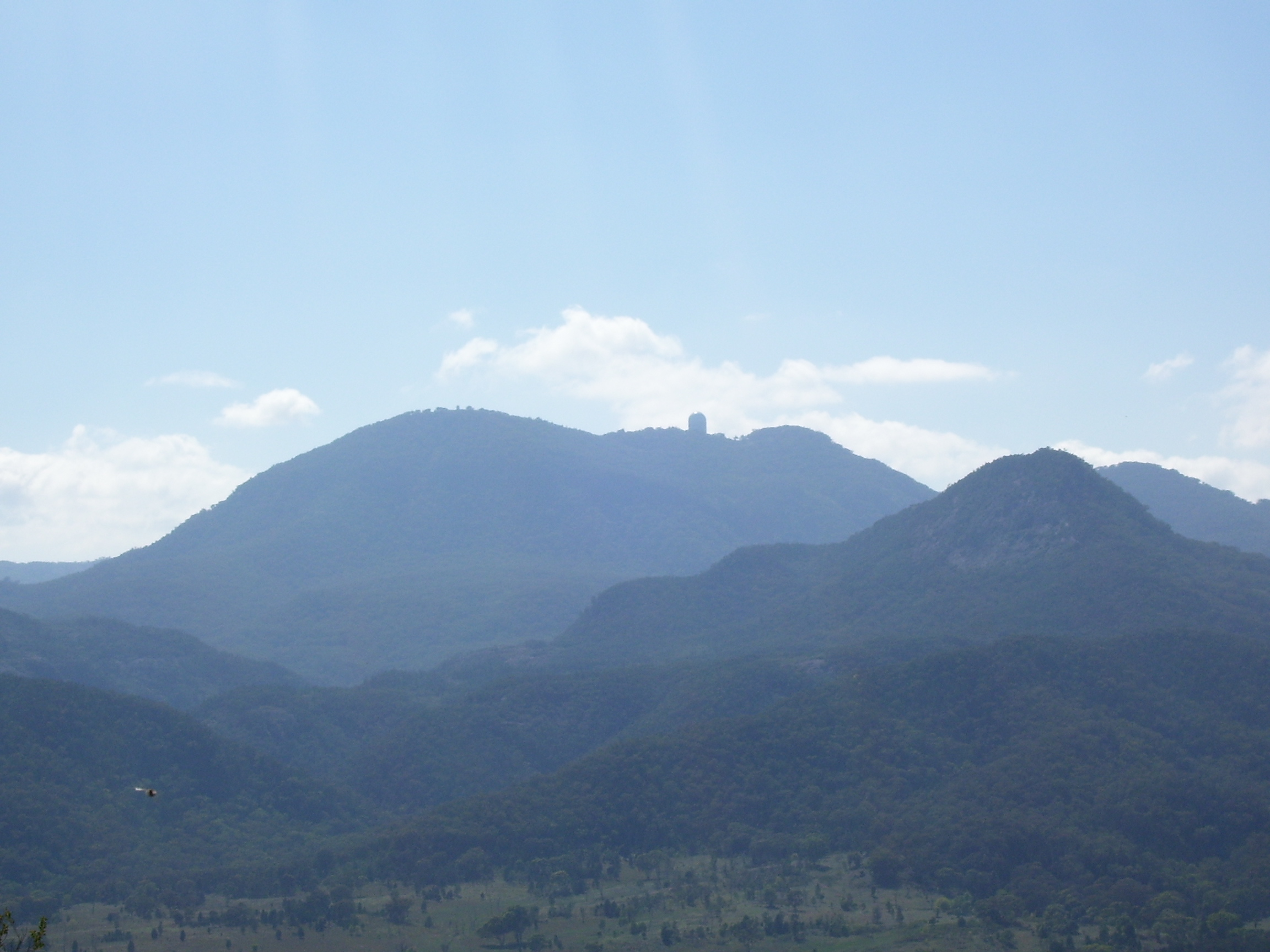
Siding Spring observatory in the distance

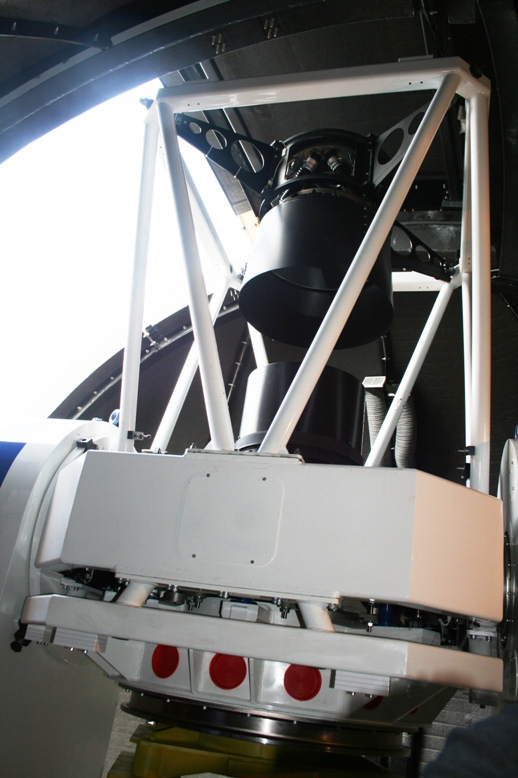
SkyMapper telescope inside its dome enclosure

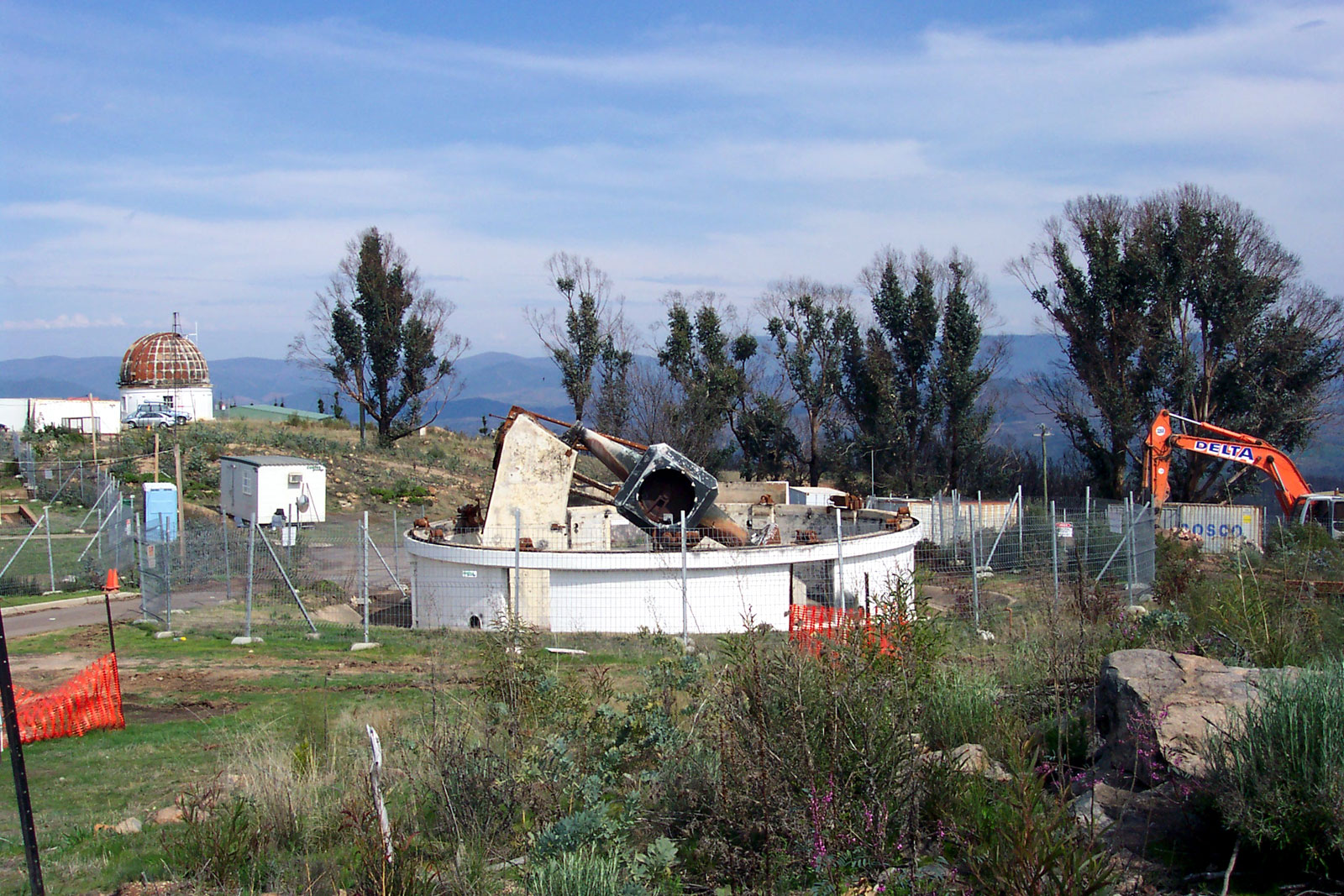
A bushfire destroyed this old telescope in 2003.

The list below is split between telescopes located in Australia, and telescopes sponsored by Australia such as a space telescope or foreign installation.

Australia can access the Southern skies, which was a popular trend in the 20th century (many telescope had been built for the northern hemisphere). The third largest optical telescope in the world in 1974 was Anglo-Australian Telescope, one of the really large telescopes of that time and built in Australia. There are several radio telescopes also, and Sydney Observatory has taken observations for over a century.

One of the largest telescopes of the 19th century was the Great Melbourne Telescope, one of the last big metal mirror reflecting telescopes before the silver-on-glass designs came to predominate; this was purchased with money from an Australian Gold boom.

== Optical telescopes ==
- Anglo-Australian Telescope (3.9 m, 1974-)
- Automated Patrol Telescope (45 cm, 1989-2008)
- Faulkes Telescope South (2 m, 2004-)
- SkyMapper (1.35 m)
- UTas H127 (1.27 m)
- Great Melbourne Telescope (48 inches/ ~1.22 m, 1868)
- Siding Spring 2.3 m Telescope (2.3 m)
- Sydney Observatory instruments
- Mt. Kent Observatory - Shared Skies (0.7 m)
- Penrith Observatory (0.6 m)
- Perth-Lowell Telescope (0.6 m)
- Mt. Kent Observatory - Shared Skies (0.5 m)
- Uppsala Southern Schmidt Telescope (0.5 m)
- Reedy Creek Observatory instruments (0.51 m)

== See also ==
- Lists of telescopes
- List of largest optical telescopes in the British Isles
- List of largest optical telescopes in the North America
