= Comet Siding Spring =

Comet Siding Spring, discoveries made at Siding Spring Observatory, may refer to:

- Periodic comets:
  - 162P/Siding Spring (P/2004 TU_{12})
  - 389P/Siding Spring (P/2006 R1)
  - 468P/Siding Spring (P/2004 V3)
  - 487P/Siding Spring (P/2012 US_{27})
  - P/2006 HR30
- Non-periodic comets:
  - C/2004 T3
  - C/2006 HW51
  - C/2007 K3
  - C/2007 Q3, which came to perihelion in 2009
  - C/2010 A4
  - C/2012 OP
  - C/2013 A1, which made a close approach to Mars on 19 Oct 2014
