= ANU 2.3 m Telescope =

Australian telescope

ANU 2.3m Telescope
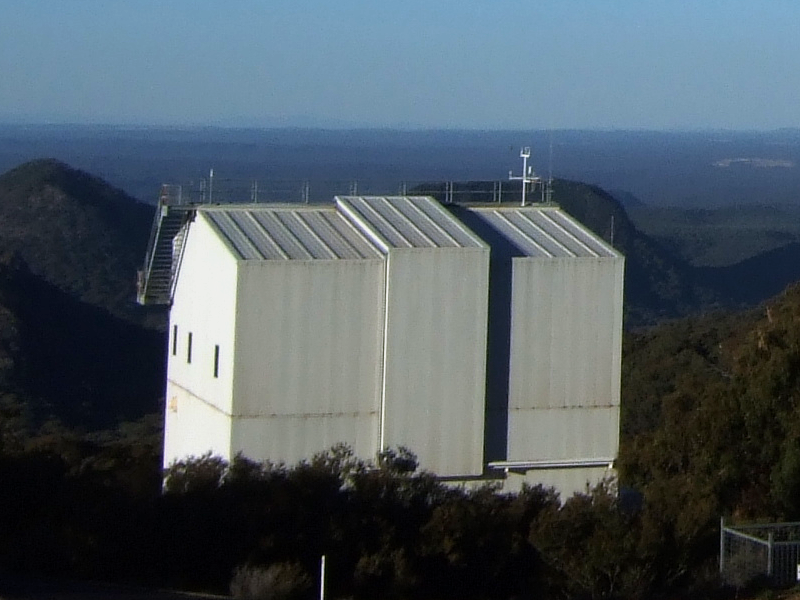
- Alternative names: Advanced Technology Telescope
- Location(s): New South Wales, AUS
- Coordinates: 31°16′18″S 149°03′44″E
- Organization: Australian National University
- Altitude: 1,165 m
- Diameter: 2.3 m
- Secondary diameter: 0.3 m
- Focal length: f/2.05
- Mounting: Altazimuth mount
- Enclosure: Co-rotating
- Location of ANU 2.3m Telescope
- Related media on Commons

The ANU 2.3 metre telescope is an optical telescope situated at Siding Spring Observatory, and operated by the Australian National University's Research School of Astronomy and Astrophysics (RSAA). The telescope was constructed during the early 1980s and featured, at the time, bold features and design: an unusually thin mirror, an altazimuth mount, and a co-rotating building.

== History ==
The telescope was the initiative of Don Mathewson, the then-director of the observatory. It was inaugurated by the Prime Minister, Bob Hawke, on 16 May 1984, and was regarded as an achievement in high technology for Australia. In 1985, it won an award from the Institution of Engineers. In early 2023 the telescope was automated, enabling it to instantly respond to alerts from other facilities. In particular, the automated telescope is well suited for studying time-varying sources such as supernovae, gamma-ray bursts, and gravitational wave sources.

== Mirror ==
The telescope's mirror is unusually thin, with a diameter-to-thickness ratio of about 20:1. The light mirror and rotating design allow the telescope to be rapidly moved as observations are made.

== Instruments and Programs ==
The telescope's current instrument in the Wide-Field Spectrograph (WiFeS), an integral field spectrograph designed and built at the RSAA, and installed on the 2.3m telescope in 2009. Previous instruments have included the Cryogenic Array Spectrometer/Imager (CASPIR), the Dual-Beam Spectrograph (DBS), an echelle spectrograph, and an imaging camera.

The 2.3m telescope is regularly used by students from ANU and other universities, enabling students to gain experience working with large scientific telescopes. The telescope also regularly performs follow-up observations on objects of interest identified by other detectors. The telescope has been involved in a number of large survey programs, including the Dark Energy Bedrock All Sky Survey (DEBass), a survey of over 500 type Ia supernovae.

== See also ==
- List of large optical telescopes
- List of largest optical telescopes in the 20th century
