= Siding Spring Observatory =

Astronomic observatory in New South Wales, Australia

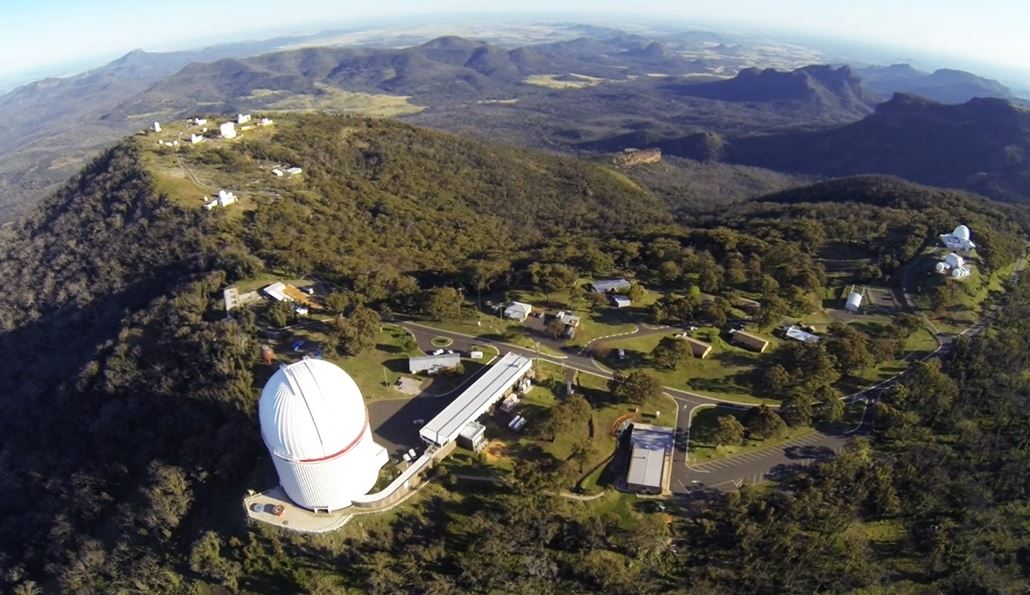
- Siding Spring Mountain with Anglo-Australian Telescope dome visible near centre of image.
- Alternative names: sso
- Organization: Research School of Astronomy & Astrophysics at the Australian National University
- Observatory code: 413
- Location: Siding Spring Mountain/Mount Woorat, near Coonabarabran, New South Wales, Australia
- Coordinates: 31°16′24″S 149°03′52″E
- Altitude: 1,165 m (3,822 ft)

Telescopes
- Anglo-Australian Telescope: 3.9 m (13 ft) equatorial mount
- UK Schmidt Telescope: 1.24 m (4 ft 1 in) Schmidt camera
- Faulkes Telescope South: 2 m (6 ft 7 in) Ritchey-Chrétien telescope
- Siding Spring 2.3 m Telescope: 2.3 m (7 ft 7 in) Advanced Technology Telescope
- SkyMapper: 1.35 m (4 ft 5 in) wide-angle optical telescope
- HAT-South telescope: wide-field telescope
- Solaris Telescope: 20 in (51 cm) Ritchey–Chrétien telescope
- Uppsala Southern Schmidt Telescope: Schmidt Telescope
- Automated Patrol Telescope: wide-field CCD imaging telescope
- iTelescope.Net Observatory: Remote Public Telescopes
- KMTNet: 2.2 m (7 ft 3 in) Korean Microlensing Telescope
- Related media on Commons

Mount Woorut
- Siding Spring Mountain
- Location within New South Wales

Highest point
- Elevation: 1,165 m (3,822 ft)
- Parent peak: Mount Exmouth
- Coordinates: 31°16′S 149°03′E

Geography
- Location: Coonabarabran, New South Wales, Australia
- Parent range: Warrumbungles

Geology
- Mountain type: Volcanic

Siding Spring Observatory near Coonabarabran, New South Wales, Australia, part of the Research School of Astronomy & Astrophysics (RSAA) at the Australian National University (ANU), incorporates the Anglo-Australian Telescope along with a collection of other telescopes owned by the Australian National University, the University of New South Wales, and other institutions. The observatory is situated 1,165 metres (3,822 ft) above sea level in the Warrumbungle National Park on Mount Woorat, also known as Siding Spring Mountain. Siding Spring Observatory is owned by the Australian National University (ANU) and is part of the Mount Stromlo and Siding Spring Observatories research school.

More than A$100 million worth of research equipment is located at the observatory. There are over 60 telescopes on site, though not all are operational.

== History ==
The original Mount Stromlo Observatory was set up by the Commonwealth Government in 1924. After duty supplying optical components to the military in World War II, the emphasis on astronomical research changed in the late 1940s from solar to stellar research.

Already in the 1950s, the artificial lights of Canberra, ACT, had brightened the sky at Mount Stromlo to such an extent that many faint astronomical objects had been overwhelmed by light pollution. The search for a new site was initiated by Bart Bok. After a site survey was undertaken the number of possible locations was narrowed down to two – Siding Spring and Mount Bingar near Griffith, also in New South Wales.

The Siding Spring site was selected by the ANU in 1962 from many other possible locations because of the dark and cloud-free skies. The first telescope built there was a 40 inches (100 cm) Boller and Chivens telescope which was designed for photography and photoelectric work. The first images taken with this telescope were by Ben Gascoigne on 12 February 1969. This telescope was also used in research by Bart and Priscilla Bok into the structure of the Milky Way and Magellanic Clouds. Throughout the 1960s more Boller and Chivens telescopes were added to the site.

Since the 1950s, and quite independently of developments at Siding Spring, the Australian and British governments had been negotiating about the construction of a very large telescope. When these negotiations finally came to fruition in 1969, the infrastructure of Siding Spring Observatory was already in place, and it was the obvious site at which to locate the 3.9-metre (13 ft) aperture Anglo-Australian Telescope (AAT) which was completed in 1974.

During its construction in the early 1970s, the British Science Research Council also built the UK Schmidt Telescope, 1 kilometre (0.62 mi) to the northeast of the AAT dome. The considerably wider field of view of the Schmidt optical design complements the narrower field of the AAT, in that larger areas of sky may be surveyed more quickly. Interesting objects so discovered are then studied in greater detail on the larger instrument. In 1987, the Schmidt Telescope was amalgamated with the AAT.

In 1984, the Prime Minister, Bob Hawke, opened the ANU's largest telescope, the low-cost and innovative 2.3-metre (7 ft 7 in) aperture telescope, known as the Advanced Technology Telescope, which was housed in a simple, co-rotating cuboid dome.

Siding Spring Observatory also houses telescopes from institutions across the world including, Korea, America, the UK, Poland, Hungary, Germany and Russia. In 1990, the earth-satellite tracking facility of the Royal Greenwich Observatory was closed down after 10 years of operation.

In 2012 the first publicly accessible Internet based observatory, working in partnership with the RSAA, was commissioned by iTelescope.Net with over 25 telescopes housed in a large roll-off roof (ROR) observatory near the base of the UK Schmidt Telescope.

Las Cumbres Observatory Global Telescope Network operate a 2-metre Ritchey Chretien telescope used for research, citizen science, and education purposes by users across the globe. Also, they operate inside the clam style dome 2 x 0.40 m telescopes, and a further 2 × 1 metre telescopes housed in individual domes outside the building.

ROTSE, Robotic Optical Transient Search Experiment is operated by the University of New South Wales (UNSW), the 0.45 m, 3rd-generation robotic telescope has successfully detected the transient optical emission from several GRB events. The wide field of view and the fast response permit measurements inaccessible to more conventional instruments.

HAT-South is a project to search for transiting extrasolar planets in the Southern Hemisphere. It uses a network of wide-field telescopes to monitor hundreds of thousands of bright stars, searching for the characteristic dip in light that occurs when a planet passes in front of its host star. Hat – South is made up of 3 sites in the Southern hemisphere with two "TH4" units, making that 8 x 0.2-metre telescopes each at every sites. These TH4 units consist of four 0.18 m Takahashi astrographs fitted with Apogee 4k x 4k CCDs. Each TH4 unit monitors 64 square degrees of sky at a time, so each site is capable of monitoring 128 square degrees of sky.

Automated Patrol Telescope (APT), operated by the University of New South Wales (UNSW), is a wide-field CCD imaging telescope. The 0.5 m telescope has a 5-degree field of view and can be operated remotely or in a fully automatic mode. The telescope has an optical design that more resembles that of a Schmidt camera, but has a 3-element lens to achieve a wide, corrected field of view. The APT was developed by extensively modifying the optical, mechanical and electronic systems of a Baker-Nunn satellite tracking instrument. The Baker-Nunn telescope had been located at Woomera in South Australia during the 1960s, and afterward was stationed at Orroral Valley near Canberra. The camera was donated by the Smithsonian Institution to UNSW in 1982.

PROMPT (also known as Skynet) is run by the University of North Carolina. The Panchromatic Robotic Optical Monitoring and Polarimetry Telescopes is made up of 4 x 0.41 Ritchey Chretien telescopes is entirely robotic and queue based. They are able to have rapid and simultaneous multi-wavelength observations of gamma ray burst afterglows and other transient objects.

Uppsala Schmidt Telescope was built in 1957 originally located in Sweden, relocated to Mount Stromlo, then finally in 1982 making a home at Siding Spring Observatory. The telescope was used by ANU in many roles such as Near Earth Object studies (NEOs) by famous comet hunter Rob McNaught. It was also the southern hemisphere counterpart of the Catalina Sky Survey (CSS) located in Arizona, USA. The telescope is a 0.5m spherical mirror, with a 0.5m correcting plate, which allows a 6 degree field of view.

The KMT, Korean Microlensing Telescope, is a 1.6 m operated by KASI. The KMTNet aims primarily to discover extrasolar planets based on the analyses of gravitational microlensing phenomena, especially the detection of earth-mass planets in the habitable zone. The KMTNet system has a very competitive power for wide-field photometric survey sciences that study supernovae, asteroids and external galaxies, for instance. Because the observation period of the Galactic bulge focuses on the primary science on extrasolar planets, the other science programs are performed in the season when the Galactic bulge is not observable.

The SkyMapper telescope, operated by the Australian National University, is currently mapping the entire southern sky, completing each map over a period of 3 months. The survey will record more than a billion stars and galaxies. This fully automated telescope also uses a series of filters enabling the camera to record the spectral type of stars, giving astronomers information about their age, mass and temperature. The 1.35m telescope has been used in the hunt for Planet Nine and more trans-Neptunian objects, supernovae, and also finding the oldest known star in the universe.

Solaris 3, operated by the Nicolaus Copernicus Astronomical Center of the Polish Academy of Sciences as part of a network across the Southern hemisphere, is a single 0.5-metre telescope, using a new method referred to as eclipse timing to search for exoplanets. They have also added an astrograph to their telescope, giving it dual purpose.

JAXA, the Japan Aerospace Exploration Agency, operate four 0.25-metre telescopes, searching and tracking space debris and near-Earth objects in the Southern hemisphere.

Huntsman Telephoto Array is operated by the Australian Astronomical Observatory & Macquarie University to take images of faint galaxy structures using commercial lenses. Initially it will use a 0.28-metre Celestron Rowe-Ackermann Schmidt Astrograph (RASA) telescope with seven 400 mm Canon f/2.8 camera lenses.

bRing-AU, operated by a collaboration of Universities and astronomers will search for circumplanetary material, studying disks of dust in early history and the formation of icy satellites. They use 2 small modified cameras, with Kodak CCD chips.

=== 2013 Bushfire ===
On 13 January 2013 the facility was threatened by a huge bushfire and firestorm. Eighteen staff were evacuated to Coonabarabran. Three buildings were destroyed: 'The Lodge' accommodation used by visiting researchers, the Director's Cottage and the Fire Station. Bushfire prevention measures had been implemented and were credited with the protection of the telescopes. Though smoke, ash and other air-borne debris entered some domes, all telescopes survived the inferno. The first telescopes back in action were those of the iTelescope Remote Observatory on 20 January. The Anglo-Australian Telescope resumed normal operations in mid-February 2013.

== Visitors ==
There is a visitors' gallery and exhibition area open to the public which also incorporates a café and souvenir shop. During NSW school holidays, guided tours of the site are offered. Groups of over 15 adults may apply for behind the scenes walking or bus tours.

An Open Day is held annually in October, offering talks about astronomy and tours inside many of the telescope domes which are open to the public on this one day of the year. These tours include the AAT 3.9M, UK Schmidt, iTelescope.Net, 2.3M ANU and the LCGTN 2M telescope facilities.

== Telescopes ==
- 3.9 m (13 ft) Anglo-Australian Telescope (AAO), operational in 1974
- 1.24 m (4 ft 1 in) UK Schmidt Telescope (AAO)
- 2 m (6 ft 7 in) Faulkes Telescope South (Las Cumbres Observatory)
- 1.3 m (4 ft 3 in) SkyMapper Telescope (ANU), when launched in 2009 was the first new optical, research grade telescope in Australia since 1984.
- 2.3 m (7 ft 7 in) Advanced Technology Telescope (ANU), was built in 1984
- Multiple – iTelescope.Net (iTelescope Network), Internet connected remote telescopes for the Public. Built 2013
- 4 x 0.4 m (1 ft 4 in) PROMPT Telescopes (The University of North Carolina), Built 2013
- HAT-South Telescope Network (ANU, Center for Astrophysics | Harvard & Smithsonian, Max Planck Institute for Astronomy) with 8 x 0.2 m telescopes
- SOLARIS Telescope (Nicolaus Copernicus Astronomical Centre – Poland. Built 2012)
- 0.5 m (1 ft 8 in) Uppsala Southern Schmidt Telescope (ANU – decommissioned 2013)
- 0.5 m (1 ft 8 in) Automated Patrol Telescope (UNSW – decommissioned 2012)
- 0.45 m (1 ft 6 in) ROTSE IIIa, Robotic Optical Transit Search Experiment (UNSW)
- Jaxa (Japan Aerospace Exploration Agency) telescopes
- 40 in (100 cm) Telescope (ANU), was first commissioned in 1963 currently decommissioned and moved to Milroy Observatory for use by amateurs.
- 24 in (61 cm) Telescope (ANU – decommissioned)
- 16 in (41 cm) Telescope (ANU currently housing a 14-inch telescope for outreach programs)
- 1.6 m (5 ft 3 in) Korea Microlensing Telescope Network (KMTNet)
- Two 8 x 0.4 m (1 ft 4 in) Gravitational-wave Optical Transient Observer array telescopes (GOTO-S), built 2023

== Observing programs ==
The Anglo-Australian Near-Earth Asteroid Survey used the UK Schmidt Telescope between 1990 and 1996. The same telescope was later dedicated for use by the RAVE survey of the Milky Way. The Near-Earth object search program called the Siding Spring Survey (closed 2013) used the Uppsala Southern Schmidt Telescope. The 2dF Galaxy Redshift Survey, one of the largest survey of galaxies ever undertaken used the Anglo-Australian Telescope between 1995 and 2002.

== Discoveries ==
1977, the Vela Pulsar was discovered at Siding Spring. Comets discovered from the observatory include Comet 103P/Hartley, discovered in 1986 by Malcolm Hartley, Comet C/2006 P1, discovered by Robert H. McNaught using the Uppsala Southern Schmidt Telescope on 8 August 2006, and Comet C/2013 A1, also discovered by McNaught, which passed extremely close to Mars on 19 October 2014.

== See also ==
- Australian Astronomical Observatory (AAO), formerly the Anglo-Australian Observatory
- Comet Siding Spring
- Mount Stromlo Observatory
- List of astronomical observatories
