= Bibliography of Nova Scotia =

The Flag of Nova Scotia

Nova Scotia is a province of Canada, located on its east coast. This bibliography compiles major written and published works concerning the province.

== Overviews ==
- Choyce, Lesley (1996). Nova Scotia: Shaped by the Sea, A Living History. Toronto: Penguin Books Canada. ISBN 978-1-9897-2515-3.
- Conrad, Margaret (2020). At the Ocean's Edge: A History of Nova Scotia to Confederation. Canada: University of Toronto Press. ISBN 978-1-4875-2395-4.
- Leinberger, Eric; Wynn, Graeme; McNutt, Mitchell A. (1994). Buckner, Phillip A.; Reid, John G. (eds.). The Atlantic Region to Confederation: A History. University of Toronto Press. ISBN 0-8020-6977-0.
- McCann, L. D.; Parenteau, Bill (1993). Forbes, E. R.; Muise, D. A. (eds.). The Atlantic Provinces in Confederation. University of Toronto Press. ISBN 0-8020-6817-0.
- Pryke, Kenneth G. (1979). Nova Scotia and Confederation, 1864-74. University of Toronto Press. ISBN 0-8020-5389-0.
- Whitelaw, William M. (1934). The Maritimes and Canada before Confederation. Oxford University Press. LCCN 34025363.

== Culture ==
- Conrad, Margaret (1991). Making Adjustments: Change and Continuity in Planter Nova Scotia, 1759-1800. Fredericton, N.B.: Acadiensis Press. ISBN 978-0-9191-0733-5.
- Conrad, Margaret (1995). Intimate Relations: Family and Community in Planter Nova Scotia, 1759-1800. Fredericton, N.B.: Acadiensis Press. ISBN 978-0-9191-0742-7.
- Conrad, Margaret; Moody, Barry (2001). Planter Links: Community and Culture in Colonial Nova Scotia. Fredericton, N.B.: Acadiensis Press. ISBN 978-0-9191-0746-5.
- Creighton, Helen (1968). Bluenose Magic. Halifax, N.S.: Nimbus Publishing. ISBN 978-1-7710-8260-0.
- Johnston, A. J. B. (1996). Life and Religion at Louisbourg, 1713-1758. Montreal & Kingston: McGill-Queens University Press. ISBN 0-7735-1525-9.
- March, William DesB (1986). Red Line: The Chronicle-Herald and Mail-Star, 1875-1954. Halifax, N.S.: Chebucto Agencies. ISBN 978-0-9691-7951-1.
- McBurney, Margaret; Byers, Mary (1994). Atlantic Hearth: Early Homes and Families of Nova Scotia. Toronto, ON: University of Toronto Press. ISBN 978-0-8020-7762-2.
- McKay, Ian (1985). The Craft Transformed: An Essay on the Carpenters of Halifax, 1885-1985. Halifax, N.S.: Halifax Holdfast Press. ISBN 978-0-9692-1170-9.
- McKay, Ian (1994). The Quest of the Folk: Antimodernism and Cultural Selection in Twentieth-Century Nova Scotia. McGill-Queens University Press. ISBN 978-0-7735-6468-8.
- Morton, Suzanne (1995). Ideal Surroundings: Domestic Life in a Working-Class Suburb in the 1920s. Toronto: University of Toronto Press. ISBN 978-0-8020-0474-1.

== Economy ==
- Frost, James D. (2003). Merchant Princes: Halifax's First Family of Finance, Ships, and Steel. Toronto: Lorimer. ISBN 978-1-5502-8803-2.
- Graham, John F. (1963). Fiscal Adjustment and Economic Development: A Case Study of Nova Scotia. University of Toronto Press. ISBN 978-1-4875-9779-5. JSTOR 10.3138/j.ctt1v2xwbd.
- Gwyn, Julian (1998). Excessive Expectations: Maritime Commerce and the Economic Development of Nova Scotia, 1740-1870. McGill-Queen's University Press. ISBN 978-0-7735-1548-2.
- Meek, Jim; Beaton, Eleanor (2010). Offshore Dream: A History of Nova Scotia's Oil and Gas Industry. Halifax, N.S.: Nimbus Publishing. ISBN 978-1-5510-9787-9.

== Geography and toponymy ==
- Brown, Thomas J. (1922). Place-Names of the Province of Nova Scotia . Royal Print & Litho. ISBN 978-0-8881-2143-1.
- Fergusson, C. Bruce (1967). Place-Names and Places of Nova Scotia. Public Archives of Nova Scotia.
- Hornsby, Stephen J. (1992). Nineteenth-Century Cape Breton: A Historical Geography. Montreal & Kingston: McGill-Queen's University Press. ISBN 978-0-7735-0889-7.

== Government and politics ==
- Beck, J. Murray (1957). The Government of Nova Scotia. Canada: University of Toronto Press. ISBN 978-1-4426-3343-8.
- Beck, J. Murray (1985). Politics of Nova Scotia: Volume One: Nicholson-Fielding, 1710-1896. Tantallon, N.S.: Four East Publications. ISBN 978-0-9204-2729-3.
- Beck, J. Murray (1985). Politics of Nova Scotia: Volume Two, 1896-1988. Tantallon, N.S.: Four East Publications. ISBN 978-0-9204-2704-0.
- Bickerton, James P. (1990). Nova Scotia, Ottawa and the Politics of Regional Development. Toronto, ON: University of Toronto Press. ISBN 978-0-8020-6745-6.
- Cuthbertson, Brian (1994). Johnny Bluenose at the Polls: Epic Nova Scotian Election Battles, 1758-1848. Formac Publishing Company. ISBN 978-0-8878-0294-2.
- Elliott, Shirley B. (1984). The Legislative Assembly of Nova Scotia, 1758–1983: A Biographical Directory. Halifax, N.S.: Public Archives of Nova Scotia. ISBN 978-0-8887-1050-5.
- Girard, Philip; Phillips, Jim; Cahill, Barry (2004). The Supreme Court of Nova Scotia, 1754-2004: From Imperial Bastion to Provincial Oracle. Toronto, ON: University of Toronto Press. ISBN 978-0-8020-8021-9.
- Mancke, Elizabeth (2005). The Fault Lines of Empire: Political Differentiation in Massachusetts and Nova Scotia, ca. 1760-1830. Routledge. ISBN 978-0-4159-5000-8.

=== Premiers ===
- Beck, J. Murray (1984). Joseph Howe Volumes I & II : Conservative Reformer 1804-1848; The Briton Becomes Canadian 1848-1873. Montreal & Kingston: McGill-Queen's University Press. ISBN 978-0-7735-6082-6.
- Chisholm, Joseph A. (1909). The Speeches and Public Letters of Joseph Howe. Halifax, N.S.: Chronicle Publishing Company. ISBN 978-1-3344-4603-0.
- Leger, Dan (2022). Stephen McNeil: Principle & Politics. Halifax, NS: Nimbus Publishing. ISBN 978-1-7747-1126-2.
- Saul, John Ralston (2006). Joseph Howe & The Battle for Freedom of Speech. Kentville, NS: Gaspereau Press. ISBN 978-1-5544-7018-1.
- Saunders, Edward Manning (1909). Three Premiers of Nova Scotia: the Hon. J.W. Johnstone, the Hon. Joseph Howe, the Hon. Charles Tupper. Toronto: W. Briggs. OCLC 4821351.
- Steele, Graham (2021). Nova Scotia Politics 1945-2020 From Macdonald to MacNeil. Lawrencetown Beach, NS: Pottersfield Press. ISBN 978-1-9897-2545-0.
- Walsh, Paul (1986). Political Profiles: Premiers of Nova Scotia. Halifax, N.S.: Nimbus Publishing. ISBN 0-9208-5246-7.
- Whitman, Dave; Whitman, Paulette (2014). Premier Stephen McNeil: A Story of a Nova Scotian Family. Paradise, NS: Bailey Chase Books. ISBN 978-0-9919-3441-6.

== History ==
- Bell, Winthrop P. (1961). The Foreign Protestants and the Settlement of Nova Scotia: The History of a Piece of Arrested British Colonial Policy in the Eighteenth Century. University of Toronto Press. ISBN 978-0-9191-0728-1.
- Brebner, John Bartlet (1927). New England's Outpost. Acadia before the Conquest of Canada. Columbia University Press. ISBN 978-0-2319-2128-2.
- Brebner, John Bartlet (1937). The Neutral Yankees of Nova Scotia: A Marginal Colony During the Revolutionary Years. Columbia University Press. ISBN 978-0-8462-1488-5.
- Campbell, G. G. (1948). The History of Nova Scotia. Toronto: Ryerson Press. LCCN 49005389.
- Campey, Lucille H. (2007). After the Hector: The Scottish Pioneers of Nova Scotia and Cape Breton, 1773-1852. Dundurn. ISBN 978-1-5500-2770-9.
- Campey, Lucille H. (2010). Planters, Paupers, and Pioneers: English Settlers in Atlantic Canada. Dundurn. ISBN 978-1-4597-0508-1.
- Earle, Michael (1989). Workers and the State in Twentieth Century Nova Scotia. Gorsebrook Research Institute of Atlantic Canada Studies. ISBN 978-0-9191-0721-2.
- Frank, David (1999). J. B. McLachlan: A Biography - the Story of a Legendary Labour Leader and the Cape Breton Coal Miners. James Lorimer and Company. ISBN 978-1-5502-8676-2.
- Fraser, Dawn (1992). Echoes from Labor's Wars: The Expanded Edition, Industrial Cape Breton in the 1920s, Echoes of World War One, Autobiography and Other Writings. Wreck Cove, N.S.: Breton Books. ISBN 978-1-8954-1516-2.
- Hunt, M. Stuart (1920). Nova Scotia's part in the Great War. Halifax: Nova Scotia Veteran Pub. Co. ISBN 1845747747.
- MacKinnon, Neil (1986). This Unfriendly Soil: The Loyalist Experience in Nova Scotia, 1783-1791. McGill-Queens University Press. ISBN 978-0-7735-0719-7.
- Marble, Allan E. (1993). Surgeons, Smallpox, and the Poor: A History of Medicine and Social Conditions in Nova Scotia, 1749-1799. McGill-Queens University Press. ISBN 978-0-7735-6385-8.
- McCreath, Peter L.; Leefe, John G. (1982). A History of Early Nova Scotia. Tantallon, N.S.: Four East Publications. ISBN 0-969-0041-9-2.
- Raddall, Thomas H. (1993). Halifax: Warden of the North. Halifax, N.S.: Nimbus Publishing. LCCN 65013981.
- Waite, Peter B. (1994). The Lives of Dalhousie University. Vol. 1: 1818-1925, Lord Dalhousie's College. McGill-Queens University Press. ISBN 978-0-7735-1166-8.
- Walker, James W. St. G (1992). The Black Loyalists: The Search for a Promised Land in Nova Scotia and Sierra Leone, 1783-1870. University of Toronto Press. ISBN 978-0-8020-7402-7.

=== Acadians ===
- Corbin, Carol; Krause, Eric; O'Shea, William (1995). Aspects of Louisbourg: Essays on the History of an Eighteenth-Century French Community in North America. Sydney, N.S.: University College of Cape Breton Press. ISBN 978-0-9203-3676-2.
- Deveau, J. Alphonse; Ross, Sally (1992). The Acadians of Nova Scotia: Past and Present. Halifax, NS: Nimbus Publishing. ISBN 978-1-5510-9012-2.
- Faragher, John Mack (2005). A Great and Noble Scheme: The Tragic Story of the Expulsion of the French Acadians from Their American Homeland. W.W Norton & Company. ISBN 978-0-393-05135-3.
- Griffiths, N. E. S. (2005). From Migrant to Acadian: A North American Border People, 1604-1755. McGill-Queen's University Press. ISBN 978-0-7735-2699-0.
- Johnston, A. J. B. (2007). Endgame 1758. The Promise, the Glory and the Despair of Louisbourg's Final Decade. Lincoln: University of Nebraska Press. ISBN 978-1-897009-20-8. (Canada), ISBN 978-0-8032-6009-2 (USA)
- Johnston, A. J. B. (2001). Control & Order: The Evolution of French Colonial Louisbourg, 1713-1758. East Lansing: Michigan State University Press. ISBN 0-87013-570-8.
- Lanctôt, Léopold (1988). L'Acadie des Origines, 1603-1771. Montreal, QC: Fleuve. LCCN 89177485.
- LeBlanc, Ronnie-Gilles (2005). Du Grand Dérangement à la Déportation: Nouvelles Perspectives Historiques. Moncton, N.B.: Université de Moncton. ISBN 978-1-8972-1402-2.
- Moody, Barry (1981). The Acadians. Toronto, ON: Grolier Limited. ISBN 978-0-7172-1810-3.
- Reid, John G.; Basque, Maurice; Mancke, Elizabeth; Moody, Barry; Plank, Geoffrey; Wicken, William (2004). Reid, John G.; Basque, Maurice; Mancke, Elizabeth; et al. (eds.). The "Conquest" of Acadia, 1710: Imperial, Colonial, and Aboriginal Constructions. University of Toronto Press. doi:10.3138/9781442680883. ISBN 978-0-8020-8538-2. JSTOR 10.3138/9781442680883.

=== Forestry ===
- Johnson, Ralph S. (1986). Forests of Nova Scotia: A History. Tantallon, N.S.: Four East Publications. ISBN 0920427081.
- Robertson, Barbara R. (1986). Sawpower: Making Lumber in the Sawmills of Nova Scotia. Halifax, N.S.: Nimbus Publishing. ISBN 978-0-9208-5253-8.
- Sandberg, L. Anders; Clancy, Peter (2000). Against the Grain: Foresters and Politics in Nova Scotia. Vancouver, B.C.: University of British Columbia Press. ISBN 978-0-7748-0765-4.
- Sandberg, L. Anders (1992). Trouble in the Woods: Forest Policy and Social Conflict in Nova Scotia and New Brunswick. Fredericton, N.B.: Acadiensis Press. ISBN 978-0-9191-0737-3.

=== Historiography ===
- McKay, Ian; Bates, Robin (2010). In the Province of History: The Making of the Public Past in Twentieth-Century Nova Scotia. McGill-Queens University Press. ISBN 978-0-7735-3703-3.

=== Local history ===
- Calnek, W. A. (1897). History of the County of Annapolis: including old Port Royal and Acadia. Phillimore & Co.
- Crowell, Edwin. A History of Barrington Township and Vicinity, Shelburne County, Nova Scotia. Yarmouth, N.S. ISBN 978-1-3451-3876-4.
- Cuthbertson, Brian (1996). Lunenburg: An Illustrated History. Halifax, NS: Formac Publishing Company. ISBN 978-0-8878-0358-1.
- Donovan, Kenneth (1985). Cape Breton at 200: Historical Essays in Honour of the Island's Bicentennial, 1785-1985. Sydney, N.S.: University College of Cape Breton Press. ISBN 0-9203-3634-5.
- Eaton, Arthur Wentworth Hamilton (1910). The History of Kings County, Nova Scotia. Salem, Mass.: The Salem Press Company. LCCN 10025852.
- Eaton, Arthur Wentworth Hamilton (1912). The Settling of Colchester County, Nova Scotia. Ottawa: Royal Society of Canada. LCCN 13012509.
- Fingard, Judith; Guildford, Janet; Sutherland, David (1999). Halifax: The First 250 Years. Formac Publishing Company. ISBN 978-0-8878-0490-8.
- Johnston, A. J. B. (2004). Storied Shores: St. Peter's, Isle Madame and Chapel Island in the 17th and 18th Centuries. Sydney: University College of Cape Breton Press. ISBN 978-1-897009-00-0.
- Loomer, L. S. (1996). Windsor, Nova Scotia: A Journey in History. West Hants Historical Society. ISBN 978-0-9680-6410-8.
- Milner, W. C. The Basin of Minas and its Early Settlers.
- Parker, Marian C. (1995). Voices of the Past, Hilden, 1895-1995: A History of Hilden. Brookfield, N.S: Hilden Centennial Association. ISBN 1-5505-6338-6.
- Patterson, Frank H. (1917). A History of Tatamagouche, Nova Scotia. Halifax, N.S.: Royal Print & Litho. OCLC 697792760.
- Patterson, George (1877). A History of the County of Pictou, Nova Scotia. Montreal: Dawson Bros. OCLC 5438798.
- Robertson, Allen B. (1996). Tide & Timber: Hantsport, Nova Scotia, 1795-1995. Lancelot Press. ISBN 978-0-8899-9638-0.
- Wilson, Isaiah W. (1900). A Geography and History of the County of Digby, Nova Scotia. Halifax, N.S.: Holloway Bros., Printers.

== Indigenous ==
- Elder, William (1871). "The Aborigines of Nova Scotia". The North American Review. 112 (230): 3. JSTOR 25109587.
- Frame, Elizabeth (1892). A list of Micmac names of places, rivers, etc., in Nova Scotia . Cambridge, MA: John Wilson and Son. OCLC 3506998 – via Wikisource.
- Paul, Daniel N. (1993). We Were Not the Savages: A Micmac Perspective on the Collision of European and Aboriginal Civilizations. Halifax, NS: Nimbus Publishing. ISBN 978-1-5510-9056-6. OCLC 28850226.
- Poliandri, Simone (2011). First Nations, Identity, and Reserve Life: The Mi'kmaq of Nova Scotia. University of Nebraska Press. ISBN 978-0-8032-3771-1.
- Rand, Silas Tertius (1894). Webster, Helen L. (ed.). Legends of the Micmacs. Longmans, Green and Co.
- Sable, Trudy; Francis, Bernard; Lewis, Roger J. (2012). The Language of this Land, Mi'kma'ki. Sydney, NS: Cape Breton University Press. ISBN 978-1-8970-0949-9. OCLC 773473837.

== See also ==
- Outline of Nova Scotia
- Bibliography of Canada
- Bibliography of New Brunswick
- Bibliography of the 1837-1838 insurrections in Lower Canada
- Bibliography of the War of 1812
