= Bibliography of New Brunswick =

The Flag of New Brunswick

The location of the province of New Brunswick in Canada.

This is a bibliography of works on New Brunswick.

== Bibliography ==
=== Surveys ===
- McNutt, W.S. New Brunswick: A history: 1784-1867 MacMillan, 1963 (still the standard history). 496 pp.
- MacFarlane, William G. New Brunswick Bibliography: The books and writers of the province. Saint John, 1895.

=== Localities ===
- Belliveau, Edward. Running Far In: Story of Shediac. Hantsport: Lancelot Press, 1977. 262 pp.
- Bowser, Reginald B. Dorchester Island and Related Areas. Self-published, 1986. 179 pp.
- Cooney, R. A compendious history of the northern part of the province of New Brunswick and of the District of Gaspé in Lower Canada. Halifax: Joseph Howe, 1832.
- Hebb, Ross N. Quaco - St. Martins: A brief history. Fredericton: Quaco / Springhill Press, 1997. 162 pp.
- Larracy, Edward. Chocolate River: a Story of the Petitcodiac River. Hantsport: Lancelot Press, 1985. 254 pp.
- Milner, W.C. History of Sackville. Tribune Press, 1934 (reprinted several times thereafter). 172 pp.
- Machum, Lloyd A. A History of Moncton: Town and City 1885-1965, The City of Moncton., 1965
- Mowat, Grace Helen. The Diverting History of a Loyalist Town: A portrait of St. Andrews, New Brunswick. Fredericton: Brunswick Press, 1953 (reprinted 1976). 152 pp.
- Nowlan, Alden, Campobello: The Outer Island. Toronto: Clarke, Irwin, 1975.
- Trueman, Howard. The Chignecto Isthmus: And its first settlers. Toronto: William Briggs, 1902 (reprinted by Mika Publishing, Belleville, 1975). 278 pp.
- Ward, Jeffrey P. Head of the Bay: A history of the Maringouin Peninsula, Bay of Fundy, Canada, Sackville: Tantramar Heritage Trust, 2009, 240 pp.

=== Special topics ===
- Campey, Lucille H. Planters, Paupers, and Pioneers: English Settlers in Atlantic Canada (2010)
- Campey, Lucille H. With Axe and Bible: The Scottish Pioneers of New Brunswick, 1784-1874 (Dundurn, 2007)
- Cunningham, Robert, and John B. Prince. Tamped Clay and Saltmarsh Hay (Artifacts of New Brunswick). Brunswick Press 1976. 280 pp.
- Facey-Crowther, David. The New Brunswick Militia, 1787-1867. New Brunswick Historical Society / New Ireland Press, 1990. 191 pp.
- Ganong, W. F. A Monograph on the Place-Nomenclature of the Province of New Brunswick Toronto: Copp-Clark. 1896
- Lawrence, Joseph Wilson. The Judges of New Brunswick and their Times Fredericton: Acadiensis, 1985 (reprinted from several issues of Acadiensis between 1905 and 1907, having been written in the 1880s). 552 pp.
- Leroux, John. Building New Brunswick: An architectural history. Fredericton: Goose Lane, 2008. 310 pp.
- Martin, Gwen L., Gesner's Dream: The trials and triumphs of early mining in New Brunswick, Canadian Institute of Mining, Metallurgy and Petroleum - New Brunswick Branch, 2003. 328 pp.
- Stewart, Dr. W.B., Medicine in New Brunswick, Moncton: New Brunswick Medical Society, 1974. 413 pp.
- Toner, Peter M. New Ireland Remembered: Historical Essays on the Irish in New Brunswick. Fredericton: New Ireland Press, 1988. 188 pp.

=== Pre 1784 ===
Prior to 1784, New Brunswick was a part of Nova Scotia, and before that, of Acadia. It was originally settled by the Mi'Kmaq and Maliseet tribes.

==== General ====
- Gwyn, Julian. Excessive Expectations: Maritime Commerce and the Economic Development of Nova Scotia, 1740-1870 McGill-Queen's University Press, 1998. 291 pp.
- Whitelaw, William Menzies; The Maritimes and Canada before Confederation (1934) online

==== Pre-Columbian era ====
- Davis, Stephen A. Míkmaq: Peoples of the Maritimes, Nimbus Publishing, 1998.

==== Acadian era (1604-1755) ====
- Brebner, John Bartlet. New England's Outpost: Acadia before the conquest of Canada. New York: Columbia University Press, 1927. 291 pp.
- Faragher, John Mack (2005). A Great and Noble Scheme: The Tragic Story of the Expulsion of the French Acadians from Their American Homeland. W.W Norton & Company. ISBN 978-0-393-05135-3.
- Griffiths, N.E.S. (2005). From Migrant to Acadian: A North American Border People, 1604-1755. McGill-Queen's University Press. ISBN 978-0-7735-2699-0.
- Hand, Chris M., The Siege of Fort Beausejour, Fredericton: Goose Lane Editions and the New Brunswick Military Heritage Project, 2004. 109 pp.
- Lanctôt, Léopold. L'Acadie des Origines, 1603-1771 Montreal: Fleuve, 1988. 234 pp.
- LeBlanc, Ronnie-Gilles (2005). Du Grand Dérangement à la Déportation: Nouvelles Perspectives Historiques. Moncton: Université de Moncton, 465 pages (book in French and English)
- Reid, John G.; Basque, Maurice; Mancke, Elizabeth; Moody, Barry; Plank, Geoffrey; Wicken, William (2004). Reid, John G.; Basque, Maurice; Mancke, Elizabeth; et al. (eds.). The "Conquest" of Acadia, 1710: Imperial, Colonial, and Aboriginal Constructions. University of Toronto Press. doi:10.3138/9781442680883. ISBN 978-0-8020-8538-2. JSTOR 10.3138/9781442680883.

==== Foreign Protestants (1753-1766) ====
- Bell, Winthrop P. The "Foreign Protestants" and the Settlement of Nova Scotia: The History of a Piece of Arrested British Colonial Policy in the Eighteenth Century. (1961). reprint Fredericton, N.B.: Acadiensis for Mount Allison U., Cen. for Can. Studies, 1990. 673 pp.
- Hempel, Rainer L. New Voices on the Shores: Early Pennsylvania German Settlements in New Brunswick. Toronto: German-Canadian Historical Association, 2000.486 pp.

==== New England Planters (1759-1766) ====
- Brebner, John Bartlet. The Neutral Yankees of Nova Scotia: A Marginal Colony During the Revolutionary Years (1937)
- Clarke, Ernest. The Siege of Fort Cumberland: An episode in the American Revolution. McGill-Queen's University Press, 1995. 302 pp.
- Conrad, Margaret, ed. They Planted Well: New England Planters in Maritime Canada. Fredericton: Acadiensis, 1988. 321 pp.
- Conrad, Margaret, ed. Making Adjustments: Change and Continuity in Planter Nova Scotia, 1759-1800. Fredericton: Acadiensis, 1991. 280 pp.
- Conrad, Margaret, ed. Intimate Relations: Family and Community in Planter Nova Scotia, 1759-1800. Fredericton: Acadiensis, 1995. 298 pp.
- Conrad, Margaret and Moody, Barry, ed. Planter Links: Community and Culture in Colonial Nova Scotia. Fredericton: Acadiensis, 2001. 236 pp.
- Desserud, Donald A. (1999). "Outpost's Response: The Language and Politics of Moderation in Eighteenth-Century Nova Scotia". American Review of Canadian Studies. 29 – via Questia.
- Stewart, Gordon, and George Rawlyk, A People Highly Favoured of God: The Nova Scotia Yankees and the American Revolution. Toronto: MacMillan, 1972. 219 pp.

=== 1784 - 1900 ===
- Beavan, Mrs. Francis. Life in the Backwoods of New Brunswick. London: Routledge, 1845 (reprinted 1980 by Print 'n' Press, Fredericton), 142 pp.
- Marquis, Greg. In Armageddon's Shadow: The Civil War and Canada's Maritime Provinces, McGill-Queen's University Press, 1998. 389 pp.
- Smith, Joshua M. Borderland Smuggling: Patriots, loyalists and illicit trade in the Northeast, 1783-1820, University Press of Florida, 2006, 160 pp.
- Steeves, Helen Harper, The Story of Moncton's First Store and Storekeeper. Saint John: J & A. MacMillan, 1924. 178 pp.
- Stewart, George. The Story of the Great Fire in St. John, N.B., June 20th, 1877, Toronto: Belford Brothers, 1877. online
- Temperley, Howard. Gubbins' New Brunswick Journals, 1811 & 1813. Fredericton: New Brunswick Heritage Publications, 1980. 92 pp.
- Wilson, Barry K, Benedict Arnold: A traitor in our midst, Montreal and Kingston: McGill-Queen's University Press. 2001. 270 pp.
- Wynn, Graeme. Timber Colony: A historical geography of early nineteenth century New Brunswick. University of Toronto Press, 1981. 224 pp.

=== Since 1900 ===
- Doyle, Arthur T. Front Benches and Back Rooms: A story of corruption, muckraking, raw partisanship and political intrigue in New Brunswick [1908 - 1935]. Toronto: Green Tree, 1976. 306 pp.
- How, Douglas and Ralph Costello, K.C.: The biography of K.C. Irving Toronto: Key Porter Books, 1993. 400 pp.

== See also ==
- Outline of New Brunswick
- Index of New Brunswick-related articles
- Bibliography of Canada
- Bibliography of Canadian provinces and territories
- Bibliography of Nova Scotia
- Bibliography of the 1837-1838 insurrections in Lower Canada
- Bibliography of the War of 1812
