= The Lives of the Saints (miniseries) =

- Based on: Lives of the Saints by Nino Ricci
- Written by: Malcolm MacRury
- Directed by: Jerry Ciccoritti
- Starring: Sophia Loren; Sabrina Ferilli; Fab Filippo; Jessica Paré; Nick Mancuso; Kris Kristofferson
- Country of origin: Canada; Italy
- Original languages: English; Italian

Production
- Producer: Gabriella Martinelli
- Cinematography: Fabio Cianchetti
- Editor: George Roulston

Original release
- Network: Italy
- Release: 20 September 2004
- Network: Canada
- Release: 2 January 2005

The Lives of the Saints is a 2004 TV miniseries directed by Jerry Ciccoritti, written by Malcolm MacRury, and based on the 1990 novel Lives of the Saints, by Nino Ricci. The film stars Sophia Loren, Fab Filippo and Jessica Paré.

== Plot ==
Part 1

Told in flashbacks, Vittorio "Vito" Innocente is a young boy living in the Italian village, Val di Sole, during the 1950s. He is raised by his beautiful mother Cristina and paternal aunt (zia) Teresa, while his father, Mario, has recently immigrated to Canada. Teresa is a widowed schoolteacher and strives to keep her family on the right moral path. She and Vittorio are shown to be very close. One day, she gives him a book called The Lives of the Saints.

While Mario is away, Cristina begins an affair with Matthew Bok, a Canadian wartime artist, whom Teresa disapproves of. Vittorio tells his friend Fabrizio, about catching Cristina and the ‘blue-eyed man’ in a stable and how Cristina was also bitten by a snake. This is seen as a bad omen. The townspeople discover Cristina's affair after she becomes visibly pregnant. They shun both her and by extension Vittorio, for her adulterous behaviour. Unaware of his wife's indiscretion, Mario sends for his family, leaving Teresa behind temporarily. Before leaving, Cristina hints to Teresa that she is planning to start a new life with Bok in Halifax and that does not intend to meet up with Mario and his brother Alfredo. On board the ship, she dies giving birth to a baby girl. Vittorio names the girl Rita, after Saint Rita from Teresa's book.

In Toronto, Rita has blue eyes just like her biological father and her presence casts a shadow over the family as she is a constant reminder of Cristina's affair. Vittorio becomes her protector as she is neglected and abused by Mario. Rita is close to her classmate Elena Amherst, whose WASP family eventually adopts her. Like Cristina, Rita is never mentioned in the Innocente household again.

Years later, Vittorio, who now goes by "Victor" has a strained relationship with his father and lives in one of the Canadian territories with his girlfriend, Kate Townsend. He works as a teacher and continues to face discrimination for his Italian heritage.

Mario finds Bok's love letters to Cristina which Teresa had kept hidden from him. After angrily confronting his sister, Mario leaves to find and kill Rita. Unable to do it, he asks Rita to forgive him and ends up committing suicide in her driveway instead.

Part 2

Vittorio returns to the family tomato farm for Mario's funeral and reconnects with Rita there. She has grown to be a passionate, yet troubled young woman, much like Cristina. In his will, Mario leaves everything to Vittorio, which causes tension between him and Alfredo. Surprisingly, there are instructions for Vittorio to take care of Rita as well.

Vittorio and Rita become unnaturally close and Vittorio begins to get jealous when she flirts with other men. At the same time, Rita confides to Teresa that she has always wanted to know her father. Teresa lies that she does not know who he is. Moved by Rita's confession, Teresa gets in contact with Bok who reveals his side of the affair with Cristina. Teresa leaves abruptly when she discovers Bok had painted her after she was raped by soldiers years ago.

Rita meets with her father, but the meeting does not go well. Upset and confused, Rita returns home and sleeps with Vittorio. This results in Vittorio having a breakdown and he is comforted by Teresa. Teresa later tells Vittorio that Rita has patched things up with Bok and will be going on a trip to Abruzzo with his family. This angers Vittorio and he accuses Teresa of having an affair with Bok after he sees the painting of her. In tears, she reveals the truth about her rape.

Vittorio follows Rita to Val di Sole and is openly hostile towards Bok. While rediscovering his old family home, he runs into a grown up Fabrizio. He grows increasingly obsessed with Rita, who brushes off their sexual encounter. At this point, Vittorio is ready to kill Bok, whom he blames for his parents' deaths. Teresa tells him to let go of the past and reveals that she is his biological mother. This also means that he and Rita are not half-siblings like they had been led to believe all of their lives. Angered, Vittorio drives away and ends up critically injured in an accident. He wakes up in the hospital and accepts Teresa as his mother.

In the epilogue, Teresa narrates that after Mario found out about her out-of-wedlock pregnancy, he and Cristina had raised Vittorio as their own. The family, including Rita, are seen eating around the dinner table. Vittorio has a son named Mario (after his late adoptive father and maternal uncle), and he has married Kate who is heavily pregnant with their second child. Vittorio and Alfredo are running the family business Innocente and Sons, as Teresa reads the story of Saint Rita to Vittorio's son.

== Cast ==
- Sophia Loren as Teresa Innocente
- Fab Filippo as Vittorio Innocente
- Jessica Paré as Rita Amherst
- Sabrina Ferilli as Cristina Innocente
- Kris Kristofferson as Matthew Bok
- Nick Mancuso as Mario Innocente
- Michael A. Miranda as Alfredo Innocente
- Jennie Raymond as Kate Townsend
- Kate Trotter as Mrs. Amherst
- Stephanie Mills as Elena Amherst
- Bruce Gooch as Reverend Amherst
- Flavio Pacilli as Young Vittorio
- Joseph Marrese as Teen Vittorio
- Massimo De Santis as older Fabrizio
- Robert Dawson as Dr. Bentley, ship doctor
- Valeria Benedetti Michelangeli as unnamed ship nurse

== Reception ==
The Lives of the Saints received mostly mixed reviews from critics It holds a 42% "Fresh" rating on the review aggregate website Rotten Tomatoes. The film won a DGC Craft Award for an Outstanding Achievement in Direction - Television Movie/Mini-Series.
