= Sally Gibson =

Author, archivist and heritage consultant

Sally Gibson is an author, archivist and heritage consultant who resides in Toronto and has written three books about the city and its heritage. She has a Master of Urban Studies from Yale University, and a Master of Library Science and a Ph.D. in Urban Geography from the University of Toronto. Gibson grew up in New Jersey, went to Vassar College, and moved to Toronto in 1969. Her first book, More than an Island: A History of the Toronto Island was described by urban thinker Jane Jacobs as "city history at its very best". Her second book, Inside Toronto: Urban Interiors 1880s to 1920s, was a finalist for the City of Toronto Book Award and won a Heritage Toronto Book Award of Excellence in 2007. Her third book, Toronto’s Distillery District: History by the Lake, evolved from her work as the Distillery District's site historian and won a Heritage Toronto Book Award of Merit in 2009.

== Publications ==
- Toronto's Distillery District: History by the Lake. Toronto: Distillery Historic District, 2008. ISBN 978-0-9809905-0-8
- Inside Toronto: Urban Interiors 1880s to 1920s. Toronto: Cormorant Books, 2006 ISBN 1-896951-95-3, ISBN 978-1-896951-95-9
- More Than an Island: A History of the Toronto Island. Toronto: Irwin, 1984 ISBN 0-7720-1446-9, ISBN 978-0-7720-1446-7

== Awards ==
- Heritage Toronto Award of Merit 2009, for Toronto's Distillery District: History by the Lake
- Canadian Association of Heritage Professionals, Communications Award 2009, for Distillery District Tenant Handouts Project
- Heritage Toronto Award of Excellence 2008, for Distillery District Heritage Website at www.distilleryheritage.com
- Canadian Association of Heritage Professionals, Communications Award 2008, for Distillery District Heritage Website at www.distilleryheritage.com
- Heritage Toronto Award of Excellence 2007, for Inside Toronto: Urban Interiors 1880s-1920s
- City of Toronto Book Award finalist 2007, for Inside Toronto: Urban Interiors 1880s-1920s
- Canadian Association of Heritage Professionals Communications Award 2007, for Inside Toronto: Urban Interiors 1880s-1920s

== See also ==
- Toronto Islands
- Distillery District
