= Lives of the Saints (Ricci novel) =

1990 Canadian novel

- First edition
- Author: Nino Ricci
- Language: English
- Genre: Drama
- Publisher: Cormorant Books
- Publication date: September 1990
- Publication place: Canada
- Media type: Print (Hardback & Paperback)
- Pages: 248 p. (Paperback edition)
- ISBN: 1-896951-43-0
- OCLC: 48671012
- Preceded by: N/A. First work by the author.
- Followed by: In a Glass House

Lives of the Saints is a novel by Canadian writer Nino Ricci. The author's first book, it forms the first part of a trilogy. The other two novels are In a Glass House and Where She Has Gone. Lives of the Saints was first published in 1990 and was the winner of the 1990 Governor General's Awards for fiction.

== Synopsis ==
=== Film ===
Vittorio Innocente's father, Mario, has immigrated to Canada, though originally believed to be America, to pave the way for the rest of his family to come. Little Vittorio doesn't understand why the neighbours disapprove of his mother, but suspects it has something to do with the man she was with in the stable on the morning she was violently bitten by the snake. But it becomes clear that it is Cristina's independence of mind and rejection of superstition that offend the peasant values in this remote village in post-war Italy. In the miniseries, Vittorio seeks comfort from his teacher, Aunt Teresa "La Maestra", who unlike the neighbours, sympathizes with Vittorio, and consoles him. Aunt Teresa hides Cristina when she becomes visibly pregnant while her husband is away, and helps Vittorio understand life through stories in a book she gave him called Lives of the Saints, while in the novel Zia Lucia (Aunt Teresa) is a completely different character from "La Maestra". Cristina and Vittorio depart to Canada to meet Mario, but the Cristina dies on the ship giving birth to Vittorio's sister, Rita. Rita has bright blue eyes like her father, which serves as a constant reminder of Cristina's affair.

=== Novel ===
The book focuses on the unspoken affair Cristina Innocente is having with the "blue-eyed man" (Vittorio first sees when at the stable with the snake). Ever since the incident with the snake, Cristina is scrutinized by the townspeople as a "whore" who is sleeping around while her husband, Mario, is working and sending her money from America. Cristina has become pregnant and Vittorio, her 7-year-old son, remains oblivious to the entirety of the situation until much later in his life. Cristina's scrutiny leads to the isolation of the Innocente family: her father resigns as mayor and Vittorio is bullied; not to mention, Mario was informed of Cristina's pregnancy. The townspeople's ruthless treatment leads Cristina to leave the town of Valle del Sole with Vittorio.The townspeople assume it is to meet with Mario, but hinted that Cristina had actually made plans with the "blue-eyed man". It is never clear as Cristina dies on the boat to America, but the blue-eyed man does pay Vittorio a visit in the infirmary in Canada, so one may assume this. Vittorio then lives his life on his own from then.

== Main characters ==
- Vittorio
- Cristina
- Grandfather/nonno
- Fabrizio
- La Maestra

== Themes ==
- The innocence of children
- The coming of age of the male artist
- Parent and child relationships
- Growing up and coming of age
- Individual Vs. sex society
- Loss of innocence
- Superstition, Luck & Beliefs

== Television adaptation ==
In 2004, in the novel was adapted into a television miniseries, entitled Lives of the Saints, in an Italian-Canadian co-production starring Sophia Loren, Fabrizio Filippo, Jessica Paré, Sabrina Ferilli, Kris Kristofferson and Nick Mancuso. The miniseries has earned six nominations and won three awards.
