= Tess Fragoulis =

Canadian writer and educator

Tess Fragoulis is a Canadian writer and educator. Born in Heraklion, Crete, Greece, she was raised in Montreal, Quebec, where she attended Concordia University. Her first book, Stories to Hide from Your Mother (Arsenal Pulp Press, 1997), was nominated for the QSPELL First Book Award. One of the stories was adapted for the television series Bliss. Her second book, Ariadne's Dream (Thistledown Press, 2001) was long-listed for the IMPAC International Dublin Literary Prize. She is the editor of Musings: an anthology of Greek-Canadian Literature (Véhicule Press, 2004). She has also published in numerous literary journals, magazines and newspapers in North America, and teaches literature and writing in Montreal. Her latest novel, The Goodtime Girl (2012), is published by Cormorant Books in Canada, and was published in Greek by Psichogios Publications in Greece in 2013 under the title Το Μαργαριτἀρι της Ανατολἠς (The Anatolian Pearl).

== Bibliography ==
=== Short stories ===
- Stories to Hide from Your Mother – 1997, Arsenal Pulp Press

=== Novels ===
- Ariadne's Dream – 2001, Thistledown Press
- The Goodtime Girl – 2012, Cormorant Books
- The Goodtime Girl – 2013, Psichogios Publications

=== Anthologies edited ===
- Musings: An Anthology of Greek-Canadian Literature – 2004 (with Steven Heighton and Helen Tsiriotakis), Véhicule Press
