= Margaret McBurney =

Canadian writer (1931–2018)

- Born: Margaret Isobel McElroy; 27 February 1931; Regina, Saskatchewan
- Died: 17 November 2018 (aged 87)
- Occupation: Writer

Margaret Isobel McBurney (27 February 1931 – 17 November 2018) was a Canadian writer and activist. Born in Saskatchewan, she was the first woman to graduate from the interior design program at the University of Manitoba. Together with Mary Byers, she wrote extensively on the topics of topics of architecture and social history. McBurney was also recognized for her advocacy, having successfully lobbied the federal government to ban firecrackers.

== Early life and education ==
Margaret McBurney (née McElroy) was born on 27 February 1931 in Regina, Saskatchewan, to parents Harold and Ethel McElroy. Her father was a banker, and her mother a schoolteacher. She had a younger brother named Murdoch. After graduating from high school, McBurney attended the University of Manitoba where she earned a degree in interior design, becoming the first woman to graduate from the program. She subsequently began her career at a Regina-based architectural firm.

== Career ==
She married her husband, Robert McBurney, in 1955. Her father died one year later in a plane crash at the age of 56. McBurney and her husband had two children together: Jane Ann McBurney and John McBurney. The family moved to London, Ontario, where she took a job as a designer; they then moved to Toronto. In 1965, McBurney began surveying pre-1855 Ontario buildings for the Ontario Architectural Inventory in a project run by the University of Toronto. In 1968, she adopted a child named Margaret.

McBurney met the writer Mary Byers while working at the Ontario Architectural Inventory. Together, they approached the University of Toronto Press, and successfully pitched their first book. Rural Roots: Pre-Confederation Buildings of the York Region of Ontario was published in 1976; the pair subsequently published three more books on Ontario history and architecture. McBurney and Byers later travelled together in Atlantic Canada, producing Atlantic Hearth: Early Homes and Families of Nova Scotia (1994) and True Newfoundlanders: Early Homes and Families of Newfoundland and Labrador (1997).

A member of the Arts and Letters Club of Toronto since 1986, the first year women were admitted, McBurney wrote a variety of books and articles on the topics of architecture and social history. Beginning in 1998, she served as the club's first female president. For the club's 100th anniversary, McBurney wrote The Great Adventure: 100 Years at the Arts & Letters Club to recount its history.

== Advocacy ==
In 1971, McBurney's son John was injured by firecrackers and spent six weeks in the hospital recovering. With the help of the Junior League of Toronto, she successfully lobbied the federal government to amend the Explosives Act to ban firecrackers and restrict the purchase of fireworks.

John McBurney, in his 20s, died in 1980 in Vancouver after being struck by a drunk driver who fled the scene. The driver, who was not located until six months following the incident, received minimal consequences. They were sentenced to two months of community service, but this sentence was waived. Following this experience, McBurney called for more severe penalties for impaired drivers.

== Publications ==
=== Books ===
- McBurney, Margaret; Byers, Mary; Kennedy, Jan (1976). Rural Roots: Pre-Confederation Buildings of the York Region of Ontario. Toronto: University of Toronto Press. ISBN 978-0-8020-2230-1.
- McBurney, Margaret; Byers, Mary (1979). Homesteads: Early Buildings and Families from Kingston to Toronto. Toronto: University of Toronto Press. ISBN 0-8020-2357-6.
- —; Byers, Mary (1987). Tavern in the Town: Early Inns and Taverns of Ontario. Toronto: University of Toronto Press. ISBN 0-8020-5732-2.
- —; Byers, Mary (1989). Governor's Road: Early Buildings and Families from Mississauga to London. Toronto: University of Toronto Press. ISBN 978-0-8020-6533-9.
- —; Byers, Mary (1994). Atlantic Hearth: Early Homes and Families of Nova Scotia. Toronto: University of Toronto Press. ISBN 978-0-8020-2935-5.
- —; Byers, Mary (1997). True Newfoundlanders: Early Homes and Families of Newfoundland and Labrador. Buffalo, N.Y.: Boston Mills Press. ISBN 978-1-5504-6199-2.
- — (2007). The Great Adventure: 100 Years at the Arts & Letters Club. Toronto: Arts and Letters Club of Toronto. ISBN 978-0-9694-5882-1.
- —, ed. (2012). It's All about Kindness: Remembering June Callwood. Toronto: Cormorant Books. ISBN 978-1-8971-5179-2.

=== Articles ===
- Margaret, McBurney; Byers, Mary (12 May 1983). "Missionaries' home has classical look". The Globe and Mail. p. 22.
- —; — (9 June 1983). "In search of Whiteoaks' Jalna". The Globe and Mail. p. 25.
- —; — (8 December 1983). "Pioneer's legacy wrought in iron". The Globe and Mail. p. 45.
- —; — (12 April 1984). "Grim deeds in neo-classicism". The Globe and Mail. p. 71.
- —; — (10 May 1984). "This Lake Simcoe lovenest became a model manor". The Globe and Mail. p. 69.
- —; — (14 June 1984). "The ghost, the house and the stove". The Globe and Mail. p. 83.
- —; — (12 July 1984). "The riddles of a Regency cottage". The Globe and Mail. p. 63.
- —; — (13 September 1984). "Restoration specialist survived by legacy". The Globe and Mail. p. 63.
- —; — (8 November 1984). "Splendid solitude had a price". The Globe and Mail. p. 78.
- —; — (13 December 1984). "Group of Seven convened in the parlor". The Globe and Mail. p. 76.
- —; — (10 January 1985). "Industrious pioneer, scalawag children". The Globe and Mail. p. 75.
- — (6 March 1995). "Care for the dying: whatever it takes". The Globe and Mail. p. 14.
- — (9 December 2006). "Spirits in the sky". The Globe and Mail. p. 111.
