= Cormorant Books =

Canadian book publishing company

Cormorant Books Inc.
- Founded: 1986
- Founder: Jan and Gary Geddes
- Country of origin: Canada
- Headquarters location: Toronto, Ontario
- Distribution: University of Toronto Press Distribution (Canada, US); Orca Books (Dancing Cat, US)
- Key people: J. Marc Côté (Publisher)
- Publication types: Books
- Imprints: Dancing Cat Books
- No. of employees: 5 (as of January 31, 2021)
- Official website: www.cormorantbooks.com

Cormorant Books Inc is a Canadian book publishing company. The company's current publisher is Marc Côté.

Cormorant Books specializes in fiction by new and emerging Canadian writers, reissues of out-of-print classics of Canadian literature, and English translations of works by Quebec writers. In 2010, the company also launched Dancing Cat Books, a separate imprint for works of young adult literature.

== History ==
Cormorant Books was started in 1986 by a Canadian couple, Jan and Gary Geddes, on their farm outside of Dunvegan, Ontario. They focused on introducing new Canadian writers to the literary scene, focusing principally on poetry. In 1990, the company published Nino Ricci's novel Lives of the Saints, which went on to become one of the year's bestselling Canadian novels and to win the 1990 Governor General's Award for English-language fiction.

The company was sold to new owners in 2001. Now based in Toronto, publisher Marc Côté continues the tradition of publishing Canadian authors, including translations of Quebec writers.

== Published writers ==
Authors who have been published by Cormorant include:

- Douglas Arrowsmith
- Margaret Atwood
- Carol Bishop-Gwyn
- Neil Bissoondath
- Pan Bouyoucas
- George Bowering
- Joseph Boyden
- Carol Bruneau
- Aaron Bushkowsky
- Elspeth Cameron
- Joan Clark
- Patricia Claxton
- Carole Corbeil
- Hélène Dorion
- Cary Fagan
- Brian Fawcett
- Sheila Fischman
- Tess Fragoulis
- Sally Gibson
- Sky Gilbert
- Jacques Godbout
- Gwethalyn Graham
- Darren Greer
- Elizabeth Hay
- Claire Holden Rothman
- Pauline Holdstock
- Dave Hugelschaffer
- Maureen Jennings
- George Jonas
- M. Travis Lane
- Tim Lilburn
- Kevin Major
- Tessa McWatt
- David Miller
- Goldie Morgentaler
- Peter Oliva
- Charles Pachter
- Edward O. Phillips
- Jacques Poulin
- Pascale Quiviger
- Gayla Reid
- Nino Ricci
- Ray Robertson
- Linda Rogers
- Chava Rosenfarb
- Jeffrey Round
- Elizabeth Ruth
- Olive Senior
- Michael V. Smith
- Mary Soderstrom
- Susan Swan
- Lola Lemire Tostevin
- Thomas Trofimuk
- Élise Turcotte
- Peter Unwin
- Betsy Warland
- William Whitehead
- Zoe Whittall
- Carol Windley
- Eric Wright

== Awards ==
In 1990, Lives of the Saints by Nino Ricci won the Governor General's Award for English-language fiction.

In 2003, Doing the Heart Good by Neil Bissoondath won the Hugh MacLennan Award of the Quebec Writers' Federation Awards.

In 2004, Beyond Measure by Pauline Holdstock was nominated for the Giller Prize. It won the Ethel Wilson Fiction Prize of the BC Book Prizes in 2005 and was nominated for the Commonwealth Writers' Prize - Canada and the Caribbean Region, as well.

In 2005, The Unyielding Clamour of the Night by Neil Bissoondath won the Hugh MacLennan Award of the Quebec Writers' Federation.

The Perfect Circle by Pascale Quiviger and Home Schooling by Carol Windley were shortlisted for the Scotiabank Giller Prize in 2006. Home Schooling won the Ethel Wilson Fiction Prize of the BC Book Prizes in 2007.

In 2008, Cormorant published its first children's book, M is for Moose, an alphabet book by internationally acclaimed artist Charles Pachter.

In 2009, The Heart Specialist by Claire Holden Rothman was longlisted for the Scotiabank Giller Prize.

In 2011, My Life Among the Apes by Cary Fagan was longlisted for the Scotiabank Giller Prize.

Two Cormorant publications, Still Life with June by Darren Greer, and An English Gentleman by Sky Gilbert have received ReLit Awards.

Cormorant Books has won five Canadian Booksellers Association Libris Awards, including the 2008, 2009 and 2013 awards for Small Press of the Year and the 2009 and 2010 Libris to Marc Côté for Editor of the Year.
