= North Atlantic triangle =

Theoretical construct for studying the history of Canadian foreign policy

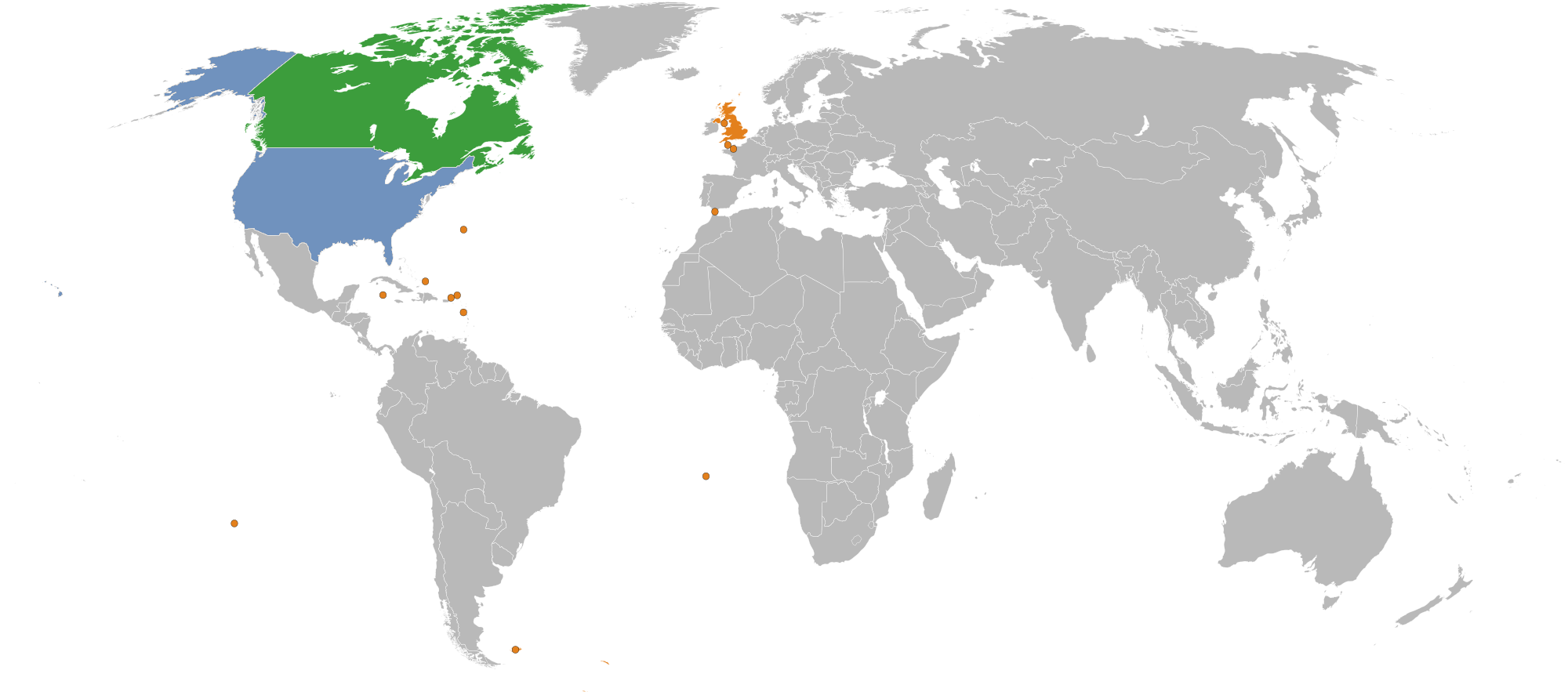
North Atlantic triangle

The North Atlantic triangle is a theoretical construct for studying the history of Canadian foreign policy. First proposed by the historian John Bartlet Brebner, it seeks to explain the importance of United Kingdom–United States relations to Canada's security, and even survival, during the late nineteenth and early twentieth centuries. The triangle in question was Canada, the United States, and the United Kingdom. This triangle was invisible to Americans or Britons, for whom Canada was a side issue at best, but it was vital to Canada. Canada was intimately involved with both countries, and needed good relations between them for its own security. The primary concern of Canadian governments was to avoid a repetition of the American invasions of 1775 and 1812–1815, when Canada had been used as the battlefield where American and British differences were settled.

Culturally and philosophically, most Canadians of the era (especially the ethnically British majority) identified with Britain and the British Empire and distrusted the United States, but at the same time many Canadians were eager to trade with the large, growing, and nearby market in the United States.

== Overview ==
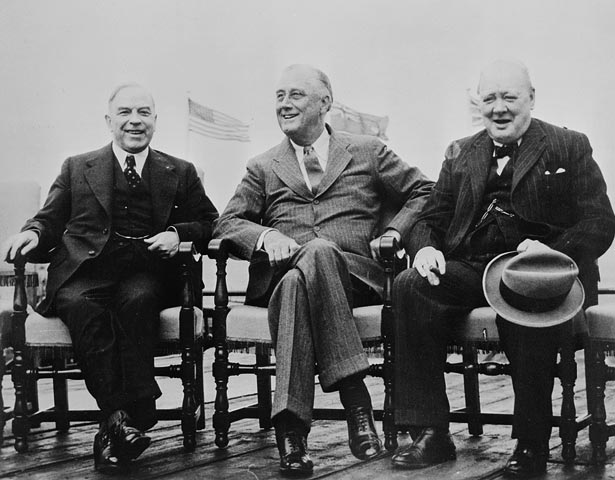
William Lyon Mackenzie King, Franklin Roosevelt, and Winston Churchill at the First Quebec Conference in 1943

Canada's interest in Anglo-American relations began as early as the Canadian–American Reciprocity Treaty of 1854, when Canada was still a disunited collection of British colonies. The short era of increased trade with the US that the treaty created (lasting to 1866) deeply influenced Canadian trade policy and attitudes towards the US for years to come, encouraging the free traders. But the treaty's cancellation by the Americans also raised suspicions in Canada.

Of even more serious concern were the repeated war scares between Britain and the northern, Union government in the American Civil War, which threatened Canada with another invasion over the Trent Affair, the Alabama Incident, and so on.

After Canada federated and became a self-governing dominion in 1867, Canada's new federal government became part of Anglo-American relations. At the Washington conference of 1871 which discussed all issues of Anglo-American relations, Canada's prime minister, Sir John A. Macdonald participated as part of the British delegation. This was the beginning of a kind of triangle diplomacy lasted in various forms for decades.

Canadian Prime Minister Sir Robert Borden sought to create an Anglo-American alliance during the Paris peace talks of 1919, and pushed Britain to renounce its alliance with Japan and instead come to an agreement with the US during the 1920s. Canada also hoped to become part of the inner circle of allied decision making during the Second World War, and Prime Minister William Lyon Mackenzie King hosted British Prime Minister Winston Churchill and US President Franklin Roosevelt in Quebec City for that reason.
