= Index of New Brunswick-related articles =

The location of the province of New Brunswick in Canada

The following is an alphabetical list of articles related to the Canadian province of New Brunswick.

== 0–9 ==
- .nb.ca – Internet second-level domain for the province of New Brunswick
- 2023 New Brunswick local governance reform

== A ==
- Abies balsamea – provincial tree of New Brunswick
- Acadia
  - Acadians
    - Acadian French
- Adjacent provinces and state:
  - Province de Québec
  - Province of Nova Scotia
  - Province of Prince Edward Island
  - State of Maine
- Administrative divisions of New Brunswick
- Airports in New Brunswick
- Area codes in New Brunswick

== B ==
- Bathurst, New Brunswick
- Bay of Fundy
- Black-capped chickadee - provincial Bird of New Brunswick
- Bodies of water of New Brunswick

== C ==
- Canada
  - Provinces and territories of Canada
- Cities in New Brunswick
- Counties of New Brunswick
- COVID-19 pandemic in New Brunswick
- Culture of New Brunswick

== D ==
- Demographics of New Brunswick
- Designated places in New Brunswick

== E ==
- Economy of New Brunswick
  - Category:Economy of New Brunswick
- Education in New Brunswick
  - Category:Education in New Brunswick
- Executive Council of New Brunswick
  - Category:Executive Council of New Brunswick

== F ==
The flag of New Brunswick

- Fauna of New Brunswick
- First Nations in New Brunswick
- Flag of New Brunswick
- Forts in New Brunswick
  - Category:Forts in New Brunswick
- Fredericton (capital city)
- French language in Canada

== G ==
- Geography of New Brunswick
- Government of New Brunswick
  - Government House
  - Category:Government of New Brunswick

== H ==
- Higher education in New Brunswick
- Highways of New Brunswick
- History of New Brunswick
  - Category:History of New Brunswick
- Hospitals in New Brunswick
  - Category:Hospitals in New Brunswick

== I ==
- Irving Group of Companies
  - Category:Irving Group of Companies
- Islands of New Brunswick

== J ==
- J. D. Irving

== L ==
- L'Acadie
- Law in New Brunswick
- Legislative Assembly of New Brunswick
- Lieutenant Governor of New Brunswick
- Local service district
  - Local service districts in New Brunswick

== M ==
- Mass media in New Brunswick
- Mi'kmaq
- Monarchy in New Brunswick
- Mountains of New Brunswick
- Moncton
- Municipalities of New Brunswick

== N ==
- National Historic Sites in New Brunswick
  - Category:National Historic Sites in New Brunswick
- Neighbourhoods in New Brunswick
- New Brunswick website
  - Category:New Brunswick
    - commons:Category:New Brunswick
- New Brunswick Legislature
  - Category:New Brunswick Legislature
- New France

== P ==
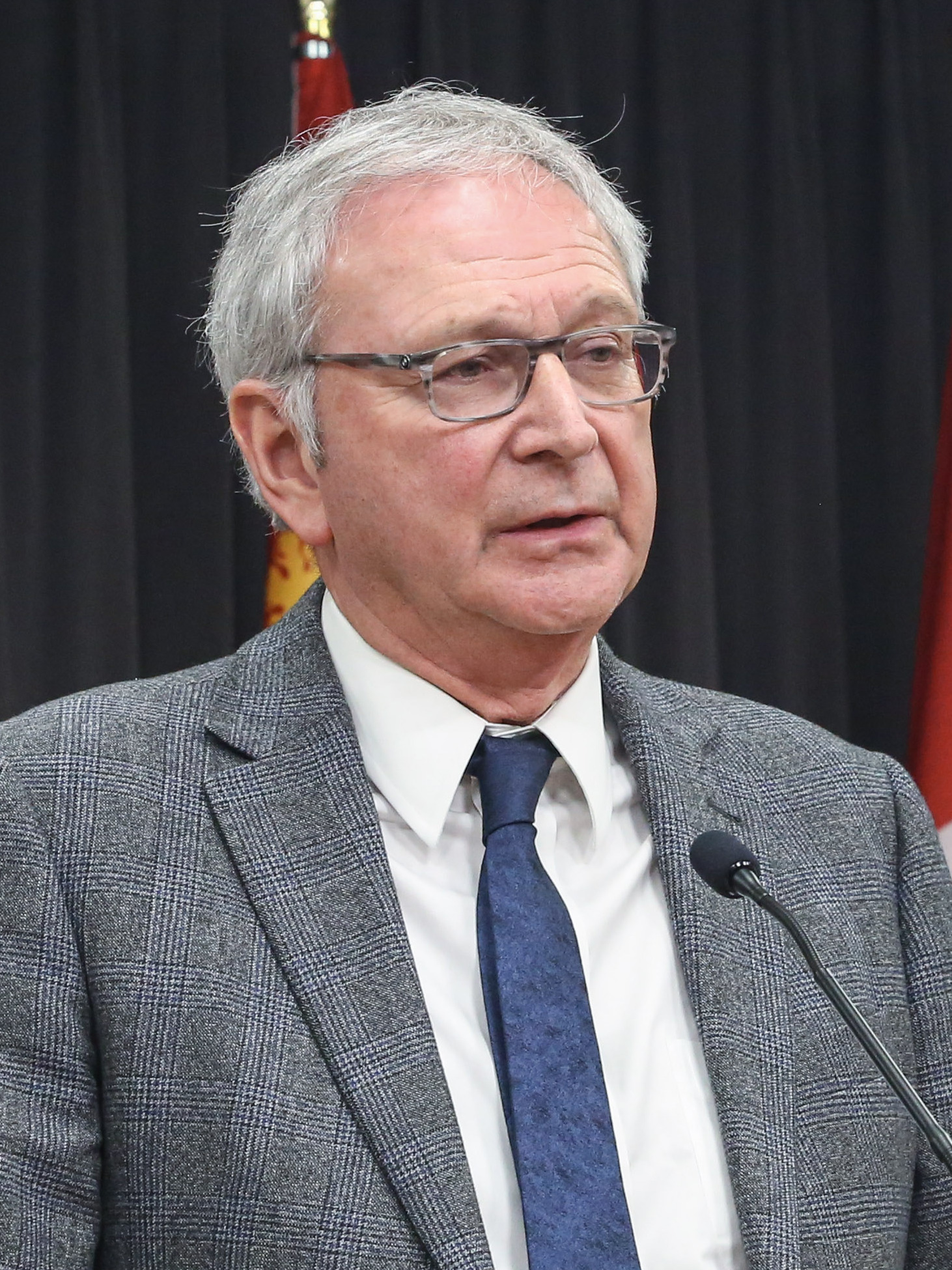
Blaine Higgs, the current premier of New Brunswick

- Parishes of New Brunswick
- People from New Brunswick
- Politics of New Brunswick
- Political parties of New Brunswick
- Population centres of New Brunswick
- Premier of New Brunswick
  - List of premiers of New Brunswick
- Protected areas of New Brunswick
- Provincial electoral districts of New Brunswick

== R ==
- Radio stations in New Brunswick
  - Category:Radio stations in New Brunswick
- Regional service commission
- Religion in New Brunswick
  - Category:Religion in New Brunswick

== S ==
- Saint John, New Brunswick
- Same-sex marriage in New Brunswick
- Schools in New Brunswick
- Sports in New Brunswick
- Symbols of New Brunswick

== T ==
- The Maritimes
- Tourism in New Brunswick
  - Category:Tourism in New Brunswick
- Towns in New Brunswick

== U ==
- Universities and colleges in New Brunswick

== V ==
- Viola cucullata – provincial flower of New Brunswick

== W ==
- Wildlife of New Brunswick
- Wolastoq
