= Demographics of New Brunswick =

Demographics of region

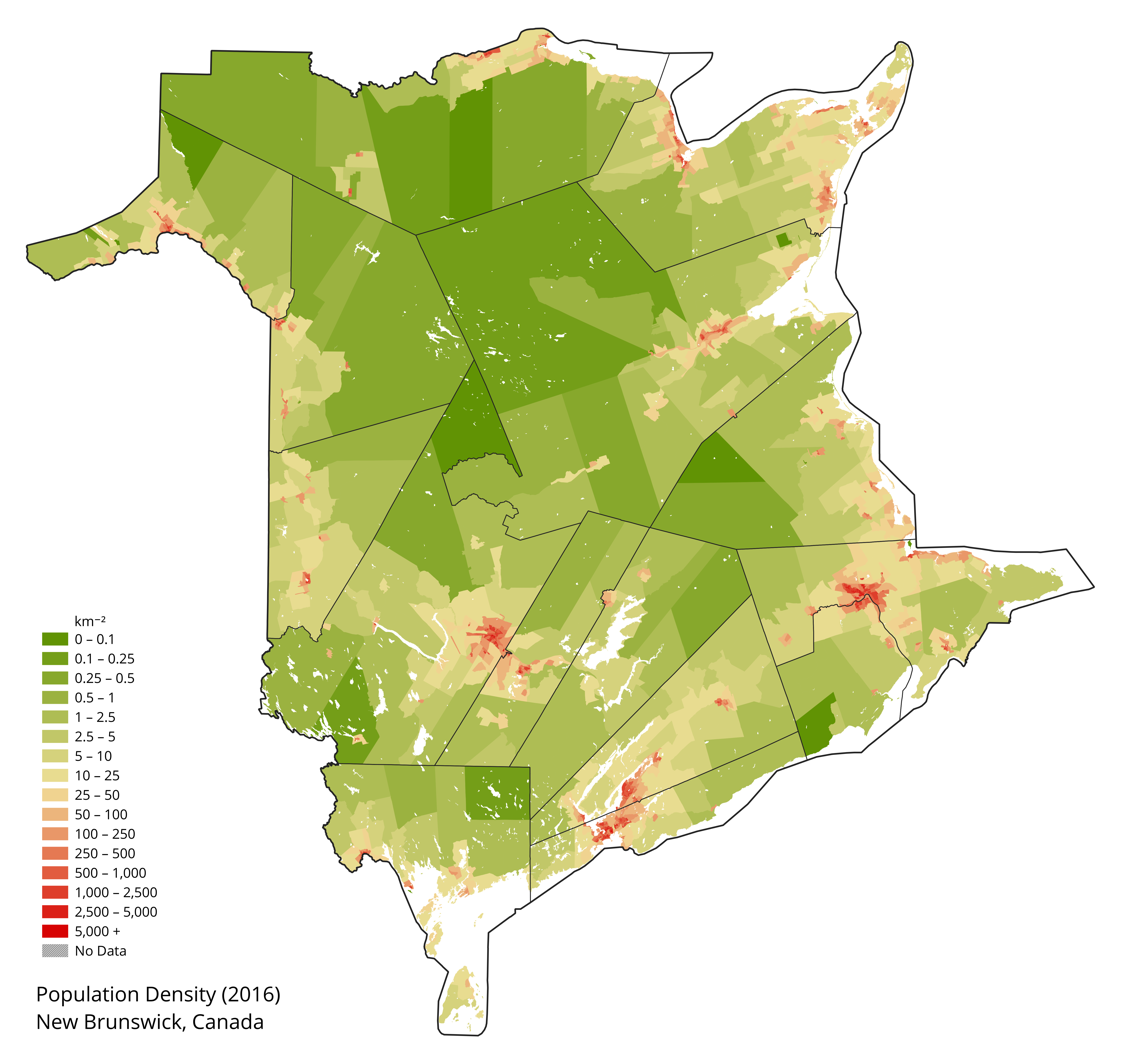
Population Density of New Brunswick in 2016

New Brunswick is one of Canada's three Maritime provinces and the only bilingual province in the country. The provincial Department of Finance estimates that the province's population in 2006 was 729,997 of which the majority is English-speaking but with a substantial French-speaking minority of mostly Acadian origin.

First Nations in New Brunswick include the Mi'kmaq and Wolastoqiyik (Maliseet). The first European settlers, the Acadians are descendants of French settlers and also some of the Indigenous peoples of Acadia, a French colony in modern-day Nova Scotia. The Acadians were expelled by the British in 1755 for refusing to take an oath of allegiance to King George II which drove several thousand Acadian residents into exile in North America, the UK and France during the French and Indian War. (Those American Acadians who wound up in Louisiana, and other parts of the American South, are referred to as Cajuns, although some Cajuns are not of Acadian origin.) In time, some Acadians returned to the Maritime provinces of Canada, mainly to New Brunswick, due to the British prohibiting them from resettling their lands and villages in what became Nova Scotia.

Many of the English-Canadian population of New Brunswick are descended from Loyalists who fled the American Revolution. This is commemorated in the province's motto, Spem reduxit ("hope was restored"). There is also a significant population with Irish ancestry, especially in Saint John and the Miramichi Valley. People of Scottish descent are scattered throughout the province, with high concentrations in the Miramichi and in Campbellton. A small population of Danish origin may be found in New Denmark in the northwest of the province.

== Population history ==
View chart definition.

Year	Population	Five Year % change	Ten Year % change	Rank Among Provinces
1824	74,176	n/a	n/a	n/a
1834	119,457	n/a	61.0	n/a
1841	156,162	n/a	n/a	n/a
1851	193,800	n/a	24.1	n/a
1861	252,047	n/a	30.0	n/a
1871	285,594	n/a	13.3	4
1881	321,233	n/a	12.5	4
1891	321,263	n/a	0.0	4
1901	331,120	n/a	3.1	4
1911	351,889	n/a	6.3	8
1921	387,876	n/a	10.2	8
1931	408,219	n/a	5.2	8
1941	457,401	n/a	12.0	8
1951	515,697	n/a	12.7	8
1956	554,616	7.5	n/a	8
1961	597,936	7.8	15.9	8
1966	616,788	3.2	11.2	8
1971	634,560	2.9	6.9	8
1976	677,250	6.7	9.8	8
1981	696,403	2.8	9.7	8
1986	709,445	1.9	4.8	8
1991	723,900	2.0	3.9	8
1996	738,133	2.0	4.0	8
2001	729,498	-1.2	0.8	8
2006	729,997	0.1	-1.1	8
2011	751,171	2.9	3.0	8
2016	747,101	-0.5	2.3	8
2021	775,610	3.8	3.2	8

Source: Statistics Canada

== Population geography ==
=== City Metropolitan Areas ===
City	2021	2016	2011	2006	Land area (km^{2})	Density (/km^{2})
Greater Moncton	157,717	144,810	138,644	126,424	2,562.47	61.5
Greater Saint John	130,613	126,202	127,761	122,389	3,505.66	37.3
Greater Fredericton	108,610	102,690	94,268	85,688	6,014.66	18.1
Greater Bathurst	31,387	31,110	33,484	34,106	2,100.05	14.9
Greater Miramichi	27,593	27,518	28,115	28,773	7,564.06	3.6
Greater Edmundston	21,144	21,955	21,903	22,471	1,582.36	14.0
Greater Campbellton	13,330	14,679	17,842	17,878	1,525.45	8.7

=== Cities and towns ===
Town	Population (2011)	Population ranking	Land area (km^{2})	Area ranking	Density (/km^{2})	Density ranking
Bathurst	12,275	9	91.86	6	133.6	24
Beresford	4,351	20	19.20	17	226.6	18
Bouctouche	2,423	26	18.34	19	132.1	25
Campbellton	7,385	12	18.66	18	395.7	9
Caraquet	4,169	23	68.26	8	61.1	35
Dalhousie	3,512	24	14.51	23	242.1	17
Dieppe	23,310	4	54.11	11	430.8	6
Edmundston	16,032	8	107.00	5	149.8	23
Florenceville-Bristol	1,639	29	15.61	22	105.0	29
Fredericton	56,224	3	131.67	4	427.0	7
Grand Bay–Westfield	5,117	17	59.86	9	85.5	33
Grand Falls	5,706	14	18.05	20	315.9	13
Hampton	4,292	22	21.00	16	204.3	21
Hartland	947	35	9.63	30	98.4	31
Lamèque	1,432	31	12.45	28	115.1	27
Miramichi	17,811	7	179.93	2	99.0	30
McAdam	1,404	32	14.47	24	97.02	32
Moncton	69,074	2	141.17	3	489.3	2
Nackawic	1,049	34	8.40	32	124.9	26
Oromocto	8,932	11	22.37	15	399.2	8
Quispamsis	17,886	6	57.06	10	313.5	14
Richibucto	1,286	33	11.83	27	108.7	28
Riverview	19,128	5	33.88	13	564.6	1
Rothesay	11,947	10	34.77	12	343.6	12
Sackville	5,558	15	74.32	7	74.8	34
Saint Andrews	1,889	28	8.35	33	226.2	19
Saint John	70,063	1	315.82	1	221.8	20
Saint-Léonard	1,343	32	5.20	34	258.3	16
Saint-Quentin	2,095	27	4.30	35	486.7	3
Shediac	6,053	13	12.50	26	484.4	4
Shippagan	2,603	25	9.94	29	261.9	15
St. George	1,543	30	16.13	21	95.6	32
St. Stephen	4,817	19	13.45	24	358.0	11
Sussex	4,312	21	9.03	31	477.4	5
Tracadie–Sheila	4,933	18	24.65	14	200.1	22
Woodstock	5,254	16	13.41	25	391.7	10

== Ethnic origin ==
The information in the following table contains data from the 2021 Candidan census conducted by Statistics Canada.

Of the 233,000 New Brunswickers whose mother tongue is French, the great majority are Acadians. Most have indicated their ethnic origin as French and not as Acadian, so that the number of Acadians shown is much smaller.

Ethnic origin	2021 population	Percent
Canadian	174,910	23.0%
Irish	155,915	20.5%
English	137,145	18.1%
Scottish	134,350	17.7%
French, n.o.s.(not otherwise specified)	118,205	15.3%
Acadian	108,375	14.3%
German	33,200	4.4%
New Brunswicker	22,365	2.9%
French Canadian	18,650	2.5%
British, n.o.s.	16,630	2.2%
Dutch	13,310	1.8%
First Nations	13,550	1.8%
Mi'kmaq, n.o.s.	12,655	1.7%
European, n.o.s.	11,565	1.5%
Welsh	11,500	1.5%
Métis	9,445	1.2%
Italian	8,255	1.1%
American	7,185	0.9%
North American Indigenous	5,675	0.7%
Québécois	5,415	0.7%
Indian	5,655	0.7%
Filipino	4,960	0.6%
Chinese	4,600	0.6%
Ukrainian	4,600	0.6%
Danish	4,170	0.5%

== Visible minorities and Indigenous peoples ==
Visible minority & Indigenous population in New Brunswick (1986–2021)
Group	Population	2021 census		2016 census		2011 census		2006 census		2001 census		1996 census		1991 census		1986 census	
Group	Population	Pop.	%	Pop.	%	Pop.	%	Pop.	%	Pop.	%	Pop.	%	Pop.	%	Pop.	%
Non-Indigenous / non-visible minority group	British Isles (Note: Including multiple responses.) (Note: 1996-present census populations for British Isles and French origins may be undercounts, due to the creation of the "Canadian" ethnic origin category. All citizens of Canada are classified as "Canadians" as defined by Canada's nationality laws. However, "Canadian" as an ethnic group has since 1996 been added to census questionnaires for possible ancestry. "Canadian" was included as an example on the English questionnaire and "Canadien" as an example on the French questionnaire. "The majority of respondents to this selection are from the eastern part of the country that was first settled. Respondents generally are visibly European (Anglophones and Francophones), however no-longer self identify with their ethnic ancestral origins. This response is attributed to a multitude or generational distance from ancestral lineage. Source 1: Jack Jedwab (April 2008). "Our 'Cense' of Self: the 2006 Census saw 1.6 million 'Canadian' Canadians Return to British and French origins" (PDF). Association for Canadian Studies. p. 2. Archived from the original (PDF) on October 2, 2011. "Virtually all persons who reported "Canadian" in 1996 had English or French as a mother tongue, were born in Canada and had both parents born inside Canada. This suggests that many of these respondents were people whose families have been in this country for several generations. In effect the "new Canadians" were persons that previously reported either British or French origins. Moreover in 1996 some 55% of people with both parents born in Canada reported Canadian (alone or in combination with other origins). By contrast, only 4% of people with both parents born outside Canada reported Canadian. Thus the Canadian response did not appeal widely to either immigrants or their children. Most important however was that nearly half of those persons reporting Canadian origin in 1996 were in Quebec this represented a majority of the mother tongue francophone population[...]In the 2001 Census, 11.7 million people, or 39% of the total population, reported Canadian as their ethnic origin, either alone or in combination with other origins. Some 4.9 million Quebecers out of 7.1 million individuals reported Canadian or "Canadien" thus accounting for nearly seven in ten persons (nearly eighty percent of francophones in Quebec)." Source 2: Don Kerr (2007). The Changing Face of Canada: Essential Readings in Population. Canadian Scholars' Press. pp. 313–317. ISBN 978-1-55130-322-2. Source 3: Jantzen (2006) Footnote 5: Note that Canadian and Canadien have been separated since the two terms mean different things. In English, it usually means someone whose family has been in Canada for multiple generations. In French it is referring to "Les Habitants", settlers of New France during the 17th and 18th centuries who earned their living primarily from agricultural labour. Source 4: Jantzen (2006): The reporting of French New World ancestries (Canadien, Québécois, and French-Canadian) is concentrated in the 4th+ generations; 79% of French-Canadian, 88% of Canadien and 90% of Québécois are in the 4th+generations category. Source 5: Jantzen (2005): According to Table 3, the 4th+ generations are highest because of a strong sense of belonging to their ethnic or cultural group among those respondents reporting the New World ancestries of Canadien and Québécois. Source 6: Jantzen (2006): For respondents of French and New World ancestries the pattern is different. Where generational data is available, it is possible to see that not all respondents reporting these ancestries report a high sense of belonging to their ethnic or cultural group. The high proportions are focused among those respondents that are in the 4th+ generations, and unlike with the British Isles example, the difference between the 2nd and 3rd generations to the 4th+ generation is more pronounced. Since these ancestries are concentrated in the 4th+ generations, their high proportions of sense of belonging to ethnic or cultural group push up the 4th+ generational results.)	312,925	41.22%	314,660	43.06%	353,140	47.99%	332,265	46.17%	302,090	41.97%	358,045	49.07%	435,715	60.81%	442,295	63.02%
Non-Indigenous / non-visible minority group	French	251,335	33.11%	193,550	26.49%	232,915	31.65%	207,160	28.79%	210,680	29.27%	252,130	34.56%	327,370	45.69%	319,555	45.53%
Non-Indigenous / non-visible minority group	Western European	48,735	6.42%	49,830	6.82%	50,725	6.89%	48,960	6.8%	40,550	5.63%	44,440	6.09%	46,050	6.43%	38,920	5.55%
Non-Indigenous / non-visible minority group	European, n.i.e. & n.o.s.	24,915	3.28%	81,510	11.15%	25,815	3.51%	70,035	9.73%	115,185	16%	33,895	4.65%	1,770	0.25%	1,515	0.22%
Non-Indigenous / non-visible minority group	Southern European	16,870	2.22%	13,450	1.84%	12,245	1.66%	11,590	1.61%	9,765	1.36%	8,755	1.2%	7,885	1.1%	5,980	0.85%
Non-Indigenous / non-visible minority group	Northern European	13,705	1.81%	10,400	1.42%	10,405	1.41%	9,610	1.34%	8,705	1.21%	7,860	1.08%	6,515	0.91%	5,565	0.79%
Non-Indigenous / non-visible minority group	Eastern European	13,205	1.74%	11,595	1.59%	10,840	1.47%	9,030	1.25%	6,320	0.88%	6,640	0.91%	6,420	0.9%	5,175	0.74%
Total non-Indigenous / non-visible minority population (Note: Single responses only unless otherwise specified.)		681,690	89.79%	676,795	92.62%	696,085	94.6%	688,650	95.69%	693,295	96.33%	711,765	97.55%	694,340	96.91%	685,215	97.63%
Visible minority (Note: Statistics Canada defines visible minorities as defined in the Employment Equity Act which defines visible minorities as "persons, other than Aboriginal peoples, who are non-Caucasian in race or non-white in colour".) group	Black	12,155	1.6%	6,995	0.96%	4,875	0.66%	4,455	0.62%	3,850	0.53%	3,120	0.43%	2,880	0.4%	2,270	0.32%
Visible minority group	South Asian	8,630	1.14%	2,535	0.35%	2,445	0.33%	1,960	0.27%	1,415	0.2%	1,220	0.17%	980	0.14%	920	0.13%
Visible minority group	Filipino	5,190	0.68%	1,975	0.27%	1,100	0.15%	530	0.07%	355	0.05%	245	0.03%	230	0.03%	245	0.03%
Visible minority group	Arab	5,055	0.67%	2,960	0.41%	1,380	0.19%	840	0.12%	575	0.08%	—N/a	—N/a	—N/a	—N/a	—N/a	—N/a
Visible minority group	Chinese	4,090	0.54%	3,925	0.54%	2,535	0.34%	2,445	0.34%	1,530	0.21%	1,820	0.25%	1,405	0.2%	975	0.14%
Visible minority group	Latin American	2,455	0.32%	1,290	0.18%	1,160	0.16%	715	0.1%	425	0.06%	250	0.03%	300	0.04%	265	0.04%
Visible minority group	Southeast Asian	1,895	0.25%	1,225	0.17%	730	0.1%	440	0.06%	305	0.04%	355	0.05%	270	0.04%	390	0.06%
Visible minority group	Korean	1,650	0.22%	1,685	0.23%	1,850	0.25%	620	0.09%	105	0.01%	25	0%	80	0.01%	65	0.01%
Visible minority group	Multiple visible minorities	1,370	0.18%	675	0.09%	355	0.05%	460	0.06%	275	0.04%	100	0.01%	210	0.03%	80	0.01%
Visible minority group	West Asian	915	0.12%	735	0.1%	305	0.04%	550	0.08%	180	0.03%	—N/a	—N/a	—N/a	—N/a	—N/a	—N/a
Visible minority group	Visible minority, n.i.e.	550	0.07%	305	0.04%	85	0.01%	155	0.02%	265	0.04%	95	0.01%	10	0%	10	0%
Visible minority group	Japanese	250	0.03%	230	0.03%	305	0.04%	165	0.02%	130	0.02%	50	0.01%	140	0.02%	160	0.02%
Visible minority group	Arab/West Asian	—N/a	—N/a	—N/a	—N/a	—N/a	—N/a	—N/a	—N/a	—N/a	—N/a	715	0.1%	2,440	0.34%	1,885	0.27%
Total visible minority population		44,205	5.82%	24,535	3.36%	17,130	2.33%	13,345	1.85%	9,425	1.31%	7,995	1.1%	8,945	1.25%	7,265	1.04%
Indigenous (Note: Statistics Canada defines Indigenous identity as persons who identify with the Indigenous Peoples of Canada.) group	First Nations	20,955	2.76%	17,575	2.41%	16,120	2.19%	12,385	1.72%	11,490	1.6%	8,780	1.2%	11,830 (Note: Including multiple Indigenous responses.)	1.65%	8,520	1.21%
Indigenous group	Métis	10,170	1.34%	10,200	1.4%	4,845	0.66%	4,270	0.59%	4,290	0.6%	950	0.13%	980	0.14%	550	0.08%
Indigenous group	Indigenous responses, n.i.e.	995	0.13%	755	0.1%	1,015	0.14%	710	0.1%	880	0.12%	—N/a	—N/a	—N/a	—N/a	—N/a	—N/a
Indigenous group	Inuk (Inuit)	685	0.09%	385	0.05%	485	0.07%	185	0.03%	160	0.02%	110	0.02%	445	0.06%	120	0.02%
Indigenous group	Multiple Indigenous responses	490	0.06%	475	0.07%	145	0.02%	100	0.01%	165	0.02%	30	0%	—N/a	—N/a	190	0.03%
Total Indigenous population		33,300	4.39%	29,380	4.02%	22,620	3.07%	17,655	2.45%	16,990	2.36%	9,870	1.35%	13,210	1.84%	9,380	1.34%
Total responses		759,195	97.88%	730,710	97.81%	735,835	97.96%	719,650	98.58%	719,710	98.66%	729,630	98.85%	716,495	98.98%	701,860	98.93%
Total population		775,610	100%	747,101	100%	751,171	100%	729,997	100%	729,498	100%	738,133	100%	723,900	100%	709,445	100%

== Languages ==
The province's distribution of English and French is highly regional

Compared to other provinces, New Brunswick has a relatively even split of English and French-speakers.

As a comparison, the minority language communities of Ontario and Quebec (Franco-Ontarians and English-speaking Quebecers respectively) make up less than 10% of those provinces' populations. With both official language communities so strongly represented, New Brunswick is home to English and French-language hospitals, media, schools and universities. The province also has a high proportion of people that speak both languages, with 246,000 people, or 33.2% of the population speaking English and French (though Francophones make up two-thirds of those who are bilingual).

Language policy is a perennial issue in New Brunswick politics and society. Recurring debates have arisen in regards to duality (the system of parallel English and French-speaking public services), interpretation of the provincial bilingualism policy and specifics of implementation. The extent of the provincial policy on bilingualism means that a new row is never far off in the New Brunswick news cycle. Francophones advocate for full funding of French-language public services and fair representation in public sector employment, while Anglophones fear that the system of duality is financially inefficient, its extent is not worthwhile and that the provincial government's targets for bilingualism in public employment are hurting their chances to work for the government, as Anglophones are less likely than Francophones to be proficient enough in both official languages to use them in employment.

The province's bilingual status is enshrined in federal and provincial law. The Canadian Constitution makes specific mention of New Brunswick's bilingual status and defines the spirit of implementation as one based on community and individual rights (in contrast with the constitutional protections for the other provinces that is limited to individuals). The Canadian Charter of Rights and Freedoms has a number of New Brunswick specific articles and makes specific mention of New Brunswick in each section relating to language. Of particular interest is Article 16.1, which declares that New Brunswick's Anglophone and Francophone communities have equal rights and privileges, including community-specific cultural and educational institutions, Article 18.1, declaring bilingual publication of the Canadian Parliament's works and laws and Article 18.2, specifying that the New Brunswick Legislature will publish its works in English and French. Article 16.1's distinction of linguistic community is important in that it recognizes not only the rights of individuals to use their language, but also demands that the two official language communities have their specific institutions upheld.

In 2012, New Brunswick Francophones scored lower on the Programme for the International Assessment of Adult Competencies than their Anglophone counterparts.

=== Knowledge of languages ===
Knowledge of official languages of Canada in New Brunswick (2016)
Language	Percent
English only	57.15%
French only	8.58%
English and French	33.95%
Neither English nor French	0.32%

The question on knowledge of languages allows for multiple responses. The following figures are from the 2021 Canadian Census, and lists languages that were selected by at least 0.5 percent of respondents.

Knowledge of languages in New Brunswick
Language	2021	
Language	Pop.	%
English	698,025	91.94%
French	317,825	41.86%
Spanish	7,580	1%
Arabic	6,090	0.8%
Tagalog	4,225	0.56%

=== Mother tongue ===
New Brunswick's official languages are shown in bold. Figures shown are for the number of single-language responses and the percentage of total single-language responses. During the 19th century Gaelic was also spoken in Campbellton and Dalhousie. The language died out as a natively-spoken language in the early 20th century.

The 2011 Canadian census showed a population of 751,171. Of the 731,855 single responses to the census question concerning mother tongue, the most commonly reported languages were:

Ranking	Language	Population	Percentage
1.	**English**	479,930	65.58%
2.	**French**	233,530	31.90%
3.	Mi'kmaq	2,115	0.29%
4.	Korean	1,810	0.25%
5.	German	1,805	0.25%
6.	Arabic	1,325	0.18%
7.	Spanish	1,135	0.16%
8.	Dutch	925	0.13%
9.	Tagalog	585	0.08%
10.	Persian	450	0.06%
11.	Italian	440	0.06%
12.	Romanian	420	0.06%
13.	Mandarin	405	0.06%
14.	Russian	355	0.05%
15.	Vietnamese	285	0.04%
16.	Polish	255	0.03%
17.	Hindi	250	0.03%
18.	Cantonese	225	0.03%
19.	Portuguese	220	0.03%
20.	Urdu	205	0.03%
21.	Bengali	180	0.02%
22.	Hungarian	155	0.02%
23.	Danish	145	0.02%
24.	Greek	140	0.02%
25.	Swahili	140	0.02%
26.	Serbian	120	0.02%

Note: "n.i.e.": not included elsewhere

There were also 45 single-language responses for Gujarati; 135 for Niger-Congo languages n.i.e.; 70 for Creole; 95 for Non-verbal languages (Sign languages); 115 for Japanese; 30 for Indo-Iranian languages n.i.e.; 5 for Somali; 20 for Sinhala (Sinhalese); and 40 for Malayalam. New Brunswick's official languages are shown in bold. (Figures shown are for the number of single language responses and the percentage of total single-language responses.)

== Religion ==
Religious groups in New Brunswick (1981−2021)
Religious group	2021 Canadian census		2011 Canadian census		2001 Canadian census		1991 Canadian census		1981 Canadian census	
Religious group	Pop.	%	Pop.	%	Pop.	%	Pop.	%	Pop.	%
Christianity	512,645	67.52%	616,910	83.84%	657,865	91.41%	674,780	94.18%	667,610	96.84%
Irreligion	225,125	29.65%	111,435	15.14%	57,665	8.01%	38,740	5.41%	19,685	2.86%
Islam	9,190	1.21%	2,640	0.36%	1,270	0.18%	255	0.04%	315	0.05%
Hinduism	3,340	0.44%	820	0.11%	470	0.07%	610	0.09%	475	0.07%
Sikhism	1,780	0.23%	20	0%	90	0.01%	45	0.01%	50	0.01%
Buddhism	1,120	0.15%	975	0.13%	550	0.08%	365	0.05%	240	0.03%
Indigenous spirituality	1,005	0.13%	525	0.07%	360	0.05%	75	0.01%	40	0.01%
Judaism	1,000	0.13%	620	0.08%	670	0.09%	880	0.12%	845	0.12%
Other	3,990	0.53%	1,895	0.26%	760	0.11%	745	0.1%	110	0.02%
Total responses	759,195	97.88%	735,835	97.96%	719,710	98.66%	716,495	98.98%	689,370	98.99%
Total population	775,610	100%	751,171	100%	729,498	100%	723,900	100%	696,403	100%

== Migration ==
=== Immigration ===
New Brunswick immigration statistics (1851–2021)
Census year	Immigrant percentage	Immigrant population	Total responses	Total population	Source(s)
1851 Census of New Brunswick	20.86%	40,432	193,800	193,800	
1861 Census of New Brunswick	20.87%	52,602	252,047	252,047	
1871 Canadian census	13.96%	39,860	285,594	285,594	
1881 Canadian census	9.67%	31,068	321,233	321,233	
1891 Canadian census	6.85%	22,006	321,263	321,263	
1901 Canadian census	5.42%	17,942	331,120	331,120	
1911 Canadian census	5.2%	18,313	351,889	351,889	
1921 Canadian census	5.53%	21,458	387,876	387,876	
1931 Canadian census	5.98%	24,401	408,219	408,219	
1941 Canadian census	4.5%	20,592	457,401	457,401	
1951 Canadian census	3.85%	19,875	515,697	515,697	
1961 Canadian census	3.89%	23,283	597,936	597,936	
1971 Canadian census	3.74%	23,735	634,555	634,557	
1981 Canadian census	4%	27,580	689,375	696,403	
1986 Canadian census	3.84%	26,955	701,855	709,442	
1991 Canadian census	3.35%	23,975	716,495	723,900	
1996 Canadian census	3.34%	24,380	729,630	738,133	
2001 Canadian census	3.12%	22,470	719,710	729,498	
2006 Canadian census	3.67%	26,400	719,650	729,997	
2011 Canadian census	3.87%	28,465	735,835	751,171	
2016 Canadian census	4.63%	33,810	730,710	747,101	
2021 Canadian census	5.81%	44,125	759,195	775,610	

The 2021 census reported that immigrants (individuals born outside Canada) comprise 44,125 persons or 5.8 percent of the total population of New Brunswick.

Immigrants in New Brunswick by country of birth
Country of birth	2021 census		2016 census		2011 census		2006 census		2001 census		1996 census		1991 census		1986 census		1981 census		1971 census		1961 census		1951 census		1941 census		1931 census	
Country of birth	Pop.	%	Pop.	%	Pop.	%	Pop.	%	Pop.	%	Pop.	%	Pop.	%	Pop.	%	Pop.	%	Pop.	%	Pop.	%	Pop.	%	Pop.	%	Pop.	%
United States	6,480	14.7%	7,615	22.5%	8,225	28.9%	8,655	32.8%	7,960	35.4%	8,925	36.6%	8,385	35%	10,660	39.5%	11,005	39.9%	7,950	33.5%	7,582	32.6%	7,073	35.6%	7,952	38.6%	8,794	36%
United Kingdom	4,915	11.1%	4,605	13.6%	5,260	18.5%	5,210	19.7%	5,300	23.6%	6,410	26.3%	7,365	30.7%	7,545	28%	8,210	29.8%	8,450	35.6%	9,349	40.2%	8,918	44.9%	8,180	39.7%	10,176	41.7%
Philippines	3,780	8.6%	1,340	4%	705	2.5%	350	1.3%	210	0.9%	155	0.6%	125	0.5%	195	0.7%	115	0.4%	—N/a	—N/a	—N/a	—N/a	—N/a	—N/a	—N/a	—N/a	—N/a	—N/a
Syria & Lebanon	2,395 (Note: Syria: 1,890 / Lebanon: 505)	5.4%	1,620 (Note: Syria: 1,230 / Lebanon: 390)	4.8%	285 (Note: Syria: 55 / Lebanon: 230)	1%	240 (Note: Syria: 20 / Lebanon: 220)	0.9%	195 (Note: Syria: 35 / Lebanon: 160)	0.9%	170 (Note: Syria: 10 / Lebanon: 160)	0.7%	195 (Note: Syria: 10 / Lebanon: 185)	0.8%	145 (Note: Syria: 15 / Lebanon: 130)	0.5%	105	0.4%	—N/a	—N/a	—N/a	—N/a	—N/a	—N/a	130	0.6%	175	0.7%
India	2,265	5.1%	820	2.4%	800	2.8%	595	2.3%	390	1.7%	470	1.9%	380	1.6%	315	1.2%	430	1.6%	225	0.9%	63	0.3%	33	0.2%	60	0.3%	50	0.2%
China & Taiwan	2,175 (Note: China: 2,125 / Taiwan: 50)	4.9%	2,295 (Note: China: 2,215 / Taiwan: 80)	6.8%	1,090 (Note: China: 1,050 / Taiwan: 40)	3.8%	980 (Note: China: 925 / Taiwan: 55)	3.7%	525 (Note: China: 490 / Taiwan: 35)	2.3%	595 (Note: China: 525 / Taiwan: 70)	2.4%	390 (Note: China: 355 / Taiwan: 35)	1.6%	350 (Note: China: 320 / Taiwan: 30)	1.3%	290 (Note: China: 150 / Taiwan: 140)	1.1%	315	1.3%	160	0.7%	101	0.5%	118	0.6%	206	0.8%
Germany & Austria	1,505 (Note: Germany: 1,400 / Austria: 110)	3.4%	1,725 (Note: Germany: 1,615 / Austria: 105)	5.1%	1,740 (Note: Germany: 1,650 / Austria: 90)	6.1%	1,865 (Note: Germany: 1,770 / Austria: 95)	7.1%	1,615 (Note: Germany: 1,570 / Austria: 45)	7.2%	1,845 (Note: Germany: 1,745 / Austria: 95)	7.6%	1,520 (Note: Germany: 1,440 / Austria: 80)	6.3%	1,735 (Note: Germany: 1,645 / Austria: 90)	6.4%	2,205 (Note: Germany: 2,085 / Austria: 120)	8%	2,225	9.4%	1,351	5.8%	197	1%	149	0.7%	171	0.7%
France & Belgium	1,340 (Note: France: 1,070 / Belgium: 270)	3%	920 (Note: France: 760 / Belgium: 160)	2.7%	490 (Note: France: 410 / Belgium: 80)	1.7%	480 (Note: France: 320 / Belgium: 160)	1.8%	330 (Note: France: 225 / Belgium: 105)	1%	275 (Note: France: 190 / Belgium: 85)	0.8%	350 (Note: France: 265 / Belgium: 85)	1.1%	510 (Note: France: 345 / Belgium: 165)	1.9%	365 (Note: France: 355 / Belgium: 10)	1.3%	535	2.3%	447	1.9%	214	1.1%	208	1%	246	1%
South Korea	1,180	2.7%	1,495	4.4%	1,620	5.7%	370	1.4%	25	0.1%	10	0%	45	0.2%	45	0.2%	5	0%	—N/a	—N/a	—N/a	—N/a	—N/a	—N/a	—N/a	—N/a	—N/a	—N/a
Ukraine & Russia	1,175 (Note: Ukraine: 705 / Russia: 470)	2.7%	495 (Note: Ukraine: 250 / Russia: 245)	1.5%	200 (Note: Ukraine: 130 / Russia: 70)	0.7%	205 (Note: Ukraine: 115 / Russia: 90)	0.8%	55 (Note: Ukraine: 40 / Russia: 15)	0.2%	75 (Note: Includes total persons born in all republics of the Soviet Union.)	0.3%	95	0.4%	115	0.4%	160	0.6%	165	0.7%	329	1.4%	345	1.7%	351	1.7%	462	1.9%
Nigeria & Ghana	1,035 (Note: Nigeria: 980 / Ghana: 55)	2.3%	180 (Note: Nigeria: 120 / Ghana: 60)	0.5%	55 (Note: Nigeria: 40 / Ghana: 15)	0.2%	70 (Note: Nigeria: 30 / Ghana: 40)	0.3%	70 (Note: Nigeria: 50 / Ghana: 20)	0.3%	70 (Note: Nigeria: 40 / Ghana: 30)	0.3%	85	0.4%	35	0.1%	15	0.1%	—N/a	—N/a	—N/a	—N/a	—N/a	—N/a	—N/a	—N/a	—N/a	—N/a
DR Congo & Cameroon	800 (Note: DR Congo: 615 / Cameroon: 185)	1.8%	370 (Note: DR Congo: 275 / Cameroon: 95)	1.1%	170 (Note: DR Congo: 120 / Cameroon: 50)	0.6%	215 (Note: DR Congo: 195 / Cameroon: 20)	0.8%	30 (Note: DR Congo: 20 / Cameroon: 10)	0.1%	40	0.2%	30	0.1%	20	0.1%	10	0%	—N/a	—N/a	—N/a	—N/a	—N/a	—N/a	—N/a	—N/a	—N/a	—N/a
Netherlands	735	1.7%	970	2.9%	815	2.9%	995	3.8%	815	3.6%	865	3.5%	870	3.6%	1,000	3.7%	805	2.9%	720	3%	997	4.3%	427	2.1%	49	0.2%	62	0.3%
Vietnam	710	1.6%	720	2.1%	430	1.5%	180	0.7%	160	0.7%	300	1.2%	230	1%	350	1.3%	540	2%	—N/a	—N/a	—N/a	—N/a	—N/a	—N/a	—N/a	—N/a	—N/a	—N/a
Egypt	610	1.4%	120	0.4%	160	0.6%	70	0.3%	95	0.4%	80	0.3%	65	0.3%	45	0.2%	40	0.1%	—N/a	—N/a	—N/a	—N/a	—N/a	—N/a	—N/a	—N/a	—N/a	—N/a
Jamaica & Trinidad and Tobago	550 (Note: Jamaica: 395 / Trinidad and Tobago: 155)	1.2%	240 (Note: Jamaica: 125 / Trinidad and Tobago: 115)	0.7%	175 (Note: Jamaica: 60 / Trinidad and Tobago: 115)	0.6%	180 (Note: Jamaica: 75 / Trinidad and Tobago: 105)	0.7%	200 (Note: Jamaica: 60 / Trinidad and Tobago: 140)	0.9%	185 (Note: Jamaica: 110 / Trinidad and Tobago: 75)	0.8%	130 (Note: Jamaica: 65 / Trinidad and Tobago: 65)	0.5%	150 (Note: Jamaica: 70 / Trinidad and Tobago: 80)	0.6%	125	0.5%	55	0.2%	102 (Note: All individuals born in the British West Indies.)	0.4%	83	0.4%	83	0.4%	98	0.4%
Iran	520	1.2%	490	1.4%	230	0.8%	260	1%	165	0.7%	70	0.3%	145	0.6%	30	0.1%	20	0.1%	—N/a	—N/a	—N/a	—N/a	—N/a	—N/a	—N/a	—N/a	—N/a	—N/a
Pakistan	520	1.2%	225	0.7%	170	0.6%	205	0.8%	65	0.3%	65	0.3%	15	0.1%	65	0.2%	80	0.3%	45	0.2%	—N/a	—N/a	—N/a	—N/a	—N/a	—N/a	—N/a	—N/a
Morocco	460	1%	195	0.6%	120	0.4%	70	0.3%	20	0.1%	25	0.1%	10	0%	5	0%	10	0%	—N/a	—N/a	—N/a	—N/a	—N/a	—N/a	—N/a	—N/a	—N/a	—N/a
Romania	440	1%	485	1.4%	265	0.9%	165	0.6%	115	0.5%	125	0.5%	45	0.2%	60	0.2%	55	0.2%	65	0.3%	57	0.2%	45	0.2%	69	0.3%	54	0.2%
Algeria & Tunisia	420 (Note: Algeria: 230 / Tunisia: 190)	1%	275 (Note: Algeria: 165 / Tunisia: 110)	0.8%	120 (Note: Algeria: 55 / Tunisia: 65)	0.4%	100 (Note: Algeria: 65 / Tunisia: 35)	0.4%	105 (Note: Algeria: 95 / Tunisia: 10)	0.5%	35 (Note: Algeria: 15 / Tunisia: 20)	0.1%	110	0.5%	55	0.2%	25	0.1%	—N/a	—N/a	—N/a	—N/a	—N/a	—N/a	—N/a	—N/a	—N/a	—N/a
Mexico	345	0.8%	160	0.5%	170	0.6%	70	0.3%	75	0.3%	50	0.2%	15	0.1%	10	0%	0	0%	—N/a	—N/a	—N/a	—N/a	—N/a	—N/a	—N/a	—N/a	—N/a	—N/a
Israel & Palestine	360 (Note: Israel: 340 / Palestine: 20)	0.8%	255 (Note: Israel: 235 / Palestine: 20)	0.8%	30 (Note: Israel: 30 / Palestine: 0)	0.1%	30 (Note: Israel: 10 / Palestine: 20)	0.1%	25 (Note: Israel: 10 / Palestine: 15)	0.1%	15	0%	20	0.1%	10	0%	20	0.1%	—N/a	—N/a	—N/a	—N/a	—N/a	—N/a	—N/a	—N/a	—N/a	—N/a
Former Yugoslavia	345	0.8%	270	0.8%	290	1%	355	1.3%	335	1.5%	190	0.8%	80	0.3%	85	0.3%	85	0.3%	45	0.2%	71	0.3%	20	0.1%	14	0.1%	5	0%
United Arab Emirates	320	0.7%	40	0.1%	0	0%	10	0%	15	0.1%	0	0%	—N/a	—N/a	—N/a	—N/a	—N/a	—N/a	—N/a	—N/a	—N/a	—N/a	—N/a	—N/a	—N/a	—N/a	—N/a	—N/a
Australia & New Zealand	310	0.7%	205	0.6%	165	0.6%	135	0.5%	105	0.5%	135	0.6%	130	0.5%	170	0.6%	105	0.4%	55	0.2%	52	0.2%	49	0.2%	46	0.2%	27	0.1%
Italy	305	0.7%	205	0.6%	235	0.8%	405	1.5%	335	1.5%	260	1.1%	370	1.5%	425	1.6%	340	1.2%	335	1.4%	382	1.6%	142	0.7%	101	0.5%	112	0.5%
Bangladesh	305	0.7%	105	0.3%	90	0.3%	60	0.2%	35	0.2%	15	0.1%	0	0%	30	0.1%	10	0%	—N/a	—N/a	—N/a	—N/a	—N/a	—N/a	—N/a	—N/a	—N/a	—N/a
South Africa	300	0.7%	165	0.5%	155	0.5%	125	0.5%	130	0.6%	80	0.3%	60	0.3%	60	0.2%	35	0.1%	—N/a	—N/a	39	0.2%	12	0.1%	28	0.1%	29	0.1%
Kenya & Tanzania & Uganda	265 (Note: Kenya: 80 / Tanzania: 70 / Uganda: 115)	0.6%	195 (Note: Kenya: 60 / Tanzania: 70 / Uganda: 65)	0.6%	130 (Note: Kenya: 70 / Tanzania: 40 / Uganda: 20)	0.5%	90 (Note: Kenya: 55 / Tanzania: 10 / Uganda: 25)	0.3%	105 (Note: Kenya: 65 / Tanzania: 10 / Uganda: 30)	0.5%	65 (Note: Kenya: 30 / Tanzania: 10 / Uganda: 25)	0.3%	110 (Note: Kenya: 30 / Tanzania: 10 / Uganda: 70)	0.5%	95 (Note: Kenya: 25 / Tanzania: 10 / Uganda: 60)	0.4%	120	0.4%	—N/a	—N/a	—N/a	—N/a	—N/a	—N/a	—N/a	—N/a	—N/a	—N/a
Haiti	260	0.6%	170	0.5%	230	0.8%	90	0.3%	45	0.2%	65	0.3%	25	0.1%	50	0.2%	25	0.1%	—N/a	—N/a	—N/a	—N/a	—N/a	—N/a	—N/a	—N/a	—N/a	—N/a
Colombia	250	0.6%	215	0.6%	400	1.4%	175	0.7%	105	0.5%	15	0.1%	15	0.1%	30	0.1%	—N/a	—N/a	—N/a	—N/a	—N/a	—N/a	—N/a	—N/a	—N/a	—N/a	—N/a	—N/a
Brazil	240	0.5%	55	0.2%	50	0.2%	15	0.1%	20	0.1%	15	0.1%	30	0.1%	10	0%	5	0%	—N/a	—N/a	—N/a	—N/a	—N/a	—N/a	—N/a	—N/a	—N/a	—N/a
Scandinavia (Note: Includes Denmark, Finland, Iceland, Norway and Sweden.)	220	0.5%	145	0.4%	175	0.6%	240	0.9%	295	1.3%	205	0.8%	340	1.4%	395	1.5%	400	1.5%	535	2.3%	587	2.5%	640	3.2%	714	3.5%	1,000	4.1%
Poland	215	0.5%	195	0.6%	145	0.5%	125	0.5%	180	0.8%	155	0.6%	220	0.9%	200	0.7%	185	0.7%	295	1.2%	245	1.1%	240	1.2%	218	1.1%	187	0.8%
Sudan & South Sudan	180	0.4%	50	0.1%	20	0.1%	30	0.1%	40	0.2%	0	0%	0	0%	0	0%	—N/a	—N/a	—N/a	—N/a	—N/a	—N/a	—N/a	—N/a	—N/a	—N/a	—N/a	—N/a
Ireland	170	0.4%	160	0.5%	150	0.5%	140	0.5%	225	1%	290	1.2%	150	0.6%	270	1%	120	0.4%	270	1.1%	733	3.1%	927	4.7%	817	4%	1,212	5%
Jordan	170	0.4%	135	0.4%	25	0.1%	50	0.2%	10	0%	10	0%	—N/a	—N/a	—N/a	—N/a	—N/a	—N/a	—N/a	—N/a	—N/a	—N/a	—N/a	—N/a	—N/a	—N/a	—N/a	—N/a
Burundi	165	0.4%	85	0.3%	35	0.1%	25	0.1%	10	0%	10	0%	—N/a	—N/a	—N/a	—N/a	—N/a	—N/a	—N/a	—N/a	—N/a	—N/a	—N/a	—N/a	—N/a	—N/a	—N/a	—N/a
Nepal	155	0.4%	85	0.3%	50	0.2%	20	0.1%	0	0%	20	0.1%	—N/a	—N/a	—N/a	—N/a	—N/a	—N/a	—N/a	—N/a	—N/a	—N/a	—N/a	—N/a	—N/a	—N/a	—N/a	—N/a
Iraq	150	0.3%	70	0.2%	25	0.1%	30	0.1%	0	0%	25	0.1%	0	0%	15	0.1%	—N/a	—N/a	—N/a	—N/a	—N/a	—N/a	—N/a	—N/a	—N/a	—N/a	—N/a	—N/a
Hong Kong	150	0.3%	120	0.4%	105	0.4%	55	0.2%	130	0.6%	200	0.8%	230	1%	100	0.4%	150	0.5%	—N/a	—N/a	—N/a	—N/a	—N/a	—N/a	—N/a	—N/a	—N/a	—N/a
Sri Lanka	150	0.3%	40	0.1%	25	0.1%	75	0.3%	55	0.2%	40	0.2%	15	0.1%	10	0%	10	0%	—N/a	—N/a	—N/a	—N/a	—N/a	—N/a	—N/a	—N/a	—N/a	—N/a
Ethiopia & Eritrea	145 (Note: Ethiopia: 80 / Eritrea: 65)	0.3%	175 (Note: Ethiopia: 125 / Eritrea: 50)	0.5%	75 (Note: Ethiopia: 75 / Eritrea: 0)	0.3%	55 (Note: Ethiopia: 45 / Eritrea: 10)	0.2%	50 (Note: Ethiopia: 25 / Eritrea: 25)	0.2%	40	0.2%	15	0.1%	20	0.1%	—N/a	—N/a	—N/a	—N/a	—N/a	—N/a	—N/a	—N/a	—N/a	—N/a	—N/a	—N/a
Saudi Arabia	145	0.3%	65	0.2%	0	0%	25	0.1%	15	0.1%	0	0%	—N/a	—N/a	—N/a	—N/a	—N/a	—N/a	—N/a	—N/a	—N/a	—N/a	—N/a	—N/a	—N/a	—N/a	—N/a	—N/a
El Salvador & Guatemala & Nicaragua	140 (Note: El Salvador: 70 / Guatemala: 45 / Nicaragua: 25)	0.3%	200 (Note: El Salvador: 115 / Guatemala: 75 / Nicaragua: 10)	0.6%	40 (Note: El Salvador: 30 / Guatemala: 10 / Nicaragua: 0)	0.1%	245 (Note: El Salvador: 150 / Guatemala: 85 / Nicaragua: 10)	0.9%	115 (Note: El Salvador: 65 / Guatemala: 35 / Nicaragua: 15)	0.5%	80 (Note: El Salvador: 60 / Guatemala: 10 / Nicaragua: 10)	0.3%	110 (Note: El Salvador: 90 / Guatemala: 10 / Nicaragua: 10)	0.5%	15 (Note: El Salvador: 10 / Guatemala: 0 / Nicaragua: 5)	0.1%	25	0.1%	—N/a	—N/a	—N/a	—N/a	—N/a	—N/a	—N/a	—N/a	—N/a	—N/a
Turkey	140	0.3%	100	0.3%	20	0.1%	55	0.2%	20	0.1%	70	0.3%	35	0.1%	30	0.1%	5	0%	—N/a	—N/a	—N/a	—N/a	—N/a	—N/a	9	0%	3	0%
Portugal	135	0.3%	130	0.4%	95	0.3%	95	0.4%	70	0.3%	150	0.6%	125	0.5%	140	0.5%	180	0.7%	80	0.3%	—N/a	—N/a	—N/a	—N/a	—N/a	—N/a	—N/a	—N/a
Hungary	115	0.3%	100	0.3%	95	0.3%	165	0.6%	110	0.5%	130	0.5%	185	0.8%	160	0.6%	210	0.8%	170	0.7%	243	1%	37	0.2%	55	0.3%	50	0.2%
Greece	70	0.2%	95	0.3%	80	0.3%	140	0.5%	95	0.5%	125	0.5%	145	0.6%	120	0.4%	205	0.7%	130	0.5%	65	0.3%	40	0.2%	33	0.2%	41	0.2%
Total immigrants	44,125	5.8%	33,810	4.6%	28,465	3.9%	26,400	3.7%	22,470	3.1%	24,380	3.3%	23,975	3.3%	26,955	3.8%	27,580	4%	23,735	3.7%	23,283	3.9%	19,875	3.9%	20,592	4.5%	24,401	6%
Total responses	759,195	97.9%	730,710	97.8%	735,835	98%	719,650	98.6%	719,710	98.7%	729,630	98.8%	716,495	99%	701,855	98.9%	689,375	99%	634,555	100%	597,936	100%	515,697	100%	457,401	100%	408,219	100%
Total population	775,610	100%	747,101	100%	751,171	100%	729,997	100%	729,498	100%	738,133	100%	723,900	100%	709,442	100%	696,403	100%	634,557	100%	597,936	100%	515,697	100%	457,401	100%	408,219	100%

=== Recent immigration ===
The 2021 Canadian census counted a total of 16,040 people who immigrated to New Brunswick between 2016 and 2021.

Recent immigrants to New Brunswick by country of birth (2016 to 2021)
Country of birth	Population	% recent immigrants
Philippines	2,325	14.5%
Syria	1,700	10.6%
India	1,365	8.5%
China	975	6.1%
Nigeria	905	5.6%
United States	605	3.8%
Ukraine	475	3%
Egypt	445	2.8%
France	390	2.4%
Democratic Republic of the Congo	370	2.3%
Vietnam	315	2%
Morocco	275	1.7%
United Kingdom	255	1.6%
South Korea	255	1.6%
United Arab Emirates	245	1.5%
Pakistan	220	1.4%
Mexico	200	1.2%
Jamaica	200	1.2%
Russia	195	1.2%
Bangladesh	190	1.2%
Israel	185	1.2%
Iran	165	1%
Sudan	160	1%
Brazil	155	1%
Algeria	140	0.9%
Total recent immigrants	16,040	100%

=== Interprovincial migration ===
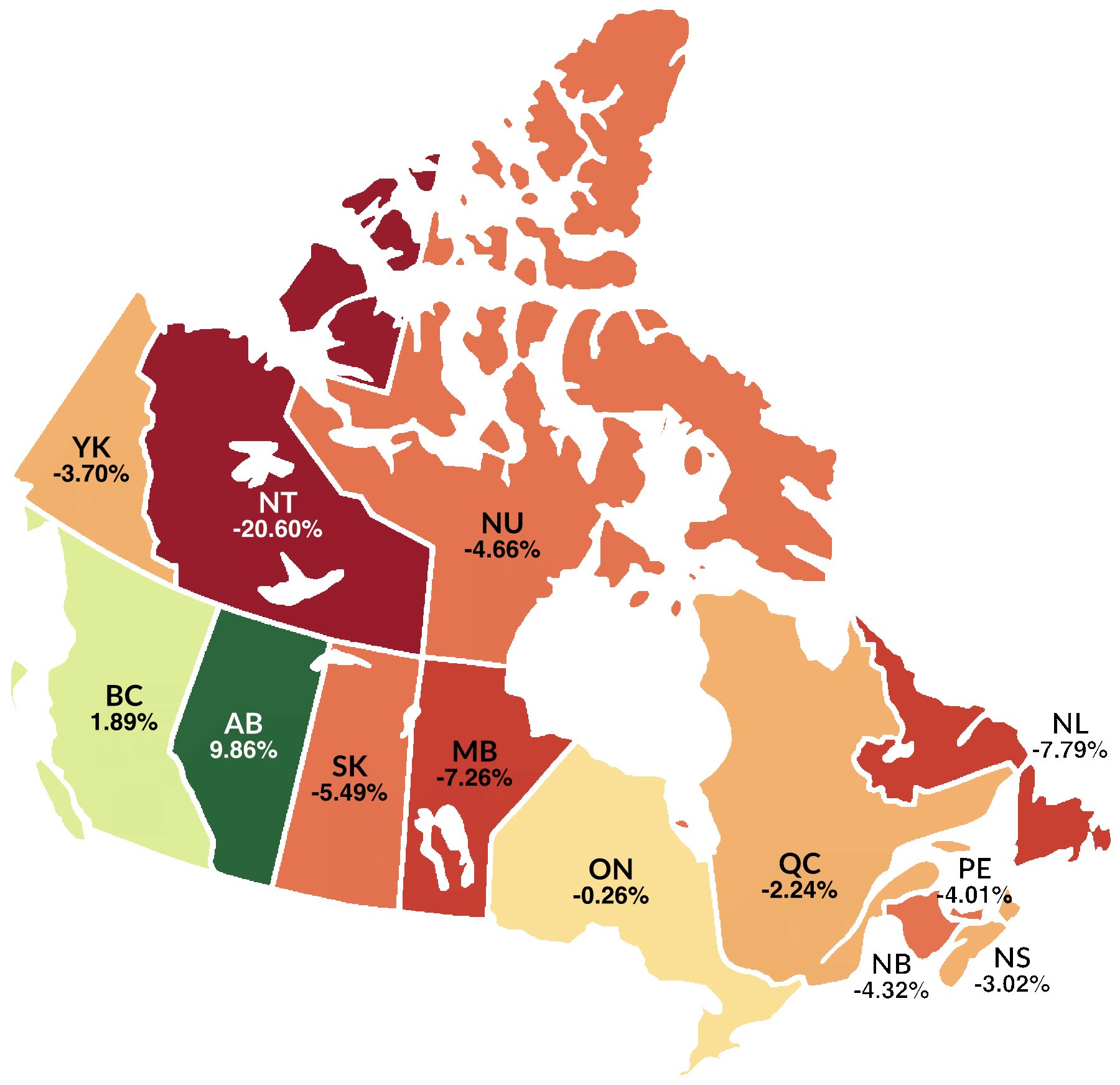
Net cumulative interprovincial migration per Province from 1997 to 2017, as a share of population of each Provinces

New Brunswick has typically experienced less emigration than its size and economic situation would suggest, probably because of the low rate of emigration of its francophone population.

Interprovincial migration in New Brunswick
	In-migrants	Out-migrants	Net migration
2008–09	11,268	11,505	−237
2009–10	10,883	10,312	571
2010–11	10,167	10,325	−158
2011–12	10,044	11,850	−1,806
2012–13	8,517	11,807	−3,290
2013–14	9,055	12,572	−3,517
2014–15	9,184	11,974	−2,790
2015–16	10,248	11,361	−1,113
2016–17	10,136	9,702	434
2017–18	10,709	10,228	481
2018–19	11,945	11,339	606

Source: Statistics Canada

== See also ==
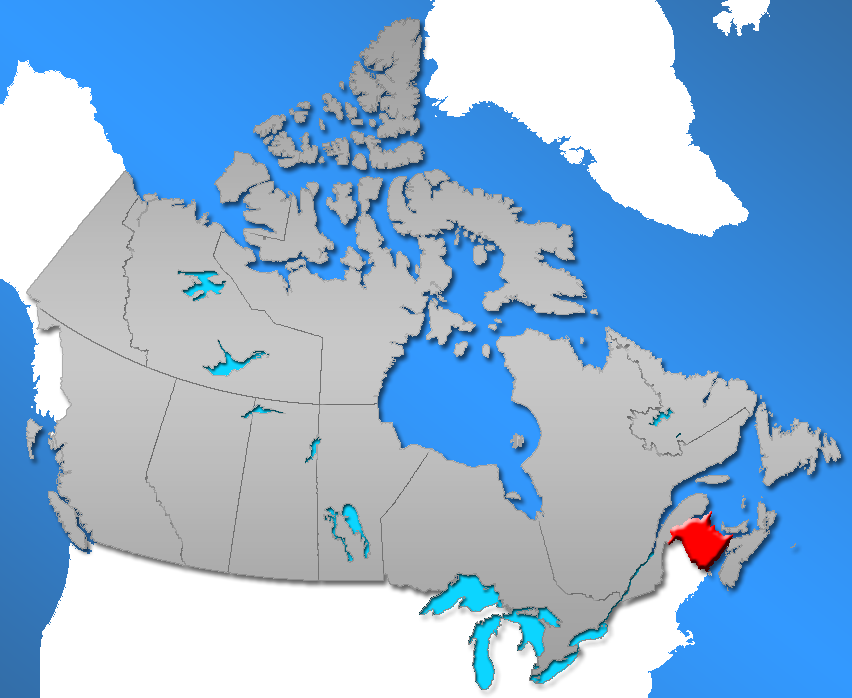
Demographics of Canada's provinces and territories
- Demographics of Canada
- Population of Canada by province and territory
