= James Murray Beck =

Canadian historian (1914–2011)

James Murray Beck CM FRSC
- Born: 1914; Lunenburg, Nova Scotia, Canada
- Died: 30 June 2011 (aged 96–97); Halifax, Nova Scotia, Canada
- Occupations: Historian; writer; professor
- Awards: Fellow of the Royal Society of Canada (1976); Order of Canada (1995); Queen Elizabeth II Golden Jubilee Medal (2002)

James Murray Beck CM FRSC (1914 – 30 June 2011) was a Canadian historian from Nova Scotia. Born in Lunenburg, Beck taught for 17 years at Dalhousie University where he became professor emeritus. He was elected as a Fellow of the Royal Society of Canada in 1976, and was appointed to the Order of Canada in 1995. Beck extensively covered the Nova Scotia politician Joseph Howe in his research, publishing a complete account of his life across two volumes in 1984. He died in Halifax at the age of 96.

== Biography ==
Beck was born in 1914 in Lunenburg, Nova Scotia to parents Allan Clyde and Florence Beck. He served with the Royal Canadian Air Force as a radar mechanic and officer during the Second World War. He attended Acadia University and the University of Toronto, where he earned his Doctor of Philosophy (PhD). After earning his PhD, Beck went on to teach at Acadia and the Royal Military College of Canada, and taught for 17 years at Dalhousie University where he became professor emeritus.

In the 1960s, Beck authored a report on the viability of the Maritime Union, a proposed political union of the three Maritime provinces of Canada. The report was commissioned as part of a study group led by John James Deutsch. From 1967 to 1969, Beck served as a constitutional advisor to the Nova Scotia provincial government under Premier George Isaac Smith.

In 1976, Beck was elected as a Fellow of the Royal Society of Canada. He received the Confederation of Canada Medal in 1992, was appointed to the Order of Canada in 1995, and received the Queen Elizabeth II Golden Jubilee Medal in 2002. He was elected as a fellow of the Royal Nova Scotia Historical Society in 2004.

Over the course of his career, Beck extensively covered the Nova Scotia politician Joseph Howe. The earliest was Joseph Howe: Voice of Nova Scotia in 1964, a book published by McClelland and Stewart, followed by Joseph Howe, Anti-Confederate, a booklet in a series published by the Canadian Historical Association. In 1984, he released a complete account of Howe's life across two volumes: Joseph Howe Volume I: Conservative Reformer, 1804-1848, and Joseph Howe Volume II: The Briton Becomes Canadian, 1848-1873, both published by McGill–Queen's University Press. Beck contributed 50 entries on Nova Scotians to the Dictionary of Canadian Biography, and wrote a variety of other reviews and articles regarding Canadian history.

Beck died on 30 June 2011 at Drummond Hall in Halifax, Nova Scotia. He was 96 years old.

== Publications ==
- Beck, J. Murray (1957). The Government of Nova Scotia. Toronto, ON: University of Toronto Press. ISBN 978-1-4426-3343-8. JSTOR 10.3138/j.ctt15jjc5v. OCLC 500449.
- — (1964). Joseph Howe: Voice of Nova Scotia. Toronto, ON: McClelland and Stewart. OCLC 876200261.
- — (1968). Pendulum of Power: Canada's Federal Elections. Scarborough, ON: Prentice-Hall of Canada. OCLC 443299.
- — (1968). Joseph Howe, Anti-Confederate (PDF). Ottawa, ON: Canadian Historical Association. OCLC 15379505.
- — (1969). The History of Maritime Union: A Study in Frustration. Fredericton, NB: Maritime Union Study. OCLC 130219.
- — (1971). The Shaping of Canadian Federalism: Central Authority or Provincial Right?. Toronto, ON: Copp Publishing Company. OCLC 606392916.
- — (1973). The Evolution of Municipal Government in Nova Scotia, 1749-1973. Halifax, NS: Royal Commission on Education, Public Services and Provincial-Municipal Relations. OCLC 872550935.
- — (1984). Joseph Howe Volume I: Conservative Reformer, 1804-1848. Montreal, QC: McGill–Queen's University Press. ISBN 978-0-7735-6082-6. OCLC 779365145.
- — (1984). Joseph Howe Volume II: The Briton Becomes Canadian, 1848-1873. Montreal, QC: McGill–Queen's University Press. ISBN 978-0-7735-6083-3. OCLC 779365155.
- — (1985). Politics of Nova Scotia: Volume One: Nicholson-Fielding, 1710-1896. Tantallon, N.S.: Four East Publications. ISBN 978-0-9204-2729-3.
- — (1985). Politics of Nova Scotia: Volume Two: Murray-Buchanan, 1896-1988. Tantallon, N.S.: Four East Publications. ISBN 978-0-9204-2704-0. OCLC 499266716.
