= Margaret Conrad =

Canadian historian

Margaret Rose Conrad
- Born: 1946 (age 79–80); Bridgewater, Nova Scotia
- Occupation: Historian
- Awards: Order of Canada

Margaret Rose Conrad OC FRSC (born 1946) is a Canadian historian specializing in the fields of Atlantic Canada and Women's history. She held the Canada Research Chair in Atlantic Canada Studies at the University of New Brunswick before retiring in 2009.

== Career ==
Born in Bridgewater, Nova Scotia, she received a Bachelor of Arts degree in history from Acadia University in 1967, a Master of Arts degree in 1968, and a Ph.D. in 1979 both from the University of Toronto. After a brief stint as an editor at Clarke, Irwin Publishing Company from 1968 to 1969, she joined the Department of History Acadia University in 1969. She was made a full professor in 1987 and was Head of Department from 1992 to 1995. In 2002, she was awarded for a seven-year term a Canada Research Chair in Atlantic Canada Studies at University of New Brunswick. From 1991 to 2002, she was also an adjunct professor at Dalhousie University. From 1996 to 1998, she held the Nancy's Chair of Women's Studies at Mount Saint Vincent University.

Conrad retired from academic life in 2009, and in 2010 was named professor emerita by the University of New Brunswick.

In 1995, Conrad was elected a Fellow of the Royal Society of Canada. In 2004, she was made an Officer of the Order of Canada. In 2002, she was awarded the Queen's Golden Jubilee Medal and in 2012 the Queen's Diamond Jubilee Medal.

== Scholarship ==
Conrad has been primarily a political historian of Canada, writing political biography and studying political cartoons. Much of her focuses been on Atlantic historiography, and editions of primary source documents. She was a pioneer in women's history, and has co-authored numerous textbooks. She is a frequent commentator on current events involving politics and women's issues.

== Selected publications ==
- A Concise History of Canada (Cambridge and New York: Cambridge U.P. 2012)
- Atlantic Canada: A Region in the Making with James K. Hiller (Toronto: Oxford University Press, 2001)
- George Nowlan: Maritime Conservative in National Politics (Toronto: University of Toronto Press, 1986)
- No Place Like Home: The Diaries and Letters of Nova Scotia Women with Toni Laidlaw and Donna Smyth (Halifax: Formac, 1988)
- History of the Canadian Peoples with Alvin Finkel (Toronto: Copp Clark/Addison Wesley, 1993/1998/2002/2008)
- Saturday's Child: The Memoirs of Ellen Louks Fairclough, Canada's First Female Federal Cabinet Minister as editor (Toronto: University of Toronto Press, 1995)
- coeditor, Canadians and Their Pasts (University of Toronto Press, 2013)
