= Helen L. Webster =

American philologist and educator

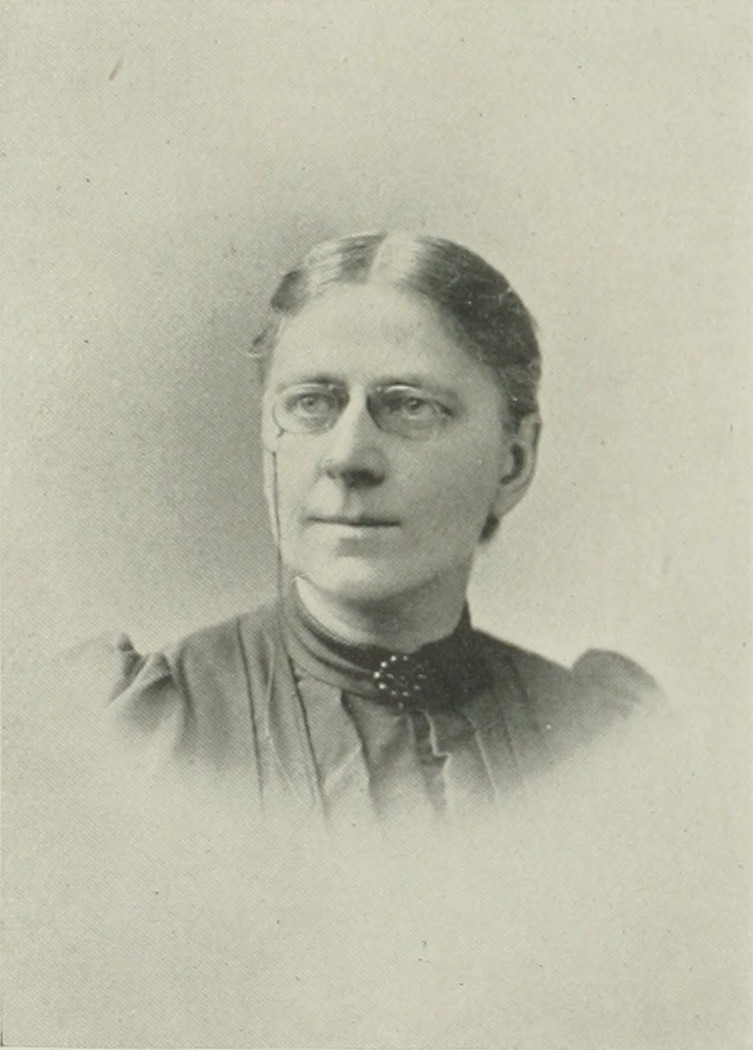
"A Woman of the Century"

Helen L. Webster (August 1, 1853 – January 4, 1928) was an American philologist and educator. She taught at Vassar College, 1889–90, at the same time giving a course of lectures on comparative philology at Barnard College. She served as professor of comparative philology at Wellesley College. 1890–9; and was the principal of the Wilkes-Barre, Pennsylvania Institute, 1899–1904. Webster was the author of: A Treatise on the Guttural Question in Gothic (doctoral dissertation). She edited, The Legends of the Micmacs, 1893. Additionally, she lectured and contributed to educational periodicals. Webster made her home in Farmington, Connecticut.

== Biography ==
Helen Livermore Webster was born in Boston, Massachusetts, August 1, 1853. In her childhood, her family removed to Salem, Massachusetts.

Webster was educated in the public schools of Salem, and graduated in the normal school of that city.

After graduation, she taught for several years in the high school in Lynn, Massachusetts, during which time she kept up a course of study with a tutor in Boston. She aimed to win recognition, which would give her equal standing with regularly graduated collegians, as she was unable to take a college course. In her private studies, she was preparing to take the examinations of the University of London, England. When ready to sail for England, she was detained at home by illness in her family. Afterwards, she went to Zürich, where she entered the University of Zurich. She studied there for more than three years, and she passed with the highest credit the examinations for the degree of Ph.D. (1889). The examinations covered the comparative grammar of Sanskrit, Greek, Latin, Gothic, Anglo-Saxon, Old Norse, Old and Middle High German, and German literature. She handed in to the faculty a dissertation, entitled Zur Gutturalfrage im Gotischen, which attracted general comment by its wide research and scholarly handling. After receiving her degree, she traveled in Europe for a time.

In 1889, she returned to the United States, and, in the winter of that year, lectured in Barnard College, in New York City. During the last half of that college year, she taught at Vassar College. In 1890, the chair of comparative philology was established in Wellesley College, and she was called to fill it, remaining until 1899.

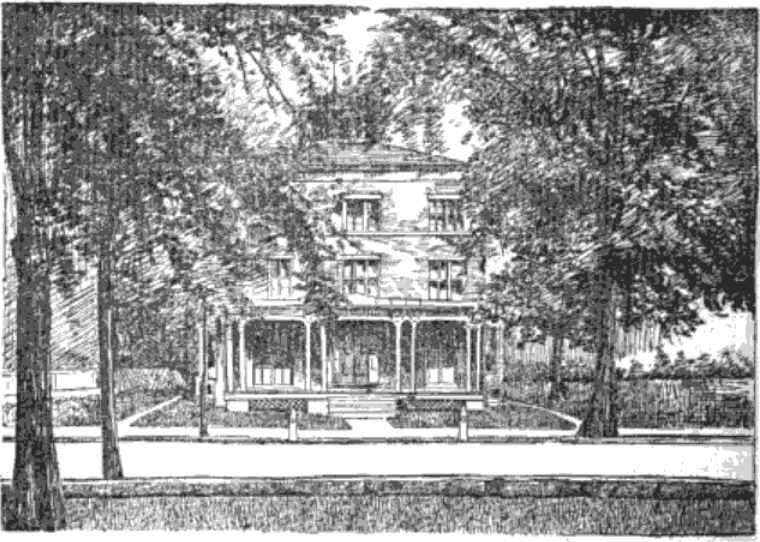
Wilkes-Barre Institute

Webster read her paper entitled, "The Education of the Future" at the National Woman's Council at Atlanta, Georgia, October 1895. From 1899 to 1904, she served as the principal of the Wilkes-Barre Institute, a home and day school for girls and young women including Academic, Intermediate, Primary, and Kindergarten departments. Subsequent positions included teaching at Miss Porter's school in Farmington, Connecticut, and then philologist and academic head at the National Cathedral School for Girls, Washington, D.C.

After being ill for several months, Webster died in Washington, D.C., on January 4, 1928. She left an estate valued at US$100,000.
