= John G. Reid =

Canadian historian

John G. Reid FRSC is a Canadian historian. The principal focus of his work is on the history of early modern northeastern North America (focusing especially on imperial-aboriginal issues in Acadia/Nova Scotia and northern New England), the history of Atlantic Canada, and the history of higher education. According to historian Geoffrey Plank, "No active historian studying the 17th and 18th century Maritime region has produced a richer or more varied body of scholarship than John G. Reid." He was also an expert witness in a number of court cases, including the Mi’kmaw and Wulstukwiuk treaty rights case R. v. Donald Marshall Junior (See R v. Simon).

== Career ==
John Reid was born in Scotland and grew up in the north of England. He was awarded his Ph.D. in 1976 at the University of New Brunswick and began to teach at Saint Mary's University in 1985, becoming a full professor in 1989. He is a Fellow of the Royal Society of Canada, elected in 2004. Reid has served on the Council of the Canadian Historical Association and on the editorial board of the Canadian Historical Review. He is currently Co-editor of Acadiensis: Journal of the History of the Atlantic Region, and is a board member of two other historical journals and of the Atlantic Canada Portal. He has also lectured internationally, and in 2008 held the Shastri Indo-Canadian Institute Visiting Lectureship in India. Reid later became the President of the Shastri Indo-Canadian Institute from the year 2019 to 2020.

According to Geoffrey Plank, for most of the 20th century, historians debated the meaning of the period between 1690 and 1713 by concentrating on relations between the various colonial inhabitants of the Maritime region and the New Englanders. Reid's work breaks out of that frame of reference by emphasizing imperial influences and the persistent power of Aboriginal peoples. Equally importantly, Reid respects all the players, by considering events from several perspectives at once.

In particular, Reid's work has been pivotal in re-conceptualizing the area now known as the Maritime Provinces and northern New England as a single region. He argues this zone, which he calls northeastern North America, was dominated by Algonkians at the beginning of the 18th century except in a few geographically limited zones of colonial settlement. Reid establishes how this geopolitical pattern established in the 17th century may have persisted in Nova Scotia into the 1780s.

== Awards ==
- Ste Marie Prize in Canadian History (1976)
- Gilbert Chinard Prize, Society for French Historical Studies (1981)
- Fellow, Royal Society of Canada (2004)
- Clio Award, Canadian Historical Association (2009)
- Harryman Dorsey Award, Society of Colonial Wars in the District of Columbia
- Keith Matthews Prize, Canadian Nautical Research Society
- Regional History Certificate of Merit, Canadian Historical Association

== Selected publications ==
- Revisiting 1759: The Conquest of Canada in Historical Perspective. Toronto: University of Toronto Press, 2012. Co-edited with Phillip Buckner.
- Remembering 1759: The Conquest of Canada in Historical Memory. Toronto: University of Toronto Press, 2012. Co-edited with Phillip Buckner.
- "Imperial-Aboriginal Friendship in Eighteenth-century Mi’kma’ki/Wulstukwik." In Jerry Bannister and Liam Riordan, eds., The Loyal Atlantic: Remaking the British Atlantic in the Revolutionary Era (Toronto: *University of Toronto Press, 2012), pp. 75–102.
- Shaping an Agenda for Atlantic Canada. Halifax and Winnipeg: Fernwood Publishing, 2011. Co-edited with Donald J. Savoie.
- Nova Scotia: A Pocket History. Halifax: Fernwood Publishing, 2009.
- Reid, John G. (2009). "Empire, the Maritime Colonies, and the Supplanting of Mi'kma'ki/Wulstukwik, 1780-1820". Acadiensis. 38 (2): 78–97. JSTOR 41501739.
- Reid, John G. (2008). Essays on Northeastern North America, Seventeenth and Eighteenth Centuries. University of Toronto Press. pp. 129–152. doi:10.3138/9781442688032. ISBN 978-0-8020-9137-6. JSTOR 10.3138/9781442688032. With contributions by Emerson W. Baker. Recipient of Clio Award, Canadian Historical Association.
- Basque, Maurice; Mancke, Elizabeth; Reid, John G. (2004). Reid, John G.; Basque, Maurice; Mancke, Elizabeth; Moody, Barry; Plank, Geoffrey; Wicken, William (eds.). The "Conquest" of Acadia, 1710: Imperial, Colonial, and Aboriginal Constructions. University of Toronto Press. doi:10.3138/9781442680883. ISBN 978-0-8020-8538-2. JSTOR 10.3138/9781442680883.
- "Pax Britannica or Pax Indigena? Planter Nova Scotia (1760-1782) and Competing Strategies of Pacification." Canadian Historical Review, 85 (2004), 669–92.
- Baker, Emerson W.; Reid, John G. (January 2004). "Amerindian Power in the Early Modern Northeast: A Reappraisal". William and Mary Quarterly. Third Series. 61 (1): 77–106. doi:10.2307/3491676. JSTOR 3491676. coauthored with Emerson W. Baker, Recipient of Harryman Dorsey Award (Society of Colonial Wars in the District of Columbia).
- The New England Knight: Sir William Phips, 1651–1695. Toronto: University of Toronto Press, 1998. Co-authored with Emerson W. Baker. Recipient of Keith Matthews Prize (Canadian Nautical Research Society).
- The Atlantic Region to Confederation: A History. Toronto and Fredericton: University of Toronto Press and Acadiensis Press, 1994. Co-edited with Phillip A. Buckner. Recipient of Regional History Certificate of Merit (Canadian Historical Association).
