= Nino Ricci =

Canadian novelist

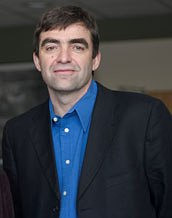
- Born: Nino Pio Ricci; 1959 (age 66–67); Leamington, Ontario, Canada
- Education: York University (BA); Concordia University (MA)
- Occupation: Novelist
- Writing career
- Notable works: Lives of the Saints (1990); Testament (2002); The Origin of Species (2008)
- Notable awards: Governor General's Award for English-language fiction (1990, 2008); Books in Canada First Novel Award (1990); Trillium Book Award (2002); Member of the Order of Canada (2011)
- Website: www.ninoricci.com

Nino Pio Ricci (born 1959) is a Canadian novelist who lives in Toronto, Ontario. He was born in Leamington, Ontario to Italian immigrants, Virginio and Amelia Ricci, from the province of Isernia, Molise.

Ricci received a B.A. in English literature from York University, Toronto in 1981 and a Master's in Creative Writing from Concordia University, Montreal in 1987. Ricci has travelled in Europe and Africa, where, in Nigeria, he taught English literature and language in a high school for two years.

Ricci's first novel Lives of the Saints was a critical and commercial success. It won the Books in Canada First Novel Award, the 1990 Governor General's Award for Fiction and a Betty Trask Award. It forms a trilogy with Ricci's next two novels, In a Glass House (1993) and Where She Has Gone (1997).

Ricci served as one of the directors of PEN Canada from 1990 to 1996, and as president during 1995–96. He was the writer-in-residence at the University of Windsor for the 2005–06 academic year.

== Awards and nominations ==
- 1990 Governor General's Award for Fiction for Lives of the Saints
- 1990 Books in Canada First Novel Award for Lives of the Saints
- 1997 Giller Prize (shortlist for Where She Has Gone)
- 2002 Trillium Book Award (co-winner for Testament)
- 2006 Alistair MacLeod Award for Literary Achievement
- 2008 Giller Prize (longlist for The Origin of Species)
- 2008 Governor General's Award for Fiction for The Origin of Species
- 2011 Member of the Order of Canada

== Works ==
=== Novels ===
- Lives of the Saints (1990) (inspiration for a TV miniseries directed by Jerry Ciccoritti)
- In a Glass House (1993)
- Where She Has Gone (1997)
- Testament (2002)
- The Origin of Species (2008)
- Sleep (2015)

=== Non-Fiction ===
- Roots and Frontiers (essays and memoir) (2003)
- Pierre Elliott Trudeau (biography) (2009)
