= John Bartlet Brebner =

Canadian historian (1895–1957)

John Bartlet Brebner (19 May 1895 – 9 November 1957) was a Canadian-born Canadian and American historian who spent the major part of his career in the United States.

Born in Toronto and educated at the University of Toronto, St John's College, Oxford, and Columbia University, he taught at the University of Toronto between 1921 and 1925, when he moved to Columbia University where he spent the rest of his career. During the First World War, he served in the Canadian Army, before being commissioned into the British Army (Royal Garrison Artillery).

Brebner was president of the Canadian Historical Association for 1939–40, won the Royal Society of Canada's J. B. Tyrrell Historical Medal in 1950, and was Pitt Professor of American History and Institutions at the University of Cambridge in 1954–55.

Brebner is remembered for coining the expression "the Siamese twins of North America" to describe Canada-United States relations and the concept of the North Atlantic triangle.
