= Bibliography of Canadian history =

This is a bibliography of major works on the History of Canada mainly compiled in 2011 from the Canadiana : the national bibliography with arbitrary additions since then.

== Scholarly journals focused on Canadian history ==
- Acadiensis, covers Atlantic Canada
- Alberta history
- American Review of Canadian Studies
- British Columbia History
- Canada's History, Formerly The Beaver (1920–2010)
- Canadian Historical Review, the major scholarly journal
- Histoire sociale/Social History, focus on Canada
- Labour/Le Travail
- London Journal of Canadian Studies
- Manitoba History
- Ontario History
- Revue d'histoire de l'Amérique française focus on Quebec
- Saskatchewan History
- Urban History Review - Revue d'histoire urbaine

== Atlases, geography, environment ==
- Dean, William G.; Heidenreich, Conrad E.; McIlwraith, Thomas F.; Warkentin, John, eds. (1998). Concise Historical Atlas of Canada. University of Toronto Press. ISBN 978-0-8020-4203-3.
- Forkey, Neil S. (2012). Canadians and the Natural Environment to the Twenty-First Century. University of Toronto Press. ISBN 978-0-8020-9022-5.
- Gentilcore, R. Louis, ed. (1993). Historical Atlas of Canada: The Land Transformed, 1800–1891. Vol. II. University of Toronto Press. ISBN 978-0-8020-3447-2.
- Harris, R. Cole, ed. (1987). Historical atlas of Canada: From the beginning to 1800. Vol. 1. University of Toronto Press. ISBN 978-0-8020-2495-4.
- Hayes, Derek (2015). Historical Atlas of Canada: Canada's History Illustrated with Original Maps (illustrated, revised ed.). Douglas & McIntyre. ISBN 978-1-7716-2079-6.
- Hudson, John C. (2002). Across This Land: A Regional Geography of the United States and Canada. Johns Hopkins University Press. ISBN 978-0-8018-6567-1.
- Ingram, Darcy (2013). Wildlife, Conservation, and Conflict in Quebec, 1840–1914. University of British Columbia Press. ISBN 978-0-7748-2142-1.
- Kerr, Donald; Holdsworth, Deryck W., eds. (1990). Historical Atlas of Canada: Addressing the Twentieth Century, 1891–1961. Vol. III. University of Toronto Press. ISBN 978-0-8020-3448-9.
- Levere, Trevor H. (2004). Science and the Canadian Arctic: A Century of Exploration, 1818–1918. Cambridge University Press. ISBN 978-0-521-52491-9.
- Loo, Tina (2006). States of Nature: Conserving Canada's Wildlife in the Twentieth Century. University of British Columbia Press. ISBN 978-0-7748-1289-4.
- Payne, Brian (2016). "The Environmental Historiography of the Maritime Peninsula". Acadiensis. 45 (1): 163–177. doi:10.1353/aca.2016.0000.
- Piper, Liza (December 2014). "Coming in from the Cold". Canadian Historical Review. 95 (4): 567–573. doi:10.3138/chr.95.4.hp03. S2CID 162710551. Historiography
- Pyne, Stephen J. (2008). Awful Splendour: A Fire History of Canada. UBC Press. ISBN 978-0-7748-4027-9. on human uses and control of fires
- Reader's Digest; Canadian Geographic (2004). The Canadian Atlas: Our Nation, Environment and People. Douglas & McIntyre. ISBN 978-1-5536-5082-9.
- Sörlin, Sverker (December 2014). "The Historiography of the Enigmatic North". Canadian Historical Review. 95 (4): 555–566. doi:10.3138/chr.95.4.hp02. S2CID 162902741.
- Stagg, Ronald (2010). The Golden Dream: A History of the St. Lawrence Seaway. Dundurn. ISBN 978-1-55002-887-4.

== Surveys (overviews) ==
- "Home | the Canadian Encyclopedia". The Canadian Encyclopedia (online ed.). Historica Canada. Recommended place to start
- Aziz, Stephen; Gough, Barry M. (2021) [2000, 2011]. Historical Dictionary of Canada. Rowman. ISBN 978-1538120330.
- Brune, Nick; Sweeny, Alastair (2005). "History of Canada Online". Waterloo: Northern Blue Publishing. Archived from the original on 2011-07-06. Web listing of Canadian history sources
- Black, Conrad (2014). Rise to Greatness: The History of Canada From the Vikings to the Present. McClelland & Stewart. ISBN 978-0-7710-1355-3.
- Beck, J. Murray (1968). Pendulum of Power; Canada's Federal Elections. Prentice-Hall of Canada.
- Bothwell, Robert (2007). The Penguin History of Canada. Toronto: Penguin Canada. ISBN 978-0-1430-5032-2.
- Bumsted, J.M. (2014). The Peoples of Canada: A Pre-Confederation History (fourth ed.). Toronto: Oxford University Press. ISBN 978-0-1954-4636-4.
- Bumsted, J.M. (2013). The Peoples of Canada: A Post-Confederation History (fourth ed.). Toronto: Oxford University Press. ISBN 978-0-1954-4631-9.
- Conrad, Margaret; Finkel, Alvin (2007). Foundations: Readings in Post-Confederation Canadian History. Vol. 1 (2nd ed.). Toronto: Pearson Longman. ISBN 978-0-3214-9110-7.
- Conrad, Margaret; Finkel, Alvin (2007). Nation and Society: Readings in Post-Confederation Canadian History. Vol. 2 (2nd ed.). Toronto: Pearson Longman. ISBN 978-0-3214-9416-0.
- Conrad, Margaret; Finkel, Alvin (2012). Canada: A National History (3rd ed.). Toronto: Pearson Education Canada. ISBN 978-0-1329-1787-2.
- Friesen, Gerald (1987). The Canadian Prairies : a History (2nd ed.). University of Toronto Press. ISBN 978-0-8020-6648-0.
- Gillmor, Don; Turgeon, Pierre (2002). Canada: A People's History. Vol. 1. McClelland & Stewart. ISBN 978-0-7710-3324-7.
- Gillmor, Don (2002). Canada: A People's History. Vol. 2. McClelland & Stewart. ISBN 978-0-7710-3336-0.
- Granatstein, J.L. (1997). Yankee Go Home?: Canadians and Anti-Americanism. HarperCollins Canada. ISBN 978-0-0063-8541-7.
- Hallowell, Gerald, ed. (2004). The Oxford Companion to Canadian History. Oxford University Press. ISBN 978-0-1954-1559-9. 1650 short entries
- Marquis, Thomas Guthrie, ed. (1903). Giants of the Dominion: from Cartier to Laurier. W. E. Scull.
- Morton, Desmond (2001). A Short History of Canada (5th ed.). McClelland & Stewart. ISBN 978-0-7710-6509-5.
- Morton, Desmond (1999). A Military History of Canada. McClelland & Stewart. ISBN 978-0-7710-6514-9.
- Moogk, Peter (2000). La Nouvelle France: The Making of French Canada a Cultural History. Michigan State University Press. ISBN 978-0-8701-3528-6.
- Owram, Doug, ed. (1994). Canadian History: A Reader's Guide Volume 2: Confederation to the present. University of Toronto Press. ISBN 978-0-8020-2801-3.
- Pound, Richard W. (2006). Fitzhenry & Whiteside Book of Canadian Facts and Dates (3rd ed.). Fitzhenry & Whiteside. ISBN 978-1-5545-5009-8.
- Prentice, Alison; et al. (1996). Canadian Women: a History (2nd ed.). Harcourt Brace. ISBN 978-0-7747-3293-2.
- Pryke, Kenneth G.; Soderlund, Walter C., eds. (2003). Profiles of Canada (3rd ed.). Toronto: Canadian Scholars' Press. ISBN 978-1-5513-0226-3.
- Rawlyk, George A., ed. (1994). The Canadian Protestant Experience, 1760 to 1990. McGill-Queen's University Press. ISBN 978-0-7735-1132-3.
- Riendeaum, Roger E. (2007). A brief history of Canada (2nd ed.). Toronto: Infobase. ISBN 978-0-8160-6335-2.
- Taylor, M. Brook, ed. (1994). Canadian History: A Reader's Guide Volume 1: Beginnings to Confederation. University of Toronto Press. ISBN 978-0-8020-5016-8.

=== Chronicles of Canada series ===
- Leacock, Stephen (1915). Wrong, George M.; Langton, H. H. (eds.). The Dawn of Canadian History: A Chronicle of Aboriginal Canada. Chronicles of Canada. Vol. 1. Toronto: Glasgow, Brook & Company.
- Leacock, Stephen (1915). Wrong, George M.; Langton, H. H. (eds.). The Mariner of St. Malo: A Chronicle of the Voyages of Jacques Cartier. Chronicles of Canada. Vol. 2. Toronto: Glasgow, Brook & Company.
- Colby, Charles W. (1915). Wrong, George M.; Langton, H. H. (eds.). The Founder of New France: A Chronicle of Champlain. Chronicles of Canada. Vol. 3. Toronto: Glasgow, Brook & Company.
- Marquis, Thomas Guthrie (1915). Wrong, George M.; Langton, H. H. (eds.). The Jesuit Missions: A Chronicle of the Cross in the Wilderness. Chronicles of Canada. Vol. 4. Toronto: Glasgow, Brook & Company.
- Munro, William Bennett (1915). Wrong, George M.; Langton, H. H. (eds.). The Seigneurs of Old Canada: A Chronicle of New-World Feudalism. Chronicles of Canada. Vol. 5. Toronto: Glasgow, Brook & Company.
- Chapais, Thomas (1914). Wrong, George M.; Langton, H. H. (eds.). The Great Intendant: A Chronicle of Jean Talon in Canada 1665–1672. Chronicles of Canada. Vol. 6. Toronto: Glasgow, Brook & Company.
- Colby, Charles W. (1914). Wrong, George M.; Langton, H. H. (eds.). The Fighting Governor: A Chronicle of Frontenac. Chronicles of Canada. Vol. 7. Toronto: Glasgow, Brook & Company.
- Wood, William (1915). Wrong, George M.; Langton, H. H. (eds.). The Great Fortress: A Chronicle of Louisbourg 1720–1760. Chronicles of Canada. Vol. 8. Toronto: Glasgow, Brook & Company.
- Doughty, Arthur G. (1916). Wrong, George M.; Langton, H. H. (eds.). The Acadian Exiles: A Chronicle of the Land of Evangeline. Chronicles of Canada. Vol. 9. Toronto: Glasgow, Brook & Company. also at Archive.org
- Wood, William (1915). Wrong, George M.; Langton, H. H. (eds.). The Passing of New France: A Chronicle of Montcalm. Chronicles of Canada. Vol. 10. Toronto: Glasgow, Brook & Company.
- Wood, William (1915). Wrong, George M.; Langton, H. H. (eds.). The Winning of Canada: A Chronicle of Wolf. Chronicles of Canada. Vol. 11. Toronto: Glasgow, Brook & Company.
- Wood, William (1916). Wrong, George M.; Langton, H. H. (eds.). The Father of British Canada: A Chronicle of Carleton. Chronicles of Canada. Vol. 12. Toronto: Glasgow, Brook & Company.
- Wallace, W. Stewart (1914). Wrong, George M.; Langton, H. H. (eds.). The United Empire Loyalists: A Chronicle of the Great Migration. Chronicles of Canada. Vol. 13. Toronto: Glasgow, Brook & Company.
- Wood, William (1915). Wrong, George M.; Langton, H. H. (eds.). The War With the United States: A Chronicle of 1812. Chronicles of Canada. Vol. 14. Toronto: Glasgow, Brook & Company.
- Marquis, Thomas Guthrie (1915). Wrong, George M.; Langton, H. H. (eds.). The War Chief of the Ottawas: A Chronicle of the Pontiac War. Chronicles of Canada. Vol. 15. Toronto: Glasgow, Brook & Company.
- Wood, Louis Aubrey (1915). Wrong, George M.; Langton, H. H. (eds.). The War Chief of the Six Nations: A Chronicle of Joseph Brant. Chronicles of Canada. Vol. 16. Toronto: Glasgow, Brook & Company.
- Raymond, Ethel T. (1915). Wrong, George M.; Langton, H. H. (eds.). Tecumseh: A Chronicle of the Last Great Leader of His People. Chronicles of Canada. Vol. 17. Toronto: Glasgow, Brook & Company.
- Laut, Agnes C. (1914). Wrong, George M.; Langton, H. H. (eds.). The "Adventurers of England" on Hudson Bay: A Chronicle of the Fur Trade in the North. Chronicles of Canada. Vol. 18. Toronto: Glasgow, Brook & Company.
- Burpee, Lawrence J. (1914). Wrong, George M.; Langton, H. H. (eds.). Pathfinders of the Great Plains: A Chronicle of La Vérendrye and his Sons. Chronicles of Canada. Vol. 19. Toronto: Glasgow, Brook & Company.
- Leacock, Stephen (1914). Wrong, George M.; Langton, H. H. (eds.). Adventurers of the Far North: A Chronicle of the Frozen Seas. Chronicles of Canada. Vol. 20. Toronto: Glasgow, Brook & Company.
- Wood, Louis Aubrey (1915). Wrong, George M.; Langton, H. H. (eds.). The Red River Colony: A Chronicle of the Beginnings of Manitoba. Chronicles of Canada. Vol. 21. Toronto: Glasgow, Brook & Company.
- Laut, Agnes C. (1915). Wrong, George M.; Langton, H. H. (eds.). Pioneers of the Pacific Coast: A Chronicle of Sea Rovers and Fur Hunters. Chronicles of Canada. Vol. 22. Toronto: Glasgow, Brook & Company.
- Laut, Agnes C. (1916). Wrong, George M.; Langton, H. H. (eds.). The Cariboo Trail: A Chronicle of the Gold-fields of British Columbia. Chronicles of Canada. Vol. 23. Toronto: Glasgow, Brook & Company.
- Wallace, W. Stewart (1920). Wrong, George M.; Langton, H. H. (eds.). The Family Compact : a Chronicle of the Rebellion in Upper Canada. Chronicles of Canada. Vol. 24. Toronto: Glasgow, Brook & Company.
- Decelles, Alfred D. (1916). Wrong, George M.; Langton, H. H. (eds.). The 'Patriotes' of '37: A Chronicle of the Lower Canada Rebellion. Chronicles of Canada. Vol. 25. Toronto: Glasgow, Brook & Company.
- Grant, William Lawson (1915). Wrong, George M.; Langton, H. H. (eds.). The Tribune of Nova Scotia: A Chronicle of Joseph Howe. Chronicles of Canada. Vol. 26. Toronto: Glasgow, Brook & Company.
- Grant, William Lawson (1916). Wrong, George M.; Langton, H. H. (eds.). The Winning of Popular Government: A Chronicle of the Union of 1841. Chronicles of Canada. Vol. 27. Toronto: Glasgow, Brook & Company.
- Colquhoun, A.H.U. (1916). Wrong, George M.; Langton, H. H. (eds.). The Fathers of Confederation: A Chronicle of the Birth of the Dominion. Chronicles of Canada. Vol. 28. Toronto: Glasgow, Brook & Company.
- Pope, Joseph (1915). Wrong, George M.; Langton, H. H. (eds.). The Day of Sir John Macdonald: A Chronicle of the First Prime Minister of the Dominion. Chronicles of Canada. Vol. 29. Toronto: Glasgow, Brook & Company.
- Skelton, Oscar D. (1916). Wrong, George M.; Langton, H. H. (eds.). The Day of Sir Wilfrid Laurier: A Chronicle of Our Own Time. Chronicles of Canada. Vol. 30. Toronto: Glasgow, Brook & Company.
- Wood, William (1915). Wrong, George M.; Langton, H. H. (eds.). All Afloat: A Chronicle of Craft and Waterways. Chronicles of Canada. Vol. 31. Toronto: Glasgow, Brook & Company.
- Skelton, Oscar D. (1916). Wrong, George M.; Langton, H. H. (eds.). The Railway Builders: A Chronicle of Overland Highways. Chronicles of Canada. Vol. 32. Toronto: Glasgow, Brook & Company.

Republished

- Wrong, George M.; Langton, H.H., eds. (2009). The Chronicles of Canada: Volume I - the First Europeans. Fireship Press. ISBN 978-1-934757-44-4.
- Wrong, George M.; Langton, H.H., eds. (2009). The Chronicles of Canada: Volume II - The Rise of New France. Fireship Press. ISBN 978-1-934757-45-1.
- Wrong, George M.; Langton, H.H., eds. (2009). The Chronicles of Canada: Volume III - the English Invasion. Fireship Press. ISBN 978-1-934757-46-8.
- Wrong, George M.; Langton, H.H., eds. (2009). The Chronicles of Canada: Volume IV - The Beginnings of British Canada. Fireship Press. ISBN 978-1-934757-47-5.
- Wrong, George M.; Langton, H.H., eds. (2009). The Chronicles of Canada: Volume V - The Native Peoples of Canada. Fireship Press. ISBN 978-1-934757-48-2.
- Wrong, George M.; Langton, H.H., eds. (2009). The Chronicles of Canada: Volume VI - Pioneers of the North and West. Fireship Press. ISBN 978-1-934757-49-9.
- Wrong, George M.; Langton, H.H., eds. (2009). The Chronicles of Canada: Volume VII - The Struggle for Political Freedom. Fireship Press. ISBN 978-1-934757-50-5.
- Wrong, George M.; Langton, H.H., eds. (2009). The Chronicles of Canada: Volume VIII - The Growth of Nationality. Fireship Press. ISBN 978-1-934757-51-2.
- Wrong, George M.; Langton, H.H., eds. (2009). The Chronicles of Canada: Volume IX - Our First National Highways. Fireship Press. ISBN 978-1-934757-52-9.

== Provinces and territories ==
=== Cities ===
- Artibise, Alan (1977). Winnipeg: An Illustrated History. Toronto: James Lorimer and Company. ISBN 9780888621504.
- Brennan, J. William (1989). Regina: An Illustrated History. Toronto: James Lorimer and Company. ISBN 9781550282504.
- Errington, Jane (1988). Greater Kingston: Historic Past, Progressive Future. Burlington: Windsor Publications Ltd. ISBN 9780897812580.
- Fraser, W.B. (1967). Calgary. Toronto: Holt, Rinehart and Winston.
- Glazebrook, George Parkin de Twenebroker (1971). The Story of Toronto. Toronto: University of Toronto Press. ISBN 9780802017918.
- Gregson, Harry (1977). A History of Victoria, 1842 - 1970. North Vancouver: J.J Douglas Ltd.
- Jenkins, Kathleen (1966). Montreal: Island City of the St. Lawrence. Doubleday.
- Levine, Allan (2014). Toronto: A Biography. Douglas and McIntyre. ISBN 978-1-77100-022-2.
- Linteau, Paul-André; McCambridge, Peter (2013). The History of Montréal: The Story of a Great North American City. Baraka Books. ISBN 978-1-926824-77-2.
- MacGregor, J.G. (1967). Edmonton: A History. Edmonton: Hurtig Publishers.
- Mauro, Joseph (1990). Thunder Bay: A City's Story. Thunder Bay: Joseph Mauro. ISBN 9780969614807.
- Morrison, Neil F. (1954). Garden Gateway to Canada: One Hundred Years of Windsor and Essex County 1854 - 1954. Toronto: Ryerson Press.
- Nader, George (1975). Cities of Canada: Theoretical, Historical and Planning Perspectives. Toronto: Macmillan of Canada. ISBN 9780770510299.
- Nader, George (1976). Cities of Canada. Vol. II: Profiles of Fifteen Metropolitan Centres. Toronto: Macmillan of Canada. ISBN 9780770512392.
- Nicol, Eric (1978). Vancouver. Toronto: Doubleday Canada Ltd.
- Raddall, Thomas H. (1993). Halifax: Warden of the North. Toronto: Nimbus. ISBN 9781551090603.
- Roberts, Leslie (1969). Montreal: From Mission Colony to World City. Toronto: Macmillan of Canada.
- Woods, Shirley E. (1980). Ottawa: The Capital of Canada. Toronto: Doubleday Canada Ltd. ISBN 9780385147224.

== Indigenous ==
- Axtell, James (1981). The Indian Peoples of Eastern America: A Documentary History of the Sexes. Oxford University Press. ISBN 978-0-19-502741-9.
- Axtell, James (1981). The European and the Indian: essays in the ethnohistory of colonial North America. Oxford University Press. ISBN 978-0-19-502903-1. online
- Baugh, Timothy G.; Ericson, Jonathon E. (1994). Prehistoric Exchange Systems in North America. Springer US. ISBN 978-0-306-44756-3.
- Barman, Jean; Hébert, Yvonne M.; McCaskill, Don N. (1986). Indian Education in Canada: The challenge. UBC Press. ISBN 978-0-7748-0265-9.X
- Beardy, Flora; Coutts, Robert (1996). Voices from Hudson Bay: Cree Stories from York Factory. McGill-Queen's Press. ISBN 978-0-7735-1441-6.
- Bell, C. Elizabeth (2015). "A Historiography of Canadian Aboriginal Activism in the 20th Century". Waterloo Historical Review. 7. doi:10.15353/whr.v7.27.
- Brownlie, Robin (2003). A Fatherly Eye: Indian Agents, Government Power, and Aboriginal Resistance in Ontario, 1918–1939. University of Toronto Press. ISBN 978-0-19-541784-5.
- Clark, Ella Elizabeth (1960). Indian Legends of Canada. McClelland and Stewart. ISBN 978-0-7710-2122-0.
- Comeau, Pauline; Santin, Aldo (1995). The First Canadians: A Profile of Canada's Native People Today. James Lorimer & Company. ISBN 978-1-55028-478-2.
- Crowe, Keith J. (1991). A History of the Original Peoples of Northern Canada. McGill-Queen's Press. ISBN 978-0-7735-0880-4.
- Daschuk, James W. (2013). Clearing the Plains: Disease, Politics of Starvation, and the Loss of Aboriginal Life. Regina, Saskatchewan, Canada: University of Regina Press. ISBN 978-088977-296-0.
- Dickason, Olive Patricia; McNab, David T. (2009). Canada's First Nations: A History of Founding Peoples from Earliest Times (4th ed.). Toronto, Ontario, Canada: Oxford University Press. ISBN 978-0-19-542892-6.
- Dupuis, Renée (2002). Justice for Canada's Aboriginal peoples. James Lorimer and Company. ISBN 978-1-55028-775-2.
- Edwards, Brendan Frederick R. (2005). Paper Talk: A History of Libraries, Print Culture, and Aboriginal Peoples in Canada Before 1960. Scarecrow Press. ISBN 978-0-8108-5113-9.
- Elias, Peter Douglas (1991). Development of aboriginal people's communities. Captus Press. ISBN 978-0-921801-51-1.
- Flanagan, Thomas (2000). First Nations? Second Thoughts. McGill-Queen's Press. ISBN 978-0-7735-2070-7.
- Gibson, Gordon (2009). A New Look at Canadian Indian Policy: Respect the Collective, Promote the Individual. The Fraser Institute. ISBN 978-0-88975-243-6.
- Greer, Allan (2004). Mohawk Saint: Catherine Tekakwitha and the Jesuits. Oxford University Press. ISBN 978-0-19-803899-3.
- Haig-Brown, Celia (1988). Resistance and Renewal: Surviving the Indian Residential School. Arsenal Pulp Press. ISBN 978-0-88978-189-4.
- Haig-Brown, Celia; Nock, David A., eds. (2006). With Good Intentions: Euro-Canadian and Aboriginal Relations in Colonial Canada. UBC Press. ISBN 978-0-7748-1138-5.
- Ives, John W. (1990). A theory of Northern Athapaskan prehistory. Westview Press. ISBN 978-0-8133-7517-5.
- Jaenen, Cornelius J. (1976). Friend and Foe: Aspects of French-Amerindian Cultural Contact in the Sixteenth and Seventeenth Centuries. McClelland and Stewart. ISBN 978-0-7710-4394-9.
- Knopf, Kerstin (2008). Aboriginal Canada Revisited. University of Ottawa Press. ISBN 978-0-7766-0679-8.
- Ladner, Kiera L.; Tait, Myra, eds. (2017). Surviving Canada: Indigenous peoples celebrate 150 years of betrayal. Winnipeg, Manitoba: Arp Books. ISBN 978-1-894037-89-1.
- Leacock, Stephen (2014). The Dawn of Canadian History: A Chronicle of Aboriginal Canada: The First European Visitors. Floating Press. ISBN 978-1-77652-909-4.
- Lutz, John Sutton (2009). Makúk: A New History of Aboriginal-White Relations. UBC Press. ISBN 978-0-7748-5827-4.
- Magocsi, Paul R. (2002). Aboriginal Peoples of Canada: A Short Introduction. University of Toronto Press. ISBN 978-0-8020-8469-9.
- McMillan, Alan D. (1995). Native Peoples and Cultures of Canada. Vancouver, British Columbia: Douglas and MacIntyre Ltd. ISBN 978-1-55054-150-2.
- Miller, J. R. (2000). Skyscrapers hide the heavens : a history of Indian-white relations in Canada (3rd ed.). University of Toronto Press. ISBN 978-0802081537.
- Milloy, John S. (1999). A National Crime: The Canadian Government and the Residential School System, 1879 to 1986. University of Manitoba Press. ISBN 978-0-88755-303-5.
- Paul, Daniel N. (2006). First Nations history: we were not the savages. Black Point, Nova Scotia: Fernwood Publishing. ISBN 978-1-55266-209-0.
- Peterson, Jacqueline; Brown, Jennifer S. H. (2001). The New Peoples: Being and Becoming Métis in North America. Minnesota Historical Society Press. ISBN 978-0-87351-408-8.
- Pettipas, Katherine (1994). Serving the Ties That Bind: Government Repression of Indigenous Religious Ceremonies on the Prairies (PDF). Manitoba Studies in Native American History. Winnipeg: University of Manitoba Press. ISBN 0-88755-638-8.
- Ray, Arthur J. (2016). An Illustrated History of Canada's Native People (4th ed.). McGill-Queen's University Press. ISBN 978-0-7735-4800-8.
- Rogers, Edward S.; Smith, Donald B. (1994). Aboriginal Ontario: Historical Perspectives on the First Nations. Dundurn Press. ISBN 978-1-55002-230-8.
- Schmalz, Peter S. (1991). The Ojibwa of Southern Ontario. University of Toronto Press. ISBN 978-0-8020-6778-4.
- Taylor, John Leonard (1985). Treaty Research Report: Treaty Four (1874) (PDF) (Report). Ottawa: Indian and Northern Affairs Canada. Archived from the original (PDF) on 2016-08-06.
- Tester, Frank; Kulchyski, Peter (2011). Tammarniit (Mistakes): Inuit Relocation in the Eastern Arctic, 1939-63. UBC Press. ISBN 978-0-7748-4271-6.
- Trigger, Bruce G. (1987). The Children of Aataentsic: A History of the Huron People to 1660. McGill–Queen's University Press. ISBN 978-0-7735-0627-5.
- Trigger, Bruce (1986). Natives and Newcomers: Canada's "Heroic Age" Reconsidered. McGill-Queen's Press. ISBN 978-0-7735-0595-7.
- Wallis, Wilson D. (1955). The Micmac Indians of Eastern Canada. U of Minnesota Press. ISBN 978-0-8166-6014-8.
- White, Phillip M. (2004). Bibliography of Native American Bibliographies. Greenwood Publishing Group. ISBN 978-0-313-31941-9.

== Prior to 1763 ==
- "Home Page". Dictionary of Canadian Biography (online ed.). University of Toronto Press. 1979–2016. thousands of scholarly biographies of those who died by 1930
- Bannister, Jerry. "Atlantic Canada in an Atlantic World? Northeastern North America in the Long 18th Century." Acadiensis 43.2 (2014) online.
- Brecher, Frank W. (1998). Losing a Continent: France's North American Policy, 1753–1763. Greenwood Publishing Group. ISBN 978-0-313-30786-7.
- Chartrand, René (2013). The Forts of New France in Northeast America 1600–1763. Bloomsbury Publishing. ISBN 978-1-84908-074-3.
- Chartrand, René (2010-04-20). The Forts of New France: the Great Lakes, the Plains and the Gulf Coast, 1600–1763. Osprey Publishing. ISBN 978-1-84603-504-3.
- Coates, Colin M. (2000). The Metamorphoses of Landscape and Community in Early Quebec. McGill-Queen's Press. ISBN 978-0-7735-1897-1.
- Conrad, Margaret; Finkel, Alvin; Fyson, Donald (28 March 2014). History of the Canadian Peoples: Beginnings to 1867. Pearson Education. ISBN 978-0-13-359526-0. University textbook
- Crowley, Terry A. (24 April 2015). Canadian History: Pre-Colonization to 1867 Essentials. Research & Education Assoc. ISBN 978-0-7386-7205-2.
- Dale, Ronald J. (1 May 2004). The Fall of New France: How the French Lost a North American Empire 1754–1763. James Lorimer & Company. ISBN 978-1-55028-840-7.
- Dechêne, Louise (1992). Habitants and Merchants in Seventeenth-Century Montreal. McGill-Queen's Press. ISBN 978-0-7735-0951-1.
- Eccles, William John (1983). The Canadian Frontier, 1534–1760. UNM Press. ISBN 978-0-8263-0706-4.
- Eccles, William John (1987). Essays on New France. Oxford University Press. ISBN 978-0-19-540580-4.
- Gagnon, Serge (1982). Quebec and Its Historians, 1840–1920. Harvest House. ISBN 978-0887722134.
- Greer, Allan (1997). The People of New France. University of Toronto Press. ISBN 978-0-8020-7816-2.
- Greer, Allan (2000). The Jesuit Relations: Natives and Missionaries in Seventeenth-century North America. Bedford/St. Martin's. ISBN 978-0-312-22744-9.
- Hughes, Thomas (1 May 2009). History of the Society of Jesus in North America. Applewood Books. ISBN 978-1-4290-1833-3.
- Havard, Gilles; Vidal, Cécile (July 2007). "Making New France New Again: French historians rediscover their American past". Common-place, the Interactive Journal of Early American Life. 7 (4).
- Innis, Harold Adams (1999). The Fur Trade in Canada: An Introduction to Canadian Economic History. University of Toronto Press. ISBN 978-0-8020-8196-4.
- Lanctôt, Gustave (1963). A History of Canada: From its origins to the royal régime, 1663. Clarke, Irwin.
- Lanctôt, Gustave (1964). A History of Canada: From the Royal Regime to the Treaty of Utrecht, 1663–1713. Harvard University Press.
- Lanctôt, Gustave (1965). A History of Canada: From the Treaty of Utrecht to the Treaty of Paris, 1713–1763. Clarke, Irwin & Company. ISBN 978-0-7720-0007-1.
- Marshall, Bill, ed. France and the Americas: Culture, Politics, and History (3 Vol 2005)
- Moogk, Peter N. (January 2000). La Nouvelle France: The Making of French Canada : a Cultural History. Michigan State University Press. ISBN 978-0-87013-528-6.
- Plank, Geoffrey (29 September 2003). An Unsettled Conquest: The British Campaign Against the Peoples of Acadia. University of Pennsylvania Press. ISBN 978-0-8122-1869-5.
- Pope, Peter Edward (1 December 2012). Fish Into Wine: The Newfoundland Plantation in the Seventeenth Century. UNC Press Books. ISBN 978-0-8078-3917-1.
- Trudel, Marcel (1973). The beginnings of New France, 1524–1663. McClelland and Stewart. ISBN 9780771086106.
- Kirk, Sylvia Van (1983). Many Tender Ties: Women in Fur-trade Society, 1670–1870. University of Oklahoma Press. ISBN 978-0-8061-1847-5.
- Wrong, George M. The Conquest of New France: A Chronicle of the Colonial Wars. Hayes Barton Press. ISBN 978-1-59377-523-0.

== 1763–1867 ==
- "Home Page". Dictionary of Canadian Biography (online ed.). University of Toronto Press. 1979–2016., thousands of scholarly biographies of those who died by 1930
- Beck, J. Murray (1984). Joseph Howe: Conservative Reformer, 1804–1848. McGill-Queen's Press. ISBN 978-0-7735-0445-5.
- Beck, J. Murray (1984). Joseph Howe: The Briton becomes Canadian, 1848–1873. McGill-Queen's Press. ISBN 978-0-7735-0447-9.
- Careless, J.M.S. (1996). Brown of the Globe: Volume One: Voice of Upper Canada 1818–1859. Dundurn. ISBN 978-1-55002-050-2.
- Careless, J.M.S. (1996). Brown of the Globe: Volume Two: Statesman of Confederation 1860–1880. Dundurn. ISBN 978-1-55488-111-6.
- Careless, James Maurice Stockford (1967). The union of the Canadas; the growth of Canadian Institutions, 1841–1857. McClelland and Stewart. ISBN 9780771019128.
- Creighton, Donald (1998). John A. Macdonald. University of Toronto Press. ISBN 978-0-8020-7164-4. influential scholarly biography
- Craven, Paul; Ontario (1995). Labouring lives: work and workers in nineteenth-century Ontario. University of Toronto Press. ISBN 978-0-8020-0641-7.
- Greer, Allan (1993). The Patriots and the People: The Rebellion of 1837 in Rural Lower Canada. University of Toronto Press. ISBN 978-0-8020-6930-6.
- Heidler, David Stephen; Heidler, Jeanne T. (January 2004). Encyclopedia of the War of 1812. Naval Institute Press. ISBN 978-1-59114-362-8.
- Martin, Ged (1995). Britain and the Origins of Canadian Confederation, 1837-67. UBC Press. ISBN 978-0-7748-0487-5.
- Martin, Ged (1990). The Causes of Canadian Confederation. Acadiensis Press. ISBN 978-0-919107-25-0.
- Marquis, Greg (2000). In Armageddon's Shadow: The Civil War and Canada's Maritime Provinces. McGill-Queen's Press. ISBN 978-0-7735-2079-0.
- Morton, William Lewis (1968). The Critical Years: The Union of British North America, 1857–1873. McClelland and Stewart Limited. ISBN 9780771065613.
- Sweeny, Alastair (1976). George-Etienne Cartier: A Biography. McClelland and Stewart. ISBN 978-0-7710-8363-1.
- Sweeny, Alastair (13 January 2016). "Welcome to the George-Etienne Cartier Portal". Canada Channel. Northern Blue Publishing. Archived from the original on 24 March 2012.
- Wade, Mason (1955). The French Canadians: 1760–1945. Macmillan Company of Canada.
- Wade, Mason (1968). The French Canadians; 1760–1967: 1760–1911. Macmillan of Canada.
- Wrong, George M. (January 1986). Canada and the American Revolution: The Disruption of the First British Empire. Rowman & Littlefield. ISBN 978-0-8154-0261-9.
- Winks, Robin W. (1998). The Civil War Years: Canada and the United States. McGill-Queen's Press. ISBN 978-0-7735-1820-9.
- Young, Brian J. (1981). George-Etienne Cartier: Montreal Bourgeois. McGill-Queen's Press. ISBN 978-0-7735-0371-7.

=== Primary sources ===
- Browne, G.P.; Ajzenstat, Janet (2009). Documents on the Confederation of British North America. McGill-Queen's Press. ISBN 978-0-7735-7609-4.
- Kennedy, William Paul McClure (1918). Documents of the Canadian Constitution, 1759–1915. Oxford University Press.
- Greenwood, Frank Murray; Wright, Barry; Osgoode Society for Canadian Legal History (2002). Canadian State Trials: Rebellion and invasion in the Canadas, 1837–1839. University of Toronto Press. ISBN 978-0-8020-3748-0.

== 1867–1920 ==
- "Home Page". Dictionary of Canadian Biography (online ed.). University of Toronto Press. 1979–2016.
- Bothwell, Robert; Drummond, Ian; English, John (1990). Canada 1900–1945. University of Toronto Press. ISBN 978-0-8020-6801-9.
- Brown, Robert Craig (1975). Robert Laird Borden. A Biography. Macmillan of Canada.
- Brown, Robert Craig (1980). Robert Laird Borden: 1914–1937. Macmillan of Canada. ISBN 978-0-7705-1854-7.
- Brown, Robert Craig; Cook, Ramsay (27 September 2016). Canada 1896–1921: A Nation Transformed. McClelland & Stewart. ISBN 978-0-7710-0348-6. the standard survey
- Craats, Rennay (2000). The 1910s. Weigl Educational Publishers Limited. ISBN 978-1-896990-68-2.
- Creighton, Donald (1998). John A. Macdonald. University of Toronto Press. ISBN 978-0-8020-7164-4. Influential scholarly biography
- Dafoe, J. W. (January 2008). Laurier: A Study in Canadian Politics. Echo Library. ISBN 978-1-4068-2632-6.
- Daschuk, James (2013). Clearing the Plains: Disease, Politics of Starvation, and the Loss of Aboriginal Life. University of Regina Press. ISBN 9780889776227.
- English, John (1977). The Decline of Politics: The Conservatives and the Party System, 1901–20. University of Toronto Press. ISBN 978-0-8020-5386-2.
- Friesen, Gerald (1987). The Canadian Prairies: A History. University of Toronto Press. ISBN 978-0-8020-6648-0.
- Gwyn, Richard J. (2012). Nation Maker: Sir John A. MacDonald - His Life, Our Times. Random House of Canada. ISBN 978-0-307-35645-1.
- Hou, Charles; Hou, Cynthia, eds. (1997). Great Canadian Political Cartoons, 1820–1914. Moody's Lookout Press. ISBN 978-0-9680-0161-5.
- Milloy, John S. (1999). A National Crime: The Canadian Government and the Residential School System, 1879 to 1986. Univ. of Manitoba Press. ISBN 978-0-88755-303-5.
- Neatby, H. Blair (1973). Laurier and a Liberal Quebec: a study in political management. McClelland and Stewart. ISBN 9780771097638. -
- Roberts, Barbara Ann (January 1988). Whence They Came: Deportation from Canada, 1900–1935. University of Ottawa Press. ISBN 978-0-7766-0163-2.
- Roy, Patricia E. (1990). A White Man's Province: British Columbia Politicians and Chinese and Japanese Immigrants, 1858–1914. UBC Press. ISBN 978-0-7748-0373-1.
- Skelton, Oscar Douglas (1921). Life and Letters of Sir Wilfrid Laurier. Oxford University Press.
- Salomons, Elizabeth (1999). The 1900s. Weigl Educational Publishers Limited. ISBN 978-1-896990-70-5.
- Stanley, George F. G. (1992). The Birth of Western Canada: A History of the Riel Rebellions. University of Toronto Press. ISBN 978-0-8020-6931-3.
- Waite, Peter B. (1978). Canada 1874–1896: arduous destiny. McClelland and Stewart. ISBN 978-0-7710-8785-1. standard history

=== First World War homefront ===
- Armstrong, Elizabeth (1974). The Crisis of Quebec, 1914–1918. McGill-Queen's Press. ISBN 978-0-7710-9774-4.
- Bartholomew, Robert (1998). "Phantom German Air Raids on Canada: War Hysteria in Quebec and Ontario during the First World War". Canadian Military History. 7 (4): 29–36.
- Bliss, Michael (16 October 1981). "War business as usual: Canadian munitions production, 1914–18". In Dreisziger, N.F. (ed.). Mobilization for Total War: The Canadian, American and British Experience 1914–1918, 1939–1945. Wilfrid Laurier Univ. Press. pp. 43–56. ISBN 978-0-88920-109-5.
- Boudreau, Joseph A. (Winter 1964). "Western Canada's 'Enemy Aliens' in World War One". Alberta Historical Review. 12 (1): 1–9.
- Bray, R. Matthew (June 1980). "Fighting as an ally: The English-Canadian patriotic response to the Great War". Canadian Historical Review. 61 (2): 141–168. doi:10.3138/CHR-061-02-01. S2CID 162187535.
- Brown, Robert Craig (1971). "'Whither are we being pushed?': Political leadership in Canada during World War I". In Granatstein, J. L.; Cuff, Robert D. (eds.). War and Society in North America. T. Nelson (Canada). ISBN 978-0-17-631829-1.
- Busch, Briton Cooper, ed. (2003). Canada and the Great War: Western Front Association Papers. McGill-Queen's Press. ISBN 978-0-7735-2570-2.
- Christie, N. M. (2003). The Newfoundlanders in the Great War: The Western Front, 1916–1918 : a Social History and Battlefield Tour. CEF Books. ISBN 978-1-896979-23-6.
- Cook, Tim (25 September 2012). Warlords: Borden Mackenzie King And Canada's World Wars. Penguin Canada. ISBN 978-0-14-318667-0.
- Dempsey, James (1983). "The Indians and World War One". Alberta History. 31 (3): 1–8. ISSN 0316-1552.
- Fisher, Susan (2011). Boys and Girls in No Man's Land: English-Canadian Children and the First World War. University of Toronto Press. ISBN 978-1-4426-4224-9.
- Glassford, Sarah; Shaw, Amy J., eds. (2012). A Sisterhood of Suffering and Service: Women and Girls of Canada and Newfoundland during the First World War. UBC Press. ISBN 978-0-7748-2258-9.
- Granatstein, Jack Lawrence; Hitsman, J. MacKay (1977). Broken Promises: A History of Conscription in Canada. Oxford University Press, Incorporated. ISBN 978-0-19-540258-2.
- Heron, Craig, ed. (1998). The Workers' Revolt in Canada, 1917–1925. University of Toronto Press. ISBN 978-0-8020-8082-0.
- Humphries, Mark Osborne (2005). "The Horror at Home : The Canadian Military and the "Great" Influenza Pandemic of 1918" (PDF). Journal of the Canadian Historical Association. 16 (1): 235–260. doi:10.7202/015733ar.
- Keshen, Jeff (1996). Propaganda and Censorship During Canada's Great War. University of Alberta. ISBN 978-0-88864-279-0.
- Keith, Arthur Berriedale (1921). War Government of the British Dominions. Clarendon Press. First World War
- MacKenzie, David, ed. (2005). Canada and the First World War: Essays in Honour of Robert Craig Brown. University of Toronto Press. ISBN 978-0-8020-8445-3. 16 essays by leading scholars
- Maroney, Paul (March 1996). "'The Great Adventure': The Context and Ideology of Recruiting in Ontario, 1914–17". Canadian Historical Review. 77 (1): 62–98. doi:10.3138/CHR-077-01-03. S2CID 161472098.
- Miller, Ian Hugh Maclean (2002). Our Glory and Our Grief: Torontonians and the Great War. University of Toronto Press. ISBN 978-0-8020-3592-9.
- Millman, Brock. Polarity, Patriotism, and Dissent in Great War Canada, 1914–1919 (University of Toronto Press, 2016).
- Morton, Desmond; Wright, Glenn T. (1987). Winning the second battle: Canadian veterans and the return to civilian life, 1915–1930. University of Toronto Press. ISBN 978-0-8020-5705-1.
- Morton, Desmond; Granatstein, J. L. (1989). Marching to Armageddon: Canadians and the Great War 1914–1919. Lester & Orpen Dennys. ISBN 978-0-88619-209-9.
- Morton, Desmond (September 1980). "'Kicking and complaining': Demobilization riots in the Canadian Expeditionary Force, 1918–19". Canadian Historical Review. 61 (3): 334–360. doi:10.3138/CHR-061-03-03. S2CID 162361340.
- Morton, Desmond (1982). A peculiar kind of politics: Canada's Overseas Ministry in the First World War. University of Toronto Press. ISBN 978-0-8020-5586-6.
- Morton, Desmond (2004). Fight Or Pay: Soldiers' Families in the Great War. UBC Press. ISBN 978-0-7748-1108-8.
- Moss, Mark (2015). Manliness and Militarism: Educating Young Boys in Ontario for War. University of Toronto Press, Scholarly Publishing Division. ISBN 978-1-4426-5595-9.
- Naylor, Thomas (1981). "The Canadian state, the accumulation of capital and the Great War". Journal of Canadian Studies. 16 (3): 26–55. doi:10.3138/jcs.16.3-4.26. S2CID 157465904.
- O'Brien, Mike (January 2011). "Producers versus Profiteers: The Politics of Class in Newfoundland during the First World War". Acadiensis. 40 (1): 45–69.
- Pitsula, James M. (2008). For All We Have and are: Regina and the Experience of the Great War. University of Manitoba Press. ISBN 978-0-88755-185-7.
- Read, Daphne, ed. (1978). The Great War and Canadian society: an oral history. New Hogtown Press. ISBN 978-0-919940-02-4.
- Rutherdale, Robert Allen (2005). Hometown Horizons: Local Responses to Canada's Great War. UBC Press. ISBN 978-0-7748-1014-2. looks at farmers near Lethbridge, Alberta, shopkeepers in Guelph, Ontario, and civic workers in Trois-Rivières, Québec
- Shaw, Amy (September 2014). "Expanding the Narrative: A First World War with Women, Children, and Grief". Canadian Historical Review. 95 (3): 398–406. doi:10.3138/chr.95.3.398. S2CID 162293670.
- Shaw, Amy J. (2009). Crisis of Conscience: Conscientious Objection in Canada during the First World War. UBC Press. ISBN 978-0-7748-5854-0.
- Socknat, Thomas Paul (1987). Witness Against War: Pacifism in Canada, 1900–1945. University of Toronto Press. ISBN 978-0-8020-5704-4.
- Thompson, John Herd; Swyripa, Frances, eds. (1983). Loyalties in Conflict: Ukrainians in Canada During the Great War. Canadian Institute of Ukrainian Studies, University of Alberta. ISBN 978-0-920862-22-3.
- Tennyson, Brian Douglas (2014). Canada's Great War, 1914–1918: How Canada Helped Save the British Empire and Became a North American Nation. Scarecrow Press. ISBN 978-0-8108-8860-9.
- Theobald, Andrew (2008). The Bitter Harvest of War: New Brunswick and the Conscription Crisis of 1917. Goose Lane Editions. ISBN 978-0-86492-511-4.
- Thompson, John H. (1976). "'Permanently Wasteful but Immediately Profitable': Prairie Agriculture and the Great War" (PDF). Historical Papers. 11 (1): 193–156. doi:10.7202/030810ar.
- Thompson, John Herd (1978). The harvests of war: the Prairie West, 1914–1918. McClelland and Stewart. ISBN 978-0-7710-8560-4.
- Tough, David (September 2012). "'The rich … should give to such an extent that it will hurt': 'Conscription of Wealth' and Political Modernism in the Parliamentary Debate on the 1917 Income War Tax". Canadian Historical Review. 93 (3): 382–407. doi:10.3138/chr.640.
- Vance, Jonathan F. (2012). Maple Leaf Empire: Canada, Britain, and Two World Wars. Oxford University Press. ISBN 978-0-19-544809-2.
- Wade, Mason (1955). "Chapter 12". The French Canadians: 1760–1945. Macmillan Company of Canada.
- Walker, James W. St.G. (March 1989). "Race and Recruitment in World War I: Enlistment of Visible Minorities in the Canadian Expeditionary Force". Canadian Historical Review. 70 (1): 1–26. doi:10.3138/CHR-070-01-01.
- Winegard, Timothy Charles (2012). For King and Kanata: Canadian Indians and the First World War. Univ. of Manitoba Press. ISBN 978-0-88755-418-6.
- Wood, James A. (2010). Militia Myths: Ideas of the Canadian Citizen Soldier, 1896–1921. UBC Press. ISBN 978-0-7748-1765-3.

==== Historiography and memory ====
- Cook, Tim (Autumn 2005). "Quill and Canon: Writing the Great War in Canada". American Review of Canadian Studies. 35 (3): 503–530. doi:10.1080/02722010509481381. S2CID 144787489.; historiography
- Kovacs, Jason F.; Osborne, Brian S. (3 August 2014). "Canada & Newfoundland" ( (PDF)). A Bibliography: The Great War (1914–1918) (Report). Halifax, Nova Scotia: World Heritage Tourism Research Network, Mount Saint Vincent University. pp. 44–57. Archived from the original on 4 March 2016.; bibliography
- Vance, Jonathan F. (1997). Death So Noble: Memory, Meaning, and the First World War. UBC Press. ISBN 978-0-7748-0600-8.; cultural history

== 1921–1957 ==
=== Overviews ===
- Allen, Ralph (1961). Ordeal by Fire: Canada, 1910–1945. Doubleday Canada Limited.
- Baldwin, Douglas; Baldwin, Patricia (2000). The 1920s. Weigl Educational Publishers Limited. ISBN 978-1-896990-66-8.
- Baldwin, Douglas; Baldwin, Patricia L. (2000). The 1930s. Weigl Educational Publishers Limited. ISBN 978-1-896990-64-4.
- Bothwell, Robert; Drummond, Ian; English, John (1990). Canada 1900–1945. University of Toronto Press. ISBN 978-0-8020-6801-9.
- Bothwell, Robert; Drummond, Ian M.; English, John (1989). Canada Since 1945: Power, Politics, and Provincialism. University of Toronto Press. ISBN 978-0-8020-6672-5.
- Creighton, Donald. The Forked Road: Canada 1939–1957 (McClelland and Stewart Limited, 1976), general survey.
- Craats, Rennay (2000). The 1940s. Weigl Educational Publishers Limited. ISBN 978-1-896990-62-0.
- Hacker, Carlotta (2000). The 1950s. Weigl Educational Publishers Limited. ISBN 978-1-896990-60-6.
- Thompson, John Herd; Seager, Allen (1986). Canada 1922–1939: decades of discord. McClelland and Stewart. ISBN 978-0-7710-8558-1. standard scholarly survey

=== Politics ===
- Dawson, Robert MacGregor (1959). William Lyon Mackenzie King: 1874–1923. University of Toronto Press. ISBN 9780802053817.
- Kottman, Richard N. (December 1975). "Herbert Hoover and the Smoot-Hawley Tariff: Canada, A Case Study". Journal of American History. 62 (3): 609–635. doi:10.2307/2936217. JSTOR 2936217.
- Lipset, Seymour Martin (1971). Agrarian Socialism: The Cooperative Commonwealth Federation in Saskatchewan: a Study in Political Sociology. University of California Press. ISBN 978-0-520-02056-6.
- McHenry, Dean Eugene (1950). The Third Force in Canada. University of California Press. -
- McNaught, Kenneth (2001). A Prophet in Politics: A Biography of J. S. Woodsworth. University of Toronto Press. ISBN 978-0-8020-8427-9.
- Neatby, H. Blair (2003). The Politics of Chaos. Dundurn. ISBN 978-1-894908-01-6.
- Neatby, H. Blair (1963). William Lyon Mackenzie King: 1924–1932: The lonely heights. University of Toronto Press. ISBN 9780802010834. standard biography
- Neatby, H. Blair (1976). William Lyon Mackenzie King: 1932–1939: The prism of unity. University of Toronto Press. ISBN 9780802022592.
- Robertson, Gordon (2000). Memoirs of a Very Civil Servant: Mackenzie King to Pierre Trudeau. University of Toronto Press. ISBN 978-0-8020-4445-7. A primary source
- Wardhaugh, Robert Alexander (2000). Mackenzie King and the Prairie West. University of Toronto Press. ISBN 978-0-8020-4733-5.

=== Great Depression ===
- Ascah, Robert Laurence (1999). Politics and Public Debt: The Dominion, the Banks and Alberta's Social Credit. University of Alberta. ISBN 978-0-88864-306-3. -
- Baillargeon, Denyse (1999). Making Do: Women, Family and Home in Montreal During the Great Depression. Translated by Klein, Yvonne. Wilfrid Laurier Univ. Press. ISBN 978-0-88920-887-2.
- Berton, Pierre (2012). The Great Depression: 1929–1939. Doubleday Canada. ISBN 978-0-307-37486-8. well-written popular history
- Broadfoot, Barry (2013) [1973]. Ten Lost Years, 1929–1939: Memories of the Canadians Who Survived the Depression. McClelland & Stewart. ISBN 978-1-55199-504-5. Primary sources
- Campbell, Lara (2000). "'We Who Have Wallowed in the Mud of Flanders': First World War Veterans, Unemployment and the Development of Social Welfare in Canada, 1929-39" (PDF). Journal of the Canadian Historical Association. 11 (1): 125–149. doi:10.7202/031134ar.
- Fisher, Robin (Fall 1990). "The Decline of Reform: British Columbia Politics in the 1930s". Journal of Canadian Studies. 25 (3): 74–89. doi:10.3138/jcs.25.3.74. S2CID 151836258 – via Project MUSE.
- Fowke, Vernon Clifford (1957). The national policy and the wheat economy. University of Toronto Press. ISBN 9780802070081.
- Gray, James H. (2004) [1966]. The Winter Years: The Depression on the Prairies. Fifth House Publishers. ISBN 978-1-894856-20-1. describes life in Winnipeg during the depression
- Hoar, Victor, ed. (1969). The Great Depression: Essays and Memoirs from Canada and the United States. Copp Clark. includes recollections of the 1930s
- Hughes, Everett C.; Tepperman, Lorne (2009) [1943]. French Canada in Transition. Oxford University Press. ISBN 978-0-19-542997-8. sociological study
- Klee, Marcus (Spring 2000). "Fighting the Sweatshop in Depression Ontario: Capital, Labour and the Industrial Standards Act". Labour/Le Travail. 45: 13–51. doi:10.2307/25149042. JSTOR 25149042.
- McLachlan, Elizabeth (1999). With Unshakeable Persistence: Rural Teachers of the Depression Era. NeWest Press. ISBN 978-1-896300-11-5.
- Rogers, Sean Harris (2000). Depression and War: Three Essays on the Canadian Economy, 1930–1945 (PhD dissertation). McGill University. DAI 2003 63(7): 2644-2645-A. DANQ70191 Fulltext in ProQuest Dissertations & Theses
- Rooth, Tim; Taylor, Rebecca (2001). "Exports and External Adjustment During the Slump: the British Market, Australia and Canada During the 1930s". Journal of European Economic History. 30 (3): 569–595. ISSN 2499-8281.
- Safarian, A.E. (2009). The Canadian Economy. McGill-Queen's Press. ISBN 978-0-7735-8435-8. standard economic history; has data on public and private investment in the major sectors of the economy
- Schultz, Harold John, ed. (1967). Politics of Discontent. University of Toronto Press. with articles on Aberhart, George McCullagh, Pattullo and the Reconstruction Party.
- Srigley, Katrina (2010). Breadwinning Daughters: Young Working Women in a Depression-era City, 1929–1939. University of Toronto Press. ISBN 978-1-4426-1003-3.
- Srigley, Katrina (Spring 2007). "Clothing Stories: Consumption, Identity, and Desire in Depression-Era Toronto". Journal of Women's History. 19 (1): 82–104. doi:10.1353/jowh.2007.0025. S2CID 145811021.
- Srigley, Katrina (Spring 2005). "'In case you hadn't noticed!': Race, Ethnicity, and Women's Wage-Earning in a Depression-Era City". Labour/Le Travail. 55: 69–105. JSTOR 25149561.

=== Second World War ===
- Bouchery, Jean (2007). Canadian Soldier in World War II: From D-Day to VE-Day. Histoire and Collections. ISBN 978-2-3525-0028-5.
- Ciment, James; Russell, Thaddeus (2007). The Home Front Encyclopedia: United States, Britain, and Canada in World Wars I and II. ABC-CLIO. ISBN 978-1-57607-849-5.
- Copp, J. T. (2006). Cinderella Army: The Canadians in Northwest Europe, 1944–1945. University of Toronto Press. ISBN 978-0-8020-3925-5.
- Granatstein, J. L. (1990). Canada's War: The Politics of the Mackenzie King Government, 1939–1945. University of Toronto Press. ISBN 978-0-8020-6797-5.
- Granatstein, Jack L. (1967). The Politics of Survival: The Conservative Party of Canada, 1939 - 1945. University of Toronto Press. ISBN 978-0-8020-6109-6.
- Granatstein; J. L. The Generals: The Canadian Army's Senior Commanders in the Second World War (University of Calgary Press, 2005) online
- Nakano, Takeo Ujo; Nakano, Leatrice (1983). Within the Barbed Wire Fence: A Japanese Man's Account of His Internment in Canada. Formac Publishing Company Limited. ISBN 978-0-88780-102-0.
- Pierson, Ruth Roach (1986). They're Still Women After All: The Second World War and Canadian Womanhood. McClelland and Stewart. ISBN 978-0-7710-6958-1.
- Roy, Patricia; Granatstein, J.L.; Iino, Masako; Takamura, Hiroko (1990). Mutual hostages: Canadians and Japanese during the Second World War. University of Toronto Press. ISBN 978-0-8020-5774-7.
- Sewell, Sarah Kathleen (January 2013). Making the Necessary Sacrifice: The Military's Impact on a City at War, Calgary, 1939–1945 (PDF) (MA). University of Calgary. Archived from the original (PDF) on 2016-03-04.
- Stacey, C.P. (1970). Arms, Men and Governments: The War Policies of Canada, 1939–1945 (PDF). Government of Canada. Archived from the original (PDF) on 2019-06-20. standard survey
- "Democracy at War: Canadian Newspapers and the Second World War". Canadian War Museum. collection of more than 140,000 newspaper clippings

=== Cold War ===
- Bothwell, Robert. The Big Chill: Canada and the Cold War (Concord: Irwin Publishing, 1998).
- Campbell, Isabel. Unlikely Diplomats: The Canadian Brigade in Germany, 1951-64 (UBC Press, 2013).
- Chapnick, Adam. The Middle Power Project: Canada and the Forming of the United Nations (UBC Press, 2005).
- Donaghy, Greg, ed. (1998). Canada and the Early Cold War, 1943–1957 (PDF). Department of Foreign Affairs and International Trade, Government of Canada. ISBN 978-0-660-60748-1. E2-179/1998.
- Eayrs, James. In Defence of Canada: Peacemaking and Deterrence (U of Toronto Press, 1972).
- English, John. The Worldly Years: The Life of Lester Pearson, Volume II: 1949–1972 (Vintage Books Canada, 1993).
- Holmes, John W. The Shaping of Peace: Canada and the Search for World Order 1943–1957 (2 vol. U of Toronto Press, 1979–82).
- Pearson, Geoffrey. Seize the Day: Lester B. Pearson and Crisis Diplomacy (Carleton UP, 1993).
- Smith, Denis. Diplomacy of Fear: Canada and the Cold War, 1941–1948 (U of Toronto Press, 1988).
- Teigrob, Robert. Warming up to the Cold War: Canada and the United States' coalition of the willing, from Hiroshima to Korea (U of Toronto Press, 2009.
- Thompson, John Herd and Stephen J. Randall. Canada and the United States: Ambivalent Allies (University of Georgia Press, 1994).
- Whitaker, Reginald, and Gary Marcuse. Cold War Canada: The making of a national insecurity state, 1945–1957 (U of Toronto Press, 1994).

== Since 1957 ==
Overviews

- Bothwell, Robert; Drummond, Ian M.; English, John (1989). Canada Since 1945: Power, Politics, and Provincialism (Revised ed.). University of Toronto Press. ISBN 978-0-8020-6672-5.
- Craats, Rennay (2000). The 1970s. Weigl Educational Publishers Limited. ISBN 978-1-896990-42-2.
- Hacker, Carlotta (2000). The 1950s. Weigl Educational Publishers Limited. ISBN 978-1-896990-60-6.
- Palmer, Bryan D. (2009). Canada's 1960s: The Ironies of Identity in a Rebellious Era. University of Toronto Press. ISBN 978-0-8020-9954-9.
- Parker, Janice (2000). The 1980s. Weigl Educational Publishers Limited. ISBN 978-1-896990-40-8.
- Seidlitz, Lauri (2000). The 1990s. Weigl Educational Publishers Limited. ISBN 978-1-896990-38-5.
- Shipton, Rosemary (2000). The 1960s. Weigl Educational Publishers Limited. ISBN 978-1-896990-44-6.

Specific

- Anastakis, Dimitry, ed. (2014). The Sixties: Passion, Politics, and Style. McGill-Queen's Press. ISBN 978-0-7735-7434-2.
- Berton, Pierre (1997). 1967: The Last Good Year. Doubleday Canada. ISBN 978-0-385-25662-9.
- Clarkson, Stephen; McCall, Christina (1997). Trudeau and Our Times. McClelland & Stewart. ISBN 978-0-7710-5405-1.
- Clarkson, Stephen (1985). Canada and the Reagan Challenge: Crisis and Adjustment, 1981-85. James Lorimer. ISBN 978-0-88862-791-9.
- Clarkson, Stephen (2002). Uncle Sam and Us: Globalization, Neoconservatism, and the Canadian State. University of Toronto Press. ISBN 978-0-8020-8539-9.
- Clearwater, John (1998). Canadian Nuclear Weapons: The Untold Story of Canada's Cold War Arsenal. Dundurn. ISBN 978-1-55002-299-5.
- Cohen, Andrew; Granatstein, J.L., eds. (2011) [1998]. Trudeau's Shadow: The Life and Legacy of Pierre Elliott Trudeau. Random House of Canada. ISBN 978-0-307-36385-5.
- Couture, Claude (1998). Paddling with the Current: Pierre Elliott Trudeau, Étienne Parent, Liberalism, and Nationalism in Canada. Translated by Bosley, Vivien. University of Alberta. ISBN 978-0-88864-313-1.
- Eglin, Peter; Hester, Stephen (2003). The Montreal Massacre: A Story of Membership Categorization Analysis. Wilfrid Laurier Univ. Press. ISBN 978-0-88920-422-5.
- English, John (2010). Just Watch Me: The Life of Pierre Elliott Trudeau, 1968–2000. Vintage Canada. ISBN 978-0-676-97524-6.
- Hillmer, Norman, ed. (1999). Pearson: The Unlikely Gladiator. McGill-Queen's Press. ISBN 978-0-7735-1768-4.
- Igartua, Jos E. (2006). The Other Quiet Revolution: National Identities in English Canada, 1945-71. UBC Press. ISBN 978-0-7748-4067-5.
- Jeffrey, Brooke (2010). Divided Loyalties: The Liberal Party of Canada, 1984–2008. University of Toronto Press. ISBN 978-1-4426-1065-1.
- Morton, Desmond (1986). The New Democrats, 1961–1986: The Politics of Change. Copp Clark Pitman. ISBN 978-0-7730-4618-4.
- Romney, Paul (1999). Getting it Wrong: How Canadians Forgot Their Past and Imperilled Confederation. University of Toronto Press. ISBN 978-0-8020-8105-6.
- Simpson, Jeffrey (1996). Discipline of power: the Conservative interlude and the Liberal restoration. University of Toronto Press. ISBN 978-0-8020-7620-5.
- Smith, Denis (2013). Rogue Tory: The Life and Legend of John G. Diefenbaker. McClelland & Stewart. ISBN 978-1-55199-636-3.
- Story, Donald Clarke; Shepard, R. Bruce, eds. (1998). The Diefenbaker legacy: Canadian politics, law, and society since 1957. Canadian Plains Research Center, University of Regina. ISBN 978-0-88977-091-1.
- Tetley, William (2014). October Crisis 1970: An Insider's View. McGill-Queen's Press. ISBN 978-0-7735-7660-5.

== Contemporary ==
- Behiels, Michael D. (Spring 2010). "Stephen Harper's Rise to Power: Will His "New" Conservative Party Become Canada's "Natural Governing Party" of the Twenty-First Century?". American Review of Canadian Studies. 40 (1): 118–145. doi:10.1080/02722010903545418. S2CID 144294198.
- Blattberg, Charles (2003). Shall We Dance?: A Patriotic Politics for Canada. McGill-Queen's Press. ISBN 978-0-7735-2596-2.
- Clift, Dominique (1982). Quebec Nationalism in Crisis. McGill-Queen's Press. ISBN 978-0-7735-0383-0.
- Cody, Howard (2008). "Minority Government in Canada: The Stephen Harper Experience". American Review of Canadian Studies. 38 (1): 27–42. doi:10.1080/02722010809481819. S2CID 155065488.
- Flanagan, Tom (2009). Harper's Team: Behind the Scenes in the Conservative Rise to Power. McGill-Queen's Press. ISBN 978-0-7735-7538-7.
- Noël, Alain; Fortin, Sarah; St-Hilaire, France (2003). Forging the Canadian Social Union: SUFA and Beyond. Institute for Research on Public Policy. ISBN 978-0-88645-194-3.
- Hébert, Chantal (2011). French Kiss: Stephen Harper's Blind Date with Quebec. Knopf Canada. ISBN 978-0-307-36946-8.
- Johnson, William (2009). Stephen Harper and the Future of Canada. McClelland & Stewart. ISBN 978-1-55199-220-4.
- Malcolmson, Patrick; Myers, Richard (2009). The Canadian Regime: An Introduction to Parliamentary Government in Canada (Fourth ed.). University of Toronto Press. ISBN 978-1-4426-0047-8.
- Nikiforuk, Andrew (2010). Tar Sands: Dirty Oil and the Future of a Continent. Greystone Books. ISBN 978-1-55365-627-2.
- Plamondon, Bob (2014). Full Circle: Death and Resurrection in Canadian Conservative Politics. Great River Media. ISBN 978-1-4566-2316-6.
- Quarter, Jack; Mook, Laurie; Armstrong, Ann (2009). Understanding the Social Economy: A Canadian Perspective. University of Toronto Press. ISBN 978-0-8020-9645-6.
- Roach, Kent (2003). 11-Sep: Consequences for Canada. McGill-Queen's Press. ISBN 978-0-7735-2585-6.
- Sweeny, Alastair (2010). Black Bonanza: Canada's Oil Sands and the Race to Secure North America's Energy Future. John Wiley & Sons. ISBN 978-0-470-67583-0.
- Tavidze, Albert (2007). Progress in Economics Research. Vol. 12. Nova Publishers. ISBN 978-1-60021-720-3.
- Wells, Paul (2007). Right Side Up: The Fall of Paul Martin and the Rise of Stephen Harper's New Conservatism. McClelland & Stewart. ISBN 978-1-55199-209-9.

== Military history ==
- Barris, Ted (2010) [1999]. Deadlock in Korea: Canadians at War, 1950–1953. Dundurn. ISBN 978-0-88762-820-7.
- Benedict, Michael, ed. (1997). Canada at War. Toronto: Penguin. ISBN 978-0-1402-6474-6.
- Bercuson, David J. (1999). Blood on the Hills: The Canadian Army in the Korean War. University of Toronto Press. ISBN 0-8020-0980-8.
- Black, Jeremy (2011). Fighting for America: The Struggle for Mastery in North America, 1519–1871. Indiana University Press. ISBN 978-0-253-35660-4.
- Buckley, Brian (2000). Canada's early nuclear policy: fate, chance and character. McGill-Queen's Press - MQUP. ISBN 978-0-7735-2077-6.
- Clearwater, John (1998). Canadian nuclear weapons: the untold story of Canada's Cold War arsenal. Dundurn Press Ltd. ISBN 978-1-55002-299-5.
- Cook, Tim (2006). Clio's warriors: Canadian historians and the writing of the World Wars. Vancouver: UBC Press. ISBN 9780774841252.
- Dickson, Paul Douglas (2007). A Thoroughly Canadian General: A Biography of General H.D.G. Crerar. University of Toronto Press. ISBN 9780802008022.
- Morton, Desmond (1999). A Military History of Canada (4th ed.). Toronto: McClelland and Stewart. ISBN 978-0-7710-6514-9.
- Granatstein, J.L. and Dean F. Oliver. (2010). The Oxford companion to Canadian military history. (Toronto: Oxford University Press).
- Granatstein, J.L. (2011). "'What is to be Done?' The Future of Canadian Second World War History". Canadian Military Journal. 11 (2). historiography
- Granatstein; J.L. The Generals: The Canadian Army's Senior Commanders in the Second World War (University of Calgary Press, 2005).
- Granatstein, J.L. (2004), Canada's army: waging war and keeping the peace, University of Toronto Press, ISBN 978-0-8020-8696-9
- Granatstein, J.L. and David Bercuson. War and Peacekeeping: From South Africa to the Gulf- Canada's Limited Wars (Toronto: Key Porter Books, 1991).
- Granatstein, J.L. and David Stafford. Spy Wars: Espionage and Canada from Gouzenko to Glasnost (Key Porter Books, 1990).
- Grey, Jeffrey. The Commonwealth Armies and the Korean War: An Alliance Study (Manchester UP, 1988).
- Harris, Stephen. (1988). Canadian Brass: The making of a professional army, 1860–1939 (Toronto: U. of Toronto Press).
- Horn, Bernd and Stephen Harris, eds. (2001). Warrior chiefs: Perspectives on senior Canadian military leaders. (Toronto: Dundurn Press).
- Humphries, Mark Osborne, ed. (2008). The selected papers of Sir Arthur Currie: Diaries, letters, and report to the Ministry, (1917–1933. (Waterloo: Wilfrid Laurier University Press).
- Kasurak, Peter. A National Force: The Evolution of Canada's Army, 1950–2000 (Vancouver: UBC Press, 2013).
- Maloney, Sean. Canada and UN Peacekeeping: Cold War by Other Means (St. Catherines: Vanwell Publishing, 2002).
- Maloney, Sean. Learning to Love the Bomb: Canada's Nuclear Weapons During the Cold War (Potomac Books, Inc., 2007).
- Melady, John. Korea: Canada's Forgotten War (Macmillan of Canada, 1983).
- Meyers, Edward C. Thunder in the Morning Calm: The Royal Canadian Navy in Korea: 1950–1955. (St. Catherines: Vanwell, 1992)
- Milner, Marc. Canadian military history. (Toronto: Copp Clark Putnam, 1993).
- Milner, Marc. Canada's navy: The first century. 2nd edition. (University of Toronto Press, 2010).
- Morton, Desmond. A Military History of Canada: From Champlain to the Gulf War (McClellan and Stewart Inc., 1992).
- Morton, Desmond. (1981). Canada and war: A military and political history. Toronto: Butterworths
- Nicholson, Gerald W. L. The fighting Newfoundlanders: A history of the Royal Newfoundland Regiment. (2nd ed. McGill-Queen's University Press, 2006,).
- Richter, Andrew (2002), Avoiding Armageddon: Canadian military strategy and nuclear weapons, 1950-63, UBC Press, ISBN 978-0-7748-0888-0
- Rickard, John. Politics of Command: Lieutenant-General A.G.L. McNaughton and the Canadian Army, 1939–1943 (2009)
- Stanley, George F.G. Canada's soldiers: The military history of an unmilitary people. (Toronto: Macmillan, 1974)
- Tucker, Spencer C.; Arnold, James (2011). The Encyclopedia of North American Indian Wars, 1607–1890. ABC-CLIO. ISBN 978-1-85109-697-8.
- Zuehlke, Mark (2006), Canadian Military Atlas: Four Centuries of Conflict from New France to Kosovo, Douglas & McIntyre, ISBN 978-1-55365-209-0

=== First World War ===
- Cook, Tim (January 2002). "'Literary memorials': The Great War regimental histories, 1919–1939". Journal of the Canadian Historical Association. 13 (1): 167–190. doi:10.7202/031158ar.
- Cook, Tim (December 2004). "The Madman and the Butcher: Sir Sam Hughes, Sir Arthur Currie, and Their War of Reputations". Canadian Historical Review. 85 (4): 693–720. doi:10.3138/CHR.85.4.693.
- Copp, Terry (2005). "The military effort, 1914–1918". In David MacKenzie (ed.). Canada and the First World War. University of Toronto Press. pp. 35–61. ISBN 0-8020-3573-6.
- Dancocks, Daniel G. (1985). Sir Arthur Currie: A biography. (Toronto: Methuen)
- Dancocks, Daniel G. (1986). Legacy of Valour: The Canadians at Passchendaele. (Edmonton: Hurtig Publishers).
- Dancocks, Daniel G. (1988). Welcome to Flanders Fields, the first Canadian battle of the Great War: Ypres, 1915. (Toronto: McClelland & Stewart.
- Duguid, A.F. (1938). Official history of the Canadian forces in the Great War, 1914–1919. Vol. 1. (Ottawa: King's Printer.
- Evans Shaw, Susan. (2011). Canadians at war: A guide to the battlefields of World War I. (Fredericton: Goose Lane Editions)
- Freeman, Bill and Richard Nielson. (1999). Far from home: Canadians in the First World War. (Toronto: McGraw-Hill Ryerson)
- Granatstein, J.L. (2004). Hell's corner: An illustrated history of Canada's Great War 1914–1918. Vancouver/(Toronto: Douglas and McIntyre)
- Gray, David. (2012). "Carrying Canadian troops: The story of RMS Olympic as a First World War troopship," Canadian Military History, Vol. 11(1), 54–70.
- Hadley, Michael L. and Roger Sarty. (1991). Tin-pots and pirate ships: Canadian naval forces and German sea raiders, 1880–1918. (Montreal and Kingston: McGill-Queen's University Press).
- Haycock, Ronald G. (1986). Sam Hughes: The public career of a controversial Canadian, 1885–1916. (Wilfrid Laurier University Press).
- Hayes, Geoffrey, Andrew Iarocci and Mike Bechthold. eds. (2007). Vimy Ridge: A Canadian reassessment. (Waterloo: Wilfrid Laurier University Press).
- Humphries, Mark Osborne (2014). "Between Commemoration and History: The Historiography of the Canadian Corps and Military Overseas". Canadian Historical Review. 95 (3): 384–397. doi:10.3138/chr.95.3.384. S2CID 162203521.
- Hyatt, A.M.J. (1987). General Sir Arthur Currie: A military biography (Toronto. U. of Toronto Press).
- Iarocci, Andrew, and Mike Bechthold, eds. Vimy Ridge: A Canadian reassessment (Waterloo: Wilfrid Laurier University Press)
- Iarocci, Andrew. (2009). "On the threshold of modernity: Canadian horsepower on the Western Front, 1914–18," Journal of the Society for Army Historical Research pp 59–83.
- Mackenzie, David, ed. Canada and the First World War (2005); 16 specialized essays by scholars
- Macphail, Andrew. (1925). Official history of the Canadian forces in the Great War, 1914–19. The Medical Services, ((Ottawa: King's Printer)
- Morton, Desmond. (1979). "Junior but sovereign allies': The transformation of the Canadian Expeditionary Force, 1914–1918," Journal of Imperial and Commonwealth History 8#1 pp: 56–67.
- Morton, Desmond. (1992). Silent battle: Canadian prisoners of war in Germany, 1914–1919. (Toronto: Lester Publishing.
- Morton, Desmond. (1993). When your number's up: The Canadian soldier in the First World War. (Toronto: Random House of Canada)
- Morton, Desmond. (2007). A military history of Canada. (Toronto: McClelland & Stewart).
- Morton, Desmond and J.L. Granatstein. (1989). Marching to Armageddon: Canadians and the Great War 1914–1919. (Toronto: Lester & Orpen Dennys)
- Tennyson, Brian Douglas. Canada's Great War, 1914–1918: How Canada Helped Save the British Empire and Became a North American Nation (2014).
- Wise, Sydney F. (1980). Canadian Airmen and the First World War (1980 ed.). University of Toronto Press. ISBN 9780802023797. - Total pages: 771 (Also published in French under the title: Les aviateurs canadiens dans la Première Guerre mondiale)

=== Official histories ===
- "Official histories". Canada.ca. Government of Canada. 7 March 2018.

==== First World War ====
- Duguid, A.F. (1938). Official History of the Canadian Forces in the Great War, 1914-1919 (PDF). Vol. I, Part 1. Ottawa: King's Printer.
- Duguid, A.F. (1938). Official History of the Canadian Forces in the Great War, 1914-1919 (PDF). Vol. I, Part 2. Ottawa: King's Printer.
- Nicholson, G.W.L. (1964). Official history of the Canadian Army in the First World War: Canadian Expeditionary Force 1914–1919 (PDF). Ottawa: Queen's Printer.

==== Second World War ====
- Stacey, C.P. (1955). Official History of the Canadian Army in the Second World War (PDF). Vol. I Six Years of War. Ottawa: Queen's Printer.
- Nicholson, G.W.L. (1956). Official History of the Canadian Army in the Second World War (PDF). Vol. II The Canadians in Italy, 1943–1945. Ottawa: Queen's Printer.
- Stacey, C.P. (1960). Official History of the Canadian Army in the Second World War (PDF). Vol. III The Victory Campaign: The Operations in Northwest Europe, 1944–45. Ottawa: Queen's Printer.

==== Korea ====
- Wood, F.W. (1966). Official History of the Canadian Army in Korea: Strange Battleground (PDF). Ottawa: Queen's Printer.

== Economic history ==
=== General ===
- List of Economic Surveys of Canada 1961-present - by the Organisation for Economic Co-operation and Development
- Baldwin, John R., and Petr Hanel. Innovation and Knowledge Creation in an Open Economy: Canadian Industry and International Implications (2007)
- Berton, Pierre. The Great Depression: 1929–1939 (1990) is a popular account
- Burton, F. W. "Wheat in Canadian History," The Canadian Journal of Economics and Political Science Vol. 3, No. 2 (May, 1937), pp. 210–217
- Drummond, Ian M. (1987). Progress Without Planning: The Economic History of Ontario from Confederation to the Second World War. Heritage Series. University of Toronto Press. ISBN 978-1-4426-5395-5. JSTOR 10.3138/j.ctt1h1ht6s.
- Glazebrook, G. P. de T. A History of Transportation in Canada (1938)
- Innis, Harold. A., and A. R. M. Lower; Select Documents in Canadian Economic History, 1783–1885 University of Toronto Press, 1933, primary sources
- Mackintosh, W.A. "The Laurentian Plateau in Canadian Economic Development," Economic Geography, Vol. 2, No. 4 (Oct., 1926), pp. 537–549
- Marr, William L. and Donald Patterson. Canada: An Economic History, 1980.
- Neill, Robin (1991) A history of Canadian economic thought, Routledge
- Norrie, Kenneth, Douglas Owram, and J.C. Herbert Emery. A History of the Canadian Economy 4th ed. (2007)
- Russell, Peter A. Farming in the Nineteenth Century (2012), 400pp; covers Ontario, Quebec and Manitoba
- Sandwell, R. W. "Notes toward a history of rural Canada, 1870-1940." in Social Transformation in Rural Canada: Community, Cultures, and Collective Action (2013): 21–42.
- Young, John H (1955). "Comparative Economic Development: Canada and the United States". American Economic Review. 45 (2): 80–93. JSTOR 1823543.

=== Business history ===
- Bliss, Michael. Northern Enterprise: Five Centuries of Canadian Business. McClelland and Stewart, (1987).
- Bordo, Michael D., Angela Redish, and Hugh Rockoff. "Why Didn't Canada Have a Banking Crisis in 2008 (or in 1930, or 1907, or . . .)?" Economic History Review 68#1 (2015): 218–43
- Fleming, Keith R. Power at Cost: Ontario Hydro and Rural Electrification, 1911–1958. McGill-Queen's U. Press, (1992). 326 pp.
- Frost, James D. Merchant princes: Halifax's first family of finance, ships, and steel (2003)
- Klassen, Henry C. A Business History of Alberta (1999) 362 pp.
- Kottman, Richard N. "Herbert Hoover and the Smoot–Hawley Tariff: Canada, A Case Study", Journal of American History (1975), 62#3 pp 609–635 in JSTOR
- Laxer, Gordon. Open for Business: The Roots of Foreign Ownership in Canada. (Toronto: Oxford University Press, 1989).
- Lingenfelter, Richard E., ed. The Mining West: A Bibliography & Guide to the History & Literature of Mining in the American & Canadian West. 2 vol Scarecrow, 2003. 1550 pp
- McDonald, Judith; O'Brien, Anthony Patrick; Callahan, Colleen. "Trade Wars: Canada's Reaction to the Smoot–Hawley Tariff", Journal of Economic History (1997), 57#4 pp 802–826, in JSTOR
- Myers, Gustavus (1972), A history of Canadian wealth, Lewis and Samuel online, on the super-rich
- Naylor, Tom. The History of Canadian Business. 1867–1914 2 vol (1976)
- Neufeld, Edward Peter. The Financial System of Canada: Its Growth and Development. Macmillan of Canada, 1972.
- Porter, John. "Concentration of Economic Power and the Economic Elite in Canada," The Canadian Journal of Economics and Political Science, Vol. 22, No. 2 (May, 1956), pp. 199–220
- Roberts, David. In the Shadow of Detroit: Gordon M. McGregor, Ford of Canada, and Motoropolis. Wayne State U. Press, 2006. 320 pp.
- Santink, Joy L. Timothy Eaton and the Rise of His Department Store. U. of Toronto Press, 1990. 319 pp.
- Taylor, Graham D. and Peter Baskerville. A Concise History of Business in Canada (1994)
- Watts, George. The Bank of Canada: Origins and Early History (Carleton University Press, 1993)
- Williams, Glen. Not for Export: The International Competitiveness of Canadian Manufacturing. Toronto: McClelland and Stewart, 3rd edition, 1994.

=== Natural resources, energy, oil, lumber ===
- Atomic Energy Canada Limited (1997), Canada enters the nuclear age, McGill-Queen's University Press, ISBN 978-0-7735-1601-4
- Desbiens, Caroline. Power from the North: Territory, Identity, and the Culture of Hydroelectricity in Quebec (2014)
- Doern, G. Bruce; Robert W. Morrison; Arslan Dorman (2001). Canadian nuclear energy policy: changing ideas, institutions, and interests. University of Toronto Press. ISBN 978-0-8020-4788-5.
- Foster, Peter. The Blue-Eyed Sheiks: The Canadian Oil Establishment. Collins, 1979.
- Froschauer, Karl. White gold: Hydroelectric Power in Canada. Vancouver: UBC Press, 1999. excerpt and text search
- Gillis, Robert Peter. "The Ottawa lumber barons and the conservation movement 1880–1914." Journal of Canadian Studies 9#1 (1974): 14–30. online
- Le Riche, Timothy. Alberta's Oil Patch - The People, Politics & Companies (2006)
- Levant, Ezra (2011). Ethical Oil: The Case for Canada's Oil Sands. McClelland & Stewart. ISBN 9780771046438.
- Lower, A.R.M. The North American Assault on the Canadian Forest (1938).
- Nelles, H. V. The Politics of Development: Forests, Mines, and Hydro-Electric Power in Ontario, 1849-1941. Archon Books, 1974.
- Pratt, Larry. The Tar Sands: Syncrude and the Politics of Oil. Hurtig, 1976.
- Steed, Roger G (2007), Nuclear Power in Canada and Beyond, General Store Pub. House, ISBN 978-1-897113-51-6
- Sweeny, Alastair. Black Bonanza: Alberta's Oil Sands and the Race to Secure North America's Energy Future. John Wiley & Sons, 2010.* Taylor, Graham D (1985). "Sun Oil Company and Great Canadian Oil Sands Ltd.: The Financing and Management of a 'Pioneer' Enterprise, 1962–1974". Journal of Canadian Studies. 20 (3): 102–121. doi:10.3138/jcs.20.3.102. S2CID 157648082.

=== Labour and working class ===
- Abella, Irving M. On strike; six key labour struggles in Canada, 1919–1949 (James, Lewis & Samuel 1974) ISBN 0-88862-057-8
- Babcock, Robert H. Gompers in Canada: a study in American continentalism before the First World War (1974) online at ACLS e-books
- Bradbury, Bettina. Working families: Age, gender, and daily survival in industrializing Montreal (1993)
- Craig Heron. The Canadian Labour Movement: A Brief History, 1996.
- Craven, Paul, ed., Labouring lives: work and workers in nineteenth-century Ontario (1995)
- Davis, Angela E. (1995) Art and work: a social history of labour in the Canadian graphic arts industry to the 1940s McGill-Queen's University Press ISBN 0-7735-1280-2
- Frager, Ruth A., and Carmela K. Patrias, eds. Discounted Labour: Women Workers in Canada, 1870–1939 (2005) online
- Forsey, Eugene Alfred. Trade unions in Canada, 1812–1902 (1982).
- Frank, David. J. B. McLachlan: A Biography: The Story of a Legendary Labour Leader and the Cape Breton Coal Miners (1999)
- Haddow, Rodney, and Thomas Klassen. Partisanship, Globalization, and Canadian Labour Market Policy: Four Provinces in Comparative Perspective (2006)
- Heron, Craig. The Canadian Labour Movement: A Brief History, (1996).
- Hertel; D. W. History of the Brotherhood of Maintenance of Way Employees: Its Birth and Growth, 1887–1955. (1955)
- Horowitz, Gad. Canadian Labour in Politics (1968), Covers 1930–1965
- Jamieson, Stuart. Times of Trouble: Labour Unrest and Industrial Conflict in Canada, 1900–1966 (1968), Detailed coverage of strikes
- Kealey, Gregory S (1995), Workers and Canadian history, McGill-Queen's University Press, ISBN 978-0-7735-1352-5
- Kealey, Gregory S. Dreaming of what might be: the Knights of Labor in Ontario, 1880–1900 (1982) excerpt and text search
- Kealey, Greg. "Writing about Labour" in Schultz, ed. Writing About Canada: A Handbook for Modern Canadian History (1990), pp 145–74
- Lipton, Charles. The Trade Union Movement in Canada 1827–1959 (1966), a standard history from a Marxist perspective
- Logan, Harold. Trade Unions in Canada (1948), large amount of factual information
- MacEwan, Paul. Miners and Steelworkers: Labour in Cape Breton (1976)
- Morton, Desmond. Working People: An Illustrated History of the Canadian Labour Movement (1999)
- Ogmundson, Richard, and Michael Doyle. "The rise and decline of Canadian Labour/1960 to 2000: Elites, power, ethnicity and gender." Canadian Journal of Sociology/Cahiers canadiens de sociologie (2002): 413–454.
- Palmer, Bryan D. Working Class Experience: Rethinking the History of Canadian Labour, 1800–1991 (1992)
- Robin, Martin. Radical Politics and Labour in Canada (1968), left-wing politics 1880–1930

==== Historiography ====
- Abella, Irving M. "Labour and working-class history" in * Granatstein and Stevens, eds. A Reader's Guide to Canadian History: Confederation to the Present (1982) pp 114–36.
- Kealey, Gregory S. "Labour and working-class history in Canada: Prospects in the 1980s." Labour/Le Travail (1981): 67–94.
- Morton, Desmond. "Some millennial reflections on the state of Canadian labour history." Labour/Le Travail (2000): 11–36. online
- Palmer, Bryan D. "Working-Class Canada: Recent Historical Writing." Queen's Quarterly 86.4 (1979): 594+
- Vaisey, G. Douglas (1980)The Labour Companion: A Bibliography Of Canadian Labour History Based On Materials Printed From 1950 To 1975, James Lorimer & Company ISBN 0-88862-522-7

=== Railways ===
- Andreae, Christopher. Lines of Country: An Atlas of Railway and Waterway History in Canada (1996)
- Baskerville, Peter (1979). "On the Rails: Trends in Canadian Railway Historiography". American Review of Canadian Studies. 9 (1): 63–72. doi:10.1080/02722017909480875.
- Baskerville, Peter (1990). "Hickson, Sir Joseph". In Halpenny, Francess G. (ed.). Dictionary of Canadian Biography. Vol. XII (1891–1900) (online ed.). University of Toronto Press.
- Baskerville, Peter (1981). "Americans in Britain's backyard: the railway era in Upper Canada, 1850–1880". Business History Review. 55 (3): 314–36. doi:10.2307/3114127. JSTOR 3114127. S2CID 155762840.
- Berton Pierre. The Last Spike: The Great Railway, 1881–1885 (2001) excerpt and text search, popular history
- Brown, Ron. The Train Doesn't Stop Here Any More (1998) an illustrated history of railway stations in Canada
- Currie, A. W. The Grand Trunk Railway of Canada. University of Toronto Press, 1957. 556 pp, the standard history
- Eagle, J. A. (1989). The Canadian Pacific Railway and the Development of Western Canada, 1896–1914. McGill-Queen's University Press. ISBN 978-0-7735-0674-9.
- Fleming, R. B. The Railway King of Canada: Sir William Mackenzie, 1849–1923 University of British Columbia Press, 1991
- Fournier, Leslie T. Railway Nationalization in Canada: The Problem of the Canadian National Railways (1937)
- Fournier, Leslie T. (June 1931). "The Canadian National Railway versus the Canadian Pacific: A Comparative Study". The Journal of Political Economy. 39 (3): 369–389. doi:10.1086/254215. JSTOR 1822288. S2CID 154093618.
- Freeman, Kenneth D. et al. The Growth and Performance of the Canadian Transcontinental Railways 1956–1981 (1987)
- Hertel; D. W. History of the Brotherhood of Maintenance of Way Employees: Its Birth and Growth, 1887–1955 (1955) online
- Hofsommer, Don L. Grand Trunk Corporation: Canadian National Railways in the United States, 1971–1992. 1995. 227 pp. online
- Kaye, Lamb W. History of the Canadian Pacific Railway. (1977).
- Lavallee, Omer (2005). Narrow Gauge Railways of Canada. Revised by Ronald S. Ritchie (expanded and revised ed.). Markham, Ontario: Fitzhenry and Whiteside. ISBN 1-55041-830-0.
- Leonard, Frank. A Thousand Blunders: The Grand Trunk Pacific Railway and Northern British Columbia University of British Columbia Press, 1996
- Martin, J. Edward (1994). On A Streak of Lightning: Electric Railways in Canada. Studio E. ISBN 978-0920716038.
- Murray, Tom (2011), Rails Across Canada The History of Canadian Pacific and Canadian National Railways., Voyageur Pr, ISBN 978-0-7603-4008-0
- den Otter, A.A. The Philosophy of Railways: The Transcontinental Railway Idea in British North America University of Toronto Press, 1997.
- Regehr, Theodore D. (1998). "Hays, Charles Melville". In Cook, Ramsay; Hamelin, Jean (eds.). Dictionary of Canadian Biography. Vol. XIV (1911–1920) (online ed.). University of Toronto Press.
- Regehr, T. D. The Canadian Northern Railway Macmillan of Canada 1976
- Smith, Douglas N. W. (2004). A Century of Travel on the Ontario Northland Railway. Ottawa: Trackside Canada. ISBN 0-9730521-1-2.
- Stevens, G. History of the Canadian National Railways Macmillan Company 1973
- Tretheway, Michael W.; Waters, W. G.; Fok, Andy K. (January 1997). "The Total Factor Productivity of the Canadian Railways, 1956–91". Journal of Transport Economics and Policy. 31 (1). University of Bath: 93–113. ISSN 0022-5258.
- Underwood, Jay (2006). Built for War: Canada's Intercolonial Railway. Railfare DC Books. ISBN 9781897190012.
- Weaver, R. Kent. The Politics of Industrial Change: Railway Policy in North America (1985)
- Willson, Beckles. The Life of Lord Strathcona and Mount Royal 1915.

=== Company histories ===
==== Banks ====
- Denison, Merrill. Canada's First Bank: A History of the Bank of Montreal. McClelland and Stewart, 1966.
- McDowall, Duncan. Quick to the Frontier: Canada's Royal Bank. McClelland and Stewart, 1993.
- Schull, Joseph. 100 Years of Banking in Canada: A History of the Toronto-Dominion Bank. Copp Clark, 1958.
- Schull, Joseph and J. Douglas Gibson. The Scotiabank Story: A History the Bank of Nova Scotia, 1832-1982. Macmillan, 1982.
- Skelton, Oscar. The Dominion Bank, 1871-1921: Fifty Years of Banking Service. The Dominion Bank, 1922.
- Various authors. A History of the Canadian Bank of Commerce (vol. 1-3); A History of Canadian Imperial Bank of Commerce (vol. 4-5).

==== Brewing ====
- Bellamy, Matthew. Brewed in the North: A History of Labatt's. McGill-Queen's University Press, 2019.
- Denison, Merrill. The Barley and the Stream: The Molson Story. McClelland and Stewart, 1955.
- Shea, Albert. Vision in Action: The Story of Canadian Breweries Limited from 1930 to 1955. Canadian Breweries, 1955.

==== Insurance ====
- Bennett, Richard. A House of Quality It Has Ever Been: History of the Great-West Life Assurance Company. Great West Life, 1992.
- Campbell, James, and Edward Tufts. The Story of the London Life Insurance Company. London Life, 1966.
- Cruickshank, W. H. Our First 75 Years: Crown Life Insurance Company, 1900-1975. Crown Life Insurance, 1976.
- Manufacturers Life Insurance Company. The First Sixty Years, 1887-1947: A History of the Manufacturers Life Insurance Company. Manufacturers Life, 1947.
- McQueen, Rod. Who Killed Confederation Life? The Inside Story. McClelland and Stewart, 1996.
- Schull, Joseph. The Century of the Sun: The First Hundred Years of Sun Life Assurance Company of Canada. Macmillan, 1972.
- Tyrwhitt, Janice. Small Things Grow Great: The First 150 Years of the Canada Life Assurance Company. Canada Life, 1996.

==== Trusts ====
- Bruce, Harry. A Century at Central Trust: The Story of Its Growth. Nimbus Publishing, 1987.
- Collard, Edward. A Very Human Story: A Brief History of the Royal Trust Company, Its First 75 Years. Royal Trust, 1975.
- Merifield, Russell R. From Country Trust to National Trust. National Trust Company, 1988.
- Smith, Philip. The Trust-Builders: The Remarkable Rise of Canada Trust. Macmillan, 1989.
- Skodyn, Basil (ed.). The Permanent Story, 1855-1980. Canada Permanent Mortgage Corporation, 1980.
- Stevens, George. The Canada Permanent Story, 1855-1955. Canada Permanent Mortgage, 1955.
- Webb, John. Yorkshire Trust: A 90 Year History. Yorkshire Trust, 1978.

==== Petroleum and pipelines ====
- Consumers Gas Company. A Tradition of Service: The Story of Consumers Gas. Consumers Gas Company, 1993.
- Foster, Peter. From Rigs to Riches: The Story of Bow Valley Industries. Bow Valley Industries, 1985.
- Gray, Earle. Wildcatters: The Story of Pacific Petroleums and Westcoast Transmission. McClelland and Stewart, 1982.
- Hudson's Bay Oil and Gas Company. The New Company at 50: 1926-1976. Hudson's Bay Oil and Gas, 1976.
- Kilbourn, William. Pipeline: TransCanada and the Great Debate, a History of Business and Politics. Clarke Irwin, 1970.
- Lauriston, Victor. Blue Flame of Service: A History of the Union Gas Company and the Natural Gas Industry in Southwestern Ontario. Union Gas Company, 1961.
- Lyon, Jim. Dome: The Rise and Fall of the House that Jack Built. Macmillan, 1983.
- Magladry, Ray. Shell in Canada: The Path of Growth, 1911-1986. Shell Canada Limited, 1986.
- McKenzie-Brown, Peter. The Richness of Discovery: Amoco's First 50 Years in Canada, 1948-1998. Amoco Canada Petroleum, 1998.
- PanCanadian Petroleum. Railways to Resources: The Evolution of PanCanadian Petroleum. PanCanadian Petroleum Limited, 1966.
- Penner, David. The Story of Ranger Oil. GRP Enterprises, 2004.
- Smith, Philip. The Treasure-Seekers: The Men Who Built Home Oil. Macmillan, 1978.
- Taylor, Graham. Imperial Standard: Imperial Oil, Exxon, and the Canadian Oil Industry from 1880. University of Calgary Press, 2019.

==== Metals and mining ====
- Campbell, Duncan. Global Mission: The Story of Alcan. Alcan Aluminium, 1990.
- Girdwood, Charles P.; Jones, Lawrence F.; Lonn, George. The Big Dome: Over Seventy Years of Gold Mining in Canada. Cybergraphics Company, 1983.
- Kilbourn, William. The Elements Combined: A History of the Steel Company of Canada. Clarke, Irwin, 1960.
- McDowell, Duncan. Steel at the Sault: Francis H. Clergue, Sir James Dunn and the Algoma Steel Corporation, 1901-1956. University of Toronto Press, 1984.
- Row, William. The Illustrated History of Kerr Addison Gold Mines Limited, Kerr Addison Mines Limited and Subsidiaries. Kerr Addison Mines Limited, 1984.
- Thompson, John F. and Norman Beasley. For the Years to Come: A Story of International Nickel of Canada. Putnam, 1960.

==== Pulp, paper, and power ====
- Boothman, Barry. Corporate Cataclysm: Abitibi Power & Paper and the Collapse of the Newsprint Industry, 1912-1946. University of Toronto Press, 2020.
- Denison, Merrill. The People's Power: The History of Ontario Hydro. McClelland and Stewart, 1960.
- McDowall, Dunan. The Light: Brazilian Traction, Light and Power Company Limited, 1899-1945. University of Toronto Press, 1988.
- Smith, Philip. Brinco: The Story of Churchill Falls. McClelland and Stewart, 1975.
- White, Clinton. Power for a Province: A History of Saskatchewan Power. Canadian Plains Research Center, 1976.

==== Others ====
- Ashley, Charles. The First Twenty-Five Years: A Study of Trans-Canada Air Lines. Macmillan, 1963.
- Collard, Edward. Passage to the Sea: The Story of Canada Steamship Lines. Doubleday, 1991.
- Denison, Merrill. Harvest Triumphant: The Story of Massey-Harris. McClelland and Stewart, 1949.
- MacKay, Donald. Empire of Wood: The MacMillan Bloedel Story. Douglas and McIntyre, 1982.
- Nesbitt Jr., A. R. Deane. Dry Goods and Pickles: The Story of Nesbitt, Thomson. The author, 1989.
- Sweeny, Alastair. BlackBerry Planet: The Story of Research in Motion and the Little Device that Took the World by Storm. John Wiley & Sons, 2009.

== Political and legal ==
- Argyle, Ray. Turning Points: The Campaigns That Changed Canada - 2011 and Before (2011) excerpt and text search, ch 5
- Auger, Michel; Edwards, Peter (2004), The encyclopedia of Canadian organized crime: from Captain Kidd to Mom Boucher, Marks & Spencer ISBN 0-7710-3044-4
- Cook, Ramsay, ed. French-Canadian Nationalism; An Anthology (Macmillan of Canada, 1969).
- Courtney, John C; David E. Smith. The Oxford handbook of Canadian politics (Oxford University Press, 2010)
- Craik, Neil et al., eds. Public Law: Cases, materials, and commentary (Toronto: Emond Montgomery Publications, 2006).
- Dyck, Rand. Canadian Politics, Concise Fifth Edition (Cengage Learning, 2011)
- Fierlbeck, Katherine. Political Thought in Canada: An Intellectual History, Broadview Press, 2006
- Greene, Ian The Charter of Rights (1989), James Lorimer and Company, ISBN 1-55028-185-2
- Jones, Richard. Community in crisis : French-Canadian nationalism in perspective (McClelland and Stewart, 1967).
- McKay, Ian. Rebels, Reds, Radicals: Rethinking Canada's Left History, Between the Lines, 2006.
- Mann, Susan. Action Française: French Canadian nationalism in the twenties (University of Toronto Press, 1975).
- Monet, Jacques. The Last Cannon Shot; A Study of French-Canadian Nationalism, 1837–1850 (University of Toronto Press, 1969).
- Morton, Frederick Lee. Law, politics, and the judicial process in Canada (University of Calgary Press, 2002).
- Schneider, Stephen. Iced: The Story of Organized Crime in Canada (Wiley, 2009)

=== British roles ===
- Buckner, Phillip Alfred. The transition to responsible government: British policy in British North America, 1815–1850 (1985).
- Jasanoff, Maya. Liberty’s Exiles: The Loss of America and the Remaking of the British Empire (2011).
- Kaufman, Will, and Heidi Slettedahl Macpherson, eds. Britain and the Americas: Culture, Politics, and History (3 vol 2005), 1157pp; encyclopedic coverage.
- Lyon, Peter. Britain and Canada: Survey of a Changing Relationship (1976)
- Martin, Ged. "Attacking the Durham Myth: Seventeen Years On." Journal of Canadian Studies 25.1 (1990): 39–59.
- Martin, Ged. Britain and the Origins of Canadian Confederation, 1837-67 (2001).
- Messamore, Barbara Jane. Canada's Governors General, 1847–1878: Biography and Constitutional Evolution (U of Toronto Press, 2006).
- Smith, Andrew. "Patriotism, self-interest and the ‘Empire effect’: Britishness and British decisions to invest in Canada, 1867–1914." Journal of Imperial and Commonwealth History 41.1 (2013): 59–80.

== Cultural history, popular culture ==
- Beckwith, John (1997), Music papers: articles and talks by a Canadian composer, 1961–1994, Golden Dog Press, ISBN 978-0-919614-72-7
- Blair, Jennifer; (2005) ReCalling Early Canada: Reading the Political in Literary and Cultural Production. U. of Alberta Press
- Clarke, George Elliott. Odysseys Home: Mapping African-Canadian Literature. U. of Toronto Press, 2002. 491 pp.
- Edwardson, Ryan (2009), Canuck rock: a history of Canadian popular music, University of Toronto Press, ISBN 978-0-8020-9989-1
- Michael Barclay; Ian Andrew Dylan Jack; Jason Schneider (1 June 2011). Have Not Been the Same: The CanRock Renaissance, 1985–1995. Toronto ON: ECW Press. ISBN 9781554909681. 2001 ed. ISBN 1-55022-475-1; 2010 ed. ISBN 978-1-55022-992-9.
- Druick, Zoë. Aspa Kotsopoulos (2008)Programming reality: perspectives on English-Canadian television, Wilfrid Laurier University Press ISBN 9781554580101
- Feldman, Seth and Nelson, Joyce, ed. Canadian Film Reader. Toronto: Martin, 1977. 405 pp.
- Francis, Daniel. The Imaginary Indian: The Image of the Indian in Canadian Culture. Vancouver: Arsenal Pulp, 1992. 260 pp.
- Hammill, Faye. Literary Culture and Female Authorship in Canada 1760–2000. Amsterdam: Rodopi, 2003. 245 pp.
- Keith, W. J. Canadian Literature in English. London: Longman, 1985. 287 pp.
- Kesterton, W.H. A History of Journalism in Canada (1979)
- Luc Lacoursière; Margaret Low (2025). Jean-Pierre Pichette; Bertrand Bergeron (eds.). Le Catalogue raisonné du conte populaire français en Amérique du Nord (Canada et États-Unis): Les contes d'animaux. Presses de l'Université Laval. ISBN 9782766308224.
- Lerner, Loren R. and Williamson, Mary F., eds. Art and Architecture in Canada: A Bibliography and Guide to the Literature = Art et Architecture au Canada: Bibliographie et Guide de la Documentation U. of Toronto Press, 1991. 998 pp.
- MacDonald, Mary Lu. Literature and Society in the Canadas, 1817–1850. Mellen, 1992. 360 pp.
- Marshall, Bill, ed. France and the Americas: Culture, Politics, and History (3 Vol 2005)
- Melnyk, George. One Hundred Years of Canadian Cinema. U. of Toronto Press, 2004. 361 pp.
- Morris, Peter (1978). Embattled shadows: a history of Canadian cinema, 1895–1939, McGill-Queen's University Press, ISBN 0-7735-0322-6
- New, W. H., ed. Literary History of Canada: Canadian Literature in English. (1990). 492 pp.
- Ord, Douglas. The National Gallery of Canada: Ideas, Art, Architecture. (2003). 500 pp.
- Perron, Paul. Narratology and Text: Subjectivity and Identity in New France and Québécois Literature. (2003). 338 pp.
- Simpson-Housley, Paul and Norcliffe, Glen, ed. Few Acres of Snow: Literary and Artistic Images of Canada. (1992). 277 pp.
- Stich, K. P., ed. Reflections: Autobiography and Canadian Literature. (1988). 176 pp.
- Smith, Judith E. Visions of Belonging: Family Stories, Popular Culture, and Postwar Democracy, 1940–1960. (2004). 444 pp.
- Thom, Ian, and Alan Elder. A Modern Life: Art and Design in British Columbia 1945–1960 (2004)
- Toye, William, ed. The Oxford Companion to Canadian Literature. (1983). 843 pp.
- Weiss, Jonathan, and Jane Moss. French-Canadian Literature (1996)
- Wise, Wyndham, ed. Essential guide to Canadian film. 2001

=== Education ===
- Axelrod, Paul. The Promise of Schooling: Education in Canada, 1800–1914 (1997)
- Bruno-Jofré, Rosa. "History of education in Canada: historiographic 'turns' and widening horizons." Paedagogica Historica (2014), 50#6, pp 774–785
- Burke, Sara Z., and Patrice Milewski, eds. Schooling in Transition: Readings in Canadian History of Education (2012) 24 articles by experts
- Clark, Lovell. ed The Manitoba School Question: majority rule or minority rights? (1968) historians debate the battle over French language schools
- Di Mascio, Anthony. The Idea of Popular Schooling in Upper Canada: Print Culture, Public Discourse, and the Demand for Education (McGill-Queen's University Press; 2012) 248 pages; building a common system of schooling in the late-18th and early 19th centuries.
- Gidney, R.D. and W.P.J. Millar. How Schools Worked: Public Education in English Canada, 1900–1940 (2011) 552pp; additional details
- Harris, Robin S. A history of higher education in Canada, 1663–1960 (1976) in ERIC
- Shook, Laurence K. Catholic Post-Secondary Education in English-Speaking Canada: A History (University of Toronto Press, 1971).

=== Sports ===
- Barclay, James A. Golf in Canada: A History (1992)
- Bouchier, Nancy. For the love of the game: Amateur sport in small-town Ontario, 1838–1895 (2003)
- Boyd, Bill. All Roads Lead to Hockey: Reports from Northern Canada to the Mexican Border. (2006). 240 pp
- Brown, D., 'The Northern Character Theme and Sport in Nineteenth Century Canada', Canadian Journal of History of Sport, 1989, 20(1), 47–56.
- Burstyn, V. The Rites of Men: Manhood, Politics, and The Culture of Sport. (1999).
- Charters, David A. The Chequered Past: Sports Car Racing and Rallying in Canada, 1951 - 1991 (2007) excerpt and text search
- Coakley, Jay and Peter Donnelly, Sports in Society: Issues and Controversies, (2003), 576pp
- Dauphinais, Paul R., 'A Class Act: French-Canadians in Organized Sport, 1840–1910', International Journal of the History of Sport, 1992 7(3): 432–442.
- Harper, Stephen (2013), A Great Game: The Forgotten Leafs and the Rise of Professional Hockey, Simon & Schuster Canada, ISBN 978-1-4767-1653-4
- Howell, Colin D. Blood, Sweat, and Cheers: Sport and the Making of Modern Canada (2001).
- Morrow, Don, and Kevin Wamsley. Sport in Canada: A History. (2nd ed. 2009) 392 pp.
- Robidoux, Michael A. (2002) "Imagining a Canadian Identity Through Sport: A Historical Interpretation of Lacrosse and Hockey," Journal of American Folklore, 115/456
- Podnieks, Andrew (2006), A Canadian Saturday Night: Hockey and the Culture of a Country, Greystone Books, ISBN 978-1-55365-201-4
- Zawadzki, Edward (2004), The Ultimate Canadian Sports Trivia Book, Volume 2, Dundurn Group, ISBN 978-1-55002-529-3

== Social ==
- Friedland, Martin L. University of Toronto: A History. (2002). 777pp ISBN 978-0-8020-4429-7
- Humphries, Mark Osborne. The Last Plague: Spanish Influenza and the Politics of Public Health in Canada (University of Toronto Press; 2013) examines the public-policy impact of the 1918 epidemic, which killed 50,000 Canadians.

=== Ethnicity and immigration ===
- Akenson, Donald H. The Irish in Ontario: A Study in Rural History (McGill-Queen's University Press, 1984)
- Bloemraad, Irene. Becoming a Citizen: Incorporating Immigrants and Refugees in the United States and Canada (2006)
- Campey, Lucille H. Ignored But Not Forgotten: Canada's English Immigrants (Dundurn, 2014)
- Campey, Lucille H (2008), An Unstoppable Force: The Scottish Exodus to Canada, Dundurn Group, ISBN 9781550028119
- Campey, Lucille H. After the Hector: The Scottish Pioneers of Nova Scotia and Cape Breton, 1773–1852 (Dundurn, 2007)
- Campey, Lucille H. Les Écossais: The Pioneer Scots of Lower Canada, 1763–1855 (Dundurn, 2006)
- Campey, Lucille H. With Axe and Bible: The Scottish Pioneers of New Brunswick, 1784–1874 (Dundurn, 2007)
- Campey, Lucille H. Planters, Paupers, and Pioneers: English Settlers in Atlantic Canada (2010)
- Campey, Lucille H. Seeking a Better Future: The English Pioneers of Ontario and Quebec (2012)
- Grekul, Lisa. Leaving Shadows: Literature in English by Canada's Ukrainians (2005)
- Grenke, Arthur. The German Community in Winnipeg 1872 to 1919 (1991)
- Harney, Nicholas De Maria (1998), Eh, paesan!: being Italian in Toronto, U of Toronto Press, ISBN 978-0-8020-4259-0
- Hoerder, Dirk. Creating Societies: Immigrant Lives in Canada. (2000) 416 pp.
- Iacovetta, Franca, Paula Draper, and Robert A. Ventresca. A Nation of Immigrants: Readings in Canadian History, 1840s–1960s (1998)
- Kelley, Ninette, and Michael J. Trebilcock. The Making of the Mosaic: A History of Canadian Immigration Policy (1998)
- Kukushkin, Vadim. From Peasants to Labourers: Ukrainian and Belarusan Immigration from the Russian Empire to Canada (2007)
- McDougall, Duncan M. "Immigration into Canada, 1851–1920," The Canadian Journal of Economics and Political Science, Vol. 27, No. 2 (May, 1961), pp. 162–175 in JSTOR
- McKay, Ian. "Tartanism Triumphant. The Construction of Scottishness in Nova Scotia, 1933–1954." Acadiensis 21, no. 2 (Spring 1992): 5-47.
- Magocsi, Paul R. ed. Encyclopedia of Canadas Peoples (1999), detailed guides to all groups
- Makabe, Tomoko. The Canadian Sansei (1998), 3rd generation of Japanese descent
- Messamore, Barbara, ed. Canadian Migration Patterns from Britain and North America (2004) 300pp; essays by scholars
- Petryshyn, Jaroslav. Peasants in the Promised Land: Canada and the Ukrainians (1985)
- Pivato, Joseph. The Anthology Of Italian-Canadian Writing (1998)
- Poy, Vivienne, ed. Passage to Promise Land: Voices of Chinese Immigrant Women to Canada (2013) ISBN 9780773541498 Table of Contents
- Ramirez, Bruno. On the move: French-Canadian and Italian migrants in the North Atlantic economy 1860–1914 (1991). French-Canadians moving to New England & Italians to Montreal
- Riedel, Walter. The Old world and the new: Literary perspectives of German-speaking Canadians (1984)
- Roy, Patricia. A White Man's Province: British Columbia Politicians and Chinese and Japanese Immigrants, 1858–1914 (1989)
- Schryer, Frans J. The Netherlandic Presence in Ontario: Pillars, Class and Dutch Ethnicity. (1998). 458 pp. focus is post WW2
- Swyripa, Frances. Storied Landscapes: Ethno-Religious Identity and the Canadian Prairies (University of Manitoba Press, 2010) 296 pp. ISBN 978-0-88755-720-0
- Teixeira, Carlos; Victor M. P. Da Rosa (2009), The Portuguese in Canada: diasporic challenges and adjustment, University of Toronto Press, ISBN 978-0-8020-9833-7
- Wagner, Jonathan. A History Of Migration From Germany to Canada, 1850–1939 (2005)

=== Religion ===
- Beaman, Lori G. (2006), Religion and Canadian society: traditions, transitions, and innovations, Cambridge Scholars Publishing, ISBN 978-1-55130-306-2
- Beaman, Lori G.; Peter Beyer (2008), Religion and diversity in Canada, Leiden Brill, ISBN 9789004170155
- Bean, Lydia, Marco Gonzalez, and Jason Kaufman. "Why doesn't Canada have an American-style Christian right? A comparative framework for analyzing the political effects of evangelical subcultural identity." Canadian Journal of Sociology/Cahiers canadiens de sociologie 33.4 (2008): 899–943. online
- Bramadat, Paul; David Seljak (2009), Religion and Ethnicity in Canada, University of Toronto Press, ISBN 9781442610187
- Bramadat, Paul; Seljak, David (2008). Christianity and ethnicity in Canada. University of Toronto Press. ISBN 9780802098757.
- Carrington, Philip. The Anglican Church in Canada: A History (Collins, 1963)
- Christie, Nancy, and Michael Gauvreau. Christian Churches and Their Peoples, 1840–1965: A Social History of Religion in Canada (2010), 176pp excerpt and text search
- Clark, Samuel Delbert. Church and sect in Canada (U of Toronto Press, 1948.
- Clifford, N. Keith. The Resistance to Church Union in Canada, 1904–1939 (U of British Columbia Press, 1985)
- Emery, George. Methodist Church on the Prairies, 1896–1914 (McGill-Queen's Press-MQUP, 2001)
- Fay, Terence J. A History of Canadian Catholics: Gallicanism, Romanism, and Canadianism (2002) excerpt and text search
- Fraser, Brian J. The Social Uplifters: Presbyterian Progressives and the Social Gospel in Canada 1875–1915 (Wilfrid Laurier Univ. Press, 1988)
- Gardaz, Michel. "Religious studies in Francophone Canada." Religion 41#1 (2011): 53–70.
- Gidney, Catherine. Long Eclipse: The Liberal Protestant Establishment and the Canadian University, 1920–1970 (McGill-Queen's Press-MQUP, 2004)
- Grant, John Webster, et al. The Church in the French Era; The Church in the British Era; The Church in the Canadian Era (3 vol. 1972; 1988); general history of Catholicism and Protestantism in Canada
- Grant, John Webster. Moon of Wintertime: Missionaries and the Indians of Canada in Encounter since 1534 (U of Toronto Press, 1984)
- Healey, Robynne Rogers. From Quaker to Upper Canadian: Faith and Community Among Yonge Street Friends, 1801–1850 (McGill-Queen's Press-MQUP, 2006)
- Lahey, Raymond J. The First Thousand Years: A Brief History of the Catholic Church in Canada (2002)
- McGowan, Mark. Michael Power: The Struggle to Build the Catholic Church on the Canadian Frontier (McGill-Queen's Press-MQUP, 2005)
- Marshall, David. Secularizing the Faith: Canadian Protestant Clergy and the Crisis of Belief, 1850–1940 (1992)
- Miedema, Gary. For Canada's sake: Public religion, centennial celebrations, and the re-making of Canada in the 1960s (McGill-Queen's Press-MQUP, 2005)
- Moir, John S. Enduring witness: a history of the Presbyterian Church in Canada (3rd ed. Presbyterian Church in Canada, 1987)
- Moir, John S. Church and State in Canada, 1627–1867; Basic Documents (McClelland and Stewart, 1967), Primary sources
- Mol, Hans (1989). "The secularization of Canada". Research in the Social Scientific Study of Religion. 1: 197–215.
- Morice, A G. History of the Catholic Church in Western Canada: From Lake Superior to the Pacific (1659–1895) (1910) online
- Murphy, Terrence, and Gerald Stortz, eds, Creed and Culture: The Place of English-Speaking Catholics in Canadian Society, 1750 – 1930 (1993), articles by scholars
- Murphy, Terrence, and Roberto Perin, eds. A Concise History of Christianity in Canada (1996).
- Noll, Mark A. (1992). A History of Christianity in the United States and Canada. ISBN 9780802806512., A wide-ranging general survey.
- Opp, James William. The Lord for the Body: Religion, Medicine, and Protestant Faith Healing in Canada, 1880–1930 (McGill-Queen's Press-MQUP, 2005)
- Perin, Roberto. Rome in Canada: the Vatican and Canadian affairs in the late Victorian age (U of Toronto Press, 1990)
- Semple, Neil. Lord's Dominion: The History of Canadian Methodism (McGill-Queen's Press-MQUP, 1996)
- Webster, Thomas. History of the Methodist Episcopal Church in Canada (1870) online
- Wilson, Robert S. "Patterns of Canadian Baptist Life in the Twentieth Century," Baptist History & Heritage (2001) 36# 1/2, pp 27–60. Covers the educational, social, political, missionary, and theological trends; notes that the years 1953–2000 were marked by the union of different Baptist groups.

== Women, gender, family ==
- Bradbury, Bettina (2007) [1993]. "Age, Gender, and Daily Survival in Industrializing Montreal". Working Families: Age, Gender, and Daily Survival in Industrializing Montreal. University of Toronto Press. doi:10.3138/9781442685475. ISBN 978-1-4426-9095-0. JSTOR 10.3138/9781442685475.
- Bullen, John (May 1985). "Orphans, Idiots, Lunatics, and Historians: Recent Approaches to the History of Child Welfare in Canada". Histoire Sociale: Social History. 18 (35): 133–45. PMID 11618128.
- Campbell, Lara; Perry, Adele; Myers, Tamara (2016). Rethinking Canada: The Promise of Women's History (7th ed.). Oxford University Press. ISBN 978-0-19-901108-7.
- Cohen, Marjorie Griffin (1988). Women's Work, Markets and Economic Development in Nineteenth-Century Ontario. University of Toronto Press. ISBN 978-1-4426-5800-4. JSTOR 10.3138/j.ctt1287zrc.
- Driver, Elizabeth (2008). "A Bibliography of Canadian Cookbooks, 1825–1949". Culinary Landmarks: A Bibliography of Canadian Cookbooks, 1825–1949. University of Toronto Press. ISBN 978-0-8020-4790-8. JSTOR 10.3138/j.ctt2ttnq9.
- Forster, Merna (2004). 100 Canadian Heroines: Famous and Forgotten Faces. Dundurn. ISBN 978-1-55002-514-9.
- Frager, Ruth A.; Patrias, Carmela (2005). Discounted Labour: Women Workers in Canada, 1870–1939. University of Toronto Press. ISBN 978-0-8020-7818-6. JSTOR 10.3138/j.ctt1287st0.
- Gleason, Mona; Perry, Adele; Myers, Tamara (2011). Rethinking Canada: The Promise of Women's History (6th ed.). Oxford University Press. ISBN 978-0-19-543172-8.
- Hall, Margaret Ann (2002). "A History of Women's Sport in Canada". The Girl and the Game: A History of Women's Sport in Canada. University of Toronto Press. ISBN 978-1-55111-268-8. JSTOR 10.3138/j.ctt2ttfvj.
- Halpern, Monda M. (2001). And on that Farm He Had a Wife: Ontario Farm Women and Feminism, 1900–1970. McGill-Queen's University Press. ISBN 978-0-7735-2185-8.
- Hammill, Faye (2003). Literary Culture and Female Authorship in Canada 1760–2000. Rodopi. ISBN 978-90-420-0915-8.
- Kelsey, Marion (1997). "Diary of a Canadian in the Women's Land Army, 1940–1944". Victory Harvest: Diary of a Canadian in the Women's Land Army, 1940–1944. McGill-Queen's University Press. ISBN 978-0-7735-1663-2. JSTOR j.ctt8111x.
- Kechnie, Margaret (2003). "The Federated Women's Institutes of Ontario, 1897–1919". Organizing Rural Women: The Federated Women's Institutes of Ontario, 1897–1919. McGill-Queen's University Press. ISBN 978-0-7735-2604-4. JSTOR j.ctt7zwfj.
- McPherson, Kathryn; Morgan, Cecilia; Forestell, Nancy M., eds. (2003) [1999]. Gendered Pasts: Historical Essays in Femininity and Masculinity in Canada. University of Toronto Press. ISBN 978-0-8020-8690-7. JSTOR j.ctt1287pv2.
- Moss, Mark (2001). "Educating Young Boys in Ontario for War". Manliness and Militarism: Educating Young Boys in Ontario for War. University of Toronto Press. ISBN 978-0-19-541594-0. JSTOR 10.3138/j.ctt1287t3m.
- Noël, Françoise (2003). "A View from Diaries and Family Correspondence". Family Life and Sociability in Upper and Lower Canada, 1780–1870: A View from Diaries and Family Correspondence. McGill-Queen's University Press. ISBN 978-0-7735-2445-3. JSTOR j.ctt816fc.
- Noël, Françoise (2009). Family and Community Life in Northeastern Ontario: The Interwar Years. McGill-Queen's University Press. ISBN 978-0-7735-7614-8.
- Parr, Joy, ed. (1995). A Diversity of Women: Ontario, 1945–1980. University of Toronto Press. ISBN 978-0-8020-7695-3.
- Prentice, Alison, ed. (1996). Canadian Women: A History (2nd ed.). Harcourt Brace Canada. ISBN 978-0-7747-3293-2.
- Rains, Olga; Rains, Lloyd; Jarratt, Melynda (2006). Voices of the Left Behind: Project Roots and the Canadian War Children of World War II. Dundurn. ISBN 978-1-55002-585-9.
- Smith, Judith E. (2004). "Family Stories, Popular Culture, and Postwar Democracy, 1940–1960". Visions of Belonging: Family Stories, Popular Culture, and Postwar Democracy, 1940–1960. Columbia University Press. doi:10.7312/smit12170. ISBN 978-0-231-12170-5. JSTOR 10.7312/smit12170.
- Strong-Boag, Veronica Jane; Fellman, Anita Clair (1997). Rethinking Canada: The Promise of Women's History (3rd ed.). Oxford University Press. ISBN 978-0-19-541291-8.
- Strong-Boag, Veronica Jane; Gleason, Mona Lee; Perry, Adele (2006). Rethinking Canada: The Promise of Women's History (5th ed.). Oxford University Press. ISBN 978-0-19-542350-1.
- Wine, Jeri Dawn; Ristock, Janice L. (1991). Women and Social Change: Feminist Activism in Canada. James Lorimer & Company. ISBN 978-1-55028-356-3.

== Historiography and guides to the scholarly literature ==
- Artibise, Alan F.J., ed. (1990). Interdisciplinary Approaches to Canadian Society: A Guide to the Literature. McGill-Queen's University Press. ISBN 978-0-7735-0788-3.
- Berger, Carl. Writing Canadian History: Aspects of English Canadian Historical Writing since 1900 (2nd ed. 1986), 364pp evaluates the work of most of the leading 20th century historians of Canada.
- Berger, Carl, ed. Contemporary Approaches to Canadian Writing (1987)
- Bliss, Michael (Winter 1991). "Privatizing the Mind: The Sundering of Canadian History, the Sundering of Canada". Journal of Canadian Studies. 26 (4): 5–17. doi:10.3138/jcs.26.4.5. S2CID 151721939.
- Brandt, Gail Cuthbert (1992). "National Unity and the Politics of Political History". Journal of the Canadian Historical Association. 3 (1): 3–11. doi:10.7202/031041ar.
- Buckner, Phillip and John G. Reid, eds. Remembering 1759: The Conquest of Canada in Historical Memory (U of Toronto Press, 2012)
- Careless, J. M. S. "Canadian Nationalism — Immature or Obsolete?" Report of the Annual Meeting of the Canadian Historical Association / Rapports annuels de la Société historique du Canada (1954) 33#1 pp: 12–19. online
- Dick, Lyle (June 2001). "A Growing Necessity for Canada: W. L. Morton's Centenary Series and the Forms of National History, 1955-80". The Canadian Historical Review. 82 (2): 223–252. doi:10.3138/CHR.82.2.223. S2CID 162319085.
- Edwards, Justin D.l and Douglas Ivison. Downtown Canada: Writing Canadian Cities (2005)
- Fulford, Robert, David Godfrey, and Abraham Rotstein. Read Canadian: a book about Canadian books (1972) 275pp; topical chapters that comment on the best historical and current studies
- Gagnon, Serge. Quebec and its Historians: 1840 to 1920 (English ed. 1982; French ed. 1978)
- Gagnon, Serge. Quebec and its Historians: The Twentieth Century (English ed. 1985)
- Glassford, Larry A. "The Evolution of 'New Political History' in English-Canadian Historiography: From Cliometrics to Cliodiversity." American Review of Canadian Studies. 32#3 (2002).
- Granatstein, J. L. (1998). Who Killed Canadian History?. HarperCollins. ISBN 0-00-255759-2.
- Granatstein, J. L. and Paul Stevens, eds. A Reader's Guide to Canadian History: Confederation to the Present (1982)
- Granatstein and Stevens, eds. A Reader's Guide to Canadian History: Confederation to the Present v2 (1982)
- Greer, Allan (December 2010). "National, Transnational, and Hypernational Historiographies: New France Meets Early American History". Canadian Historical Review. 91 (4): 695–724. doi:10.3138/chr.91.4.695.
- Hulan, Renée (2014). Canadian Historical Writing: Reading the Remains. Palgrave Macmillan. ISBN 978-1-137-39888-8.
- Kealey, Gregory S. (Summer 1992). "Class in English-Canadian Historical Writing: Neither Privatizing, Nor Sundering". Journal of Canadian Studies. 27 (2): 123–129. doi:10.3138/jcs.27.2.123. ISSN 0021-9495. S2CID 151974372.
- Kealey, Linda; Pierson, Ruth; Sangster, Joan; Strong-Boag, Veronica (Summer 1992). "Teaching Canadian History in the 1990s: Whose 'National' History Are We Lamenting?". Journal of Canadian Studies. 27 (2): 129–131. doi:10.3138/jcs.27.2.129. ISSN 0021-9495. S2CID 151496673.
- Muise, D. A. ed., A Reader's Guide to Canadian History: i, Beginnings to Confederation (1982); historiography
- Osborne, Ken (September 2000). "'Our History Syllabus Has Us Gasping': History in Canadian Schools--Past, Present, and Future". The Canadian Historical Review. 81 (3): 403–471. doi:10.3138/chr.81.3.403. S2CID 162588531.
- Parr, Joy (September 1995). "Gender History and Historical Practice". The Canadian Historical Review. 76 (3): 354–376. doi:10.3138/CHR-076-03-03. S2CID 162448329.
- Taylor, M. Brook, ed. Canadian History: A Reader's Guide. Vol. 1. Doug Owram, ed. Canadian History: A Reader's Guide. Vol. 2. Toronto: 1994. historiography
- Rudin, Ronald. Making History in Twentieth Century Quebec (1997)
- Schultz, John. ed. Writing About Canada: A Handbook for Modern Canadian History (1990), chapters by experts on politics, economics, ideas, regions, agriculture, business, labor, women, ethnicity and war.
- Strong-Boag, Veronica, Mona Gleason, and Adele Perry. Rethinking Canada: The Promise of Women's History (2003)
- Strong-Boag, Veronica (1994). "Contested Space: The Politics of Canadian Memory". Journal of the Canadian Historical Association. 5 (1): 3–17. doi:10.7202/031070ar.
- Warkentin, John, ed. So Vast and Various: Interpreting Canada's Regions in the Nineteenth and Twentieth Centuries (2010); looks at 150 years of writings about Canada's regions.
- Wright, Donald. The Professionalization of History in English Canada (2005) 280pp
- Wyile, Herb (2007). Speaking in the Past Tense: Canadian Novelists on Writing Historical Fiction. Wilfrid Laurier University Press. ISBN 978-0-88920-511-6.

== Primary sources ==
- Canadian Studies: A Guide to the Sources
- The CanText text library contains a library of documents divided by time period.
- Canada: Literature and History 347 e-books
- Blackwell, John D. "Canadian Studies: A Core Collection," CHOICE: Current Reviews for Academic Libraries 35 (September 1997): 71-84,
- Browne, G. P., ed. Documents on the Confederation of British North America (1969).
- Kennedy, W.P.M., ed. (1918). Documents of the Canadian Constitution, 1759–1915. Oxford UP.; 707pp
- Morris, Alexander. 1880. The Treaties of Canada with the Indians of Manitoba and the North-West Territories: including the negotiations on which they were based, and other information relating thereto. Belfords, Clarke, and Co. Reprint: Prospero Books, Toronto, 2000.
- Pickersgill, J.W., and Donald F. Forster, The Mackenzie King Record. 4 vols. Vol. 1: 1939–1944 and Vol. 2: 1944–1945 (University of Toronto Press, 1960); and Vol. 3: 1945–1946 and Vol. 4: 1946–1947(University of Toronto Press, 1970). from King's diary
- Reid, J. H. Stewart; Kenneth McNaught; Harry S. Crowe, eds. (1964). A Source-book of Canadian History: Selected Documents and Personal Papers. Longmans Canada. Archived from the original on 2007-11-02 – via Questia.485pp; short excerpts from primary sources covering 200 major topics
- Riddell, Walter A. ed; Documents on Canadian Foreign Policy, 1917–1939 (Oxford University Press, 1962) 806pp
- Talman, James J. ed; Basic Documents in Canadian History (1959)
- Thorner, Thomas, and Thor Frohn-Nielsen, eds. "A Few Acres of Snow": Documents in Pre-Confederation Canadian History, and "A Country Nourished on Self-Doubt": Documents on Post-Confederation Canadian History (3rd ed. (2010).

=== Historical statistics ===
- Statistics Canada. Historical Statistics of Canada. 2d ed., Ottawa: Statistics Canada, 1983.
- Canada Year Book (CYB) annual 1867–1967
- Cantril, Hadley and Mildred Strunk, eds. Public Opinion, 1935–1946 (1951), massive compilation of many public opinion polls from Canada and USA
- Statistics Canada (October 27, 2010). Canada Year Book. Ottawa: Federal Publications (Queen of Canada). Catalogue no 11-402-XPE.

== See also ==
- Historiography of Canada
- Bibliography of Canada
  - Outline of Canada#Bibliographies
- Bibliography of Canadian military history
  - List of books about the War of 1812
- Bibliography of Canadian provinces and territories
- Bibliography of science and technology in Canada
- Bibliography of Nova Scotia
- Bibliography of Saskatchewan history
- Bibliography of Alberta history
- Bibliography of British Columbia
- Bibliography of the 1837-1838 insurrections in Lower Canada
- Lists of books
- List of bibliographies
- List of books about prime ministers of Canada
