= Thomas Marquis =

Thomas Marquis may refer to:

- Thomas Bailey Marquis (1869–1935), American author, historian, and physician
- Thomas Guthrie Marquis (1864–1936), Canadian author
