= Agnes C. Laut =

Canadian journalist, novelist, historian, and social worker

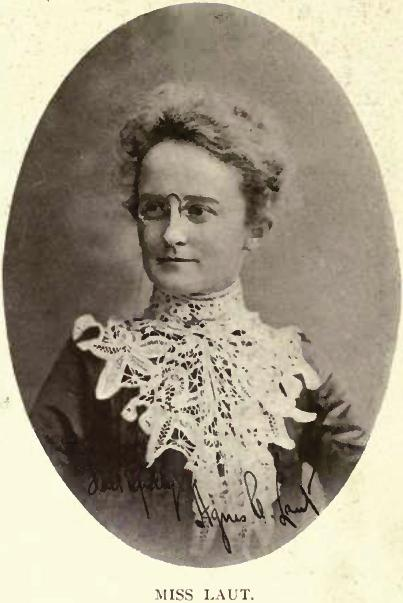
- Born: Agnes Christina Laut; 11 February 1871; Stanley Township, Huron County, Ontario, Canada
- Died: 15 November 1936 (aged 65); Wassaic, New York, US
- Resting place: Wassaic, New York, USA
- Parent(s): John Laut; Eliza (George) Laut

Agnes Christina Laut (11 February 1871 – 15 November 1936) was a Canadian journalist, novelist, historian, and social worker.

== Biography ==
Laut was born in Stanley Township, Huron County, Ontario, to John Laut and his wife, Eliza George Laut.

In 1873, the family moved to the then-frontier town of Winnipeg, Manitoba, where Agnes finished normal school when she was fifteen. She worked as a substitute teacher at the Carleton School in Winnipeg for several years, then enrolled at the University of Manitoba. However, she was forced to drop out after two years due to health problems. She then turned to writing, and was soon published in the New York Evening Press, and the Manitoba Free Press. She also worked as an editorial writer at the Manitoba Free Press from 1895 to 1897, after which she took two years off to travel the continent from Atlantic to Pacific, paying her way with articles contributed to periodicals. In 1900 she emigrated to the United States, taking residence in Wassaic, New York in 1901.

Her first novel, Lords of the North, was published in 1900. After performing research for this and possible follow-on writings, Laut noted the paucity of information covering Canadian history. She decided to address this need by performing research using direct sources then writing on historical subjects.

Between 1900 and 1931, she wrote two dozen books, mainly the topics of the evolution of Canadian territory, the history of Montana, and settlers traveling the Santa Fe Trail. Her novels quickly became popular.

Despite moving to America, Laut remained a Canadian nationalist and wrote works intended to teach Americans more about her home country: Canada, the Empire of the North; The Canadian Commonwealth (1909); and Canada at the Cross Roads. Her writing proved popular and she became "one of the best-known and prolific historians of her time".

In 1919, she served as secretary for the Childhood Conservation League, a philanthropic organization intended to help children left homeless following the Mexican Revolution. After traveling to Mexico as a representative of the league, she testified before the United States Senate Committee on Foreign Relations concerning conditions in Mexico.

Laut never married. She died in 1936, and was buried in Wassaic.

== Bibliography ==
- Canada's claims before the Anglo-American Joint high commission (1899)
- Lords of the North: A romance of the North-West (1900)
- Pathfinders of the West: Being the Thrilling Story of the Adventures of the Men Who Discovered the Great Northwest: Radisson, La Verendrye, Lewis and Clark (1902)
- The Story of the Trapper (1902)
- Heralds of empire; being the story of one Ramsay Stanhope, lieutenant to Pierre Radisson in the northern fur trade (1902)
- Vikings of the Pacific: The Adventures of the Explorers who Came from the West, Eastward (1905)
- The Conquest of the Great Northwest: Being the Story of the Adventurers of England Known as the Hudson's Bay Company (1908)
- Canada, the Empire of the North: Being the Romantic Story of the New Dominion's Growth from Colony to Kingdom (1909)
- The Freebooters of the Wilderness (1910)
- The New Dawn (1913)
- Through Our Unknown Southwest: The Wonderland of the United States (1913)
- The "Adventurers of England" on Hudson Bay: A Chronicle of the Fur Trade in the North (1914)
- The Canadian Commonwealth (1915)
- Pioneers of the Pacific Coast: A Chronicle of Sea Rovers and Fur Hunters (1915)
- The Cariboo Trail: A Chronicle of the Gold-Fields of British Columbia (1916)
- Mexico, the Unsolved Problem (1919)
- Canada at the Cross Roads (1921)
- The Fur Trade of America (1921)
- The Quenchless Light (1924)
- The Blazed Trail of the Old Frontier. Being the Log of the Upper Missouri Historical Expedition (1926)
- Enchanted Trails of Glacier Park (1926)
- The Conquest of Our Western Empire (1927)
- The Romance of the Rails: The Story of the American Railroads (1929)
- The Overland Trail: The Epic Path of the Pioneers to Oregon (1929)
- Antoine de la Mothe Cadillac, 1657-1730 (1930)
- John Tanner: Captive Boy Wanderer of the Border Lands (1930)
- Marquette (1930)
- Cadillac: Knight Errant of the Wilderness, Founder of Detroit, Governor of Louisiana from the Great Lakes to the Gulf (1931)
- Pilgrims of the Santa Fe (1931)
