= H. Blair Neatby =

Canadian historian (1924–2018)

Herbert Blair Neatby FRSC (1924–2018) was a Canadian historian.

Born on 11 December 1924 in Renown, Saskatchewan, he graduated from the University of Saskatchewan in 1950 and pursued graduate study at the University of Oxford and the University of Toronto. Neatby began teaching at Carleton University in 1964, received a Guggenheim fellowship in 1967 and was named a fellow of the Royal Society of Canada in 1977.

A history of Carleton University was published by H.B. Neatby in 2002: Creating Carleton: The Shaping of a University, McGill-Queen's Press.

He died on 11 March 2018 at the Ottawa Civic Hospital.
