= Saskatchewan History =

History periodical

Saskatchewan History was a magazine dedicated to exploring the history of the province of Saskatchewan. First released in 1948 by the Saskatchewan Archives Board, the magazine published both scholarly and light-reading articles. Topics of the magazine have included: ethnicity and race, Métis and First Nations history, immigration, businesses and organizations, history of the fur trade, women's history and events that have shaped Saskatchewan's past. Contributors to the magazine have included many prominent prairie and social historians.

The magazine used to be published twice a year, in spring and fall. Publication ended in 2017.
