= Weigl Educational Publishers Limited =

Canadian educational publishing house

- Founded: 1979
- Founder: Linda A. Weigl
- Country of origin: Canada
- Headquarters location: Calgary
- Publication types: Books, Digital Products, eBooks
- Official website: http://www.weigl.ca/

Weigl Educational Publishers Limited is a publishing house in Canada, one of the country's largest.

Linda A. Weigl founded the company in 1979 as a textbook publisher. First based in Saskatchewan, the company moved to Alberta in 1984, and now has its headquarters in Calgary with a warehouse in Ontario. In the 1980s, Weigl Educational Publishers Limited produced multimedia social studies kits for Alberta Education. The kits supported Alberta's new social studies program and were distributed to all Elementary and Secondary schools in the province. Known as Kanata Kits, they included many different educational materials, including teacher guides, student booklets, audiovisual resources, picture sets, and manipulative items.

At the same time, the company published Canada’s Political Heritage, a Canadian history textbook for grade 8 which was a major commercial success, selling more than 70,000 copies between 1985 and 1990.

The company's main focus is now the K–12 school library market. With the production of non-fiction reference titles in English and French, Weigl Educational Publishers Limited established a national presence. The company is also known for its titles about Indigenous Peoples, covering historical, cultural, and contemporary subjects about First Nations, Inuit, and Métis. The catalogue of Weigl Educational Publishers Limited counts more than 1,940 titles. For its role in the Canadian book industry, Weigl Educational Publishers Limited has been the recipient of Canadian grants, support, and funding, including from the Book Publishing Industry Development Program in 2006 and the Canada Book Fund in 2011.

== Awards ==
In 2010, Weigl Educational Publishers Limited won the Alberta Book Publishing Award for Educational Book of the Year with the series Canadian Citizenship in Action. The series included four titles, Protecting Rights in Canada, Resolving Political Differences, Citizens and the Political Process, and Citizen Rights and Responsibilities.

The company was shortlisted for the Alberta Book Publishing Awards for Children and Young Adult titles in 2018, with four titles from the Canada on the Battlefield series. The titles were The Battle of Passchendaele; The Battle of Vimy Ridge, The 2nd Battle of Ypres, and The Battle of the Somme.

In 2013, Linda A. Weigl was appointed as a member of the Alberta Council of Culture. The council was established to develop a long-term, province-wide culture plan and to identify approaches to promoting and supporting culture in Alberta.

In June 2018, Linda A. Weigl was honoured with the BMO Celebrating Women: Innovation and Global Growth award for her innovative approach to the editorial market.
