= Thomas Guthrie Marquis =

Canadian historian (1864–1936)

- Born: July 4, 1864; Chatham, New Brunswick
- Died: April 1, 1936 (aged 71); Toronto, Ontario
- Occupation: Historian
- Spouse(s): Mary Adelaide King (div=1905); Alice Selby
- Writing career
- Period: 20th century
- Genre: History

Thomas Guthrie Marquis (July 7, 1864–April 1, 1936) was a Canadian historian.

== Biography ==
Marquis was born in Chatham, New Brunswick. His parents were Hugh P. Marquis and Mary McIndoe. His father was employed in the shipbuilding industry. He attended school in Chatham but at age 16 he went to Queen's University, Kingston, where he graduated in 1889. He became a teacher, but he retired in 1901 to devote himself to literature. He worked briefly in Ottawa as an editorial writer with the Ottawa Free Press but went to Toronto where he worked as a freelance writer. He was office editor of Canada and Its Provinces (1914–1915), a publication in 22 volumes on the history of Canada.

== Works ==
- Stories Of New France, (1890) with Agnes Maule Machar
- Heroes Of Canada, (1893) with Machar
- Stories From Canadian History, (1893) with Machar
- Marguerite De Roberval: Days Of Jacques Cartier, (1899)
- Canada's Sons on Kopje and Veldt, (1900)
- Life of Lord Roberts, (1901)
- Presidents of the United States, (1903)
- Builders Of Canada (also titled: Giants Of The Dominion), (1903) [edited]
- Brock, The Hero Of Upper Canada, (1912)
- English-Canadian Literature, (1913)
- The War Chief Of The Ottawas, (1915)
- The Jesuit Missions: Chronicle Of The Cross In The Wilderness, (1916)
- The Cathedral, (1924)
- The King's Wish, (1924)
- Sir Isaac Brock, (1926)
- Naval Warfare on the Great Lakes, 1812-14, (1926)
- Battlefields of 1813, (1926)
- The Voyages Of Jacques Cartier, (1934) with Sherman Charles Swift
- The Cathedral And Other Poems, (1936)
- Stories From Canadian History, (1936)
