= CHA Best Scholarly Book in Canadian History Prize =

Book prize by the Canadian Historical Association

The CHA Best Scholarly Book in Canadian History Prize is an annual book prize awarded by the Canadian Historical Association. According to the CHA, the award is for the "non-fiction work of Canadian history judged to have made the most significant contribution to an understanding of the Canadian past." Recipients may be either English or French language works. First awarded in 1977, the prize was originally named for Canada's first Prime Minister, Sir John A. Macdonald. However, in 2017, the CHA council proposed changing the name of the award given Macdonald's contentious legacy, particularly in relation to Indigenous peoples. In May 2018, a significant majority of CHA members voted in favour of the change at the Association's annual meeting.

This prize is also part of the Governor General's Awards for excellence in scholarly research. It comes with a prize of $5,000 and is presented by Canada's Governor General at Rideau Hall.

== Recipients ==
Year	Winner	Title
1977	Fernand Ouellet	Le Bas-Canada 1791-1840: Changements structuraux et crise
1978	Robin A. Fisher	Contact and Conflict: Indian-European Relations in B.C. 1774-1890
1979	Richard J. Diubaldo	Stefansson and the Canadian Arctic
1980	Maria Tippett	Emily Carr: A Biography
1981	Gregory Kealey	Toronto Workers Respond to Industrial Capitalism 1867-1892
1982	Paul-André Linteau	Maisonneuve: Comment des promoteurs fabriquent une ville, 1883-1918
1983	Irving Abella and Harold Troper	None is too Many: Canada and the Jews of Europe, 1933-1948
1984	Marcel Trudel	Histoire de la Nouvelle-France, volume III, La Seigneurie des Cent-Associés, 1627-1663
1985	Gerald Friesen	The Canadian Prairies, A History
1986	Allan Greer	Peasant, Lord, and Merchant: Rural Society in Three Parishes, 1740-1840
1987	Christopher Armstrong and H. V. Nelles	Monopoly's Moment. The Organization and Regulation of Canadian Utilities, 1830-1930
1988	Cole Harris and G. J. Matthews (eds.)	From the Beginning to 1800, volume I of the Historical Atlas of Canada
1989	Veronica Strong-Boag	The New Day Recalled: Lives of Girls and Women in English Canada, 1919-1939
1990	John English	Shadow of Heaven: The Life of Lester Pearson, Vol. I; 1897-1948
1991	Joy Parr	The Gender of Breadwinners: Women, Men and Change in Two Industrial Towns, 1880-1950
1992	Julie Cruikshank	Life Lived Like a Story: Life Stories of Three Yukon Native Elders
1993	Olive Patricia Dickason	Canada's First Nations: A History of Founding Peoples from Earliest Times
1994	Bettina Bradbury	Working Families: Age, Gender and Daily Survival in Industrializing Montreal
1995	Harold Kalman	A History of Canadian Architecture, 2 Vols.
1996	Jan Noel	Temperance Crusades Before Confederation
1997	Gérard Bouchard	Quelques arpents d'Amérique
1998	Jonathan F. Vance	Death So Noble: Memory, Meaning, and the First World War
1999	Mary-Ellen Kelm	Colonizing Bodies: Aboriginal Health and Healing in British Columbia, 1900-1950
2000	H. V. Nelles	The Art of Nation-Building: Pageantry and Spectacle at Quebec's Tercentenary
2001	Nancy Christie	Engendering the State: Family, Work, and Welfare in Canada
2002	Bruce Curtis	The Politics of Population. State Formation, Statistics, and the Census of Canada, 1840-1875
2003	Cole Harris	Making Native Space. Colonialism, Resistance, and Reserves in British Columbia
2004	Jerry Bannister	The Rule of the Admirals: Law, Custom and Naval Government in Newfoundland, 1699-1832.
2005	Dominique Deslandres	Croire et faire croire. Les missions françaises au XVIIe siécle
2006	Michael Gauvreau	The Catholic Origins of Quebec’s Quiet Revolution, 1931-1970
2007	Tina Loo	States of Nature. Conserving Canada’s Wildlife in the Twentieth Century
2008	Franca Iacovetta	Gatekeepers: Reshaping Immigrant Lives in Cold War Canada
2009	Ian McKay	Reasoning Otherwise. Leftists and the People's Enlightenment in Canada, 1890-1920
2010	Béatrice Craig	Backwoods Consumers and Homespun Capitalists: The Rise of a Market Culture in Eastern Canada
2011	Michel Ducharme	Le concept de liberté au Canada à l’époque des Révolutions atlantiques (1776-1838)
2012	François-Marc Gagnon, with Nancy Senior and Réal Ouellet (eds.)	The Codex Canadensis and the Writings of Louis Nicolas
2013	William C. Wicken	The Colonization of Mi’kmaw Memory and History, 1794-1928: The King v. Gabriel Sylliboy
2014	James Daschuk	Clearing the Plains: Disease, Politics of Starvation, and the Loss of Aboriginal Life
2015	Jean Barman	French Canadians, Furs, and Indigenous Women in the Making of the Pacific Northwest
2016	Robert C. H. Sweeny	Why Did We Choose to Industrialize? Montreal, 1819-1849
2017	Sarah Carter	Imperial Plots: Women, Land, and the Spadework of British Colonialism on the Canadian Prairies
2018	E. A. Heaman	Tax, Order, and Good Government: A New Political History of Canada, 1867-1917
2019	Shirley Tillotson	Give and Take: The Citizen-Taxpayer and the Rise of Canadian Democracy
2020	Eric Reiter	Wounded Feelings: Litigating Emotions in Quebec, 1870-1950
2021	Brittany Luby	Dammed: The Politics of Loss and Survival in Anishinaabe Territory
2022	Benjamin Hoy	A Line of Blood and Dirt: Creating the Canada-United States Border Across Indigenous Lands
2023	Lianne C. Leddy	Serpent River Resurgence: Confronting Uranium Mining at Elliot Lake

== See also ==
- List of history awards
