= Pass system (Canadian history) =

Former segregationist policy of the Canadian government

The pass system was a system of internal passports for Indigenous Canadians between 1885 and 1941. It was administered by the Department of Indian Affairs (DIA), beginning after the 1885 North-West Rebellion as part of a broader effort to confine indigenous people to Indian reserves, then newly formed through the Numbered Treaties. The system, initially intended as a temporary measure to quell disorder in the prairie provinces, eventually became a permanent feature of federal Indian affairs policy.

Parliament never sanctioned the pass system; it was an administrative policy of the Department of Indian Affairs. The system remained in place until 1941; its purpose was to limit the freedom of movement of indigenous populations. Federal officials asserted that "Indians had to be kept separate from the rest of society for their own good, as contact tended to be injurious to them". The pass system was mainly implemented in Alberta and other regions in the western prairies, in Treaty 4, Treaty 6, and Treaty 7 areas. (Note: Cree and Saulteaux First Nation band governments representatives signed Treaty 4 or Qu'Appelle Treaty in 1874. Treaty 4 land included most of what is now southern Saskatchewan, as well as small areas in what is now western Manitoba and southeastern Alberta. Signatures to Treaty 6 were added from 1871 to 1877 by Plains Cree and Woods Cree, Assiniboine, and other band governments at Fort Carlton and Fort Pitt. Treaty 7 (1875) was signed by the Blackfoot, First Nation band governments in what is today the southern portion of Alberta.) The federal government formally terminated the system in 1941.

The pass system was administered by the Department of Indian Affairs (DIA); its authority to do so derived from a provision of the Indian Act which granted local Indian agents the powers of a justice of the peace. Under the broad powers granted to them to administer the reserves, the agents were responsible for the enforcement of the pass system; this was often done somewhat arbitrarily. Under the pretext of broadly defined vagrancy and loitering offences, North-West Mounted Police (NWMP) officers were authorized to detain Indigenous people who were off reserve without appropriate documentation. Detainees would typically be returned to their reserves; punishment for leaving the reserve without a pass could include imprisonment.

The 2015 report of the Truth and Reconciliation Commission (TRC) investigation described the policies of the pass system, the Indian reserve system, the Indian residential school system as "aggressive assimilation".

== Context ==
Map of Numbered Treaties of Canada. Borders are approximated.

(TRC) described the period from 1764 to 1969 as a time of "Displacement and Assimilation." From 1871 through the 1880s, as agricultural settlements expanded across the prairies, the Canadian government signed the Numbered Treaties, established the reserve system, and encouraged First Nations to adopt farming with the creation of industrial boarding schools. By the 1880s, after 80 years of over hunting, bison populations in the western prairies—upon which the First Nations depended—collapsed, leading to famine. Sarah Carter described how, "The buffalo was the foundation of the Plains economy, providing people not only with a crucial source of protein and vitamins but with many other necessities, including shelter, clothing, containers, and tools." In the late 18th and 19th centuries smallpox epidemics decimated indigenous communities. First Nations had no alternative but to accept the government's policies. The TRC report described the policies—including the reserve system, the residential schools, and the pass system—as "aggressive assimilation".

== Scope ==
Vancouver Island University historian, Keith D. Smith described the pass system in his 2009 book Liberalism, Surveillance, and Resistance: Indigenous Communities in Western Canada, 1877-1927, as a "highly effective component of a "coercive and flexible" "matrix" of restrictive "laws, regulations, and policies" to "confine Indigenous people to their reserves" and advance the "interests of non-Indigenous settlers." Smith wrote that, "Under this initiative, a reserve resident was required to first secure a written pass from their Indian agent if they wanted to visit family or friends in a nearby village; check on their children at a residential school; participate in a celebration or attend a cultural event in a neighbouring community; leave their reserve to hunt, fish, and collect resources; find paid employment; travel to urban centres; or leave the reserve for any other reason."

The pass system was mainly implemented in Treaty 4, Treaty 6, and Treaty 7 areas, the regions that became the prairie provinces.

== The role of federal government officials (1879–1890s) ==
John A. Macdonald (1815–1891), Edgar Dewdney (1835–1916), and Hayter Reed (1849–1936) were the three federal officials who were the "most prominent in the development and implementation of Indian policy" during this period. Macdonald was Canada's first Prime Minister from 1867 until 1873 and had a second term from 1878 until 1891. From 1879 to 1887 Macdonald, who was both Superintendent General of Indian Affair and Prime Minister, never visited the First Nations. Macdonald had promised a transcontinental railway to link British Columbia, which had joined the Confederation in 1871, with eastern Canada. When he won his second term, he was under pressure to complete the Canadian Pacific Railway. The last spike on November 7, 1885 marked the completion of the railway, for which Macdonald has been honoured by many and condemned by others. Canada's national story often celebrates Macdonald and the CP railway as it brought prosperity to many Canadians. Indigenous peoples were removed from their traditional lands to make way for the CPR, including approximately 5,000 Indigenous people who were "expelled from the Cypress Hills of Saskatchewan in the 1880s alone[...] One tactic used by local Indian agents against recalcitrant bands was to withhold rations." In his 2013 book Clearing the Plains: Disease, Politics of Starvation, and the Loss of Indigenous Life, Canadian scholar, James Daschuk, described how the "institutionalisation of a pass system, which confined First Nations peoples to reserves, later became a vector for the spread of infectious diseases." Ottawa-based Lawrence Vankoughnet, a top-ranking DIA bureaucrat, is often cited as the person responsible for cutting rations to First Nations reserves after the collapse of the buffalo herds, to minimize costs. Other historians place the blame largely on Dewdney who was known for engaging in power struggles with Vankoughnet. It was Vankoughnet who first alluded to a pass system in his 1884 annual report, claiming it had the potential to "prevent Indians from camping indiscriminately near white settlements."

In 1879, Macdonald had chosen Dewdney to succeed David Laird as Superintendent of Indian Affairs because of Dewdney's "firmness and tact, mature judgement and experience, and 'knowledge of the Indian character'." Dewdney served as Lieutenant Governor of the North-West Territories from December 3, 1881 until his resignation on July 1, 1888 as governor and as commissioner. Dewdney hired Hayter Reed (1849–1936) as his Assistant Commissioner. Reed, who was recommended by Dewdney as his replacement as Indian Commissioner, continued to implement departmental policies that promoted "protection, civilization, and assimilation." Reed said, "If the Indian is to become a source of profit to the country, it is clear that he must be amalgamated with the white population."

=== Role of local Indian agents ===
In the 1870s, the DIA put in place local Indian agents to "ensure social control and social transformation of First Nations groups." In 1885, the power of the local Indian agents was expanded giving them the authority as a justice of the peace in legal matters, as well as the right to confine Indigenous people to their reserves through the pass system. They already had the power "to recommend a Chief be removed from council and to force children either attend or to refuse a child to attend residential schools."

== Resistance and post-rebellion ==
In the mid-1880s in the Saskatchewan District of the North-West Territories, Treaty 6 Cree people led by Mistahimaskwa (Big Bear) (1825–1888) were facing starvation as bison herds disappeared. Big Bear rose up in frustration against the government, and protested treaty agreements. In five months in 1885, the Métis engaged in armed conflict with the Canadian government. These combined events are known as the North-West Rebellion. The armed response from the federal government ended the uprisings and discouraged others. After this unsuccessful rebellion, the Canadian government faced little opposition to its expansion, the arrival of settlers, and the construction of the railway.

Reed, then Indian agent for the Saskatchewan region, asked Macdonald to restrict the movement of Indians and stressed that the security and well-being of the country and the white settlers was at risk. On March 26, 1885, the North-West Mounted Police (NWMP) Superintendent attempted to seize what he considered an important supply point. As a result of that confrontation, 12 men of the NWMP died and 11 were wounded. Five Metis and 1 Cree were also killed in the battle.

In 1884 and 1885, the pass system emerged as Dewdney instructed the newly formed North-West Mounted Police to "detain native leaders as they attempted to travel to meetings, breaking up gatherings where legal resistance and court challenges were being discussed, and [used] rations to squeeze the Plains peoples into submission".

Following the 1885 rebellion, Macdonald and his administration introduced the "most restrictive policies and legislation" with the goal of "breaking up the tribal system and assimilating First Nations people". Historian Sarah Carter described the pass system—"first initiated on a large scale" during the 1885 crisis—as the "most notorious of the post-1885 measures." In the post-rebellion years, the eastern regions began to learn about how Plains Indigenous people were starving.

As requested by Dewdney, Reed, who was then Assistant Indian Commissioner to Indian Commissioner, drafted a "Memorandum on the Future Management of Indians" which outlined policies in response to the 1885 rebellion. The Memorandum supported harsh punishments for the perpetrators of the uprisings to prevent "future turbulence". It called for the abolition of the tribal system, the repression of medicine dances, and confinement of all rebels to their reserves through the use of a pass system. The horses of rebels should also be confiscated. Reed had already begun to implement a system of "keeping the Indians on their respective Reserves and not allowing any [to] leave them without passes", according to an August 16, 1885 memo from Reed to Dewdney. Reed wrote that, he was aware that the pass system was "hardly supportable by any legal enactment but we must do many things which can only be supported by common sense and by what may be for the general good. I get the police to send out daily and send any Indians without passes back to their reserves." Dewdney added his comments to the Memo and forwarded it to Macdonald and Deputy Superintendent General of Indian Affairs, Vankoughnet in August 1885. The pass system emerged from this final document with its revisions and refinements. The pass system was mentioned in correspondence between Macdonald and his Deputy Superintendent General of Indian Affairs, Lawrence Vankoughnet. An August 1885 letter said, "As to the disloyal bands this [pass system] should be carried out in consequence of their disloyalty. The system should be introduced in the loyal Bands as well and the advantage of the change pressed upon them. But no punishment for breaking bounds could be inflicted and in case of resistance on the grounds of Treaty right should not be insisted upon."

Vankoughnet said, "The status of the Indians in Canada is that of a minor with the government as the guardian. It has been stated that his "remarks represent the quintessential statement of federal government policy in the early period, 1873-1912."

According to the TRC, Indian Affairs instituted the pass system following the North-West Rebellion, with the intention of confining First Nations "to their reserves in selected areas of the prairie west".

== Aggressive assimilation: reserves, residential schools, and the pass system ==
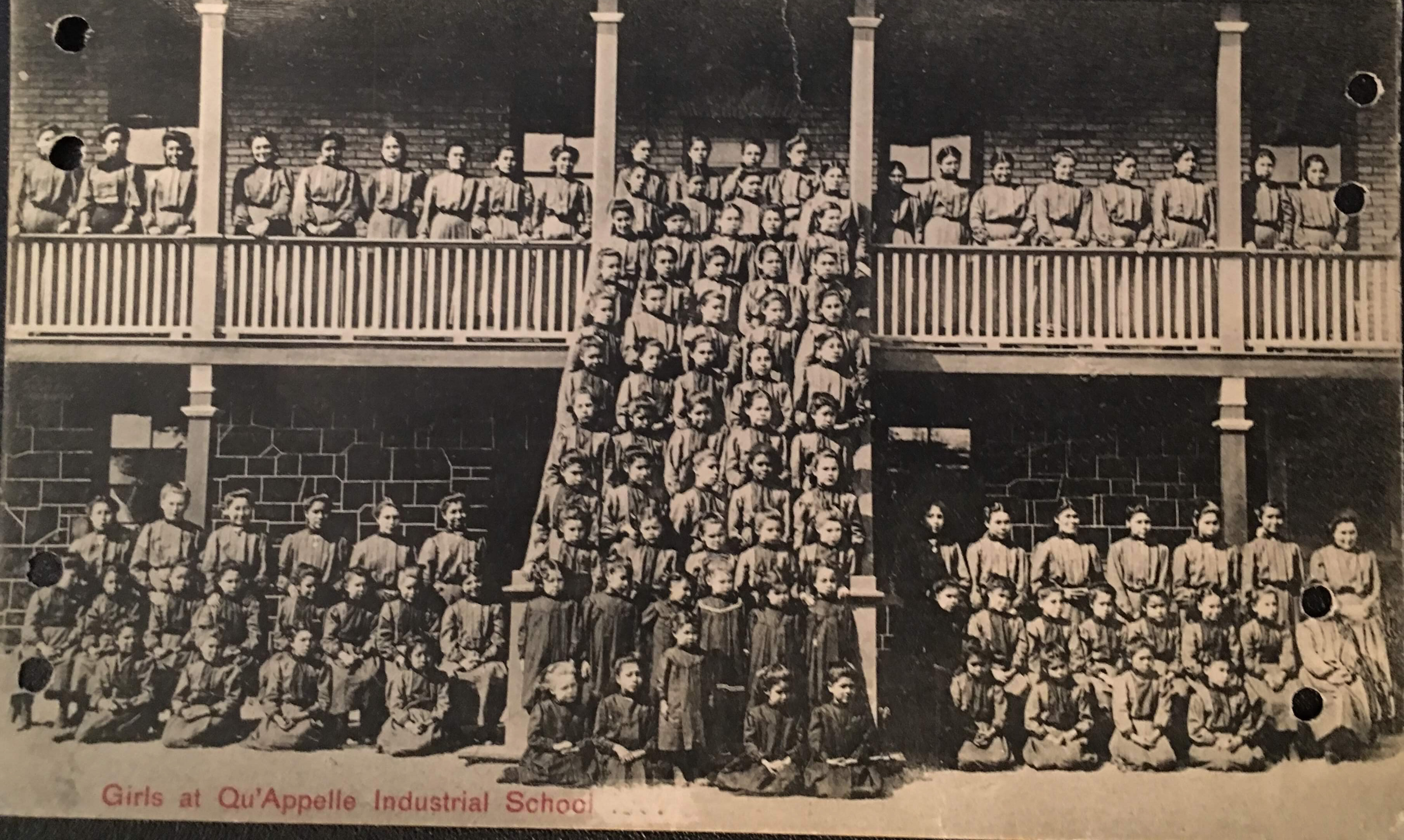
Female students at Qu'Appelle Indian Residential School

The pass system is considered to be one aspect of the assimilation process that also included the reserve system first introduced in Upper Canada in the 1830s and the residential school system, with its roots in the boys' day school for Six Nations Reserve children—the Mohawk Institute in Brantford, Upper Canada in 1828—the first of the residential schools established with the goal of assimilating Indigenous children. The March 14, 1879 Report on Industrial Schools for Indians and Half-Breeds by Nicolas Flood Davin (Note: Known as the Davin Report.) was commissioned by Macdonald and informed the establishment of industrial boarding schools in Canada, the precursors of the Canadian Indian residential school system. Davin reported on American industrial schools that had been introduced while Ulysses S. Grant was President of the United States.

According to a 1980 Geographical Review article, Canadian government policy in the 1880s and 1890s "set the pattern for the segregation of prairie Indians from Canadian society, despite government rhetoric that promised to assimilate the Indian in Canadian life."

As First Nations members were moved to the reserves, many of them became successful farmers and ranchers. The NWMP preferred to buy hay from Treaty 7 ranchers since it was considered superior feed for NWMP horses. However, non-indigenous farmers and ranchers believed that First Nations farmers were being given handouts, which were seen as unfair competition. That became one of the reasons that First Nations had the pass system imposed on them.

On July 11, 1856, Sir John A. Macdonald wrote to the Provincial Secretary in Toronto in a letter stating, "2nd: As to the mode of managing the Indian property so as to secure its full benefit to the Indians without impeding the settlement of the country."

=== Pass system had no legal basis ===
The policy—which was never enacted through legislation, but was endorsed by the ministry of Indian Affairs—vested Indian Agents with the authority to control the length of time and the purpose of leaves and visits to reserves, through the use of obligatory signed passes, according to the University of Saskatchewan's Department of Native Studies' professor, Frank Laurie Barron.

Because the "ban lacked any legislative basis it was enforced through an amendment to the Indian Act giving the Indian agent the powers of a Justice of the Peace so that he might enforce the provisions of the criminal code dealing with vagrancy and loitering."

Those who did not possess a pass or permit were charged under the Vagrancy Act. Many officers knew that the First Nations members were not able to pursue legal matters in court. The North West Mounted Police Superintendent McIlree in Calgary had his officers return people from Sarcee (Tsuu T'ina) to the reserve, whether or not they had a pass.

Prime Minister Macdonald said that, "I beg to inform you that there has never been any legal authority for compelling Indians who leave their Reserve to return to them, but it has always been felt that it would be a great mistake for this matter to stand too strictly in the letter of the law."

Macdonald was aware that the measure violated the treaties. The only way that the pass system could be implemented was through the powers that Indian agents held, which was similar to that of the police, over the First Nations.

== Premiership of Wilfrid Laurier ==
Wilfrid Laurier, who was a Liberal Prime Minister from 1896 until 1911, said that Dewdney had caused unrest among the First Nations, which in turn had caused the North-West Rebellion. Dewdney was accused of being too generous to the First Nations because he increased rations and met with various groups to inquire about the treatment First Nation peoples were getting from government officials.

Clifford Sifton served as Laurier's Minister of the Interior from 1896 until 1905. Sifton "left Indian policy in the hands of an "Indians Affairs" bureaucracy with little sympathy for the aspirations of First Nations." Sifton's mandate was to oversee development of the land, to shape immigration policy to increase immigration, particularly to attract immigrants to the Prairie provinces who would contribute to building "a nation of good farmers." To fulfill this mandate Sifton promoted railroads by convincing the federal government to help finance the Canadian National Railway which included a section that went through the Crow's Nest Pass. Under Sifton, the DOI "aggressively promoted settlement in Western Canada". Sifton had reorganized the department early in his mandate, placing the DIA—which was intended to focus First Nations' concerns—at a lower priority compared to the Interior department—which supported the rights of settlers. This was also reflected in the people hired in the DIA—they had little sympathy for First Nations and no experience working with them.

== Lasting impact of 60 years of the pass system ==
The Numbered Treaties were signed in the 1870s granting the newly established government of Canada in the Post-Confederation period large tracts of land throughout the Prairies, Canadian North and Northwestern Ontario on traditional indigenous lands. Barron described how First Nations, who had once served as allies to the British, became wards of the newly formed Canadian nation. In the 1870s, the government undertook a project of remaking First Nations to become more like the "white rural farmer". Reserves and residential schools became the sites for that training.

The First Nations "were cut off from their children in residential schools, other relatives, and dispossessed of the ability to freely hunt, fish and trade, resulting in devastating and lasting financial impacts, with obvious human consequences." The policy's effects included First Nations' inability to conduct trade and commerce or to attend cultural and social gatherings with neighboring Reserves and their isolation from Canadian society.

Bourgeault described how the pass system and vagrancy laws prevented First Nations from participating in the larger economy except as labourers. The sale of agricultural products for example was seriously restricted by these policies.

The pass system affected hunting, commerce, and cultural ceremonies. First Nations visiting other reserves were required to obtain a pass from the Indian agent, regardless of the proximity of the reserves to each other. Cecile Many Guns from Brocket, Alberta, in 1973 told of two men visiting from another nearby reserve without a permit. The police retrieved them and forced them to sleep on a stone floor for the night. The next day, the two men were returned to where they came from. She indicated in her interview with Dila Provost and Albert Yellowhorn incidents details on the lack of dignity shown to Indians, who were viewed with suspicion by white people.

Victoria McHugh recalled that even going from Siksika to Tsuu T'ina, people were allowed only up to five days to visit and return to Siksika. Bill McLean mentioned that the missionaries, with the help of the North-West Mounted Police (NWMP) and government officials tried to stop the Sun Dance, and condemn the ceremony. Sun Dances had allowed First Nations from various groups to travel from community to community, but the pass system did not allow for the intercommunity travel. Elva Lefthand said that hunting became more restrictive under the pass system.

The pass system in the prairies, which is now considered to be "segregationist scheme", was studied by a delegation from South African in 1902, as a "method of social control".

== End of the pass system ==
In the 1890s, First Nation farmers protested the pass system, and many Indian agents and farmer instructors sided with them. As a result, they were fired for their efforts to bring to light that First Nations were being required to get a permit to sell grain and other farm products. The pass system continued to be enforced until the 1940s, and in some cases into the 1950s.

Objections to the policy were raised by the NWMP in 1893, and Commissioner William Herchmer instructed police to request, not order, First Nations to go back to their reserves. Herchmer was aware that the pass system was not entrenched in law. Reed wrote in a June 14, 1893 letter that he disagreed strongly with Herchmer, saying it was preferable that the NWMP abstain from 'requesting' that First Nations return to their reserves, because it would draw their attention to the fact that the NWMP were "powerless to enforce" these requests. He said, "Had the order been kept quiet, the Indians might have remained for some time in ignorance, but as I have already seen references to it in the public press, no expectation of withholding it from them need now be entertained."

The pass system was phased out after a July 11, 1941 letter was circulated to all local Indian agents by then Department of Mines and Resources Indian branch director, Harold McGill. The letter included orders for all passes to be sent to Ottawa for destruction.

== Missing archives ==
The policy is the subject of a 2015 documentary film, The Pass System. In producing his 50-minute documentary which uncovered the "hidden history of the pass system", filmmaker Alex Williams spent five years searching in archives and in communities for evidence of its existence.

In her June 26, 2016 article in the Toronto Star which discussed Williams's 2015 documentary, Joanna Smith wrote that the federal government admitted that "some records of the pass system—the apartheid-like policy that forbade First Nations from leaving their reserves without written permission—were destroyed before anyone knew of their historical value."

A 1941 federal government directive requested that all passbooks be returned to Ottawa for destruction. Williams says that the reason for the directive "remains a mystery." One of the Saskatchewan Archives Board's original signed permission slips, that had been issued by the Department of Indian Affairs on June 3, 1897, is featured in the documentary. An adult resident, Sawphawpahkayo, from a reserve not far from Duck Lake, Saskatchewan had received a 10-day pass in order to get married. Williams was able to piece together the hidden stories with "first and second hand accounts of elders who experienced and lived under this system or have information that was passed down of their parents and grandparents about living under this system of segregation."

By 1974, when the Treaties and Historical Research Centre undertook a study for the DIA to "determine whether the pass system had even existed", archival material such as historical passes and stubs, had already been destroyed. A director of library and archives at the Calgary-headquartered Glenbow Museum said in a 2016 interview with The Star, that it was "absolutely astonishing" that in 1974, "federal government had to rely on outside sources to study its own policy."

Even among First Nations and in Canadian society, very little is known today about the pass system and the policies surrounding its implementation.

== The pass system in literature ==
In his 1973 book "Voices of the Plains Cree", Reverend Edward Ahenakew's fictional character Old Kayam described how every man on the reserve had to beg for permits. Kayam said, "for myself I would rather starve than go beg for such a trifling thing as a permit to sell one load of hay."

== See also ==
- Bureau of Indian Affairs' Pass System in the United States during the same era
- Pass laws, a similar system in South Africa
- Israeli permit regime in the West Bank
