= Permit System =

Former legislation in Canada

The Permit System was a piece of federal legislation in 19th century Canada that controlled Indigenous farmers' ability to sell and trade goods. This legislation—assented to in 1881—imposed specific restrictions on Indigenous farmers. It stated that any “sale, barter, exchange, or gift” of “any grain or root crops, or other produce" grown on either Indian Reserve in the Northwest Territories, the District of Keewatin, or the Province of Manitoba by an Indigenous person was prohibited without prior approval from the Governor in Council. Anyone caught receiving these goods from First Nations band members without approval could be fined up to a hundred dollars and spend up to three months in jail.

== History ==
An unstable economy caused hardships for settlers due to competition from a large influx of immigrants, and a drop in the price of goods may have contributed to the creation of legal discrimination against Indigenous farmers in these areas. The economic climate of the prairies from the 1870s to 1890s changed rapidly with this immigration which, as Carl Beal argues, caused the prairie market of the 1880s to become saturated with product and laborers, with supply outpacing demand and prices of goods falling. Indigenous farmers were cited as the problem by some settler merchants in the local newspaper. Beal highlights this ongoing debate recorded in the Saskatchewan Herald: although many people were critical of the accusations that Indigenous farmers were causing market problems for settlers, in October 1888 the Saskatchewan Herald quoted Indian Agent Hayter Reed as saying that the Department of Indian Affairs “would do whatever it reasonably could to prevent the Indian from entering into competition with the settlers during the present hard times.”
