= Tina Loo =

Canadian historian (born 1962)

Tina Merrill Loo FRSC (born 1962) is a Canadian historian. Loo is a professor of history at the University of British Columbia (UBC) with interests in Canadian, legal and environmental history. At UBC she has held a Canada Research Chair in Environmental History and a Brenda and David McLean Chair in Canadian Studies.

== Career and honours ==
Loo received a Bachelor of Science degree from the University of British Columbia in 1984, a Master of Arts degree from the University of Toronto in 1986, and her PhD from UBC in 1990. Prior to joining UBC's Department of History in 2003, Loo taught at McGill University, where she was the youngest-ever holder of the Seagram Chair of Canadian Studies, and Simon Fraser University. In 2003 Loo was appointed by then-Prime Minister Jean Chrétien to an Advisory Committee for the development of the Canada History Centre. She is a Fellow at the University of Toronto's Centre of Criminology. Loo also trained as a climate change educator as part of the Climate Reality Project.

Loo's research has won numerous accolades. Her 1994 book Making Law, Order, and Authority in British Columbia won the Canadian Historical Association's 1995 Clio Prize for the best book in British Columbia and/or Yukon history. Her 2006 book States of Nature was awarded the 2007 Sir John A. Macdonald Prize (now the CHA Best Scholarly Book in Canadian History Prize) for the best book in Canadian history from the CHA, and was short-listed for the Association's 2010 François-Xavier Garneau Medal. The book was also the winner of the 2008 Harold Adams Innis Prize for best English book in the Social Sciences from the Canadian Federation for the Humanities and Social Sciences. Loo's 2011 article, co-written with Meg Stanley, "An Environmental History of Progress," won the 2011 Canadian Historical Review award for best article. Her latest book, Moved by the State, was awarded the CHA's 2020 Best Book in Political History Prize.

In 2016 Loo was elected a Fellow of the Royal Society of Canada.

== Selected works ==
- Making Law, Order, and Authority in British Columbia, 1821-1871. University of Toronto Press, 1994.
- States of Nature: Conserving Canada's Wildlife in the Twentieth Century. UBC Press, 2006.
- "Disturbing the Peace: Environment and Justice on a Northern River." Environmental History special issue on Canada. 12 (4): 895-919. 2007.
- "An Environmental History of Progress: Damming the Peace and Columbia Rivers." With Meg Stanley. Canadian Historical Review. 92 (3): 399-427. September 2011.
- "High Modernism, Conflict, and the Nature of Change in Canada: A Look at Seeing Like a State." Canadian Historical Review. 97 (1): 34-58. 2016.
- Moved by the State: Forced Relocation and Making a Good Life in Postwar Canada. UBC Press, 2019.
