= François-Xavier Garneau =

French Canadian notary, poet, civil servant and liberal

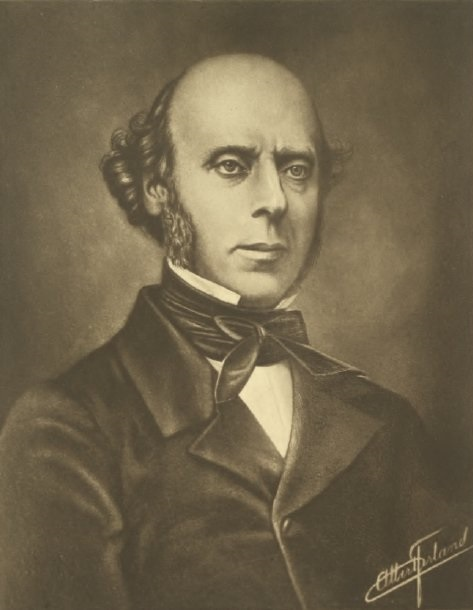
- François-Xavier Garneau
- Born: June 15, 1809; Quebec City, Lower Canada
- Died: February 2 or February 3, 1866 (aged 56); Quebec City, Canada East
- Occupations: notary, civil servant, historian, poet

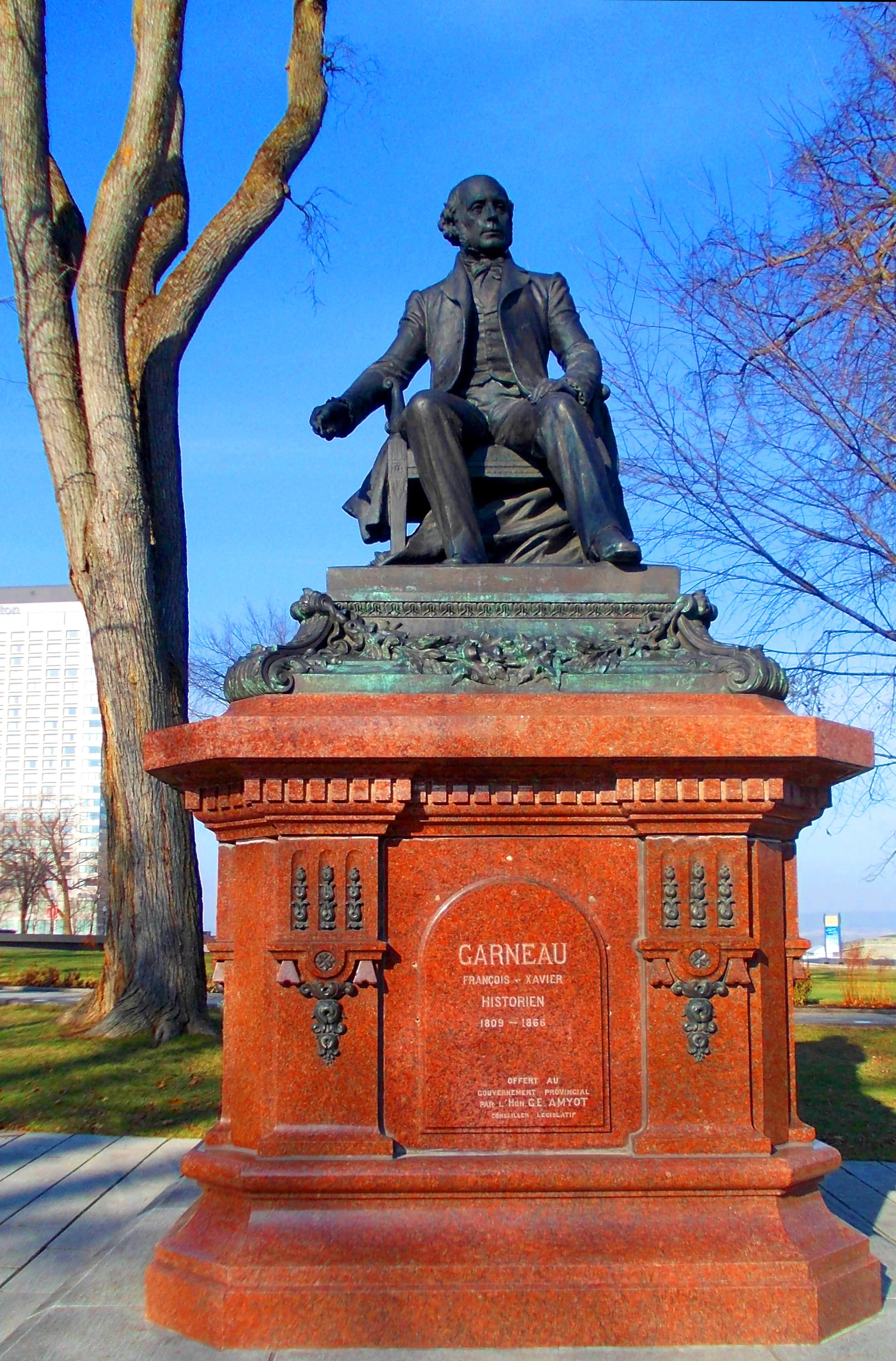
Monument of François-Xavier Garneau in Québec City

François-Xavier Garneau (June 15, 1809 – February 2 or February 3, 1866) was a nineteenth-century French Canadian notary, poet, civil servant and liberal who wrote a three-volume history of the French Canadian nation entitled Histoire du Canada between 1845 and 1848.

== Biography ==
Garneau was born in Quebec City and in 1821 he entered a school which had been opened in the basement of the chapel of the Congrégation des Hommes de la Haute Ville. Then Garneau educated at Quebec seminary, studied law, and was admitted as a notary in 1830. Subsequently, he became clerk of the legislative assembly, member of the council of public instruction, and city clerk of Quebec, which office he held from 1845 until his death on February 2 or February 3, 1866. Garneau was an honorary member of literary and historical societies in the United States and Canada, and for several years president of the Institut Canadien of Quebec.

== Histoire du Canada ==
Garneau argued that the Conquest was a tragedy, the consequence of which was a perpetual struggle against the forces of English Canada for the French Canadian nation; this struggle would continue into the future as long as French Canadians were under the oppressive reign of the British. The book was originally written as a response to the Durham report, which claimed that French Canadian culture was stagnant and that it would be best served through Anglophone assimilation. It was first translated in 1866 and by then "the accepted national history" of French Canadians.

== Legacy ==
=== François-Xavier Garneau Medal ===
The François-Xavier Garneau Medal is the highest award given by the Canadian Historical Association and is given once every five years for an outstanding Canadian contribution to historical research. Recipients were: Louise Dechêne (1980), Michael Bliss (1985), John M. Beattie (1990), Joy Parr (1995), Gérard Bouchard (2000), Timothy Brook (2005), John C. Weaver (2010) and Bettina Bradbury (2015).

=== 2010 Winter Olympics ===
Canadian actor Donald Sutherland narrated the following quote from one of his poems at the opening ceremonies of the 2010 Winter Olympics in Vancouver.

In what other climate does the Queen of Silence
Show us more splendour?
I love, Oh Canada, night, the vast plain
Shining with whiteness!

== Works ==
- Histoire du Canada depuis sa découverte jusqu'à nos jours, 1845–52, 1st ed. (BAnQ: vol. 1. 2, 3, 4), 1852, 2d ed., 1859, 3rd ed., 1882, 4th ed.(IA: vol. 1, 2, 3, 4)
- Voyage en Angleterre et en France, dans les années 1831, 1832 et 1833, 1855. (BAnQ: online)
- Abrégé de l'histoire du Canada, depuis sa découverte jusqu'à 1840 : à l'usage des maisons d'éducation, 1858 (IA: online)
- History of Canada: From the Time of its Discovery Till the Union Year, 1860 (IA: vol. 1, 2, 3)
- Additions à l'histoire du Canada, 1864 (BAnQ: online)
