= Michael Bliss =

Canadian historian (1941–2017)

Michael Bliss OC FRSC
- Born: John William Michael Bliss; January 18, 1941; Leamington, Ontario, Canada
- Died: May 18, 2017 (aged 76); Toronto, Ontario, Canada

Academic background
- Education: University of Toronto (BA, MA, PhD)
- Thesis: A Living Profit (1972)
- Doctoral advisor: Ramsay Cook

Academic work
- Discipline: History
- Sub-discipline: Business history; Canadian history; medical history
- Institutions: University of Toronto
- Doctoral students: Veronica Strong-Boag

John William Michael Bliss (January 18, 1941 – May 18, 2017) was a Canadian historian and author. Though his early works focused on business and political history, he also wrote biographies of physicians Frederick Banting, William Osler and Harvey Cushing. Bliss was a frequent commentator on political events and issues. He was an Officer of the Order of Canada.

== Early life ==
Michael Bliss was born on January 18, 1941, in Leamington, Ontario, Bliss was raised in nearby Kingsville, Ontario. His father, Quartus Bliss, was a Kingsville-based physician who encouraged Michael to enter the medical field. In an autobiographical essay, Bliss explained that his aspirations were shattered when watching his father suture a drunk's face:

[T]here was a Sunday afternoon when Dad’s and my Scrabble game was interrupted by the appearance at the office door of a policeman with a drunk in tow, the drunk having been in a fight and suffering a badly slashed face. Dad had to sew him up, suturing both inside and outside the cheek, and invited me to watch what would be a demonstration of his surgical skill ... with blood and alcohol fumes everywhere, reflecting on my own complete disinterest in and lack of manual skills, I decided that this was not what I wanted to do in life. And that was the end of my ambition to be a doctor.

== Academic pursuits ==
Bliss entered the University of Toronto in 1958, and received his Bachelor of Arts as an undergraduate in University College, Master of Arts, and Doctor of Philosophy degrees there. He was appointed to the faculty in 1968 and by the time of his retirement in 2006 had attained the elite rank of University Professor.

His doctoral dissertation, which was supervised by Ramsay Cook, was a social history of Canadian business, an analysis of the "thoughts and dreams" of businessmen in Canada during the National Policy years. It was published under the title A Living Profit. In 1978 he published a major biography of Sir Joseph Flavelle, "A Canadian Millionaire", and in 1987 the first history of business in Canada, "Northern Enterprise".

In 1982, he began a mid-career transition to medical history with his book "The Discovery of Insulin". This 1982 book was the basis for the award-winning Glory Enough for All, a 1988 Canadian television movie. He has published biographies of two Canadians, the discoverer of insulin Sir Frederick Banting and the famous physician Sir William Osler. In 2005, he published a biography of the American neurosurgeon Harvey Cushing, himself also a biographer of Osler.

Like J. L. Granatstein, his criticism of excessively specialized social history has made him a controversial figure in Canadian historiography.

Bliss has been a frequent commentator on Canadian politics for newspapers, magazines, and television, and has lectured widely in North America and Europe.

In a 2005 profile for the National Post, former student John Turley-Ewart writes: "In the 1990s, when I worked as his teaching assistant, it was not unusual to see 300 people from all walks of life – full-time students, business people, civil servants, journalists – packed into his evening lectures." He was nominated by Turley-Ewart as Canada's "leading public intellectual", part of a series that ran in National Post.

== Awards and distinctions ==
In 1998, he was made a Member of the Order of Canada and was promoted to Officer in 2013. His books have won various prizes, including the Welch Medal of the American Association for the History of Medicine, the Tyrrell Medal of the Royal Society of Canada, three Jason Hannah Medals of the Royal Society of Canada, the Garneau, Macdonald, and Ferguson prizes of the Canadian Historical Association, and the National Business Book Award. His book on Osler was shorted for the Governor General's Award. He was an honorary member of the Harvey Club of London, the oldest medical club in Canada, for his historical biographical contributions on Banting, another honorary member of the Harvey Club. He is an honorary fellow of the Royal College of Physicians and Surgeons of Canada and holds honorary degrees from the University of Prince Edward Island, McMaster University, McGill, the University of British Columbia, and the University of Toronto. In 2008 his students published a festschrift, "Essays in Honour of Michael Bliss: Figuring the Social". In 2016 he became the first historian inducted into the Canadian Medical Hall of Fame.

In 2011, he received the Lifetime Achievement Award from the American Osler Society in 2010

== Political commentary ==
Bliss frequently commented on current events, contributing essays to various magazine and newspapers, including The Globe and Mail. He opposed the Meech Lake Accord and the Charlottetown Accord and the 1999 NATO bombing of Kosovo and he advocated for the abolition of the Canadian monarchy. He also strongly criticized Stephen Harper's 2006 move to recognize the Québécois as a nation.

== Death ==
Michael Bliss died on May 18, 2017, in Toronto, Ontario, at the age of 76.

== Works ==
- 1974: A Living Profit: studies in the social history of Canadian business 1883-1911
- 1975: Confederation, 1867: The Creation of the Dominion of Canada
- 1978: A Canadian Millionaire: The Life and Business Times for Sir Joseph Flavelle ISBN 978-0770516574
- 1982: The Discovery of Insulin ISBN 978-0226058986
- 1984: Frederick Banting: A Biography Bliss, Michael (January 1992). 1993 2nd edition. ISBN 0802073867.
- 1987: Northern Enterprise: Five Centuries of Canadian Business 2018 edition ISBN 978-1-77244-151-2
- 1991: Plague: A Story of Smallpox in Montreal(nominated for Governor General's Award) ISBN 978-0006378907
- 1994: Right Honourable Men: the descent of Canadian politics from Macdonald to Mulroney, HarperCollins ISBN 978-0-00-255071-0
- 1999: William Osler: a Life in Medicine ISBN 978-0-19-532960-5 (nominated for Governor General's Award)
- 2005: Harvey Cushing: a Life in Surgery ISBN 0-8020-8950-X
- 2010: The Making of Modern Medicine: Turning Points in the Treatment of Disease ISBN 978-0226059013
- 2011: Writing History: A Professor's Life ISBN 978-1525237416 (a first-person memoir)

Awards
| Preceded by Christopher Armstrong | Toronto Book Award; 1979; With: William Dendy and John Morgan Gray | Succeeded by Raymond Souster |
| Preceded by Timothy Findley | Toronto Book Award; 1979; With: William Dendy and John Morgan Gray | Succeeded by Stephen A. Speisman |
| Preceded by H. V. Nelles | Toronto Book Award; 1979; With: William Dendy and John Morgan Gray | Succeeded by Stephen A. Speisman |
| Preceded by Claude Bissell | Toronto Book Award; 1983; With: Lucy Booth Martyn | Succeeded by Edith G. Firth |
| Preceded by Marian Engel | Toronto Book Award; 1983; With: Lucy Booth Martyn | Succeeded by Gerald Killan |
| Preceded by Marian Engel | Toronto Book Award; 1983; With: Lucy Booth Martyn | Succeeded by Eric Wright |
| Preceded by Louise Dechêne | François-Xavier Garneau Medal; 1985 | Succeeded by J. M. Beattie |
| Preceded by John Wendell Holmes | J. B. Tyrrell Historical Medal; 1988 | Succeeded by Hubert Charbonneau |
| Preceded by John Wendell Holmes | J. B. Tyrrell Historical Medal; 1988 | Succeeded by Jacques Légaré |
