= Imperial Plots =

2016 history by Sarah Carter

Imperial Plots: Women, Land, and the Spadework of British Colonialism on the Canadian Prairies
- Author: Sarah Carter
- Language: English
- Subjects: Homesteading; women; colonialism
- Genre: History
- Publisher: University of Manitoba Press
- Publication date: 2016
- Publication place: Canada
- Media type: Print
- Pages: 480
- Awards: CHA Best Scholarly Book in Canadian History Prize
- ISBN: 978-0-88755-818-4

Imperial Plots: Women, Land, and the Spadework of British Colonialism on the Canadian Prairies is a 2016 book by Sarah Carter, professor of history at the University of Alberta. The book documents the history of female homesteaders on the Canadian Prairies and the relationship between that history and Canadian colonialism.

== Contents ==
Before Imperial Plots, Carter had published books focusing on the history of farming and marriage policies on the Prairies in the late 19th and early 20th centuries. Imperial Plots focuses on the gendered aspects of the history of homesteading in Canada, and the ways that this history interacted with ideas about race. In Canada, women were denied the same homesteading rights accorded to men from 1876 to 1930, when the homesteading era, integral to the Canadian settlement of the Prairies, was largely complete. This differed from homesteading in the United States, where single women were permitted to claim homesteads. In order to qualify for a Canadian homestead during this period, a woman would have to be classified as the sole head of a household, which effectively meant a widow with dependent children. Carter documents the history of widow homesteaders, along with the efforts of women to expand homesteading eligibility to more women, and the agricultural efforts of women who, unable to homestead, managed to acquire land of their own through other means, including through purchasing land.

Carter argues that women were integral to the success of any homestead they participated in, performing essential labour and household management, while at the same time being denied the same legal rights as men. Moreover, widows who homesteaded in Canada often proved more successful than men, although their position tended to be socially stigmatized. Carter documents the work of successful farmers like Georgina Binnie-Clark, who purchased land and challenged traditional gender norms in the process, advocating for more land rights for women. Carter also examines the historical role of Indigenous women in agriculture on the Plains.

One of the book's central arguments focuses on British imperialism, and how ideas about race impacted the gendered history of homesteading. For British officials, the Canadian Prairies offered an opportunity to deport "excess" women, who had diminishing opportunities in Great Britain. However, Canadian officials clearly envisioned the role for such women as being wives, mothers, and domestic workers rather than farmers themselves, yet still an integral ingredient to the dispossession of land from Indigenous peoples. Such officials feared that female farmers denigrated their femininity and in turn their model British society; this was also part of an effort to distinguish western Canada from what was seen as the more "chaotic" United States. Women looking to expand their opportunities to homestead in Canada thus often mobilized the same xenophobic rhetoric that would prove integral to enfranchisement, in particular that single women were better suited than non-white men to advancing Canadian-British interests on the Prairies. Carter argues that such women articulated "an imperialist vision to demonstrate their fitness for the land denied to them yet available to 'foreign' men". This notion was central to the Homesteads-for-British-Women campaign, which created a petition that garnered thousands of signatures in support of would-be women homesteaders. However, such arguments were not enough to overcome an adherence to traditional gender roles when it came to homesteading. As such, in examining women's homesteading efforts, Imperial Plots documents the development and maintenance of colonial policies designed to both expand Canadian power and maintain a subordinate position for women within western Canadian society.

== Awards and reception ==
Imperial Plots has won numerous awards. In 2017, the Canadian Historical Association awarded the book both its Clio Prize for the best book in Prairie history and its most prestigious annual award, the CHA Best Scholarly Book in Canadian History Prize. The same year, the book won the Gita Chaudhuri Prize from the Western Association of Women Historians, with the prize committee noting the book's contribution to the history of women in rural environments. Imperial Plots was also a finalist for the Wilson Book Prize and the Stubbendieck Great Plains Book Prize from the Center for Great Plains Studies at the University of Nebraska.

Publishers Weekly wrote in a review that in Imperial Plots Carter "shows how history can be well documented, provocative, and entertaining."

== See also ==
- Dominion Lands Act
