= François-Xavier Garneau Medal =

Book prize

The François-Xavier Garneau Medal is a book prize awarded by the Canadian Historical Association. Awarded only every five years since it was first awarded in 1980, the CHA describes the Medal as its "most prestigious" prize, honouring "an outstanding Canadian contribution to historical research." The Medal is named for François-Xavier Garneau, a 19th-century Quebecois poet and civil servant who wrote a classic three-volume history of the French Canadian nation entitled Histoire du Canada.

== Recipients ==
Year	Winner	Title
1980	Louise Dechêne	Habitants et marchands de Montréal au XVIIe siècle (1974)
1985	Michael Bliss	A Canadian Millionaire: The Life and Business Times of Sir Joseph Flavelle (1978)
1990	John M. Beattie	Crime and the Courts in England 1660-1800 (1986)
1995	Joy Parr	The Gender of Breadwinners: Women, Men, and Change in Two Industrial Towns, 1880-1950 (1990)
2000	Gérard Bouchard	Quelques arpents d'Amérique : population, économie, famille au Saguenay, 1838-1971 (1996)
2005	Timothy Brook	The Confusions of Pleasure: Commerce and Culture in Ming China (1998)
2010	John C. Weaver	The Great Land Rush and the Making of the Modern World (2003)
2015	Bettina Bradbury	Wife to Widow: Lives, Laws, and Politics in Nineteenth-Century Montreal (2011)
2020	Shirley Tillotson	Give and Take: The Citizen-Taxpayer and the Rise of Canadian Democracy (2017)

== See also ==
- List of history awards
