= Peasant Farm Policy =

Discriminatory Canadian agricultural policy in the 1890s

The Peasant Farm Policy was a set of Canadian governmental administrative guidelines which placed limits on the agricultural practices of First Nations on the Canadian Prairies between 1889 and 1897.

== Origins ==
During negotiations of the Numbered Treaties, First Nations were promised assistance in transitioning to sedentary life on Indian reserves and expected to receive the contemporary tools used in agriculture. The text of the treaties themselves promised various amounts of farming equipment. Treaty 6, for example, was to provide “four hoes for every family… two spades per family… one plough for every three families… one harrow for every three families… two scythes and one whetstone, and two hay forks… for every family… [and] one grindstone and one auger for each Band." Cree representatives at Fort Carlton had been told that, should they take treaty, the government would be generous so that they would become wealthy. Historian Derek Whitehouse-Strong suggests they had an expectation that treaty terms "would allow reserve populations...to compete successfully in the agricultural economy of the Canadian prairies."

Early farming was, at least in some places, quite successful. The large Blackfoot reserves in Southern Alberta apparently produced an "immense" potato crop in 1884 and achieved good sales. Local settlers, often unaware of the terms of the treaties and hostile to their Indigenous neighbours, felt the assistance being given to First Nations gave them an unfair advantage and complained to the Indian Commissioner. Moreover, the developers of the peasant farming policy believed (according to their theories of sociocultural evolution) that Indigenous farmers were socially incapable of beginning farming with modern equipment and methods. That would be an "unnatural leap". It was considered that instead, they should begin with agriculture akin to that traditionally used by European peasants.

== Policy ==
In 1889, Hayter Reed, then deputy superintendent general of Indian affairs, distributed the policy to Indian agents administering Indian reserves. It restricted the use of agricultural tools to simple hand tools. Seeds should be hand-planted, and crops should be harvested with scythes, bound by hand, threshed with flails, and ground with hand mills. First Nations were forbidden from acquiring modern tools, even at their own expense. Even simple tools (e.g. harrows, hayforks, carts and yokes), moreover, should be made by the farmers themselves rather than purchased.

The policy also limited the amount of land First Nations could cultivate or and the amount of produce they could sell. Reserve farmers were told to reduce their personal wheat farms to a single acre, along with a root and vegetable garden. Cattle would be restricted to a cow or two per family.

== Outcomes ==
Combined with the pass system and the permit system (requiring permission from an Indian agent before the sale, barter, exchange or gifting of a farm's products), the policy severely limited the potential for First Nations farming on the Prairies. Historian Walter Hildebrandt suggests that the Department of Indian Affairs "seemed more concerned with keeping the Natives under control than with assisting them fully to develop their skills as agriculturalists".
