= Dammed =

2020 non-fiction book by Brittany Luby

Dammed: The Politics of Loss and Survival in Anishinaabe Territory
- Author: Brittany Luby
- Language: English
- Subject: Industrial development
- Genre: Indigenous history; Environmental history
- Published: 2020
- Publisher: University of Manitoba Press
- Publication place: Canada
- Media type: Print
- Pages: 256
- Awards: CHA Best Scholarly Book in Canadian History Prize
- ISBN: 9780887558740

Dammed: The Politics of Loss and Survival in Anishinaabe Territory is a 2020 book by Brittany Luby, associate professor of history at the University of Guelph. The book charts the impacts of the damming of the Winnipeg River in the Lake of the Woods region on the local Anishinaabe population, focusing in particular on the Dalles 38C reserve located downstream from Kenora, Ontario.

== Contents ==
Luby, drawing on both archival and oral sources, presents the history of the local Anishinaabe population at the Dalles 38C from the second half of the twentieth century, when the Winnipeg River was first dammed at Kenora to power a paper and pulp mill, through to the 1960s, when the construction of the Whitedog Falls hydroelectric generating station further upstream was completed. Luby argues that even after settler-colonial encroachment the Anishinaabe were socially and economically sustainable at Dalles 38C; however, the damming of the Winnipeg River, seen as key to the modernization of Kenora and Ontario, degraded the local environment and undermined the local Anishinaabe society.

The book first charts the ways in which colonial authorities undermined Anishinaabe riparian rights, which appear to have been enshrined in Treaty 3, in order to proceed with industrial development. Luby then examines the impact of such developments on local transportation, labour opportunities, water quality, and reproductive health, among other things.

Dammed challenges long-held tenets of Canadian historiography, such as the centre-periphery model – Luby recasts Anishinaabe territory as its own centre, as opposed to colonial conceptions of it being on the periphery of Canada's centre – and the notion of the postwar period as launching an affluent society. On the latter, Luby writes:

"This book makes clear that Indigenous Peoples did not form part of Canada’s affluent society after 1945. Instead, it demonstrates how federal and provincial actors removed resources from Indigenous communities and reduced the income-generating potential of Indigenous families specifically to benefit Anglo-settlers generally. Postwar Canada was not an affluent society; it was (and it remains) a colonial one."

Dammed has been lauded for its methodology and in particular for centering Anishinaabe oral testimony. Writing in the Canadian Historical Review, Jean L. Manqre noted that such an approach enables Luby to avoid focusing on victimization and to instead emphasize dynamic forms of Indigenous resistance in the face of environmental change.

== Awards ==
Dammed won three awards from the Canadian Historical Association in 2021: the CHA Best Scholarly Book in Canadian History Prize as the best book in Canadian history; the Indigenous History Book Prize as the best book in Indigenous history; and the Clio Prize for Ontario as the best book in Ontario History. The book was also awarded the 2020 Floyd S. Chalmers Award as the best book in Ontario history by the Champlain Society. In 2022, Dammed was awarded the Best Book in Canadian Environmental History Prize by the Network in Canadian History and Environment.

== See also ==
- Niisaachewan Anishinaabe Nation
- Hydroelectricity in Canada
