= Robert Bothwell =

Canadian historian

Robert Bothwell CM FRSC
- Born: Robert Selkirk Bothwell; 17 August 1944 (age 82); Ottawa, Ontario, Canada

Academic background
- Education: University of Toronto; Harvard University
- Thesis: Loring Christie (1973)

Academic work
- Discipline: History
- Sub-discipline: Canadian diplomatic history; Canadian political history
- Institutions: Trinity College, Toronto
- Main interests: Canada–US relations

Robert Selkirk Bothwell CM FRSC (born August 17, 1944) is a Canadian professor of Canadian history. Bothwell is considered to be the foremost scholar on Canadian Cold War participation, as well as a frequently published author.

== Life and career ==
Bothwell was born in Ottawa, Ontario, on 17 August 1944. He completed his Bachelor of Arts degree at the University of Toronto and his Doctor of Philosophy degree at Harvard University. He was Director of the University of Toronto's international relations program at Trinity College, where he is a fellow, and is a professor of Canadian political and diplomatic history. Bothwell holds the May Gluskin Chair in Canadian History. His research interests include modern Canadian history and political, diplomatic, and military history. Bothwell is an expert on Canada–US relations.

== Selected bibliography ==
- Bothwell, Robert (1978). Pearson, His Life and World. Toronto, New York City: McGraw-Hill Ryerson. ISBN 978-0-07-082305-1. OCLC 4464045.
- C.D. Howe: A Biography, by Robert Bothwell and William Kilbourn, Toronto, (1979), McClelland and Stewart, ISBN 0-7710-4535-2.
- Eldorado: Canada's National Uranium Company (1984)
- A Short History of Ontario 1986
- Years of Victory (1987)
- Nucleus: A History of Atomic Energy of Canada Limited, Toronto, (1988), University of Toronto Press, ISBN 0-8020-2670-2.
- Loring Christie (1988)
- Laying the Foundations (1991)
- Canada & the United States (1991)
- Canada & Quebec (1995)
- The Big Chill (1998)
- The Penguin History of Canada (2006)
- Alliance and Illusion: Canada and the World, 1945-1984 (2007)
- Your Country, My Country: A Unified History of the United States and Canada (2015)

Awards
Preceded by H. V. Nelles	J. B. Tyrrell Historical Medal; 2010	Succeeded by Veronica Strong-Boag
