= States of Nature =

Book by Tina Loo

States of Nature: Conserving Canada's Wildlife in the Twentieth Century
- Author: Tina Loo
- Language: English
- Series: Nature | History | Society
- Genre: Environmental History
- Published: 2006
- Publisher: UBC Press
- Publication place: Canada
- Pages: 320
- ISBN: 9780774812894

States of Nature: Conserving Canada's Wildlife in the Twentieth Century is a 2006 book by Canadian historian Tina Loo. The book analyzes the history of nature conservation in Canada throughout the 20th century, paying particular attention to the contributions of and interactions between both state and private actors, effectively tracing "shifting and conflicting attitudes toward the natural world" and the "roles of the state, urban sportsmen, and rural peoples, from resource workers to First Nations." Loo argues that over the course of the century wildlife conservation came increasingly under the purview of the state, yet had firm roots in informal, localized practices. She highlights this expanding bureaucratic and scientific state presence as being part of a larger process of "rural colonization," but also shows how private groups and individuals continued to play an important role in adapting and implementing conservation practices. Ultimately, Loo argues that wildlife conservation was shaped by, and ultimately shaped in turn, Canadians' values about their relationship with the natural world.

== Contents ==
The opening chapters of States of Nature document the legal and practical background and changing nature of conservation in Canada, highlighting the different roles and values of various actors as the centralized state took on an increasing role, extending its bureaucratic and scientific purview over rural landscapes across the country. Loo shows that this often brought the state and rural peoples, including Indigenous peoples, into conflict, particularly as the state's conservation regime increasingly sanctioned non-consumptive use of wildlife, for example "promoting sports hunting rather than hunting for the table." This, Loo argues, "deepened the divisions of class and race," and through extending state power "conservation was an instrument of colonization." However, many groups and individuals resisted and adapted under this changing regime.

This is a major focus of the remaining chapters, which focus on case studies that highlight the various values informing conservation policy and practice throughout the period. These case studies include the career of Jack Miner, Canada's "first celebrity conservationist;" the cooperation of the Hudson's Bay Company with local Cree peoples in developing a program for beaver conservation; the emergence of population control as a central tenet of postwar conservation; lively debates about the roles of predators, including the work of Farley Mowat; and finally the development of habitat conservation through the efforts of groups like Ducks Unlimited Canada and of western Canadian outfitters.

== Awards ==
States of Nature was awarded the 2007 Sir John A. Macdonald Prize (now the CHA Best Scholarly Book in Canadian History Prize) for the best book in Canadian history from the Canadian Historical Association, and was short-listed for the Association's 2010 François-Xavier Garneau Medal. The book was also the winner of the 2008 Harold Adams Innis Prize for best English book in the Social Sciences from the Canadian Federation for the Humanities and Social Sciences.

== See also ==
- Wildlife conservation
- Wildlife of Canada
