= Robin Fisher (historian) =

Canadian historian

Robin Fisher (born 1946) is a New Zealand-born Canadian historian specialising in the history of British Columbia and First Nations–European relations. He is known for his work on Indigenous history in British Columbia and for his role in establishing the University of Northern British Columbia (UNBC).

== Education ==
Fisher was born in New Zealand in 1946 and attended Palmerston North Boys High School. He completed a Bachelor of Arts in English and History at Massey University in 1967 and a Master of Arts in History at the University of Auckland in 1969. In 1970, he emigrated to Canada to undertake a PhD at the University of British Columbia, completing his dissertation, "The Early Years of Indian-European Contact in British Columbia, 1774–1890", in 1974.

== Career ==
Fisher joined the Department of History at Simon Fraser University as assistant professor in 1974, was promoted to associate professor in 1977, and became full professor in 1983. During his time at Simon Fraser University, he taught and published in British Columbia history and organised two major international conferences on European exploration of the Pacific Ocean and the Northwest Coast of North America. He served as a member of the council of the Canadian Historical Association from 1981 to 1984, and as first chair of the editorial board and then co-editor of the Canadian Historical Review between 1982 and 1987. He was also a member of the Social Sciences and Humanities Research Council adjudication committee for research grants in history.

In 1993, Fisher accepted the position of founding chair of the history program at the University of Northern British Columbia (UNBC) in Prince George. He subsequently became Dean of Arts and Science and, in 1997, Dean of the newly formed College of Arts, Social and Health Sciences. In 2002, he joined the University of Regina as Dean of Arts, and in 2005 he became Provost and Vice-President, Academic, at Mount Royal University in Calgary.

== Research ==
Fisher's research focuses on First Nations–European relations in British Columbia and on the history of the Pacific Northwest. His first book, Contact and Conflict: Indian-European Relations in British Columbia, 1774–1890 (1977), was based on his doctoral dissertation and argued that the fur trade had brought minimal cultural change to Indigenous peoples, while the subsequent period of white settlement fundamentally altered the relationship between Indigenous and European peoples in British Columbia. The book won the John A. Macdonald Prize of the Canadian Historical Association in 1977, awarded to the work judged to have made the most significant contribution to an understanding of the Canadian past. A second edition was published in 1992. As of 2017, the book had sold over 20,000 copies, making it one of the most commercially successful single-author academic works published by UBC Press.

Fisher co-edited two volumes arising from international conferences he organised at Simon Fraser University: Captain James Cook and His Times (1979) and From Maps to Metaphors: The Pacific World of George Vancouver (1993), both co-edited with Hugh Johnston. He also published a biography of British Columbia Premier Duff Pattullo, Duff Pattullo of British Columbia (1991), which was reviewed in the Canadian Historical Review as a work of "unmistakable centrality to its theme". His biography Wilson Duff: Coming Back, A Life (2022) won the 2022 Lieutenant Governor's Medal for Historical Writing. The book was described in BC Studies as a thoroughly researched and well-written work that constitutes a "superb contribution" to the history of anthropology and museum practice in the Pacific Northwest.

== Awards ==
- John A. Macdonald Prize, Canadian Historical Association, 1977, for Contact and Conflict
- Lieutenant Governor's Medal for Historical Writing, 2022, for Wilson Duff: Coming Back, A Life

== Selected bibliography ==
- Contact and Conflict: Indian-European Relations in British Columbia, 1774–1890 (Vancouver: UBC Press, 1977; 2nd ed. 1992). ISBN 978-0-7748-0108-9
- Captain James Cook and His Times, co-edited with Hugh Johnston (Vancouver: Douglas & McIntyre, 1979).
- Duff Pattullo of British Columbia (Toronto: University of Toronto Press, 1991).
- Vancouver's Voyage: Charting the Northwest Coast, 1791–1795 (Vancouver: Douglas & McIntyre, 1992).
- From Maps to Metaphors: The Pacific World of George Vancouver, co-edited with Hugh Johnston (Vancouver: UBC Press, 1993).
- Wilson Duff: Coming Back, A Life (Vancouver: Harbour Publishing, 2022). ISBN 978-1-55017-975-0
