= Clearing the Plains =

2013 book by James Daschuk

Clearing the Plains: Disease, Politics of Starvation, and the Loss of Indigenous Life
- Author: James Daschuk
- Language: English
- Subjects: Disease; settlement; Treaties
- Genre: History; epidemiology
- Published: 2013
- Publisher: University of Regina Press
- Publication place: Canada
- Pages: 386
- Awards: Governor General's History Award; Clio Prize
- ISBN: 9780889776210

Clearing the Plains: Disease, Politics of Starvation, and the Loss of Aboriginal Life is a 2013 book by Canadian scholar James Daschuk. The book takes an epidemiological approach and documents the historical roots of modern health disparities between Canadians and Indigenous peoples living in what is now Canada. In doing so, Daschuk highlights in particular the role of Canadian policy designed to displace Indigenous populations from their traditional territories to make way for the settlement of the Prairies, including policies that amounted to forced starvation. The book implicates numerous government officials, including John A. Macdonald, Canada's first Prime Minister, in advocating for and designing such policies. Daschuk thus builds on the work of scholars such as Sarah Carter who have highlighted the shortcomings of Canadian Indigenous policies in the settlement period, along with scholarship on the social determinants of health. In an article about his research, Daschuk argued that these types of policies were part of a process of genocide and ethnic cleansing.

== Publication ==
The book is based on Daschuk's 2002 doctoral dissertation at the University of Manitoba, titled "The political economy of Indian health and disease in the Canadian northwest." Daschuk has stated that he was challenged at his PhD defense for having put together a work primarily of scholarly synthesis, and that he continued to work on adding to the manuscript for years after graduating. Ultimately, Daschuk stated that the book represented more than 20 years of work by the time it was published by the University of Regina Press in 2013.

== Contents ==
The book is effectively divided into two sections, charting developments up to and after 1870. Daschuk begins the book with an examination of the health of Indigenous populations in the prairie region prior to contact with Europeans, helping to demonstrate that those populations experienced a precipitous decline in health in the post-contact period, leading to a 'nadir of indigenous health' around 1885. While Daschuk addresses myths about the region being free of disease prior to contact, the author does highlight the absence of European diseases and provides evidence of how Indigenous populations tended to be exceptionally healthy. Much of the first section charts the spread of European epidemic diseases, including smallpox, through Indigenous populations largely through trading networks, and explores how and why particular populations were especially susceptible to such epidemics. The book also examines the devastating impact of disease on bison, which had significant cultural importance for the plains' populations and had for millennia been an important source of food. The first section of the book therefore documents the changes brought about by contact and the spread of disease, which led to significant losses in prairie Indigenous populations.

The second section of the book shifts the focus to politics as the new Canadian state embarked on Treaty negotiations with Indigenous populations and sought to open the prairie region to Canadian settlement. It is in this section that Daschuk demonstrates how Canadian officials used policy to take advantage of already decimated populations in order to restrict and control movement, which had the effect of worsening the devastation of disease and malnutrition. While the state used its power to control food rations, for example, to help force Indigenous hands in Treaty negotiations, it also turned around and failed to honour many provisions of the treaties it did negotiate and wielded tainted meat and medicine to continue to subdue populations. Daschuk highlights that such actions could not be justified even under Canadian law, arguing that this research demonstrates that "the foundation of western society is based on... illegal actions on the part of the state". Daschuk thus offers a critical assessment of the Canadian government broadly, but does not withhold judgement of specific people like Macdonald. For example, Daschuk shows evidence of Macdonald speaking in Parliament about keeping Indigenous peoples on the edge of starvation.

== Awards ==
Clearing the Plains has been highly acclaimed. The Canadian Historical Association awarded the book its 2014 Clio Prize for the best book in Canadian Prairie history. It also won four separate Saskatchewan Book Awards in 2014, including the non-fiction and scholarly writing book awards. Clearing the Plains was awarded the 2014 Governor General’s History Award for Scholarly Research as the best book in Canadian history.

== Influence ==
Clearing the Plains has been an influential book in re-assessing the treatment of Indigenous peoples in Canadian history broadly, as well as the actions of figures like Macdonald specifically. Historian Elizabeth A. Fenn, who has written extensively about colonialism and the impacts of epidemic diseases, wrote that the book "dismantles and destroys the view that Canada has a special claim to humanity in its treatment of Indigenous peoples."

The irony of Clearing the Plains winning the Canadian Historical Association's Sir John A. Macdonald Prize was widely noted given how the book exposed the role of Macdonald in the so-called politics of starvation. Daschuk became a vocal advocate of changing the prize's name as the Association engaged in conversations on the re-assessment of the namesake of the prize, established in 1977. At the 2018 annual meeting in Regina, CHA members voted overwhelmingly in favour of changing the name, re-branding the award the CHA Best Scholarly Book in Canadian History Prize.
