= Sensing Changes =

2010 book by Joy Parr

Sensing Changes: Technologies, Environments, and the Everyday, 1953–2003
- Author: Joy Parr
- Language: English
- Series: Nature | History | Society
- Subject: Megaprojects; embodied history
- Genre: Environmental History
- Published: 2010
- Publisher: UBC Press
- Publication place: Canada
- Pages: 304
- Awards: Canada Prize; Edelstein Prize
- ISBN: 9780774817233

Sensing Changes: Technologies, Environments, and the Everyday, 1953–2003 is a 2010 book by Canadian historian Joy Parr. The book examines the "embodied histories" of Canadians who were affected by Canadian megaprojects in the postwar period, assessing how such developments, which significantly altered local environments, affected people's senses of place and identity through their sensory experiences. The book features cases studies such as the damming of the Arrow Lakes in British Columbia, the relocation of the village of Iroquois as part of the Saint Lawrence Seaway project, and the construction of a NATO base in rural New Brunswick. The book also explores the E. coli outbreak that occurred in Walkerton, Ontario in 2000. Beyond just documenting the changes brought about by such developments, which were significant in remaking entire landscapes, Parr argues that these periods of sudden changes for local residents reveal important insights into embodied knowledge, or the ways in which we come to know our surroundings through sensory engagement. The book effectively demonstrates that "[t]he human body... becomes the fundamental archive of historical experience that is researchable through written and oral accounts of lived experience."

== Contents ==
Sensing Changes consists mainly of six case studies and the ways in which they affected local populations, producing disjuncture in their embodied history, or their local knowledge based on sensory experience. Parr notes that at the outset of the project her aim was more simply to chart the broad effects of megaproject development in postwar Canada, but that through her research it became clear that the modernization process enacted through such megaprojects had profound effects on the ways people sense: "the arrival and persistence of the megaprojects remade modes of dwelling and earning a living, the discernment of hazards, and the experience of pleasures at home and at work in time and place.” As such, the book goes on to demonstrate that human senses are serious sites of historical experience, and that they change over time.

Five of the book's six case studies explicitly feature megaproject development: the construction of CFB Gagetown, which displaced residents of Gagetown, New Brunswick; the development of Ontario's nuclear power industry, focusing on the Bruce Nuclear Generating Station; the Saint Lawrence Seaway Project, focusing on the relocation of the village of Iroquois, Ontario; the damming of the Columbia River and its effect on British Columbia's Arrow Lakes; and the construction of a heavy water production plant near Inverhuron Provincial Park on the shores of Lake Huron. The 6th and final case study features the outbreak of E. coli in Walkerton, Ontario. In each of the cases Parr draws extensively on oral interviews with people who were directly affected by such developments, such as local residents and nuclear plant workers.

The megaprojects explored in Sensing Changes were justified as being matters of national interest and security, and Parr highlights how therefore "inhabitants found their own needs divergent from the priorities of central planners at a time when economists and engineers, guided by professional commitments to the 'highest best use' of resources, made local needs axiomatically subsidiary to national goals." The book effectively re-asserts the importance of the local experience, and the ways in which humans inhabit and experience local spaces as habitats, even as "provincial, national, and continental politics ultimately relate to, and make demands on, individual human beings and their communities."

== Megaprojects New Media ==
To accompany the book, Parr, along with Jon van der Veen and Jessica van Horssen, also created a multimedia archive that features content related to each of the book's case studies, as well as an additional case study on the town of Asbestos, Quebec. Given that the book focuses on sensory experiences, this component of the project was designed to provide an opportunity to engage with the material in other ways than just textual, including imagery, audio clips, graphic representations, and more. It has been noted that this effort highlights how historians "can and should engage our students in multi-sensory ways and... must move beyond privileging the written word."

== Awards and recognition ==
Sensing Changes won the 2011 Canada Prize from the Canadian Federation for the Humanities and Social Sciences for exceptional contribution to Canadian scholarship and the Edelstein Prize from the Society for the History of Technology (SHOT) as the best book on the history of technology published in the preceding three years. The book was also short-listed for the Canadian Historical Association's 2015 François-Xavier Garneau Medal, which is awarded every five years to honour outstanding contributions in Canadian historical research. One historian has suggested that Sensing Changes "might be the work of Canadian history that has had the biggest effect outside of Canada since that of Harold Innis."
