= Lawrence Vankoughnet =

Canadian civil servant

Lawrence Vankoughnet was an agent with Canada's Department of Indian Affairs (DIA) in the late 19th century. Vankoughnet moved quickly up the ranks of the DIA, beginning as a clerk with family connections to prime minister John A. Macdonald. He worked jobs ranging from chief civil servant to deputy superintendent. After a 3-month sick leave for a "disordered nervous system", he returned to work. Vankoughnet was noted by many historians to be the man who cut costs on the rations the government supplied to the reserves. Despite only visiting the reserves once, where he was reluctant to socialize with the chiefs, Vankoughnet announced his change of policy plans in Battleford shortly afterwards: Indians would only be supplied with rations if they were unable to sustain themselves. Vankoughnet’s goals as deputy superintendent of the DIA was to keep costs to a minimum. He thought that so long as they were supplying reserve peoples with rations, they would remain dependent on the government and therefore a significant burden to their expenditures.

== The Department of Indian Affairs and the loss of the buffalo ==
Relationships between settlers and Indigenous populations shifted drastically around the same time that Plains bison (buffalo) populations disappeared from the plains. With the loss of the buffalo came the loss of the nomadic lifestyles of the indigenous peoples. Their freedom was not something that they could maintain. With the collapse in the 1870s being something that many were not expecting, the government’s ability to supply adequate food was insufficient. Lack of food on reserve land combined with close living conditions and widespread poverty brought on devastating illnesses, including tuberculosis. Many historians viewed TB as the main killer of early reserve populations despite its presence in populations beforehand.

The Metis, who were the offspring of white settlers and Indigenous women, lived less nomadic lives than the Indigenous people. After many fled the Red River settlement, they began setting up permanent settlements throughout the 1870s throughout the northwest.

Many forts were the result of the Catholic mission, like Fort Laurent. Lawrence Clarke, chairman of the Metis Council and fellow developer of Fort Laurent, saw the opportunity to higher eager metis workers and lower standards and wages. Laws and regulations at the Fort meant a secure supply of pemmican as buffalo populations dwindled. The Metis and Indians were hunting the same buffalo and many sensed their demise. As the decline of buffalo increased, so did the Metis and Indigenous' concern for their way of life.

When the Liberal government of Alexander Mackenzie came into power in 1873, they began to hesitantly prepare the west for settlement. With Fort Laurent on the proposed railway route, Lawrence Clarke, the Hudson's Bay Company (HBC) and the federal government authorities sought control over the buffalo and pemmican supply- wanting it out of metis hands.

In the mid 1870s, Lawrence Clarke, Metis council president Gabriel Dumont and the Metis people got into an affair which illegitimated the Fort Laurent law system, bringing the British law into power and the buffalo and pemmican into the hands of the HBC. Two bad years of wheat production caused by an early frost in 1883 and a wet summer in 1884 further aggravated those struggling for food and money on the plains.

== The Numbered Treaties: The 1870s ==
Treaties were decided orally and later finalized in writing. First Nations people saw oral words to be as binding as written words, however, the government saw what was written as the final. Mistranslations often meant that what First Nations agreed to was not what they received. In 1873, the government began changing how they approached the treaty making process. A new chief negotiator and crucial Metis intervention were beneficial for both parties.

In 1875, Treaty Six was successfully negotiated at Fort Carlton with the presence of a police force. Big Bear, a chief of the Cree people, refused to sign- worried about a hanging in the future. He was the first major chief on the Canadian Prairies to not sign. The heart of the fertile belt could now be prepared for settlers.

Cree leaders signed Treaty Six with the understanding that they would receive medical help, protection from famine and assistance converting into an agricultural lifestyle. They did not account for mistranslations in the treaty process, extinction of the bison and economic marginalization.

First Nations saw treaties as government reassurance that their way of life would be protected. The decline of the buffalo, the fur trade economy, and the increasing influx of white settlers presented a challenging and changing environment. The government saw treaties as an opportunity to get First Nations off the plains and white settlers onto the plains.

When John A. Macdonald's Conservatives took over in 1878, development in the west took off. The colonization company scheme and the creation of the Canadian Pacific Railway was seen as the key to a large influx of money. The metis were worried that they would be treated as squatters and lose the land that they were living on when settlers moved in.

At the end of the 1870s, the Conservatives temporally ended the work-for-rations program upon realizing the extent to which the famine impacted the native population after the famine conference took place in Battleford. However, Lawrence Vankoughnet, then the deputy superintendent, kept a secret agenda in place which pushed agents of the Department of Indian Affairs (DIA) to continue demanding work from Indians who could work for them to earn the food that they were receiving. This was to ensure that they did not expect gift giving form the government.

As life on the reserve continued to include starvation, malnutrition and illness, many Metis were caught sharing what little food they had. The head of the DIA between 1883 and 1893, Hayter Reed, discovered that even some of the police began sharing their rations.

Natives in northwestern Saskatchewan and Alberta who were not part of Treaty Six asked the government for assistance. Since the northern land was not suitable for agriculture, the government did not desire the land for settlement. Lawrence Vankoughnet made his point clear alongside Macdonald, in a letter written on February 22, 1890, saying that the making of a Treaty would be postponed until settlement was required.

== Dewdney, Vankoughnet and the Tension of the 1880s ==
In 1880, Edgar Dewdney was concerned that the clothes in which the people were living in was not adequate, and after much discussion, Vankougnet agreed that the Indians would be better-abled to work if they were supplied with better clothing.

Following his trip to the west in the early 1880s, Vankoughnet cut $140,000 headed for the prairies. He stated that the staff of the Indian administration were corrupt and employee termination was required to prevent further discrepancies. When the prime minister heard this from Vankoughnet, he insisted that immediate termination should be completed without excuses. Dewdney was not consulted before this decision was made and tension between Vankoughnet and Dewdney grew.

In 1882, the police resisted the closer of Fort Walsh because they feared that it would prolong and worsen the famine. When Lawrence told the prime minister that tighter control of the police would prevent them from acting on their own accord, the police argued that they wanted to be on good terms with the Indians. In 1884, the police force was taken under control by the Department of Indian Affairs- hence marking a major shift in the relationship between the police and the northwest aboriginals.

In August 1883, an island in Indonesia called Krakatoa exploded at such a magnitude that shifts in weather patterns were felt globally. As summer turned to fall, unexpected frost destroyed crops across the prairies. Hunger broke out and illness moved in as populations were weakened from growing famine. The loss of crops not only meant hunger and illness, but a season’s worth of agricultural economy was also lost. After the time of the frost, prime minister Macdonald wrote to Dewdney asking for reports on reserve settlement progress. The DIA file was subject to a Parliament session the coming winter and Macdonald was worried about the effects a bad report may bring.

Dewdney recognized his Conservative leader's concern and managed to keep the report in a positive light, describing the progress of Indians as "satisfactory" and mentioning that the government had been able to lessen the number of flour rations given out.

Despite Dewdney’s service to the prime minister, he recognized the reserve situation and the impractical path Vankoughnet was leading. He wrote a letter to Macdonald voicing his concerns. Without consulting with Dewdney beforehand, Vankoughnet ordered additional cuts, explaining to Dewdney that the "country" expected expenditure cuts and failing to do so would result in consequences within the department.

Around 1883, the government began depending on bacon as the bulk of reserve rations. Due to lack of proper preservation and storage, the bacon was difficult to digest and often arrived on reserves spoiled. The spoiled bacon was fatal when ingested and the Assiniboine bands of Indian Head experienced a great tragedy in 1883 when nearly 130 people died from the rancid rations. Cree leaders Lucky Man, Big Bear and Little Pine, accompanied by thousands of followers, left their reserves to take up land around Fort Walsh in Cypress Hills, despite knowing they would receive no government help due to their unsanctioned departure.

Upon the closure of Fort Walsh shortly after the Cree leaders arrived, it was planned that a Treaty 4 chief council would be held to discuss reserve conditions. The DIA refused to supply the council with rations and the Cree leaders cancelled the gathering.

To add to the heightening concern, Dewdney received a 2-month leave in February 1884- giving Vankoughnet full control of the department. Furthering restraints on department expenditures saw a rise in tensions throughout the west. Several small-scale confrontations occurred, with the most significant taking place on the Sakimay (Yellow Calf) reserve in the Qu’Appelle Valley. Vankoughnet’s orders to cut reckless spending employees saw the end of farming instructor James Setter’s career. When Setter was replaced with an inexperienced man by the name of Hilton Keith, an armed stand-off took place, which is known as the Yellow Calf Incident. 5 weeks after Setter’s replacement, Chief Sakimay and several armed men raided the ration storehouse in which Keith was guarding and stole sixty bags of flour and twelve containers of bacon. Led by hunger and frustration, Assistant Commissioner Reed reasoned that the rations were on the reserve for the Indians to eat, regardless of when they ate it. Back in Ottawa, Vankoughnet heard of the trouble and warned police of potential storehouse raids.

In April 1884, Dewdney returned to more frustrations than he left with due to Vanoughnet’s new orders. By the time the summer came around, treaty populations were experiencing bad climate, lack of small game and department dismissals. After meeting with Cree leaders, Dewdney aimed to repair Vankoughnet’s damage by raising ration expenditures by $17,000 despite warning of Parliament criticism.

== Big Bear and the Metis Rebellion of 1885 ==
The Metis rebellion was the product of years of frustration. Historians describe it as a clash of cultures and an expression of metis nationalism. The loss of the buffalo and agricultural failures meant a struggle for food, health, and economic survival.

Big Bear was a big influence on the plains people. He encouraged united peace and defiance by leaving reserve lands and travelling as a group. Off reserve land, they received no rations from the government. In 1884, he organized a thirst dance at Battleford. A thirst dance was a traditional spiritual festival which involved a gathering of many Indian bands together. The government became aware of the Indian mobilization and Hayter Reed, along with the DIA and police force were present- nearly avoiding bloody confrontation. Shortly after the Thirst Dance at Battleford, Big Bear’s son and Indian chief Wandering Spirit got caught up in a fight with incomers and blood was shed against Big Bear’s wishes. The men were arrested, along with Big Bear, despite his plea for peaceful protest.

Since Big Bear was not directly involved with the killings, he was tried for treason and remained in prison for nearly a year. His head was shaved, he was taught carpentry and was baptized. Big Bear was released due to poor health and died a year later.

The spring of 1885 saw a series of what many historians describe as "isolated and sporadic events". Cree violence was aimed at agents who acted beyond their granted authority. Metis populations also began their insurrection in the east. Dominion authorities began their hunt for the Cree leaders responsible for the killings in the summer of 1885. They were found by troopers, starving, and were sentenced to death in Battleford. Dewdney and Reed insisted that the hangings were public and hence the end of the Cree resistance was marked.

What started as a peaceful protest ended in a two-week military campaign and a loss of negotiable treaties. Louis Riel and his metis followers tried unsuccessfully to rouse Indigenous peoples and angry settlers together against the government and form their own provisional government, with Riel as the leader. Commencing on March 19, the battle of Batoche was brief. The Metis were outnumbered and under armed. The result saw the execution of Louis Riel- who was tried for treason- and stricter regulations and policy in place to control the metis and Indigenous peoples in the years to follow.
