= Sarah Carter (historian) =

Canadian historian

Sarah Alexandra Carter CM FRSC is a Canadian historian. She is a Professor Emeritus and the former Henry Marshall Tory Chair at the University of Alberta in both the Department of History and Classics and the Faculty of Native Studies with noted specialties in Indigenous and women's history.

== Career and honours ==
Carter grew up in Saskatoon, Saskatchewan. As a student, she worked summer jobs at the historic sites of Fort Walsh and Fort Battleford. Carter has related that the exclusion of colonial history at such sites was a motivating factor in her pursuing further studies in history. She received her Bachelor of Arts in 1976 and her Master of Arts in 1981, both from the University of Saskatchewan, and her PhD from the University of Manitoba in 1987. Before joining the University of Alberta in 2006, Carter had taught at the University of Calgary, the University of Winnipeg, and the University of Manitoba.

Carter's research, from her doctoral dissertation that became her first book, Lost Harvests, has focused on Western Canada's colonial history, and in particular the exclusion of Indigenous peoples and women throughout colonization and settlement of the Prairies. Her work has been recognized as fundamentally re-shaping historical understandings of the Prairies. For instance, her research into Canada's Peasant Farm Policy challenged long-standing views of farming on reserves, while her research on women and homesteading documented how early agricultural policy on the Canadian Prairies both extended Canadian colonial power and limited the political and economic power of women. Her work has also been influential beyond academia. For example, her research was important to the writing of the final report of the National Inquiry into Missing and Murdered Indigenous Women.

Carter has won numerous accolades throughout her career. Lost Harvests won the 1991 Clio Prize for the Prairies from the Canadian Historical Association, as did her 2008 book The Importance of Being Monogamous and her 2016 book Imperial Plots. The latter also won the Association's 2017 Sir John A. Macdonald Prize (now the CHA Best Scholarly Book in Canadian History Prize), one of the Governor General's History Awards, awarded to the book making the most significant contribution to Canadian history. In 2020, she was awarded a Killam Prize from the Canada Council, which recognizes substantial and distinguished contributions over a significant period to Canadian scholarly research. In June 2023, Carter was appointed as a Member of the Order of Canada, recognized for her "pioneering" historical and academic work.

Carter contributed an introduction to the 2006 edition of the 1914 book Wheat and Woman by Georgina Binnie-Clark, a figure she also wrote about in Imperial Plots.

== Selected works ==
- Lost Harvests: Prairie Indian Reserve Farmers and Government Policy. McGill-Queen's Press, 1990.
- The True Spirit and Original Intent of Treaty 7. With Treaty 7 Tribal Council, Walter Hildebrandt, and Dorothy First Rider. McGill-Queen's Press, 1996.
- Capturing Women: The Manipulation of Cultural Imagery in Canada's Prairie West. McGill-Queen's Press, 1997.
- Aboriginal People and Colonizers of Western Canada. University of Toronto Press, 1999.
- The Importance of Being Monogamous: Marriage and Nation Building in Western Canada. Athabasca University Press and University of Alberta Press, 2008.
- Imperial Plots: Women, Land, and the Spadework of British Colonialism on the Canadian Prairies. University of Manitoba Press, 2016.
