= Veronica Strong-Boag =

Canadian historian

Veronica Strong-Boag CM FRSC
- Born: 1947 (age 78–79); Prestwick, Scotland

Academic background
- Education: University of Toronto; Carleton University
- Thesis: The Parliament of Women (1975)
- Doctoral advisor: Michael Bliss

Academic work
- Discipline: History
- Sub-discipline: Canadian history; history of childhood; women's history
- School or tradition: Feminism
- Institutions: University of British Columbia

Veronica Jane Strong-Boag CM FRSC (born 1947 in Prestwick, Scotland) is a Canadian historian specializing in the history of women and children in Canada. She is a Professor Emerita at the University of British Columbia, where she was Professor of Women's History and the founding Director of the Centre for Women’s and Gender Studies.

== Career and honours ==
Strong-Boag obtained her BA in History from the University of Toronto in 1970, her MA from Carleton University in 1971, and her PhD from the University of Toronto in 1975. Her PhD thesis, completed under the supervision of Michael Bliss, was subsequently published as The Parliament of Women. In addition to UBC, she has served as a faculty member at Trent University in Peterborough, Ontario, Concordia University in Montreal, and Simon Fraser University in Vancouver. She served as president of the Canadian Historical Association from 1993 to 1994. Strong-Boag is the director of the advocacy website womensuffrage.org.

Strong-Boag has been awarded numerous accolades throughout her career. In 1988 she won the Sir John A. Macdonald Award (now the CHA Best Scholarly Book in Canadian History Prize) for her study of the lives of women in Canada between the wars, entitled The New Day Recalled. She was elected a Fellow of the Royal Society of Canada in 2001 and in July 2012 she became the second woman to be awarded the society's J. B. Tyrrell Historical Medal "for outstanding work in the history of Canada." In 2019 Strong-Boag was appointed a member of the Order of Canada, with her citation recognizing her as "one of the great trailblazers in the field of Canadian history" whose "professional leadership and her groundbreaking research have made her a key figure in recognizing feminist history in Canada and abroad." She received an honorary doctorate from the University of Guelph in October 2018.

== Selected bibliography ==
- The Parliament of Women: The National Council of Women of Canada, 1893-1929 (Ottawa: National Museum, 1976)
- The New Day Recalled: Lives of Girls and Women in English Canada 1919-1939 (Toronto: Copp, Clark, Pitman and Penguin Books, 1988)
- A History of the Canadian Peoples, Volume 2: 1867 to the Present, with Margaret Conrad and Alvin Finkel (Toronto: Copp Clark Pitman, 1993)
- "Contested Space: The Politics of Canadian Memory." Journal of the Canadian Historical Association 5 (1): 3-17. 1994
- ‘Janey Canuck’: Women in Canada Between Two World Wars, 1919-1939 (CHA Historical Booklet, 1994)
- Paddling Her Own Canoe: The Times and Texts of E. Pauline Johnson (Tekahionwake), with Carole Gerson (Toronto: University of Toronto Press, 2000)
- Finding Families, Finding Ourselves: English Canada Confronts Adoption from the 19th Century to the 1990s (Toronto: Oxford University Press, 2006)
- Fostering Nation? Canada Confronts Its History of Childhood Disadvantage (Waterloo: Wilfrid Laurier University Press, 2010)
- Liberal Hearts and Coronets: The Lives and Times of Ishbel Marjoribanks Gordon and John Campbell Gordon, the Aberdeens (Toronto: University of Toronto Press, 2015)

Professional and academic associations
Preceded by Philip Buckner	President of the Canadian Historical Association; 1993–1994	Succeeded by James A. Leith
Awards
Preceded by Robert Bothwell	J. B. Tyrrell Historical Medal; 2012	Succeeded by Gerald Friesen
