= Shirley Tillotson =

Canadian historian

Shirley Tillotson is a Canadian historian, who studies the relationship between Canadians and the Canadian state in the 20th century, and has published widely on the history of taxation in Canada. She is currently a professor emeritus at University of King's College. Her published work has won several awards, including the Governor General's History Award for Scholarly Research, François-Xavier Garneau Medal, and the Canadian Historical Association, Clio (Ontario) Award for Excellence.

== Education ==
Tillotson completed her undergraduate training at the University of Waterloo, and did her Masters' and Ph.D. from Queen's University, Canada.

== Career ==
Tillotson is currently Professor emeritus and Inglis Professor at the University of King's College, where she is teaching the history of taxation in Canada, as well as the regulation of broadcasting in Canada in the 1900s. Tillotson's book, published in 2000, The Public at Play: Gender and the Politics of Recreation in Postwar Ontario is an influential study of post-war Canada, and was described in a review published by the Canadian Historical Review as "...a welcome and worthwhile contribution to our growing appreciation for the complexities and contradictions that shaped the postwar period." It won the Canadian Historical Association's Clio (Ontario) Award for Excellence in that same year.

Her second book, Contributing Citizens: Modern Charitable Fundraising and the Making of the Welfare State,1920-66, published in 2008, was shortlisted for the Sir John A. Macdonald Prize and the Harold Adams Innis Prize in the same year.

In 2017, Tillotson published Give and Take: The Citizen-Taxpayer and the Rise of Canadian Democracy. This book won the François-Xavier Garneau Medal, and was praised by the jury as "a major contribution to the historiography of contemporary Canada." The book was widely and positively reviewed, with the Canadian Historical Review describing it as "...amazingly well researched," It was also short-listed for the Awards to Scholarly Publications Programs Book Prize in Humanities and Social Sciences from the Canadian Federation of Humanities and Social Sciences. It also won the 2019 Governor General's History Award for Scholarly Research.

== Awards ==
- 2000: Canadian Historical Association's Clio (Ontario) Award for Excellence for The Public at Play: Gender and the Politics of Recreation in Postwar Ontario.
- 2008: Shortlist, Sir John A. Macdonald Prize, for Contributing Citizens: Modern Charitable Fundraising and the Making of the Welfare State,1920-66.
- 2008: Shortlist, Harold Adams Innis Prize, for Contributing Citizens: Modern Charitable Fundraising and the Making of the Welfare State,1920-66.
- 2017: François-Xavier Garneau Medal for Give and Take: The Citizen-Taxpayer and the Rise of Canadian Democracy.
- 2019: Governor General's History Award for Scholarly Research for Give and Take: The Citizen-Taxpayer and the Rise of Canadian Democracy.

== Publications ==
- (2000) The Public at Play: Gender and the Politics of Recreation in Postwar Ontario ISBN 0-802-04730-0
- (2008) Contributing Citizens: Modern Charitable Fundraising and the Making of the Welfare State,1920-66 (2008) ISBN 1-282-45734-9
- (2017) Give and Take: The Citizen-Taxpayer and the Rise of Canadian Democracy. ISBN 0-774-83672-5
