= Joy Parr =

Canadian historian (1949–2024)

Joy Parr FRSC
- Born: 1949; Toronto, Ontario, Canada
- Died: May 12, 2024 (aged 74–75); Southampton, Ontario, Canada
- Awards: Sir John A. Macdonald Prize (1991); François-Xavier Garneau Medal (1995); J. B. Tyrrell Historical Medal (2000)

Academic background
- Education: McGill University; Yale University

Academic work
- Discipline: History
- Sub-discipline: Labour history; Gender history; History of technology
- Institutions: University of Western Ontario; Simon Fraser University; Queen's University

Joy Parr FRSC (1949 – 12 May 2024) was a Canadian historian. She was a professor at the University of Western Ontario and held a Tier 1 Canada Research Chair in Technology, Culture and Risk. She was known for her work in the fields of labour and gender history as well as the history of technology.

== Life and career ==
Parr was born in 1949 in Toronto, Ontario, and received her Bachelor of Arts degree from McGill University in 1971 before moving on to graduate school at Yale University, where she received her PhD in 1977 under the supervision of Robin W. Winks. She has taught at several institutions in both Canada and the United States, including Yale, Queen's University, the University of British Columbia, and Simon Fraser University.

Parr died in Southampton, Ontario on May 12, 2024.

== Awards ==
Parr won numerous awards and distinctions over the course of her career. She was elected a Fellow of the Royal Society of Canada in 1992, and in 2000 became the first woman to win the Society's prestigious J. B. Tyrell Historical Medal for outstanding work in the history of Canada. She was the recipient of the 1991 Sir John A. Macdonald Prize (now the CHA Best Scholarly Book in Canadian History Prize) for the best book in Canadian history from the Canadian Historical Association for her book The Gender of Breadwinners, which also won the Association's 1995 François-Xavier Garneau Medal. Her 2010 book Sensing Changes was awarded both the Canada Prize from the Canadian Federation for the Humanities and Social Sciences and the Edelstein Prize from the Society for the History of Technology (SHOT). In 2018, SHOT awarded Parr the Leonardo da Vinci Medal for lifetime achievement, noting that "Parr has played an important role in redefining the field of history of technology internationally, in inspiring a younger generation to engage with the field, and in building a vibrant community in Canada and beyond." Parr is also the namesake for the Joy Parr Envirotech Travel Award from SHOT.

== Selected works ==
- Labouring Children: British Immigrant Apprentices to Canada, 1869-1924. McGill-Queens University Press. 1980. ISBN 978-0-85664-898-4.
- The Gender of Breadwinners: Women, Men, and Change in Two Industrial Towns, 1880-1950. University of Toronto Press. 1990. ISBN 978-0-8020-6760-9.
- Parr, Joy (September 1995). "Gender history and historical practice". Canadian Historical Review. 76 (3): 354–376. doi:10.3138/CHR-076-03-03. S2CID 162448329.
- A Diversity of Women: Ontario, 1945-1980. University of Toronto Press. 1995. ISBN 978-0-8020-2615-6.
- Parr, Joy (January 1997). "What makes washday less blue? Gender, nation, and technology choice in postwar Canada". Technology and Culture. 38 (1): 153–186. doi:10.2307/3106787. JSTOR 3106787. S2CID 147539838.
- Parr, Joy (1999). Domestic Goods: The Material, the Moral, and the Economic in the Postwar Years. University of Toronto Press. ISBN 978-0-8020-4097-8.
- Sensing Changes: Technologies, Environments, and the Everyday, 1953-2003. UBC Press. 2010. ISBN 978-0-7748-1723-3.
