= Serpent River Resurgence =

2022 non-fiction book by Lianne C. Leddy

Serpent River Resurgence: Confronting Uranium Mining at Elliot Lake
- Author: Lianne C. Leddy
- Language: English
- Subject: Uranium mining; Indigenous rights
- Genre: Indigenous history; Environmental history
- Published: 2022
- Publisher: University of Toronto Press
- Publication place: Canada
- Media type: Print
- Pages: 248
- Awards: CHA Best Scholarly Book in Canadian History Prize
- ISBN: 9781442614376

Serpent River Resurgence: Confronting Uranium Mining at Elliot Lake is a 2022 book by Lianne C. Leddy, Associate Professor of History at Wilfrid Laurier University. The book documents the environmental history of uranium mining at Elliot Lake, Ontario, on Serpent River First Nation, including the advocacy of the Serpent River Anishinaabe to raise awareness about mining impacts on the community. Leddy grew up in Elliot Lake and is a member of Serpent River First Nation.

== Contents ==
Serpent River Resurgence characterizes the uranium industry at Elliot Lake as a form of "Cold War colonialism," given the connection between mining in the area and American nuclear weapons production and the impacts of the industry on the Serpent River First Nation. The main impacts that the book focuses on are those on the Serpent River watershed and those of a sulphuric acid production plant located on the Serpent River reserve. In addition to elucidating the impacts of the uranium industry on the local environment, the book documents the efforts of Serpent River residents, including elders, to be heard by government and industry officials. The book highlights how community members were not opposed to economic development, but resisted both the environmental consequences of the uranium industry and the colonial decision-making structures that enabled that development.

In the book, Leddy draws on extensive archival material, evidence from newspapers, and Indigenous oral history research with Elders from the Serpent River community.

== Awards ==
Serpent River Resurgence won three awards from the Canadian Historical Association in 2023: the CHA Best Scholarly Book in Canadian History Prize as the best book in Canadian history; the Clio Prize for Ontario as the best book in Ontario History; and the Indigenous History Book Prize as the best book in Indigenous history, which was co-won by Annette W. de Stecher for the book Wendat Women’s Arts.

== See also ==
- Serpent River First Nation
- Elliot Lake
- Uranium mining in the Elliot Lake area
