= John C. Weaver (historian) =

Canadian historian

John C. Weaver FRSC is a Canadian historian, and Distinguished University Professor at McMaster University.

== Early life and education ==
Weaver's undergraduate studies were at Queen's University at Kingston. His PhD was at Duke University and was funded by a James B. Duke Commonwealth Fellowship.

== Career ==
Except for a two year period teaching at Queen's, his career has been entirely at McMaster University, with visiting Professorships at Australian National University and Griffith University in Brisbane.

The Great Land Rush and the Making of the Modern World (McGill-Queen's University Press, 2003) was awarded the François-Xavier Garneau Medal, Best Book in History during the previous five years by a Canadian, the North American Conference on British Studies Award for Best Book 2005, and the Wallace K. Ferguson Award, best book in a non-Canadian field by the Canadian Historical Association.

== Books ==
- Adam Smith’s Islands: New Zealand’s Incomparable Restructuring, 1980–1995 (Montreal: McGill-Queen's University Press, 2025).
- Sorrows of the Century: Interpreting Suicide in New Zealand, 1900-2000 (Montreal: McGill-Queen's University Press, 2013). New Zealand paperback edition published by Bridget Williams Books in a co-publication with MQUP, 2014.
- A Sadly Troubled History: The Meanings of Suicide in the Modern Age (Montreal: McGill-Queen's University Press, 2009)
- The Great Land Rush and the Making of the Modern World, 1650-1900 (Montreal: McGill-Queen's University Press, 2006).
  - French edition: La roué vers la terre et le faconnement du monde moderne, 1650- 1900 (Montreal: Editions Fides, 2006), Translation by Christine Ayoub.
- Crimes, Constables, and Courts: Order and Transgression in a Canadian City, 1816-1970 (Montreal: McGill-Queen's University Press, 1995).
- With Michael Doucet, Housing the North American City (Montreal: McGill-Queen's Press, 1991).
- Hamilton: An Illustrated History (Toronto: National Museum of Canada and James Lorimer and Company, 1982).
