= Georgina Binnie-Clark =

British and Canadian lecturer, author and social activist

- Born: April 25, 1871; Dorset, England
- Died: April 22, 1947 (aged 75); London, England
- Occupations: Farmer; writer
- Notable work: "Wheat and Woman"

Georgina Binnie-Clark (April 25, 1871 - April 22, 1947) was a British farmer, lecturer and author, who became an ardent supporter of female farmers in prairie Canada.

== Life ==
Binnie-Clark was born in Dorset, England, on April 25, 1871. As a young woman, she impetuously purchased 320 acres of land in the Qu'Appelle Valley of Saskatchewan in 1905. Because she was a woman, she was not eligible for a free quarter-section of land from the Canadian government. However, through bank loans, she was able to purchase land. A single, upper-middle class Englishwoman, Binnie-Clark represented the new generation of female farmers who were not widows or daughters of farmers, but who selected farming as a profession that would provide them with income and independence.

== Farming advocacy ==
Binnie-Clark tirelessly advocated for the female right to cultivate the land. She aligned herself with a group of women "who were fighting out the battle of our Empire with the pick and the spade on unbroken soil."

She began to gain widespread attention and acknowledgement in 1908, when she published several articles in the Canadian Gazette that encouraged others to follow her lead, and move to the West. Binnie-Clark, perturbed by the inequality of land grants and the inaccessibility of land for women (unless they were widowed), drew upon her linguistic talents in an attempt to convince the government that women could perform tasks outside of what was typically thought of as appropriately feminine. She believed in the ability of women to sew the seeds of the British Empire in the New World. Although she pursued an occupation that was considered exclusively male, she maintained her femininity in her public life. She taught agricultural skills to young women on her farm, as well as published works and spoke publicly about the benefits of planting imperial seeds through working the land. She believed in the unique position and ability of British women to "play a critical role in the 'spade-work of British expansion."

Eventually, she published two books entitled A Summer on the Canadian Prairie (1910) and Wheat and Woman (1914). The latter work summarized content from her speeches and previous publications, as well as including anecdotes from her early years of working the land. Her autobiographical works are full of details of her life in prairie Canada. She describes "the social life and customs, material culture, local politics, and the rhythm of daily farm life."

She worked from both Saskatchewan and England, serving as a bridge between the Crown and its colony. With the outbreak of the First World War, she returned to England, where she managed crews of female agricultural workers in the Yorkshire and Lincolnshire districts. After the war, when her brother, also a farmer in Saskatchewan died, Binnie-Clark resumed her life on the Canadian prairies. After 1921, she shared the responsibility of farming with her sister. By 1930 the two women managed 275 acres. However, in 1936, Binnie-Clark returned to England, where she remained until her death.

Decades later, Binnie-Clark is remembered as the fiercest advocate of the farming profession for British women at the turn of the century. She died on April 22, 1947, in London, England.

== Bibliography ==
- Binnie-Clark, Georgina (2011). A summer on the Canadian prairie (reprint, 1923 ed.). [Charleston, SC?]: Nabu Press. ISBN 9781178028485. OCLC 738353735.
