= Hayter Reed =

Canadian politician (1849–1936)

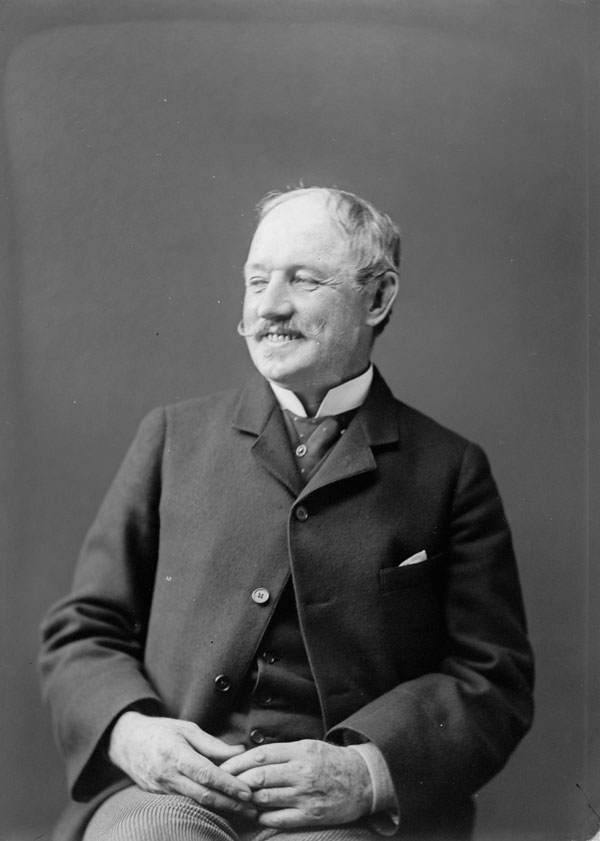

Member of the Council of the Northwest Territories
- In office August 13, 1883 – August 12, 1885

Personal details
- Born: May 26, 1849 L'Orignal, Canada West
- Died: December 21, 1936 (aged 87) Montreal, Quebec
- Party: Independent
- Occupation: lawyer, indian commissioner

Hayter Reed (May 26, 1849 – December 21, 1936) was a Canadian politician. He served on the 1st Council of the Northwest Territories.

== Early life ==
=== Birth ===
Hayter Reed was born in L'Orignal, Canada West, on 26 May 1849. His father was George Decimus Reed, an immigrant from Surrey, England, a registrar for the United Counties of Prescott and Russell, who had married Hayter's mother, Harriet McKay, a Canadian born. Hayter Reed was one of two children; he had a sister named Louisa Reed.

=== Family ===
After Harriet McKay left George Decimus Reed, she travelled to the United States to live with her family. Harriet McKay took Louisa with her and left Hayter Reed with George Decimus Reed's sister's family, the Drapers. Thereafter George Decimus Reed died and Harriet McKay firmly eschewed any personal correspondence with Hayter Reed.

Little else is known about George Decimus Reed, Harriet McKay, and Louisa Reed.

=== Education ===
With the support of his aunt and uncle, Hayter Reed attended Upper Canada College and the Model Grammar School in Toronto and thereafter attended the School of Military Instruction in Kingston, Canada West.

== Career ==
=== Military service ===
Having graduated in 1865, Hayter Reed aligned himself with the military service of Canada. On 15 June 1866, he joined the 14th Battalion Volunteer Militia Rifles, Canada, and immediately thereafter he was appointed drill instructor. In 1868, he was elected adjutant and later captain with that corps and successfully assumed each position until his next commission in 1870 as a brigade major. In 1871, Reed was transferred to Fort Garry where he assumed garrison duties along with the troops stationed there and remained until its disbandment in 1878.

=== Legal service ===
During that time, he studied law and was subsequently called to the Manitoba Bar in 1871. In 1879, Hayter Reed served as a notary public in Prince Albert, North-West Territories.

=== Civil service ===
In April 1880, Hayter Reed was commissioned by the Department of the Interior as chief land guide in Winnipeg; he was responsible for the distribution of both immigrants and settlers with the aid of several agencies throughout Canada. Immediately thereafter, the Department of the Interior issued a request to fill several vacant positions within their Indian Affairs Branch and in February 1881, Reed was appointed Indian agent in Battleford, North-West Territories. In March 1881, Edgar Dewdney (then Commissioner of Indian Affairs) sought to settle Canada's Indigenous population on reserves. Accordingly, in 1882, Dewdney instructed Reed (then appointed to the North-West Territorial Council) minimize the expenditure of funds by (1) restricting the amount of food supplied to the reserves inhabited by Indigenous peoples (flour, bacon or beef and excluding luxury goods such as tea, sugar and tobacco) and (2) demanding manual labour from the Indigenous peoples as recompense. The primary aim of the Department of the Interior was to achieve agricultural discipline. Reed was expected to reduce costs and to ensure smooth farming operations by dint of supervision (of instructors and employees) over the First Nations reserves. In 1883, Reed was appointed secretary of the North-West Territorial Council and later appointed acting assistant Indian commissioner. In 1884, in Dewdney's absence, he acted as the administrator of the North-West Council. He was later appointed assistant Indian commissioner and moved to Regina, Assiniboia. In 1888, Reed was appointed commission of Indian affairs and after Dewdney's promotion to minister of the interior in 1893, Reed was appointed deputy superintendent general of Indian affairs (and it was his final commission).

He was deputy superintendent general of Indian affairs, until his dismissal by Interior Secretary Clifford Sifton in 1897.

Reed is responsible for purposely hindering flourishing Indigenous economic agricultural development in the plains through the Peasant Farming Policy, which aimed to push Indigenous peoples to the socioeconomic positions of peasants. Using his position as deputy superintendent general, Reed implemented a policy which restricted indigenous peoples from using modern farming equipment. As head of the Indian Affairs Department, Reed was also instrumental in implementing a pass system which restricted Indigenous people from leaving their reserves without a temporary certificate from a government agent. He later overruled the North-West Mounted Police, who wanted to abolish the policy, but acknowledged in 1893 that the pass system was not grounded in law. In 1882, Reed was appointed as a member of the North-West Territorial Council; during his time on the council he filled in for the lieutenant governor in his absence. He lived in Regina. He served on the council until 1888, and later worked for Canadian Pacific Railway hotels. He died in 1936.
