= J. M. Beattie =

British legal historian (1932–2017)

John Maurice Beattie (1932 – 12 July 2017) was a British legal historian.

He was born in Dunston near Newcastle upon Tyne, England and studied history at the University of San Francisco. He was awarded a master's degree by the University of California and a PhD by King's College, Cambridge, where his supervisor was John H. Plumb. Beattie was appointed to the University of Toronto's Department of History in 1961, where he was a member for 35 years.

His Crime and the Courts in England, 1660-1800 is considered a seminal work in criminal and legal history.

== Works ==
- 'The Court of George I and English Politics, 1717-1720', The English Historical Review, Vol. 81, No. 318 (Jan., 1966), pp. 26–37.
- The English Court in the Reign of George I (Cambridge: Cambridge University Press, 1967).
- 'The Pattern of Crime in England 1660-1800', Past & Present, No. 62 (Feb., 1974), pp. 47–95.
- 'The Criminality of Women in Eighteenth-Century England', Journal of Social History, Vol. 8, No. 4 (Summer, 1975), pp. 80–116.
- Crime and the Courts in England, 1660-1800 (Princeton: Princeton University Press, 1986).
- 'Scales of Justice: Defense Counsel and the English Criminal Trial in the Eighteenth and Nineteenth Centuries', Law and History Review, Vol. 9, No. 2 (Autumn, 1991), pp. 221–267.
- Policing and Punishment in London 1660-1750: Urban Crime and the Limits of Terror (Oxford: Oxford University Press, 2001).
- 'Sir John Fielding and Public Justice: The Bow Street Magistrates' Court, 1754-1780', Law and History Review, Vol. 25, No. 1 (Spring, 2007), pp. 61–10.
- The First English Detectives: The Bow Street Runners and the Policing of London, 1750-1840 (Oxford: Oxford University Press, 2012).
