= Indian agent (Canada) =

Canadian colonial official supervising Indigenous peoples

From 1755 to 1830, an Indian agent was a representative of the British Indian Department in British North America.

From the 1830s (beginning in what was then so-called "Lower Canada") until the 1960s, an Indian agent was the Canadian government's representative on First Nations reserves. The British involvement ended in 1860 when Indigenous affairs were whole Canadian responsibility. While Indian agents have received some scholarly attention, the role of the Indian agent in Canadian history has never been comprehensively documented, and today the position no longer exists.

The position of Indian agent was established in the early 1870s. Indian agents were responsible for implementing government policy on reserves, enforcing and administering the provisions of the Indian Act, and managing the day-to-day affairs of First Nations people.

An Indian agent was the chief administrator for Indian affairs in their respective districts, although the title now is largely in disuse in preference to "government agent". The powers of the Indian agent held sway over the lives of all First Nations peoples in their jurisdictions. Both Indian Act and government agent duties were fused in the original colonial title of gold commissioner, which encompassed both agencies as well as the duties of magistrate, policeman, coroner and surveyor.

Under the pass system in place from 1885 until World War II, a Status Indian was not allowed to leave their Indian reserve without a pass signed by the Indian agent and could be arrested if found off reserve without a pass or with a pass that had expired.

Notable Indian agents in Canada included Henry Ross Halpin, Ebenezer McColl, and Alexander McKee.

In 1969, First Nations peoples overwhelming rejected a government policy paper called the White Paper, which called for erasing the legal distinctions between First Nations people and others in Canada by repealing the Indian Act. First Nations people did not want to be assimilated, and they also disliked the paternalistic way they were being treated by the government. As a result, the government began to slowly change its approach, including by withdrawing all Indian agents from reserves.

This title Indian agent was also used in the United States in the 19th and early 20th centuries for individuals authorized to interact with Native American tribes on behalf of the U.S. government; see Indian agent.

== See also ==
- Indian and Northern Affairs Canada
- Royal Commission on Aboriginal Peoples
- Congress of Aboriginal Peoples
- The Canadian Crown and First Nations, Inuit and Métis
