= Bettina Bradbury =

New Zealand Canadian historian

Bettina Bradbury FRSC
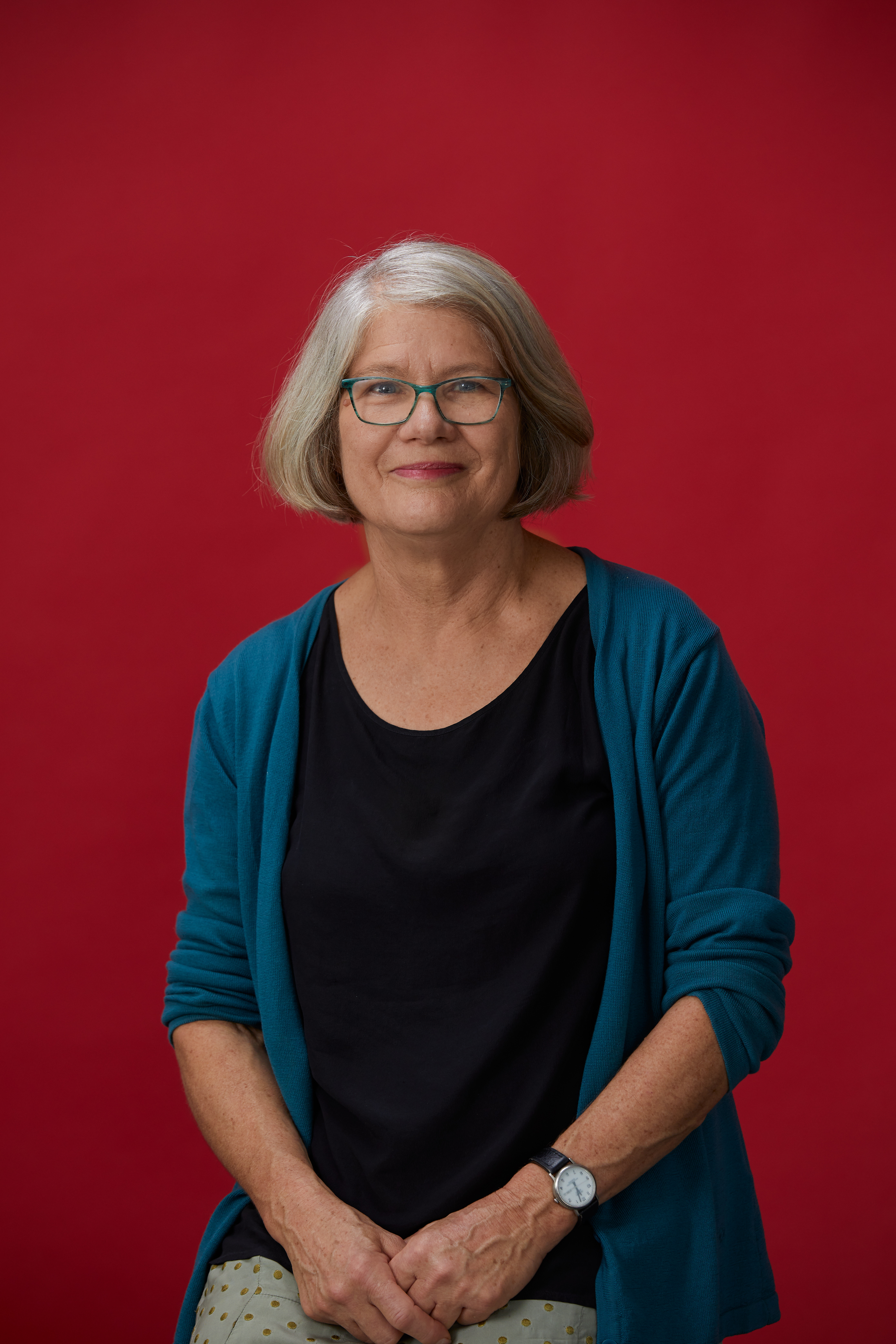
- Born: 1949 (age 76–77)

Academic background
- Education: Victoria University of Wellington (BA); Simon Fraser University (MA); Concordia University (PhD)
- Thesis: The working class family economy : Montréal, 1861-1881 (1984)

Academic work
- Discipline: History and Gender Studies
- Institutions: York University

Bettina Bradbury FRSC (born 1949) is a professor emerita in the Department of History and Gender Studies at York University and a fellow of the Royal Society of Canada. She is also the author of numerous history books.

In 2012, she was awarded the Prix Lionel Groulx – Fondation Yves-Saint-Germain Prize and Clio-Québec Prize from the Canadian Historical Association (CHA) for her book Wife to Widow. Lives, Laws and Politics in 19th century Montreal. She was also awarded the François-Xavier Garneau Medal by the CHA and shortlisted for the Canada Prize in Social Sciences.

== Education ==
Bradbury earned her Bachelor of Arts in sociology and English at the Victoria University of Wellington before earning her master's degree in history at Simon Fraser University. From there, she earned her PhD at Concordia University.

== Career ==
From 1989 to 1991, Bradbury worked as the history director of graduate studies at the Université de Montréal. Since the 1980s, Bradbury has been a member of the Montreal History Group. It was through her activity with this group that she wrote Working Families: Age, Gender, and Daily Survival in Industrializing Montreal in 1993. In 1994, Bradbury won the CHA Sir John A. Macdonald prize for her book, Working Families: Age, Gender, and Daily Survival in Industrializing Montreal and the Harold Adams Innis Prize. In 2000, while working as the director of the History graduate program at York University, Bradbury participated in CBC's television documentary series Canada: A People's History.

From 2007 to 2011, Bradbury served as chair of York University's School of Women's Studies. In 2011, Bradbury was awarded York University's Faculty of Graduate Studies Teaching Award and the Principal's Research Award at Glendon College.

In 2013, her book Wife to Widow. Lives, Laws and Politics in 19th century Montreal was shortlisted for the Canada Prize in Social Sciences. The book focused on two generations of women in Montreal living around the Lower Canada Rebellion to showcase how women of different religions interacted with Montreal society. Although she eventually lost, her book was awarded the Prix Lionel Groulx – Fondation Yves-Saint-Germain prize, the Clio-Québec Prize, and François-Xavier Garneau Medal by the CHA. That same year, Bradbury was inducted as a fellow of the Royal Society of Canada.

In 2014, Bradbury retired from York University.

== Publications ==
The following is a list of Bradbury's publications:

- Wife to Widow. Lives, Laws and Politics in Nineteenth-century Montreal (2011)
- Negotiating Identities in 19th and 20th Century Montreal (2005)
- Wife to Widow: Class, Culture, Family and the Law in Nineteenth-Century Quebec (1997)
- Familles ouvrières à Montréal. Age, genre et survie quotidienne pendant la phase d'industrialisation (1995)
- Working Families. Age, Gender and Daily Survival in Industrializing Montreal (1993)
- Canadian Family History (1992)
- Caroline's Dilemma: A colonial inheritance saga (2019)
