= H. V. Nelles =

Canadian historian

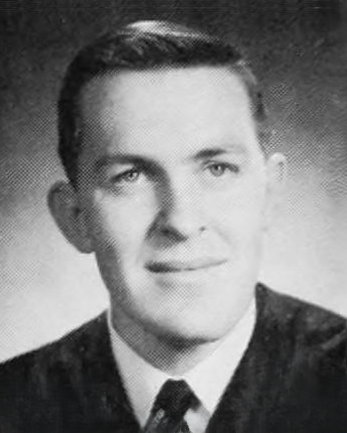
- Born: 9 November 1942 (age 82); Galt, Ontario
- Education: University of Toronto (BA '64, MA '65, PhD '70)
- Spouse: Diane Dilworth (m. 1967)

Henry Vivian Nelles (born 9 November 1942) is a Canadian historian and professor emeritus at York University. In 1981, he was the Visiting King Professor at Harvard University.

Nelles collaborated frequently with Christopher Armstrong (1942–2022), with whom he co-wrote six books.

== Works ==
- 1974: The Politics of Development: Forests, Mines & Hydro-Electric Power in Ontario, 1849–1941
- 1977: The Revenge of the Methodist Bicycle Company: Sunday Streetcars and Municipal Reform in Toronto, 1888–1897 (with Christopher Armstrong)
- 1986: Monopoly's Moment: The Organization and Regulation of Canadian Utilities, 1830–1930 (with Christopher Armstrong)
- 1988: Southern Exposure: Canadian Promoters in Latin America and the Caribbean, 1896–1930 (with Christopher Armstrong)
- 1999: The Art of Nation-Building: Pageantry and Spectacle at Quebec's Tercentenary
- 2004: A Little History of Canada
- 2007: The Painted Valley: Artists along Alberta's Bow Valley River, 1845–2000 (with Christopher Armstrong)
- 2009: The River Returns: An Environmental History of the Bow (with Christopher Armstrong and Matthew Evenden)
- 2013: Wilderness and Waterpower: How Banff National Park Became a Hydroelectric Storage Reservoir (with Christopher Armstrong)
