= Canadian Historical Review =

- Discipline: History
- Language: English
- Edited by: P.E. Bryden and Brian Gettler

Publication details
- History: 1897-present
- Publisher: University of Toronto Press (Canada)
- Frequency: Quarterly

Standard abbreviations
- ISO 4: Can. Hist. Rev.

Indexing
- ISSN: 0008-3755 (print); 1710-1093 (web)

Links
- Journal homepage

The Canadian Historical Review (CHR) is a scholarly journal in Canada, founded in 1920 and published by the University of Toronto Press. The CHR publishes articles about the ideas, people, and events important to Canadian history, as well as book reviews and detailed bibliographies of recent Canadian historical publications. The CHR covers all topics of Canadian history, ranging from Indigenous issues to liberalism to the First World War. The CHR has two major objectives: "to promote high standards of research and writing in Canada … and to foster the study of Canadian history."

Canadian Historical Review publishes articles in both of Canada's official languages, French and English. The Journal publishes both online and print versions, and subscribers can search for and read thousands of past publications via either CHR Online or Project MUSE.

== History ==
The Canadian Historical Review was founded at the University of Toronto in 1920 as a continuation of a previous journal, the Review of Historical Publications Relating to Canada, itself founded by George Wrong, in 1897. The initiative to digitize the CHR's holdings includes material from this previous journal, and papers from as early as 1897 are available to subscribers online as a result.

The Canadian Historical Review's entries have changed as history and historiography itself have progressed. Marlene Shore's The Contested Past: Reading Canada's History – Selections from the Canadian Historical Review, tracks these changes, tracing major themes of the CHR chronologically: "Nation and Diversity, 1920-1939; War, Centralization; and Reaction, 1940-1965; The Renewal of Diversity, 1966 to present; and Reflections." The Contested Past also suggests that the key themes in Canadian history reflected by the CHR are "Native-European contact, society and war, the nature of Canadian and Quebec nationalism, class-consciousness, and gender politics."

== Editors ==
The CHR's editors are P.E. Bryden and Brian Gettler. Bryden, a professor at the University of Victoria since 2005, focuses on Canadian political history, particularly with respect to relationships within government and between governments. Gettler, an associate professor at the University of Toronto since 2015, studies colonialism, state formation, and capitalism in nineteenth- and twentieth-century Canada as well as narratives of Quebec national history in relation to Indigenous peoples.

The editorial board comprises Keith Carlson from the University of the Fraser Valley, Karine Hébert from the Université du Québec à Rimouski, Nancy Janovicek from the University of Calgary, Andy Parnaby from Cape Breton University, and Steven Penfold from the University of Toronto. The Book Review Editors are Kerry Badgley from Carleton University and Lisa Pasolli from Queen's University.

== Canadian Historical Review Prize ==
Each year CHR awards a prize for best article of the year, known as the Canadian Historical Review Prize. The winner for 2023 was George Colpitts, who won for his article "Murder, Death, and Suicide at the Zoo: Revisiting Anthropomorphic Stories of Quebec's Captive Polar Bears, 1936-88", which appeared in the March 2023 issue.
