= Bibliography of the 1837–38 insurrections in Lower Canada =

The following is an incomplete bibliography of the 1837-1838 insurrections in Lower Canada in the English and French languages, by publication date and document type.

== In English ==
=== Works ===
- Greenwood, Frank Murray. and Barry Wright, ed. (2002). Canadian State Trials. Volume 2: Rebellion and Invasion in the Canadas, 1837-1839, Toronto: The Osgoode Society and University of Toronto Press, 512 p. (ISBN 0-8020-3748-8) (preview)
- Boissery, Beverly (1995). A Deep Sense of Wrong: The Treason Trials, and Transportation to New South Wales of Lower Canadian Rebels after the 1838 Rebellion, Toronto: Dundurn Press, 367 p. (ISBN 1-55002-242-3)
- Greer, Allan (1993). The Patriots and the People: The Rebellion of 1837 in Rural Lower Canada, Toronto: University of Toronto Press, 385 p. (ISBN 0-8020-6930-4) (preview)
- Senior, Elinor Kyte (1985). Redcoats and Patriotes: The Rebellions in Lower Canada, 1837-38, Ontario: Canada's Wings, Inc., 218 p. (ISBN 0-920002-28-5)
- Mann, Michael (1986). A Particular Duty: The Canadian Rebellions 1837-1839, Salisbury (Wiltshire): Michael Russel Publishing, 211 p.
- Buckner, Philip Alfred (1985). The Transition to Responsible Government: British Policy in British, North America, 1815-1850, Westport, Conn.: Greenwood Press, 358 p.
- Tiffany, Orrin Edward (1980). The Relations of the United States to the Canadian Rebellion of 1837-1838, Toronto: Coles Pub., 147 p.
- Burroughs, Peter (1972). The Canadian Crisis and the British Colonial Policy, 1828-1849, Toronto: MacMillan, 118 p.
- Schull, Joseph (1971). Rebellion: the Rising in French Canada 1837, Toronto: Macmillan, 226 p.
- Ryerson, Stanley Bréhaut (1968). Unequal Union: Confederation and the Roots of Conflict in the Canadas, 1815-1873, Toronto : Progress Books, 477 p.
- Manning, Helen Taft (1962). The Revolt of French Canada, 1800-1835. A Chapter in the History of the British Commonwealth, Toronto: Macmillan Company of Canada, 426 p.
- Kinchen, Oscar Arvle (1956). The Rise and Fall of the Patriot Hunters, Toronto: Burns and Maceachern, 150 p.
- Morison, John Lyle (1919). British Supremacy and Canadian Self-Government, 1839-1854, Toronto: S. B. Gundy, 369 p.
- Decelles, Alfred Duclos (1916). The "Patriotes" of '37: A Chronicle of the Lower Canadian Rebellion, Toronto: Glasgow, Brook & Co., 140 p. [translated by Stewart Wallace]
- Bradshaw, Frederick (1903). Self-Government in Canada, and How it was Achieved: The Story of Lord Durham's Report, London: P.S.King, 414 p. (online)

=== Essays, thesis ===
- Sossoyan, Matthieu (1999). The Kahnawake Iroquois and the Lower-Canadian Rebellions, 1837-1838, Montréal: McGill University, (master thesis in anthropology) (online)
- Thorbum, Mark (1996). The 1838 1839 Courts Martial of Patriotes in Lower Canada: Were They Constitutional? University of British Columbia, 152 p. (master's thesis)
- Finnegan, Mary (1982). The Irish-French Alliance in Lower Canada, 1822-1835. Université Concordia, 73 p (master's thesis).
- Boissery, Beverly Dawn (1977). The Patriote Convicts: A Study of the 1838 Rebellion in Lower Canada and the Transportation of Some Participants to New South Wales, 2 volumes (doctoral thesis in Philosophy)
- Duncan, Stuart Mackay (1965). The Military suppression of the rebellions of 1837-38. University of Western Ontario, 166 p. (master's thesis)
- Gilley, C. T. (1943). The Constitutional Act of 1791, a Study of the Causes of the Canadian Revolution of 1837, University of Colorado (master's thesis)
- Knowles E. C. (1929). The English Philosophical Radicals and Lower Canada, 1800-1835, McGill University (master's thesis)

=== Official reports, correspondence, etc. ===
- Copies or extracts of correspondence relative to the affairs of British North America. Ordered, by The House of Commons, to be printed, 11 February 1839, London, 1839, 400 p.
- First report of the Commissioners Appointed to Enquire into the Losses Occasioned by the Troubles during the Years 1837 and 1838, and into the Damages Arising Therefrom, Montréal: printed by Lovell & Gibson, 1846, 49 p.
- Lambton, John George, Charles Buller, Edward Gibbon Wakefield (1839). The Report and Despatches of the Earl of Durham, Her Majesty's High Commissioner and Governor-General of British North America, London: Ridgways, Piccadilly, 423 p. (online)
- Ordinances passed in the first session of the Special Council for the Affairs of Lower Canada, Montreal, 1838, Montreal: Printed by Andrew H. Armour and Hew Ramsay, 1838, 80 p.
- Russell, John (1837). Resolutions intended to be proposed by Lord John Russell, in a committee of the whole house, relative to the affairs of Canada, London: House of Commons (online)
- Select Committee on the Affairs of Lower Canada. Lower Canada Copy of the Minutes of the Evidence Taken Before the Select Committee Appointed in the Year 1834 on the Affairs of Lower Canada, London: British House of Commons, 11 March 1837
- Acheson, Archibald, Charles Edward Grey, George Gipps (1837). "Reports of Commissioners on Grievances Complained of in Lower Canada. Ordered by the House of Commons to be printed, 20th February, 1837", in Parliamentary Papers, XXIV, 3-416. (online)
- Select Committee on the Affairs of Lower Canada (1834). Report from Select Committee on Lower Canada, London: British House of Commons, 29 p.
- House of Assembly of Lower Canada (1834). The Ninety-Two Resolutions, Quebec (online)
- Select Committee on the Civil Government of Canada (1828). Report from the Select Committee on the Civil Government of Canada, House of Commons, 377 p. (online)
- House of Assembly of Lower Canada. Journals of the House of Assembly of Lower Canada (1793-1837), Quebec: John Neilson (online)
- Legislative Council of Lower Canada. Journals of the Legislative Council of Lower Canada (1802-1837), Quebec: John Neilson (online)
- Special Council of Lower Canada. Journals of the Special Council of Lower Canada, Montreal: A.H. Armour and H. Ramsay (online)

=== Public writings by Patriotes ===
- Brown, Thomas Storrow (1898). 1837, My Connection With It, Quebec: Raoul Renault, Publisher, 38 p.(online)
- Nelson, Robert (1838). Declaration of Independence of Lower Canada, United States (online)
- Nelson, Robert (1838). Address to the people of Canada, United States (online)
- Papineau, Louis-Joseph and John Neilson (1823). Letter from L. J. Papineau and J. Neilson, Esqs., Addressed to His Majesty's Under Secretary of State on the Subject of the Proposed Union of the Provinces of Upper and Lower Canada, London: Printed by William Clowes, Northumberland-court, 81 p. (online)

=== Private letters, journals by Patriotes ===
- Greenwood, Frank Murray (1980). Land of a Thousand Sorrows. The Australian Prison Journal 1840-1842, of the Exiled Canadien Patriote, François-Maurice Lepailleur, Vancouver: University of British Columbia Press, 174 p. (ISBN 0-7748-0123-9) [Translated and edited by F. Murray Greenwood]
- Mackaness, Georges (1949). François-Xavier Prieur. Notes of a Convict of 1838, Sydney: D.S. Ford, 142 p. [Translated and annotated by Georges Mackaness]
- Mackaness, Georges (1944). Léandre Ducharme. Journal of a Political Exile in Australia, Sydney: D.S. Ford Printer, 79 p. (ISBN 0-909895-15-5)

=== Foreign coverage of the events ===
- "The Canada Question", in The United States Democratic Review, Volume 1, Issue 2, January 1838, pp. 205–220 (online)
- "History of the Recent Insurrection in the Canadas - Part First", in The United States Democratic Review, Volume 4, Issue 3, March–June 1838, pp. 73–87 (online)
- "History of the Recent Insurrection in the Canadas - Part Second", in The United States Democratic Review, Volume 4, Issue 3, March–June 1838, pp. 87–104 (online)
- "The Execution in Canada", in The United States Democratic Review, Volume 5, Issue 15, March 1839, pp. 343–344 (online)

=== Public writings by British Radicals ===
- Roebuck, John Arthur (1835). Remarks on the Proposed Union of the Canadas, published in the year 1822, Quebec, 12 p.
- Roebuck, John Arthur (1834). Debate in the House of Commons, on the 15th April, 1834, on Mr. Roebuck's Motion for "a Select Committee to inquire the means of remedying the evils which exist in the form of the governments now existing in Upper and Lower Canada.", 26 p.
- Roebuck, John Arthur (1835). The Canadas and Their Grievances, 32 p.
- Roebuck, John Arthur (1836). Existing Difficulties in the Government of the Canadas, London: Printed by C. and W. Reynell, 68 p. (online)
- Roebuck, John Arthur et al. The Canadian Portfolio, London: Charles Fox, 1838, (5 issues)
- Roebuck, John Arthur (1849). The Colonies of England: A Plan for the Government of Portion of Our Colonial Possessions, 248 p. (online)
- Mill, John Stuart. "Radical Party and Canada: Lord Durham and the Canadians", in London and Westminster Review, VI & XXVIII, 502-33., January 1838 (online)
- Brougham, Henry (1837). Dissentient opinion of Lord Brougham on John Russell's Ten Resolutions, (online)
- Hume, Joseph (1834). The Celebrated letter of Joseph Hume, Esq., M.P., to William Lyon Mackenzie, Esq., mayor of Toronto, declaratory of a design to "Free these Provinces from the baneful Domination of the Mother Country!", Toronto: G.P. Bull, 64 p.
- Chapman, Henry Samuel (1835). Petition from Lower Canada, with Explanatory Remarks, London: Printed by William Clowes, 40 p. (online)
- Chapman, Henry Samuel (1838). An Impartial and Authentic Account of the Civil War in the Canadas [...], J. Saunders, Jr, 2 volumes (online)
- Lovett, William (1837). The Address of the London Working Men's Association to the People of Canada, England (online)
- Bentham, Jeremy. Canada: Emancipate Your Colonies! An Unpublished Argument, London: Effingham Wilson, 1838

=== Public writings by Constitutionals ===
- Montreal Constitutional Association (1837). Address of the Constitutional Association of the City of Montreal to the Inhabitants of the Sister Colonies, Montreal (online)
- Robertson, William and J. Guthrie Scott (1836). Address of the Constitutional Association of Montreal to the Inhabitants of British America, Montreal (online)
- Thom, Adam (1836). Anti-Gallic Letters: Addressed to His Excellency, the Earl of Gosford, Governor-in-Chief of the Canadas, Montréal: The Herald Office, 226 p. (online)
- Thom, Adam (1835). Remarks on the Petition of the Convention, and on the Petition of the Constitutionalists, Montréal: The Herald Office, 191 p. (online)

=== Biographies ===
- Verney, Jack (1994). O'Callaghan. The Making and Unmaking of a Rebel, Montréal: McGill-Queen's Press, 350 p. (ISBN 0-88629-233-6) (preview)
- Ajzenstat, Janet (1988). The Political Thought of Lord Durham, Montréal: McGill-Queen's University Press, 160 p. (ISBN 0-7735-0637-3) (preview)

=== Trials ===
- Borthwick, John Douglas (1866). History of the Montreal prison from A.D. 1784 to A.D. 1886 : containing a complete record of the Troubles of 1837-1838, burning of the Parliament buildings in 1849, the St. Alban's raiders, 1864, the two Fenian raids of 1866 and 1870 [...], Montreal: A. Periard, bookseller, publisher and importer, 269 p. (online)
- Cherrier, André-Romuald (1839). Trial of Joseph N. Cardinal, and others, to which are added, the argumentative petition in favour of the prisoners, and several other precious documents, &c. &c. &c., Montreal: John Lovell, Printer, 141 p.
- Colborne, John (1839). Report of the State Trials, Before a General Court Martial Held at Montreal in 1838-9: Exhibiting a Complete History of the Late Rebellion in Lower Canada, Montreal: Armour and Ramsay, (online: volume 1, volume 2)

=== Fiction ===
- Morgan, Jan Henry (1992). Welcome Niall O'Donell, Immigrant! (A Chronicle of Lower Canada: Book One), Ottawa: Chantecler Press.
- Morgan, Jan Henry (1993). A Dangerous Direction (A Chronicle of Lower Canada: Book Two), Ottawa: Chantecler Press.
- Morgan, Jan Henry (1995). A Damned Rebellion! (A Chronicle of Lower Canada: Book Three), Ottawa: Chantecler Press.
- Soderstrom, Mary (1998). The Words on the Wall: Robert Nelson & the Rebellion of 1837, Ottawa: Oberon Press, 230 p. (ISBN 0-7780-1104-6)
- Verne, Jules (1889). Family Without a Name, New York: John W. Lovell, 312 p.

=== Bibliographies ===
- Staton, Frances M. (1924). The Rebellion of 1837-1838. (A Bibliography of the Sources of Information in the Public Reference Library of the City of Toronto), Toronto: Public Library of Toronto, 81 p.

=== Miscellaneous ===
- Ormsby, William (1964). Charles Grey. Crisis in the Canadas, 1838-1839: The Grey Journals and Letters, Toronto: MacMillan, 244 p.
- Young, Gilbert Ainslie (1839). The Canadian Question, London: J. Ridgway and Sons, 83 p. (online)
- Neate, Charles (1838). A Plain Statement of the Quarrel with Canada: In Which Is Considered Who First Infringed the Constitution of the Colony, London: James Ridgway and sons, 20 p. (online)
- Elliot, Thomas Frederick (1838). The Canadian Controversy; Its Origin, Nature, and Merits, London: Longman, Orme, Brown, Green & Longmans, 84 p. (online)
- Theller, Edward Alexander (1841). Canada in 1837 38, showing, by historical facts, the causes of the late attempted Revolution, and of its failure; the present condition of the people, and their future prospects, together with the personal adventures of the author, and others who were connected with the revolution, Philadelphia: Henry F. Anners; New York: J. & H. G. Langley (volume 1, volume 2)
- Saint-Pierre, Thelesphore (1897). The Americans and Canada in 1837-38: Authentic Documents, Montréal: A.P. Pigeon, 58 p.

== In French ==
=== Works ===
- Rheault, Marcel J. and Georges Aubin (2006). Médecins et patriotes, 1837-1838, Québec: Éditions du Septentrion, 350 p. (ISBN 2-89448-481-X) (publisher)
- Mackay, Julien S. (2006). Notaires et patriotes, 1837-1838, Sillery: Septentrion, 254 p. (ISBN 2-89448-478-X) (publisher)
- Bellemare, George (2005). Saint-Charles 1837 et la survie d'un peuple menacé, Montréal: Guérin, 223 p. (ISBN 2-7601-6863-8)
- Labonté, François (2004). Alias Anthony St. John : les Patriotes canadiens aux États-Unis : décembre 1837-mai 1838 : première partie, Sainte-Foy: Presses de l'Université Laval, 297 p. (ISBN 2-7637-8139-X) (Preview)
- Beauchamp, Lionel and Jean-René Thuot (2004). Les patriotes de Saint-Roch-de-l'Achigan : idées libérales et agitation politique entre 1830 et 1860, Saint-Roch-de-l'Achigan: Société d'histoire de Saint-Roch-de-l'Achigan, 90 p. (ISBN 2-9808198-1-6)
- Laporte, Gilles (2004). Patriotes et Loyaux : leadership régional et mobilisation politique en 1837 et 1838, Sillery: Septentrion, 414 p. (ISBN 2-89448-382-1) (publisher)
- Hamel, Solange (2003). Les patriotes oubliés de la Montérégie, 1837, Saint-Alphonse-de-Granby: Éditions de la Paix, 129 p. (ISBN 2-922565-88-2) (publisher)
- Desjardins, Pierre (2003). Le mouvement patriote à la Pointe-aux-Trembles, 1834-1846, Montréal: Atelier d'histoire de la Pointe-aux-Trembles, 53 p. (ISBN 2-9808103-0-4)
- Messier, Alain (2002). Dictionnaire encyclopédique et historique des patriotes (1837-1838), Montréal: Guérin, 500 p. (ISBN 2-7601-6345-8)
- Filteau, Gérard (2003). Histoire des Patriotes, Montréal: Septentrion, 2003, 664 p. (ISBN 2-89448-341-4) (publisher)
- Boileau, Gilles (1998). 1837 et les patriotes de Deux-Montagnes : les voix de la mémoire, Montréal: Méridien, 200 p. (ISBN 2-89415-235-3)
- Greer, Allan (1997). Habitants et patriotes : la rébellion de 1837 dans les campagnes du Bas-Canada, Montréal : Boréal, 370 p. (ISBN 2-89052-855-3) (review)[Translated from English by Christiane Teasdale]
- Senior, Elinor Kyte (1997). Les habits rouges et les patriotes, Montréal: VLB, 310 p. (ISBN 2-89005-665-1) (review)
- Schull, Joseph (1997). Rébellion : le soulèvement patriote de 1837 au Bas-Canada, Montréal: Éditions Québec Amérique, 303 p. (ISBN 2-89037-903-5) [Translated from English by Dominique Clift and Claude Frappier]
- Lambert, Pierre (1994). Les Patriotes de Beloeil : le mouvement patriote, les insurrections de 1837-1838 et les paroissiens de Beloeil, Sillery: Septentrion, 189 p. (ISBN 2-89448-000-8) (preview)
- Rochon, Paul (1993). Les derniers patriotes : les exilés de 1840 vous parlent, Montréal: Éditions du Taureau, 1993, 287 p. (ISBN 2-9800845-3-0)
- Bergevin, Henri (1989). Les Patriotes exilés en Australie en 1839, Joliette: Société nationale des Québécois de Lanaudière, 52 p. (ISBN 2-921246-16-3)
- Rochon, Paul (1989). 1839 : la lente agonie des patriotes, Montréal: Éditions du Taureau, 287 p. (ISBN 2-9800845-2-2)
- Lacoursière, Jacques and Denis Vaugeois (ed.) (1987). Courte histoire des patriotes de 1837-1838 : synthèse, Saint-Denis-sur-Richelieu : Comité de la fête des patriotes Saint-Charles & Saint-Denis, 16 p.
- Rochon, Paul (1987). 1837 : la petite histoire des Patriotes, Montréal: Éditions du Taureau, 283 p. (ISBN 2-9800845-0-6)
- Rochon, Paul (1987). 1838 : l'histoire oubliée des Patriotes, Montréal: Éditions du Taureau, 287 p. (ISBN 2-9800845-1-4)
- Bernard, Jean-Paul (1983). Les Rébellions de 1837-1838 : les patriotes du Bas-Canada dans la mémoire collective et chez les historiens, Montréal: Boréal Express, 349 p. (ISBN 2-89052-083-8)
- Hare, John (1971). Les Patriotes, 1830-1839. Textes, Ottawa: Éditions Libération, 232 p.
- Lacoursière, Jacques and Denis Vaugeois (ed.) (1969). Les troubles de 1837-1838, Montréal: Fides, 2 vol.
- Séguin, Robert-Lionel (1955). Le Mouvement insurrectionnel dans la presqu'île de Vaudreuil, 1837-1838, Montréal: Librairie Ducharme limitée, 144 p.
- Fauteux, Aegidius (1950). Patriotes de 1837-1838, Montréal: les Editions des Dix, 433 p.
- Richard, Jean-Baptiste (1938). Les Événements de 1837 à Saint-Denis-sur-Richelieu, Saint-Hyacinthe : Société d'histoire régionale de Saint-Hyacinthe, 47 p.
- Dubois, Emile (1937). Le Feu de la Rivière-du-Chêne : étude historique sur le mouvement insurrectionnel de 1837 au nord de Montréal, Québec, 340 p.
- David, Laurent-Olivier (1884). Les Patriotes de 1837-1838, Montréal: Eusèbe Senécal & fils, imprimeurs-éditeurs, 297 p. (online)
- Globensky, Charles Auguste Maximilien (1883). La Rébellion de 1837 à Saint-Eustache : précédé d'un exposé de la situation politique du Bas-Canada depuis la cession, Québec: Imprimerie A. Coté et cie, 334 p. (online)
- Carrier, Louis-Napoléon (1877). Les événements de 1837-38 : esquisse historique de l'insurrection du Bas-Canada, Québec : Imprimerie de l'Evénement, 194 p. (online)

=== Essays, thesis ===
- Bolduc, Marc (1997). Les élections générales de 1834 (Bas-Canada) et les élections générales de 1841 (Ancien Bas-Canada): continuités et ruptures, Montréal : Université du Québec à Montréal, 132 p. (master thesis in history)
- Ippersiel, Fernand (1990). Les Cousins ennemis : Louis-Joseph Papineau et Jean-Jacques Lartigue : essai, Montréal: Guérin littérature, 254 p. (ISBN 2-7601-2406-1)
- Clément, Micheline (1984). Le discours patriote : égalitarisme agraire ou projet de démocratie de petits producteurs, Université du Québec à Montréal, 250 p. (master thesis in history)
- Parent, Francine (1984). Les Patriotes de Châteauguay (1838) Montréal: Université de Montréal (master thesis in history)
- Beaugrand-Champagne, Denyse (1990). Les mouvements patriote et loyal dans les comtés de Missisquoi, Shefford et Stanstead, 1834-1837, Montréal: Université du Québec à Montréal, 195 p. (master thesis in history)
- Laporte, Gilles (1987). Le radical britannique Chapman et le Bas-Canada : 1832-1839, Montréal: Université du Québec à Montréal, 207 p. (master thesis in history)

=== Official reports, correspondence ===
- Lambton, John George, Charles Buller, Edward Gibbon Wakefield] (1839). Rapport de Lord Durham. Haut-Commissaire de Sa Majesté, etc. etc., sur les affaires de l'Amérique septentrionale britannique, Montréal: L'Ami du peuple, 200 p. (online)
- Russell, John (1837). Résolutions que lord John Russell entend soumettre, à un comité de toute la Chambre, relativement aux affaires du Canada, London: House of Commons (online)
- Papineau, Louis-Joseph (1834). Les 92 résolutions de l'Assemblée législative du Bas-Canada, Quebec: House of Assembly (online)

=== Private letters and Journals by Patriotes ===
- Desbiens, Marie-Frédérique and Jean-François Nadeau (2001). Chevalier de Lorimier. 15 février 1839 : lettres d'un patriote condamné à mort. édition préparée par ..., Montréal: Comeau & Nadeau, 125 p. (ISBN 2-922494-45-4)
- Aubin, Georges (2007). Amédée Papineau. Journal d'un Fils de la Liberté, 1838-1855, Sillery: Septentrion, 957 p. (ISBN 2-89448-120-9) (preview)
- Aubin, Georges (2000). Au Pied-du-Courant : lettres des prisonniers politiques de 1837-1839, Montréal: Comeau & Nadeau, 457 p. (ISBN 2-922494-19-5)
- Aubin, Georges and Renée Blanchet (2001). Rosalie Papineau-Dessaulles. Correspondance, 1805-1854, Montréal: Éditions Varia, 305 p. (ISBN 2-922245-52-7)
- Aubin, Georges (2007). Papineau en exil à Paris. Tome I : Dictionnaire, Trois-Pistoles: Éditions Trois-Pistoles, 304 p.
- Aubin, Georges (2007). Papineau en exil à Paris. Tome II : Lettres reçues, 1839-1845, Trois-Pistoles: Éditions Trois-Pistoles, 599 p.
- Aubin, Georges (2007). Papineau en exil à Paris. Tome III : Drame rue de Provence, Trois-Pistoles: Éditions Trois-Pistoles, 218 p.
- Aubin, Georges and Renée Blanchet, collab. of Marla Arbach (2006). Louis-Joseph Papineau. Lettres à divers correspondants, Tome I: 1810-1845, Montréal: Les Éditions Varia, 438 p. (ISBN 2-89606-024-3)
- Aubin, Georges and Renée Blanchet, collab. of Marla Arbach (2006). Louis-Joseph Papineau. Lettres à divers correspondants, Tome II : 1845-1871, Montréal: Les Éditions Varia 600 p. (ISBN 2-89606-027-8)
- Aubin, Georges and Renée Blanchet (2004). Louis-Joseph Papineau. Lettres à ses enfants, Tome I : 1825-1854, Montréal: Les Éditions Varia, 658 p. (ISBN 2-922245-91-8)
- Aubin, Georges and Renée Blanchet (2004). Louis-Joseph Papineau. Lettres à ses enfants, Tome II : 1855-1871, Montréal: Les Éditions Varia, 758 p. (ISBN 2-922245-92-6)
- Renée Blanchet and Georges Aubin (2000). Louis-Joseph Papineau, Lettres à Julie, Québec: Archives nationales du Québec, 814 p. (ISBN 2-89448-165-9) (preview)
- Aubin, Georges (1999). Louis-Hippolyte La Fontaine. Journal de voyage en Europe, 1837-1838, Sillery: Septentrion, 153 p. (ISBN 2-89448-142-X) (preview)
- Blanchet, Renée (1997). Julie Papineau. Une femme patriote : correspondance, 1823-1862, Sillery: Septentrion, 518 p. (ISBN 2-89448-096-2) (preview)
- Aubin, Georges (1996). François-Maurice Lepailleur. Journal d'un patriote exilé en Australie, 1839-1845, Sillery: Septentrion, 411 p. (ISBN 2-89448-071-7) (preview)
- Aubin, Georges (1992). Jean-Philippe Boucher-Belleville. Journal d'un patriote (1837 et 1838), Montréal: Guérin littérature, 174 p. (ISBN 2-7601-2530-0)
- Aubin, Georges (1996). Siméon Marchesseault. Lettres à Judith : correspondance d'un patriote exilé, Sillery: Septentrion, 124 p. (ISBN 2-89448-056-3) (preview)
- Aubin, Georges (1999). Louis Perrault. Lettres d'un patriote réfugié au Vermont, 1837-1839, Montréal: Éditions du Méridien, 198 p. (ISBN 2-89415-251-5)
- Hare, John and Renée Landry (1999). Hypolite Lanctot. Souvenirs d'un patriote exilé en Australie, 1838-1845, Sillery: Septentrion, 220 p. (ISBN 2-89448-133-0) (preview)
- Bouchette, Robert Shore Milnes (1903). Mémoires de Robert-S.-M. Bouchette, 1805-1840, recueillis par son fils Errol Bouchette et annotés par A.-D. Decelles, Montréal: la Cie de publication de la Revue canadienne, 129 p. (online)
- Prieur, François-Xavier (1884). Notes d'un condamné politique de 1838, Montréal : Librairie Saint-Joseph, Cadieux & Derome, 240 p. (online)
- Poutré, Félix (1862). Échappé de la potence. Souvenirs d'un prisonnier d'état canadien en 1838, Montréal: E. Senécal, 47 p. (online)
- Ducharme, Léandre (1845). Journal d'un exilé politique aux terres australes, Montréal: imprimé par F. Cinq-Mars, Bureau de l'Aurore, 1845, 106 p. (online)

=== Foreign coverage of the events ===
- Du Bled, Victor. "Une ancienne colonie française", in La Revue des Deux Mondes, 1885, pp. 424–460

=== Public writings by Patriotes ===
- Aubin, Georges (2003). Louis-Joseph Papineau. Cette fatale Union. Adresses, discours et manifestes 1847-1848, Montréal: Lux éditeur, 223 p. (ISBN 2-89596-009-7)
- Lamonde, Yvan and Claude Larin (1998). Louis-Joseph Papineau. Un demi-siècle de combats. Interventions publiques, Montréal: Éditions Fides, 662 p. (ISBN 2-7621-2008-X)
- Aubin, Georges (1998). Robert Nelson : Déclaration d'indépendance et autres écrits, 1832-1848, Montréal : Comeau & Nadeau, 90 p. (ISBN 2-922494-00-4) [traduction de Michel de Lorimier et Renée Andrewes]
- Aubin, Georges (1998). Wolfred Nelson. Écrits d'un patriote, 1812-1842, Montréal : Comeau & Nadeau, 177 p. (ISBN 2-9804963-8-3)
- Papineau, Louis-Joseph (1839). "Histoire de la résistance du Canada au gouvernement anglais", in Revue du Progrès, Paris, 1839, 35 p. (online)
- Ouellet, Fernand (1958). Papineau. Textes choisis et présentés par ... , Québec : Les Presses universitaires Laval, 103 p.
- Brown, Thomas Storrow (1837). Adresse des Fils de la liberté de Montréal aux jeunes gens des colonies de l'Amérique du Nord, Montreal (online)
- Lafontaine, Louis-Hippolyte (1834). Les deux girouettes ou l'Hypocrisie démasquée, Montréal: Imprimerie de la Minerve, 75 p. (online)
- List of the public meetings held in Lower Canada between May and November 1837 (resolutions, reports, addresses)

=== Public writings by Constitutionals ===
- Sabrevois de Bleury, Charles Clément (1839). Réfutation de l'écrit de Louis Joseph Papineau, ex-orateur de la Chambre d'Assemblée du Bas-Canada, intitulé Histoire de l'insurrection du Canada, publiée dans le recueil hebdomadaire la Revue du progrès, imprimée à Paris, Montréal: Imprimerie de John Lovell, 136 p. (online)
- de Marconnay, Hyacinthe Leblanc (1836). La petite clique dévoilée, quelques explications sur les manœuvres dirigées contre la minorité patriote qui prit part au vote sur les subsides dans la session de 1835-1836, plus particulièrement contre C.C. Sabrevois de Bleury, Rome, N.Y.?, 50 p.
- Mondelet, Dominique (1835). Traité sur la politique coloniale du Bas-Canada: divisé en deux parties : opposition dans la [sic] gouvernement, license de la presse, Conseil législatif par voie d'élection : réflexions sur l'état actuel du pays, Bas-Canada: Chez l'Auteur, 67 p.

=== Biographies ===
- Du Cap, Louis (2008). Bock : biographie historique de Charles-Guillaume Bouc, 1795-1861, Piedmont: L. Du Cap, (ISBN 978-2-9810563-0-6)
- Bouthillier, Élise (2007). Chevalier de Lorimier : défenseur de la liberté, Montréal: XYZ, 159 p. (ISBN 978-2-89261-504-3)
- Bernard, Philippe (2001). Amury Girod : un Suisse chez les Patriotes du Bas-Canada, Sillery: Septentrion, 2001, 255 p. (ISBN 2-89448-183-7) (preview)
- Boileau, Gilles (1999). Étienne Chartier, curé de Saint-Benoît, patriote et rebelle, Montréal: Éditions du Méridien, 191 p. (ISBN 2-89415-244-2)
- Reeves-Morache, Marcelle (19??). Joseph Duquette, patriote et martyr, Montréal: Editions A. St-Martin: Société nationale populaire du Québec, 21 p.
- Rumilly, Robert (1944). Papineau, Montréal: Éditions Bernard Valiquette, 281 p.
- Circé-Côté, Ève (1924). Papineau, son influence sur la pensée canadienne : essai de psychologie historique, Montréal: R.A. Regnault & cie, 252 p.
- DeCelles, Alfred Duclos (1905). Papineau, 1786-1871, Montréal: Librairie Beauchemin. 243 p. (online)
- Royal, Joseph (187?). Biographie de l'Hon. D.B. Viger, Montréal: imprimée par J.A. Plinguet, 34 p. (online)
- David, Laurent-Olivier (1872). L'Honorable Ls.-Jos. Papineau, Montréal: Typographie Geo. E. Desbarats, 32 p.
- Fabre, Hector (1856). Esquisse biographique sur Chevalier de Lorimier, Montréal: de l'imprimerie du "Pays", 1856, 15 p.

=== Commemoration of 1837-1838 ===
- Perrier, Onil (2003). 25 ans au service des patriotes et du patrimoine. L'histoire du comité de la fête des patriotes de Saint-Charles et Saint-Denis devenu la Société d'histoire des Riches-Lieux, 1978-2003, Saint-Denis-sur-Richelieu: La Société d'histoire / Montréal: Éditions Histoire Québec, 362 p.
- Les Patriotes de Saint-Marc-sur-Richelieu, 1837-1987, Saint-Marc-sur-Richelieu : Commission du 150ième anniversaire des patriotes de Saint-Marc-sur-Richelieu, 1987, 88 p.
- Saint-Denis fête ses patriotes, Saint-Denis?, 1987, 44 p.
- Les patriotes, 145 ans après : programme-souvenir de la fête des patriotes, St-Charles, St-Denis, 21 novembre 1982, Saint-Denis-sur-Richelieu?: Comité de la fête des patriotes, St-Charles et St-Denis, 1982, 16 p.
- Patriotes, espoir d'une nation : programme de la fête des patriotes, St-Charles et St-Denis, 21 et 22 novembre 1981, Saint-Denis-sur-Richelieu?: Comité de la fête des patriotes, St-Charles et St-Denis, 1981, 4 p.
- Patriotes pourquoi? : programme souvenir 1979 de la fête des Patriotes 1837-1838 à St-Charles et St-Denis, Saint-Denis-sur-Richelieu?, 1979, 16 p.
- Lalonde, Charles Henri (1937?). Album-souvenir : hommage des citoyens du comté des Deux-Montagnes aux patriotes de 1837, à Saint-Eustache, 10 octobre 1937, Québec, 20 p.
- Programme-souvenir : Saint-Charles-sur-Richelieu, le dimanche, 19 septembre 1937. Hommage aux Patriotes de 1837 à Montebello, en octobre 1937, Montréal: L'Action patriotique, 1937, 48 p.
- Groulx, Lionel (1937). Une heure avec l'abbé Groulx à propos des Patriotes de '37 : l'actualité, Montréal: Éditions des Jeunesses patriotes, 26 p.
- Souvenir des fêtes du centenaire de 1837 à St-Denis-sur-Richelieu, P.Q., Canada, 28-29 août 1937, Saint-Denis-sur-Richelieu?: Comité d'organisation des fêtes du centenaire des patriotes de 1837 à St-Denis, 1937?, 8 p.

=== Trials ===
- Cherrier, André-Romuald (1839). Procès de Joseph N. Cardinal, et autres, auquel on a joint la requête argumentative en faveur des prisonniers, et plusieurs autres documents précieux, &c. &c. &c., Montréal: John Lovell, imprimeur, 144 p.
- Jalbert, François (1839). La Reine vs Jalbert, accusé du meurtre du lieutenant Weir du 32e Régiment de Sa Majesté. Procès politique, Montréal : F. Cinq-Mars, 87 p.
- Procès politique, la reine vs. Nicolas et al. accusés d'avoir mis à mort le 27 novembre 1837, pendant l'insurrection le nommé Joseph Armand dit Chartrand, l'un des volontaires au service de sa majesté stationés à St. Jean : cités pour répondre à cette accusation devant le tribunal ayant juridiction criminelle, dans ce district le 6 août 1838 et acquittés par le jury le 7 août 1838, Montréal: imprimé et publié par Frs. Lemaître, 43 p.
- La Reine vs. Nicolas et al. : accusés d'avoir mis à mort, le 27 novembre 1837, pendant l'insurrection, le nommé Joseph Armand, dit Chartrand, l'un des volontaires au service de Sa Majesté, stationés [sic] à St. Jean, cités pour répondre à cette accusation devant le tribunal ayant juridiction criminelle, dans ce district, le 6 aôut 1838, et acquittés par le jury, le 7 août 1838, Montréal: Frs. Lemaitre, 1838

=== Fiction ===
- Jalette, Jocelyn (2009). La république assassinée des Patriotes, Saint-Damien-de-Brandon: Éditions du Soleil de minuit, 46 p. (ISBN 978-2-922691-73-3) [comic strip]
- Dupéré, Yves (2006). Les derniers insurgés : roman historique, Montréal: Hurtubise HMH, 451 p. (ISBN 2-89428-871-9)
- Séguin, Robert-Lionel (2006). Le dernier des Capots-Gris : roman; suivi de, Souviens-toi : méditations sur 1837, Notre-Dame-des-Neiges: Éditions Trois-Pistoles, 211 p. (ISBN 978-2-89583-141-9)
- Blanchet, Renée (2000). La chouayenne : récits de 1837-1838, Montréal: Éditions Varia, 185 p. (ISBN 2-922245-30-6)
- Soderstrom, Mary (1999). Robert Nelson, le médecin rebelle : roman, Montréal: L'Hexagone, 348 p. (ISBN 2-89006-612-6)
- Lachance, Micheline (1995). Le roman de Julie Papineau, Montréal: Éditions Québec/Amérique, 2 vol.
- Caron, Louis (1981–1990). Les Fils de la liberté : roman, Montréal: Boréal express, 3 volumes
  - Le Canard de bois, 1981
  - La Corne de brume, 1982
  - Le coup de poing, 1990
- Daveluy, Marie-Claire (1940?). Le Richelieu héroïque : les jours tragiques de 1837, Montréal: Librairie Granger frères limitée, 250 p.
- Achard, Eugène (1926). La Fin d'un traître : épisode de la révolte de 1837, Montréal: Bibliothèque de l'Action française, 60 p.
- de Roquebrune, Robert (1923). Les Habits rouges : roman canadien, Paris: Éditions du Monde nouveau, 280 p.
- Verne, Jules (1889). Famille-sans-nom, Paris: Pierre-Jules Hetzel, 427 p. (online)

=== Bibliographies ===
- Laporte, Gilles. "Bibliographie : Recherche dans la banque documentaire", in Les Patriotes de 1837@1838 (monographs, articles, brochures, imprimés, catalogues, archives, fiction)
- Laporte, Gilles. "Historiographie", in Les Patriotes de 1837@1838 (recensions, reviews)
- Richard, Béatrice. "Les Rébellions de 1837-1838", in Bibliographie, la guerre et le Québec, Chaire Hector-Fabre d'histoire du Québec de l'UQAM (inventory, imprimés, studies, articles, thesis)
- Bibliography of Louis-Joseph Papineau

=== Miscellaneous ===
- Perrier, Onil (2007). Les Québécoises de 1837-1838, LaSalle: Éditions idg, 47 p.
- Faubert, Michel (2003). Liste des patriotes prisonniers, 1837-1838-1839-1840, (online)
- Lartigue, Jean-Jacques (1992). Premier mandement à l'occasion des Troubles de 1837 (24 octobre 1837); Second mandement à l'occasion des Troubles de 1837 (8 janvier 1838), Saint-Jacques: Éditions du Pot de fer, 25 p.
- Dufresne, Françoise (198?). Douze pendus au Pied-du-Courant. Conférence prononcée devant les membres de la Société de généalogie canadienne-française à Montréal, Montréal?, 54 p.
- Lahalle, Bruno-André (1979). Jules Verne et le Québec (1837-1889) : Famille-sans-nom, Sherbrooke: Editions Naaman, 188 p. (ISBN 2-89040-014-X)
- Reeves-Morache, Marcelle (1975). Les Québécoises de 1837-1838, Montréal : Editions A. Saint-Martin: Société nationale populaire du Québec, 1975, 27 p.
- Mousseau, Joseph-Alfred (1860). Lecture publique sur Cardinal et Duquet, victimes de 37-38 : prononcée lors du 2nd anniversaire de la fondation de l'Institut canadien-français, le 16 mai 1860, Montréal: des presses de Plinguet & cie, 18 p.
- Éthier, Joseph Arthur Calixte (1905?). Conférence sur Chénier donnée par J.A.C. Étheir, député des Deux-Montagnes, sous les auspices du Club Chénier, le 29 janvier 1905, Hochelaga, de Montréal, Maisonneuve: Imp. J.A. Caron, 34 p.
- Borthwick, John Douglas (1898). Rébellion de 37-38 : précis complet de cette période, rôle d'honneur ou liste complète des patriotes détenus dans les prisons de Montréal en 1837, 1838, 1839, date et lieux des arrestations et autres détails intéressants et inédits sur ce sujet, Montréal: imprimerie du "Cultivateur", L.J. Tarte & frère, props., 94 p. (online)
- Maguire, Thomas (1838). Doctrine de l'Eglise catholique d'Irlande et de celle du Canada sur la révolte : recueil de pièces constatant l'uniformité de cette doctrine dans les deux pays et sa conformité avec celle de l'Eglise universelle, Québec: imprimée par W. Neilson, imprimeur-libraire, 129 p.
- Matthieu Sossoyan, « Les Iroquois de Khanawake et de Kanesatake et les rébellions de 1837-1838, » Bulletin d'histoire politique 12.1 (2003) : 107-115

== See also ==
- Bibliography of Canada
- Bibliography of Canadian history
- Bibliography of Canadian military history
- Bibliography of Nova Scotia
- Bibliography of British Columbia
- Bibliography of Saskatchewan history
- Bibliography of Alberta history
- List of books about the War of 1812
