= Bibliography of Saskatchewan history =

The following is a bibliography of Saskatchewan history.

== Surveys and reference ==
- Encyclopedia of Saskatchewan (2006) from U. of Regina Canadian Plains Research Center, (2005); 1071pp in print edition; article by experts on a very wide range of top
- The Canadian Encyclopedia (2008) A free online encyclopedia
- "Saskatchewan" in Canadian Annual Review of Politics and Public Affairs (University of Toronto Press, annual)
- The Dictionary of Canadian Biography(1966–2006), scholarly biographies of well-known people who died by 1930
- Archer, John H. Saskatchewan: A History. Saskatoon: Western Producer Prairie Books, 1980. 422 pp.; detailed bibliography on pp 385–402
- Barnhart, Gordon L., ed. Saskatchewan Premiers of the Twentieth Century. Regina: Canadian Plains Research Center, 2004. 418 pp.
- Bocking, D.H. Pages from the Past: Essays on Saskatchewan History (1979), popular history
- Boswell, Randy. Province with a Heart: Celebrating 100 Years in Saskatchewan (2005) 224pp, popular history excerpts and text search
- Eisler, Dale. "The Saskatchewan Myth." The Heavy Hand of History: Interpreting Saskatchewan's Past (2005): 67-85. online
- Francis, Douglas R. and Palmer, Howard, eds. The Prairie West: Historical Readings. Edmonton: Pica Pica Press, 1990 (2nd ed.).
- Friesen, Gerald. The Canadian Prairies: A History (2nd ed. 1987)
- Loewen, Royden. "On the Margin or in the Lead: Canadian Prairie Historiography," Agricultural History 73, no. 1 (Winter 1999): 27-45. in JSTOR
- Pitsula, James M. "Disparate Duo" Beaver 2005 85(4): 14-24, a comparison with Alberta, Fulltext in EBSCO
- Porter, Jene M., ed. Perspectives of Saskatchewan (University of Manitoba Press, 2009.) Pp. 377, 18 essays by scholars in several disciplines
- Richards, J. Howard and K.I. Fung, eds. Atlas of Saskatchewan (1969)
- Waiser, Bill. Saskatchewan: A New History (2005), 563 pp. a major scholarly survey
- Wright, Jim, A. W. Davey, and Alexander Robb. Saskatchewan: The history of a Province (McClelland and Stewart, 1955)

== Politics, law, government ==
- Barnhart, Gordon L. Peace, Progress and Prosperity: A Biography of Saskatchewan's First Premier, T. Walter Scott (2000)
- Biggs, L. and Stobbe, M., ed. Devine Rule in Saskatchewan: A Decade of Hope and Hardship. Saskatoon: Fifth House, 1991. 342 pp
- Brownsey, Keith. "Policy, Bureaucracy and Personality: Woodrow Lloyd and the Introduction of Medicare in Saskatchewan," Prairie Forum 1998 23(2): 197-210
- Eisler, Dale. Rumours of Glory: Saskatchewan and the Thatcher Years (1987). covers 1964-71 using 134 interviews with prominent figures
- Gruending, Dennis. Promises to Keep: A Political Biography of Allan Blakeney. (1990). 288 pp.
- Harding, Jim, ed. Social Policy and Social Justice: The NDP Government in Saskatchewan during the Blakeney Years. (1995). 484 pp.
- Johnson, A. W. Dream No Little Dreams: A Biography of the Douglas Government of Saskatchewan, 1944-1961. (2004). 370 pp. excerpts and text search
- Lin, Zhiqiu (2007). Policing the Wild North-West: A Sociological Study of the Provincial Police in Alberta and Saskatchewan, 1905-32. Archived from the original on March 8, 2016 – via Questia.
- Lipset, Seymour Martin (1950). Agrarian Socialism: The Cooperative Commonwealth Federation in Saskatchewan, a Study in Political Sociology. Archived from the original on 2011-06-18 – via Questia.
- Laycock, David. Populism and Democratic Thought in the Canadian Prairies, 1910 to 1945. U. of Toronto Press, 1990. 369 pp.
- Leeson, Howard, ed. Saskatchewan Politics: Into the Twenty-First Century. Regina: Canadian Plains Research Center, 2001. 425 pp.
- McGrane, David. Remaining Loyal: Social Democracy in Quebec and Saskatchewan (McGill-Queen's Press-MQUP, 2014)
- Pitsula, James M. and Ken Rasmussen. Privatizing a Province: The New Right in Saskatchewan. (1990), an attack from the left
- Pitsula, James M. Keeping Canada British: The Ku Klux Klan in 1920s Saskatchewan (University of British Columbia Press; 2013) 308 pages
- Quiring, David M. CCF Colonialism in Northern Saskatchewan: Battling Parish Priests, Bootleggers, and Fur Sharks. Vancouver: UBC Press, 2004.
- Quiring, Brett. "The Social and Political Philosophy of Woodrow S. Lloyd," Saskatchewan History 2004 56(1): 5-20.
- Smith, David E. Prairie Liberalism: The Liberal Party in Saskatchewan, 1905-71 (1975) 352 pages
- Smith, Dennis. Rogue Tory: The Life and Legend of John G. Diefenbaker. Toronto: Macfarlane Walter & Ross, 1995. 702 pp.
- Spencer, Dick. Singing the Blues: The Conservatives in Saskatchewan. (2007) 259 pp.
- Stewart, Walter. The Life and Political Times of Tommy Douglas. (2003)
- Wardhaugh, Robert A. Mackenzie King and the Prairie West. (2000). 328 pp.
- Warnock, John W. Saskatchewan: The Roots of Discontent and Protest (2004) 256 pages excerpts and text search
- Weir, Erin. Saskatchewan at a Crossroads: Fiscal Policy and Social Democratic Politics (2004) excerpts and text search
- Young, Walter D. The Anatomy of a Party: The National CCF, 1932–1961, (1969) 328 pages

== Economy, settlement, agriculture ==
- Anderson, Alan B. Settling Saskatchewan (U of Regina Press, 2013), "a comprehensive historical, geographical, and sociological overview" of the province's ethnic bloc or group settlements.
- Carter, Sarah. Lost Harvests: Prairie Indian Reserve Farmers and Government Policy. Montreal and Kingston: McGill-Queen's University Press, 1990.
- Dale-Burnett, Lisa, ed. Saskatchewan Agriculture: Lives Past and Present. Regina: Canadian Plains Research Center, (2006) 205 pp. short biographies
- Danysk, Cecilia. Hired Hands: Labour and the Development of Prairie Agriculture, 1880-1930. (1995). 231 pp.
- Friesen, Gerald. The Canadian Prairies: A History (1984)
- Love, Ronald S. Sasktel: The Biography of a Crown Corporation and the Development of Telecommunications in Saskatchewan (2003)
- McManus, Curtis R. Happyland: A History of the "Dirty Thirties" in Saskatchewan, 1914-1937 (University of Calgary Press, 2011) 326 pages. Argues that the agricultural crisis known as the "Dirty Thirties" began decades earlier and was only partly connected to the Great Depression. online free
- Morton, Arthur S. and Chester Martin, History of prairie settlement (1938) 511pp
- Norrie, K. H. "The Rate of Settlement of the Canadian Prairies, 1870-1911," Journal of Economic History, Vol. 35, No. 2 (Jun., 1975), pp. 410–427 in JSTOR; statistical models
- Palmer, Howard (1977). The Settlement of the West. Archived from the original on 2012-10-22 – via Questia.
- Rea, J. E. "The Wheat Board & the Western Farmer." Beaver 1997 77(1): 14-23. ISSN 0005-7517 Fulltext: Ebsco
- Rediger, Pat. The Crowns: A History of Public Enterprise in Saskatchewan. Regina: Canadian Plains Research Centre, 2004.
- Strikwerda, Eric J. "From Short-term Emergency to Long-term Crisis: Public Works Projects in Saskatoon, 1929-1932." Prairie Forum 2001 26(2): 169-186.
- Strikwerda, Eric. The Wages of Relief: Cities and the Unemployed in Prairie Canada, 1929-39 (Athabasca University Press, 2012)
- Warren, Jim and Carlisle, Kathleen, eds. On the Side of the People: A History of Labour in Saskatchewan. Regina: Coteau Books, 2005. 344 pp.

== Society, culture ==
- Barron, F. Laurie. Walking in Indian Moccasins: The Native Policies of Tommy Douglas and the CCF (1997)
- Bennett, John W. and Seena B. Kohl. Settling the Canadian-American West, 1890-1915: Pioneer Adaptation and Community Building. An Anthropological History. (1995). 311 pp. online edition
- Bliss, Jacqueline. "Seamless Lives: Pioneer Women of Saskatoon 1883-1903." Saskatchewan History 1991 43(3): 84-100
- Bowen, Dawn Suzanne. "'Forward to a Farm': The Back-to-the-Land Movement as a Relief Initiative in Saskatchewan during the Great Depression." PhD dissertation Queen's U., 1998. 279 pp. DAI 1999 59(7): 2660-A. DANQ27817 Fulltext: ProQuest Dissertations & Theses
- Calder, Alison and Wardhaugh, Robert, ed. History, Literature, and the Writing of the Canadian Prairies. U. of Manitoba Press, 2005. 310 pp.
- Carpenter, David, ed. The Literary History of Saskatchewan (Coteau Books, 2013) online.
- Clark, Jessica, and Thomas D. Isern, "Germans from Russia in Saskatchewan: An Oral History," American Review of Canadian Studies, Spring 2010, Vol. 40 Issue 1, pp 71–85
- Cottrell, Michael. "The Irish in Saskatchewan, 1850-1930: a Study of Intergenerational Ethnicity." Prairie Forum 1999 24(2): 185-209. Counting both Catholics and Protestants Irish comprised 10% of the population
- DeBrou, Dave and Moffatt, Aileen, eds. "Other" Voices: Historical Essays on Saskatchewan Women. (1995). 166 pp.
- DeClercy, Cristine. "Women and the Public Sphere in Saskatchewan, 1905-2005." Prairie Forum 2007 32(2): 357-382. ISSN 0317-6282
- Dick, Lyle. Farmers "Making Good": The Development of Abernethy District, Saskatchewan 1880-1920 (1989),
- Emery, George. The Methodist Church on the Prairies, 1896-1914. (2001). 259 pp.
- Fairbanks, C. and S.B. Sundberg. Farm Women on the Prairie Frontier. (1983)
- Friesen, Victor Carl. Where the Rivers Run: Stories of the Saskatchewan and the People Drawn to Its Shores. (2001.) 480 pp.
- Gray, James. Booze: The Impact of Whisky On the Prairie West (Toronto: Macmillan, 1972.)
- Hayden, Michael (1983). Seeking a Balance: The University of Saskatchewan, 1907-1982. Archived from the original on 2009-07-03 – via Questia.
- Hengen, Girard. "A Case Study in Urban Reform: Regina Before the First World War," Saskatchewan History 1988 41(1): 19-34
- Hewitt, Steve. Riding to the Rescue: The Transformation of the RCMP in Alberta and Saskatchewan, 1914-1939. (2006). 205 pp.
- Hinther, Rhonda L. and Jim Mochoruk, eds. Re-Imagining Ukrainian-Canadians: History, Politics, and Identity (2010)
- Hodgson, Heather, ed. Saskatchewan Writers: Lives Past and Present. Regina: Canadian Plains Research Center, 2004. 247 pp. short biographies
- Jones, David C. Empire of Dust: Settling and Abandoning the Prairie Dry Belt. (1987) 316 pp.
- Jones, Harlo L. O Little Town: Remembering Life in a Prairie Village. (1995). 236 pp. memoir of the town of Dinsmore
- Keahey, Deborah. Making It Home: Place in Canadian Prairie Literature. (1998). 178 pp.
- Korinek, Valerie. Prairie Fairies: A History of Queer Communities and People in Western Canada, 1930-1985. Toronto: University of Toronto Press, 2018.
- Lalone, Meika and LaClare, Elton. Discover Saskatchewan: A Guide to Historic Sites. (1998). 206 pp.
- Langford, N. "Childbirth on the Canadian Prairies 1880-1930." Journal of Historical Sociology, 1995. Vol. 8, No. 3, pp. 278–302.
- Langford, Nanci Louise. "First Generation and Lasting Impressions: The Gendered Identities of Prairie Homestead Women." PhD dissertation U. of Alberta 1994. 229 pp. DAI 1995 56(4): 1544-A. DANN95214 Fulltext: ProQuest Dissertations & Theses
- LaPointe, Richard and Tessier, Lucille. The Francophones of Saskatchewan: A History. Regina: U. of Regina, Campion Coll., 1988. 329 pp.
- Loewen, Royden and Frisen, Gerald. Immigrants in Prairie Cities: Ethnic Diversity in Twentieth Century Canada. Toronto: University of Toronto Press, 2009.
- Mackintosh, W. A. Prairie Settlement, the Geographical Setting (Toronto, 1934).
- Massie, Merle. Forest Prairie Edge: Place History in Saskatchewan. Winnipeg: University of Manitoba Press, 2014.
- McCourt, Edward. Saskatchewan (1968) travel
- Macpherson, Ian. "Missionaries of Rural Development: the Fieldmen of the Saskatchewan Wheat Pool, 1925-1965." Agricultural History 1986 60(2): 73-96 in JSTOR.
- Moffatt, Aileen Catherine. "Experiencing Identity: British-Canadian Women in Rural Saskatchewan, 1880-1950." PhD dissertation U. of Manitoba 1996. 324 pp. DAI 1997 58(4): 1411-A. DANN16212 Fulltext: ProQuest Dissertations & Theses
- Millions, Erin. "Breaking the Mould: a Historiographical Review of Saskatchewan Women's History, 1880-1930." Saskatchewan History 2002 54(2): 31-49.
- Olfert, M. Rose and Jack C. Stabler, "Rural Communities of the Saskatchewan Prairie Landscape." Prairie Forum 2000 25(1): 123-138. ISSN 0317-6282
- Palmer, Howard. The Settlement of the West (1977) online edition
- Parson, Edna Tyson. Land I Can Own: A Biography of Anthony Tyson and the Pioneers Who Homesteaded with Him in Neidpath, Saskatchewan (1981)
- Pitsula, James M. "Muscular Saskatchewan: Provincial Self-identity in the 1920s." Saskatchewan History 2002 54(2): 6-17.
- Rollings-Magnusson, Sandra. "Canada's Most Wanted: Pioneer Women on the Western Prairies." Canadian Review of Sociology and Anthropology 2000 37(2): 223-238. ISSN 0008-4948 Fulltext: Ebsco
- Shepard, Bruce R. Deemed Unsuitable. Toronto: Umbrella Press, 1997.
- Swyripa, Frances. Storied Landscapes: Ethno-Religious Identity and the Canadian Prairies (University of Manitoba Press, 2010) 296 pp. ISBN 978-0-88755-191-8 online review
- Taylor, Georgina M. "'Ground for Common Action': Violet McNaughton's Agrarian Feminism and the Origins of the Farm Women's Movement in Canada." PhD dissertation Carleton U. 1997. 617 pp. DAI 1998 59(4): 1300-A. DANQ26870 Fulltext: ProQuest Dissertations & Theses
- Thompson, Christian, ed. Saskatchewan First Nations: Lives Past and Present (2004), short biographies
- Thompson, John Herd. Forging the Prairie West. (1998)
- Titley, E. Brian. The Indian Commissioners: Agents of the State and Indian Policy in Canada's Prairie West, 1873-1932 (University of Alberta Press, 2009)
- Wardhaugh, Robert A., ed. Toward Defining the Prairies: Region, Culture, and History. (2001). 234 pp.
- White, Clinton O. Power For a Province: A History of Saskatchewan Power. Regina: Canadian Plains Research Center, 1976.
- Widdis, Randy William. Voices from Next Year Country: An Oral History of Rural Saskatchewan. Regina: Canadian Plains Research Centre, 2006.
- Wurtele, Susan Elizabeth. "Nation-Building from the Ground Up: Assimilation through Domestic and Community Transformation in Inter-War Saskatchewan." PhD dissertation Queen's U., 1993. 414 pp. DAI 1994 55(1): 135-A. DANN85326 Fulltext: ProQuest Dissertations & Theses

== Historiography ==
- Eisler, Dale. "The Saskatchewan Myth." in The heavy hand of history: Interpreting Saskatchewan’s past (2005): 67-85. online
- Porter, Gemma. "National History and Identity in Saskatchewan Social Studies Curriculum 1970-2008: Narratives of Diversity, Tolerance, Accommodation, and Negotiation" (Dissertation, University of Saskatchewan, 2020) online.
- Waiser, Bill. "Teaching the West and Confederation: A Saskatchewan Perspective." Canadian Historical Review 98.4 (2017): 742–764.
- Wardhaugh, Robert Alexander, Alison Calder History, literature, and the writing of the Canadian Prairies University of Manitoba Press, 2005 ISBN 0-88755-682-5

== Primary sources ==
- Hillis, Doris, ed. Plainspeaking: Interviews with Saskatchewan Writers. (1988). 304 pp.
- Kates, Jack. Don't You Know It's Forty Below? Cypress, Calif.: Seal, 2000. 451 pp. life in Sheho
- Paget, Amelia M. People of the Plains. (1909, reprint 2004). 199 pp.
- Smith, David E., ed. Building a Province: A History of Saskatchewan in Documents. Saskatoon: Fifth House, 1993. 443 pp.
- Thomas, Lewis Herbert, and T. C. Douglas. The Making of a Socialist: The Recollections of T.C. Douglas (1984) online edition

== Maps ==
- railway map (about 1931)
- Highways, (1926)
- political map (2001)
- Geological Atlas of Saskatchewan (2007)

== See also ==
- Bibliography of Canada
- Bibliography of Canadian history
- Bibliography of Nova Scotia
- Bibliography of Alberta history
- Bibliography of British Columbia
- Bibliography of the 1837-1838 insurrections in Lower Canada
- List of books about the War of 1812
