= Bibliography of Louis-Joseph Papineau =

This Bibliography of Louis-Joseph Papineau, is an incomplete list of all things written by or published about Louis-Joseph Papineau in either French or English, original or translation.

== In English ==
=== Biography ===
- "A Chronology of the Life of Louis-Joseph Papineau". Manoir-Papineau National Historic site of Canada. Parks Canada. Archived from the original on 2005-04-15.
- Brown, Thomas Storrow (January 1872). "Brief sketch of the life and times of the late Hon. Louis-Joseph Papineau". New Dominion Monthly.
- Marsh, James H (9 February 2017). "Louis-Joseph Papineau". The Canadian Encyclopedia (online ed.). Historica Canada. Archived from the original on 2008-08-27.
- O'Callaghan, Edmund Bailey (1838). "A Biographical Sketch of the Hon. Louis Joseph Papineau, Speaker of the House of Assembly of Lower Canada". Sentinel. Saratoga Springs, NY.
- Ouellet, Fernand (1972). "Papineau, Louis-Joseph". In Hayne, David (ed.). Dictionary of Canadian Biography. Vol. X (1871–1880) (online ed.). University of Toronto Press.
- Ouellet, Fernand (1961). Louis-Joseph Papineau: A Divided Soul. Canadian Historical Association.

=== Studies ===
- Peter Marshall. "George Bancroft on the Canadian Rebellions and the American Revolution," in The New England Quarterly, Vol. 63, No. 2 (Jun., 1990), pp. 302–308
- Lillian F. Gates. "A Canadian Rebel's Appeal to George Bancroft," dans The New England Quarterly, Vol. 41, No. 1 (March, 1968), pp. 96–104
- R. Howell. "The Political Testament of Papineau in Exile, 1837," in Canadian Historical Review, Vol. 38, No. 2 (sept. 1957): pp. 295–299

=== Parliamentary work ===
- An Act to declare persons of the Jewish Religion entitled to all of the rights and privileges of the other subjects of His Majesty in this Province, in the Journals of the Legislative Assembly of Lower Canada, 1832
- "The Ninety-Two Resolutions", in the Journals of the Legislative Assembly of Lower Canada, 1834

=== Other ===
- "Family Tree of Louis-Joseph Papineau," in Manoir-Papineau National Historic site of Canada, Parks Canada
- Dorothy M. Chandler. "A Genealogy of the French-Canadian Family Lines of Papineau, Dontigny-Lucas, Gaudin (Godin), Gagné", in Wisconsin's French Connections, University of Wisconsin
- "Letter from Louis J.A. Papineau to Willis P. Popenoe, May 10, 1894", in Wisconsin's French Connections, University of Wisconsin
- Anthony Papineau. Papineau Family Home Page

== In French ==
=== Written correspondence ===
- Aubin, Georges (2007). Papineau en exil à Paris. Tome I : Dictionnaire. Trois-Pistoles: Éditions Trois-Pistoles. pp. 304 pages.
- Aubin, Georges (2007). Papineau en exil à Paris. Tome II : Lettres reçues, 1839-1845. Trois-Pistoles: Éditions Trois-Pistoles. pp. 599 pages.
- Aubin, Georges (2007). Papineau en exil à Paris. Tome III : Drame rue de Provence. Trois-Pistoles: Éditions Trois-Pistoles. pp. 218 pages.
- Aubin, Georges; Renée Blanchet; Marla Arbach (2006). Louis-Joseph Papineau. Lettres à divers correspondants, Tome I : 1810-1845. Montréal: Les Éditions Varia. pp. 438 pages. ISBN 2-89606-024-3.
- Aubin, Georges; Renée Blanchet; Marla Arbach (2006). Louis-Joseph Papineau. Lettres à divers correspondants, Tome II : 1845-1871. Montréal: Les Éditions Varia. pp. 600 pages. ISBN 2-89606-027-8.
- Aubin, Georges; Renée Blanchet (2004). Louis-Joseph Papineau. Lettres à ses enfants, Tome I : 1825-1854. Montréal: Les Éditions Varia. pp. 658 pages. ISBN 2-922245-91-8.
- Aubin, Georges; Renée Blanchet (2004). Louis-Joseph Papineau. Lettres à ses enfants, Tome II : 1855-1871. Montréal: Les Éditions Varia. pp. 758 pages. ISBN 2-922245-92-6.
- Aubin, Georges; Renée Blanchet (2000). Louis-Joseph Papineau, Lettres à Julie. Québec: Archives nationales du Québec. pp. 814 pages. ISBN 2-89448-165-9.

=== Speech, addresses, public letters ===
- Aubin, Georges (2003). Louis-Joseph Papineau. Cette fatale Union. Adresses, discours et manifestes 1847-1848. Montréal: Lux éditeur. pp. 223 pages. ISBN 2-89596-009-7.
- Aubin, Georges (2001). Louis-Joseph Papineau. Histoire de la résistance du Canada au gouvernement anglais. Montréal: Comeau & Nadeau. pp. 82 pages. ISBN 2-89596-009-7.
- Lamonde, Yvan; Claude Larin (1998). Louis-Joseph Papineau. Un demi-siècle de combats. Interventions publiques. Montréal: Éditions Fides. pp. 662 pages. ISBN 2-7621-2008-X.
- Louis-Joseph Papineau. Histoire de l'insurrection du Canada, Montréal, Éditions Leméac, 1968, 104 p.
- Fernand Ouellet. "Papineau; textes choisis", in Cahiers de l'institut d’histoire, 1, Québec, 1964
- Louis-Joseph Papineau. Un testament politique, volume 150, edition of the La Bibliothèque électronique du Québec, 2003 (PDF)
- "Discours de Louis-Joseph Papineau", in L'Encyclopédie de l'Agora

=== Biographies, studies ===
- Denis Aubert. "Louis-Joseph PAPINEAU (1786-1871) une esquisse biographique", in the Web site Les Projets DA-GO, June 24, 2006
- Nathalie Dubois. "L'exil de Louis-Joseph Papineau (1837-1845)", in the Web site Les Patriotes de 1837@1838, May 19, 2001
- Marguerite Paulin (2000). Louis-Joseph Papineau, Le grand tribun, le pacifiste, Éditions XYZ, Montréal, ISBN 2-89261-280-2
- Marc Chevrier. "Le provincialisme, ou l'indolence politique", dans Liberté, volume 40, no. 6, December 1998, p. 4-23
- Michel Bédard (1993) Louis-Joseph Papineau : synthèse préliminaire des connaissances sur l'homme politique et le seigneur, Québec, Parcs Canada 359 p.
- Fernand Ippersiel (1990). Les cousins ennemis : Louis-Joseph Papineau et Jean-Jacques Lartigue, Montréal, Guérin littérature
- Ruth L. White (1983). Louis-Joseph Papineau et Lamennais. le chef des Patriotes Canadiens à Paris, 1839-1845. avec correspondence et documents inédits., Montréal, Hurtubise HMH ISBN 2-89045-524-6
- Robert Rumilly (1977). Papineau et son temps, Fides, 2 volumes
- Fernand Ouellet. "Papineau et la rivalité Québec-Montréal (1820–1840)", in Revue d'histoire de l'Amérique française, XIII, 1959, pp. 311–327
- Robert Rumilly (1944). Papineau, Montréal, B. Valiquette 281 p.
- Ève Circé-Côté (1924). Papineau, son influence sur la pensée canadienne : essai de psychologie historique, Montréal, R.A. Regnault
- Lionel Groulx. "Louis-Joseph Papineau, l'homme politique", in Notre maître, le passé, 1924, pp. 189–211
- Alfred Duclos De Celles (1905). Papineau, 1786–1871, Montréal, Librairie Beauchemin
- Laurent-Olivier David (1896). Les deux Papineau, Montréal, Eusèbe Sénécal
- Laurent-Olivier David (1872). L'Honorable Louis-Joseph Papineau, Montréal, Typographie Geo. E. Desbarats (PDF edited by La Bibliothèque électronique du Québec)
- "Louis-Joseph Papineau" in the Web site of the Québec National Assembly
- "Dossier Louis-Joseph Papineau", in L'Encyclopédie de l'Agora

=== Tribute ===
- Louis Fréchette. "Papineau", in Pêle-mêle: fantaisies et souvenirs poétiques, Montréal, Compagnie d'impression et de publication Lovell, 1877, p. 15-22 (poem)
- Louis Fréchette. Papineau, edition of La Bibliothèque électronique du Québec (play)

=== Others ===
- François Labonté (2004). Alias Anthony St. John. Les patriotes Canadiens aux États-Unis, décembre 1837 - mai 1838, Sainte-Foy, Presses de l'Université Laval ISBN 2-7637-8139-X
- Yvan Lamonde and Claude Larin (1998). "Bibliographie chronologique des études sur Louis-Joseph Papineau", in Louis-Joseph Papineau. Un demi-siècle de combats. Interventions publiques, Éditions Fides, pages 656-662 (covers all works published between 1871 and 1997)
- Louis-Joseph Papineau - Le demi-dieu, documentary of the NFB directed by Louis-Georges Carrier, scenario by Guy Dufresne, 1961, 26 min 08
- Jean-Normand Pickering-LeBlanc (Johnny-Normand Pickering alias) «Le Mémorial Papineau». Montréal, Éditions du Fleuve, 1989. 184 p. (23 cm). Illustrations et tableaux.
