= Bibliography of British Columbia =

This is a short bibliography of major works on the History of British Columbia.

== Surveys ==
- Barman, Jean. The West Beyond the West: A History of British Columbia U. of Toronto Press, 1991. 430pp
- Francis, Daniel, ed. Encyclopedia of British Columbia. Madeira Park, B.C.: Harbour, 2000. 806 pp.
- Griffin, Harold. Radical Roots: The Shaping of British Columbia. Vancouver: Commonwealth Fund, 1999.
- Johnston, Hugh, ed. The Pacific Province: A History of British Columbia. (Douglas & McIntyre, 1996). 352 pp.
- McGillivray, Brett. Geography of British Columbia: People and Landscapes in Transition (U. of British Columbia Press, 2000). 235pp
- Ormsby, Margaret A. British Columbia: A History (Macmillan, 1958) online edition
- Recksten, Terry. The Illustrated History of British Columbia. Vancouver: Douglas & McIntyre, 2001. 280 pp.
- Roy, Patricia; Thompson, John. British Columbia: Land of Promises. Oxford University Press, 2005. 216 pp. ISBN 9780195410488
- Woodcock, George. British Columbia: A History of the Province. Vancouver: Douglas & McIntyre, 1990. 288 pp.
- Walbran, Captain John T. British Columbia Coast Names: 1592–1906 Their Origin and History. Vancouver. Douglas & McIntyre. 1971. ISBN 0-295-97142-8

=== Prehistory and First Nations ===
- Boas, Franz Kwakiutl Ethnography. Chicago. University of Chicago Press. 1966.
- Cannon, Aubrey The Economic Prehistory of Namu. Burnaby, BC; Archaeology Press. 1991
- Carlson, Roy L. and Bona, Luke Dalla, eds. Early Human Occupation in British Columbia. Vancouver: U. of British Columbia Press, 1996. 261 pp.
- McDowell, Jim. Hamatsa: The Enigma of Cannibalism on the Pacific Northwest Coast. Vancouver: Ronsdale, 1997. 297 pp.
- Muckle, Robert J. The First Nations of British Columbia. Vancouver: U. of British Columbia Press, 1998. 146pp.
- Stewart, Hilary Looking at Indian Art of the Northwest Coast. Vancouver. Douglas & McIntyre. 1979. ISBN 0-88894-229-X
- Suttles, Wayne, ed. Handbook of North American Indians: Volume 7 Northwest Coast. Washington. Smithsonian Institution. 1990.
- Turner, Nancy J. Plant Technology of First Peoples in British Columbia. Vancouver; UBC Press, 1998.

== Empire and Settlement and pre-1871 ==
- Bancroft, Hubert Howe. History of British Columbia (1887) online
- Harris, Cole. The Resettlement of British Columbia: Essays on Colonialism and Geographical Change. (U. of British Columbia Press, 1997). 314 pp.
- Hayes, Derek. Historical Atlas of British Columbia and the Pacific Northwest: Maps of Exploration. Vancouver: Cavendish, 1999. 208 pp.
- Loo, Tina. Making Law, Order, and Authority in British Columbia, 1821–1871. (U. of Toronto Press, 1994). 239 pp.
- Sterne, Netta. Fraser Gold, 1858! The Founding of British Columbia. (Washington State U. Press, 1998). 187 pp.
- Thomas, Edward Harper Chinook: A History and Dictionary. Portland Ore. Bindfords & Mort. 1935. ISBN 0-8323-0217-1

== Colonization and First Nations ==
- Brody, Hugh Maps and Dreams: Indians and the British Columbia Frontier. Vancouver. Douglas & McIntyre. 1981. ISBN 0-88894-593-0
- Cole, Douglas & Ira Chaiken. An Iron Hand Upon the People: The Law Against the Potlatch on the Northwest Coast. Vancouver/Toronto. Douglas &McIntyre. 1990.
- Harkin, Michael E. The Heiltsuks: Dialogues of Culture and History on the Northwest Coast. Lincoln. University of Nebraska Press. 1997.
- Harris, Douglas C. Fish, Law, and Colonialism: The Legal Capture of Salmon in British Columbia. Toronto. University of Toronto Press. 2001. ISBN 0-8020-8453-2
- Newell, Diane Tangled Webs of History: Indians and the Law in Canada's Pacific Coast Fisheries. Toronto. University of Toronto Press. 1993. ISBN 0-8020-7746-3

== Economics, business and labour ==
- Battien, Pauline. The Gold Seekers: A Two Hundred-Year History of Mining in Washington, Idaho, Montana and Lower British Columbia. Fairfield, Wash.: Ye Galleon, 1989. 265 pp.
- BC Hydro Power Pioneers. Gaslights to Gigawatts: A Human History of BC Hydro and its Predecessor. Vancouver: Hurricane, 1998. 236 pp.
- Drushka, Ken. Tie Hackers to Timber Harvesters: The History of Logging in the BC Interior. Madeira Park, B.C.: Harbour, 1998. 200 pp.
- Drushka, Ken. Working in the Woods: A History of Logging on the West Coast. Madeira Park, B.C.: Harbour, 1992. 304 pp.
- Mackie, Richard Somerset. Trading Beyond the Mountains: The British Fur Trade on the Pacific, 1793–1843. Vancouver: U. of British Columbia Press, 1997. 420 pp.
- Hak, Gordon. Turning Trees into Dollars: The British Columbia Coastal Lumber Industry, 1858–1913. U. of Toronto Press, 2000. 239 pp.
- Kesselman, Amy. Fleeting Opportunities: Women Shipyard Workers in Portland and Vancouver during World War II and Reconversion. Albany: State U. of New York Press, 1990. 192 pp.
- Knight, Rolf. Indians at Work: An Informal History of Native Indian Labour in British Columbia 1858–1930. Vancouver. New Star Books. 1978.
- Leonard, Frank. A Thousand Blunders: The Grand Trunk Pacific Railway and Northern British Columbia. Vancouver: U. of British Columbia Press, 1996. 344pp.

== Environment and geography ==
- Cail Robert E. Land, Man and the Law: The Disposal of Crown Lands in British Columbia, 1871–1913 (U. of British Columbia Press, 1974)
- Cannings Richard, and Sydney Cannings. British Columbia: A Natural History (Vancouver: Greystone Books 1996)
- Day, J. C., and Richard Stace-Smith, eds. British Columbia Land For Wildlife: Past, Present, Future (Victoria: Ministry of Environment, Fish and Wildlife Branch, 1982)
- McGillivray, Brett. Geography of British Columbia: People and Landscapes in Transition (U. of British Columbia Press, 2000). 235pp
- Wilson, Jeremy (1998). Talk and Log: Wilderness Politics in British Columbia, 1965-96. University of British Columbia Press. Archived from the original on 2012-11-03 – via Questia.

== Political ==
- Carty, R. K., ed. Politics, Policy, and Government in British Columbia. (U. of British Columbia Press, 1996). 381 pp.
- Clayton, Daniel W. Islands of Truth: The Imperial Fashioning of Vancouver Island. U. of British Columbia Press, 2000. 330 pp.
- Mitchell, David J. Succession: The Political Reshaping of British Columbia. Vancouver: Douglas & McIntyre, 1987. 201 pp.
- Resnick, Philip. The Politics of Resentment: British Columbia Regionalism and Canadian Unity. Vancouver: U. of British Columbia Press, 2000. 172pp
- Verchere, David R. A Progression of Judges: A History of the Supreme Court of British Columbia. Vancouver: U. of British Columbia Press, 1988. 196pp.

== Regional and cities ==
- Davis, Chuck, ed. The Greater Vancouver Book: An Urban Encyclopedia. Vancouver: Linkman, 1997. 882 pp.
- Dunford, Muriel Poulton. North River: The Story of BC's North Thompson Valley and Yellowhead Highway 5. Merritt, B.C.: Sonotek, 2000. 384 pp.
- Furniss, Elizabeth. The Burden of History: Colonialism and the Frontier Myth in a Rural Canadian Community. Vancouver: U. of British Columbia Press, 1999. 237 pp.
- Leonard, David W. Delayed Frontier: The Peace River Country to 1909. Calgary, Alta.: Detselig, 1995. 256 pp.
- Sandwell, R. W., ed. Beyond the City Limits: Rural History in British Columbia. Vancouver: U. of British Columbia Press., 1999. 293pp.
- Wynn, Graeme and Oke, Timothy, eds. Vancouver and Its Region. Vancouver: U. of British Columbia Press, 1992. 333pp.

== Society, gender, race ==
- Belshaw John Douglas. Becoming British Columbia: A Population History (UBC Press 2009)
- Boschma, Geertje. "Deinstitutionalization reconsidered: geographic and demographic changes in mental health care in British Columbia and Alberta, 1950-1980." Histoire sociale/Social history 44.2 (2011): 223-256 online.
- Creese, Gillian and Strong-Boag, Veronica, eds. British Columbia Reconsidered: Essays on Women. Vancouver: Press Gang; U. of British Columbia, Center for Research in Women's Studies and Gender Relations, 1992. 454 pp.
- Kesselman, Amy. Fleeting Opportunities: Women Shipyard Workers in Portland and Vancouver during World War II and Reconversion. Albany: State U. of New York Press, 1990. 192 pp.
- Norris, John. Strangers Entertained: A History of Ethnic Groups in British Columbia. Vancouver: Evergreen Press, 1971. 254 pp.
- Perry, Adele. On the Edge of Empire: Gender, Race, and the Making of British Columbia, 1849–1871. (U. of Toronto Press, 2001). 360 pp.
- Roy, Patricia E. A White Man's Province: British Columbia Politicians and Chinese and Japanese Immigrants, 1858–1914. (U. of British Columbia Press, 1989). 327pp.
- Roy, Patricia; Granatstein, J. L.; Iino, Masaka; and Takamura, Hiroko. Mutual Hostages: Canadian and Japanese during the Second World War. (U. of Toronto Press, 1990). 282 pp.
- Sandwell, R.W., ed. (1998). Beyond the City Limits: Rural History in British Columbia. Vancouver, B.C.: UNC Press. Archived from the original on 2012-11-21 – via Questia.
- Thomas, Edward Harper. Chinook: A History and Dictionary. Portland, Ore. Bin fords & Mort. 1935. ISBN 0-8323-0217-1

== Culture and arts ==
- Barman, Jean; Sutherland, Neil; and Wilson, J. Donald, eds. Children, Teachers and Schools in the History of British Columbia. Calgary, Alta.: Detselig, 1995. 426 pp.
- Burkinshaw, Robert K. Pilgrims in Lotus Land: Conservative Protestantism in British Columbia, 1917–1981. Montreal: McGill-Queen's U. Press, 1995. 353 pp.
- Christophers, Brett. Positioning the Missionary: John Booth Good and the Confluence of Cultures in Nineteenth-Century British Columbia. Vancouver: U. of British Columbia Press, 1998. 200pp.
- Fleming, Thomas, ed. School Leadership: Essays on the British Columbia Experience, 1872–1995. Mill Bay, BC: Bendall, 2001. 427 pp.
- Inverarity, Robert Bruce Art of the Northwest Coast Indians. Berkeley. University of California Press. 1950. ISBN 0-520-00595-3
- Jensen, Doreen & Polly Sargent Robes of Power: Totem Poles on Cloth. Vancouver. University of British Columbia Press. 1986. ISBN 0-7748-0264-2
- McIntosh, Dale. History of Music in British Columbia, 1850–1950. Victoria, B.C.: Sono Nis, 1989. 296 pp.
- Samuels, Cheryl The Raven's Tail. Vancouver. University of British Columbia Press. 1987. ISBN 0-7748-0224-3
- Wilson, Lyle Paint: The Painted Works of Lyle Wilson. Maple Ridge Pitt Meadows Arts Council. Maple Ridge, BC. 2012. ISBN 978-0-9878998-0-4

== Historiography ==
- Leir, Mark, 'W[h]ither Labour History? Regionalism, Class and the Writing of BC History'; Bryan Palmer, 'Class and the Writing of History: Beyond BC'; Veronica Strong-Boag, 'Moving Beyond Tired Truths: Or, Let's Not Fight the Old Battles'; Robert A. J. McDonald, 'The West is a Messy Place'; and Mark Leir, "Response to Professors Palmer, Strong-Boag, and McDonald" in BC Studies 111 (Autumn 1996): 61–98.
- Reimer, Chad. Writing British Columbia History, 1784–1958 (2009), 206pp

== Primary sources ==
- Hazlitt, William Carew. British Columbia and Vancouver Island (1858), described by Reimer (2009) as part imperial history, part promotional literature.
- Mayne, Richard. Four Years in British Columbia and Vancouver Island (1862)

== See also ==
- Bibliography of Canada
- Bibliography of Canadian history
- Bibliography of Nova Scotia
- Bibliography of Saskatchewan history
- Bibliography of Alberta history
- Bibliography of the 1837-1838 insurrections in Lower Canada
- List of books about the War of 1812
