= Bibliography of Alberta history =

The following is a bibliography of Alberta history.

== Surveys and reference ==
- "Alberta Online Encyclopedia". Heritage Community Foundation. 2009., a short encyclopedia
- "The Canadian Encyclopedia". Historica Canada. 2008. a very good starting point
- "The Dictionary of Canadian Biography". University of Toronto/Université Laval. 2017. scholarly biographies of every important person who died by 1930
- Cashman, Tony (197). A Picture History of Alberta. Edmonton, Alberta: Hurtig. ISBN 978-0-88830-157-4.
- Friesen, Gerald (1987). The Canadian Prairies: A History (student ed.). University of Toronto Press. ISBN 978-0-8020-6648-0.
- MacGregor, James Grierson (1972). A History of Alberta. Hurtig. ISBN 978-0-88830-063-8.
- Owram, Doug; Macleod, R. C., eds. (1979). The Formation of Alberta: a documentary history. Alberta Records Publication Board, Historical Society of Alberta. ISBN 978-0-88864-987-4. primary sources
- Palmer, Howard; Palmer, Tamara (1990). Alberta: A New History. Hurtig Publishers. ISBN 978-0-88830-340-0., standard survey by leading historian
- Payne, Michael; Wetherell, Donald; Cavanaugh, Catherine, eds. (2006). Alberta formed, Alberta transformed. Vol. 1. Edmonton: University of Alberta Press. ISBN 978-1-55238-194-6.
- Payne, Michael; Wetherell, Donald; Cavanaugh, Catherine, eds. (2006). Alberta formed, Alberta transformed. Vol. 2. Edmonton: University of Alberta Press. ISBN 978-1-55238-194-6.
- Pitsula, James M. (2005). "Disparate Duo". The Beaver. 85 (4): 14–24., a comparison with Saskatchewan, Fulltext in EBSCO
- Herk, Aritha Van (2001). Mavericks: An Incorrigable History Of Alberta. Penguin Canada. ISBN 978-0-14-317695-4. OL 7643613M. 14 popular essays on the fur trade, aboriginal peoples, exploration, the North-West Mounted Police, ranchers, homesteaders, territorial and provincial politics, women, and Albertan culture.
- Wardhaugh, Robert, ed. (2001). Toward Defining the Prairies: Region, Culture, and History. University of Manitoba Press. ISBN 978-0-88755-388-2.

== Economics, business, labour ==
- Ascah, Robert L. (1999). Politics and Public Debt: The Dominion, the Banks and Alberta's Social Credit. University of Alberta Press. ISBN 978-0-88864-306-3.
- Bercuson, David Jay, ed. (1978). Alberta's Coal Industry, 1919. Alberta Records Publication Board: Historical Society of Alberta. 1919 primary source
- Breen, David (1993). Alberta's Petroleum Industry and the Conservation Board. University of Alberta. ISBN 978-0-88864-245-5. OL 1166756M.
- Breen, David H., ed. (1984). William Stewart Herron: Father of the Petroleum Industry in Alberta. Calgary: Alberta Records Publication Board: Historical Society of Alberta. OCLC 1132018842. primary sources
- Bright, David (1998). The Limits of Labour: Class Formation and the Labour Movement in Calgary, 1883-1929. UBC Press. ISBN 978-0-7748-4166-5. OL 9849978M.Online
- Burrill, Gary (1992). Away. Maritimers in Massachusetts, Ontario and Alberta: An Oral History of Leaving Home. McGill-Queen's University Press. ISBN 978-0-7735-0899-6. JSTOR j.ctt819s3. A primary source; interviews with oil workers
- Chastko, Paul Anthony (2004). Developing Alberta's Oil Sands: From Karl Clark to Kyoto. University of Calgary Press. ISBN 978-1-55238-124-3. OL 3452312M. Author's discussion
- Ferguson, Barry Glen (1986). Athabasca oil sands: northern resource exploration, 1875-1951. Alberta Culture. ISBN 978-0-88977-039-3.
- Hart, E. J. (1983). The selling of Canada: the CPR and the beginnings of Canadian tourism. Altitude Pub. ISBN 978-0-919381-09-4.
- Hayward, Anne. Alberta pottery industry, 1912-1990: A social and economic history (University of Ottawa Press, 2001).
- House, J. D.; Studies, Carleton University. Institute of Canadian (1980). The last of the free enterprisers: the oilmen of Calgary. Macmillan of Canada. ISBN 978-0-7705-1846-2.
- Johnston, Alex; Gladwyn, Keith G.; Ellis, L. Gregory (1989). Lethbridge, its coal industry. Lethbridge Historical Society. ISBN 978-0-919224-81-0.
- Kennedy, Margaret Anne (1997). The Whiskey Trade of the Northwestern Plains: A Multidisciplinary Study. P. Lang. ISBN 978-0-8204-2596-2. OL 1105516M.
- Klassen, Henry C. (1999). A Business History of Alberta. University of Calgary Press. ISBN 978-1-55238-022-2.
- Parker, James McPherson (1987). Emporium of the north: Fort Chipewyan and the fur trade to 1835. Alberta Culture and Multiculturalism and University of Regina - Canadian Plains Research Center. ISBN 978-0-88977-044-7.
- Richards, John; Pratt, Larry (1979). Prairie capitalism: power and influence in the New West. McClelland and Stewart. ISBN 978-0-7710-7177-5. influential Marxist interpretation
- Schneider, Ena (1991). Ribbons of Steel: The Story of the Northern Alberta Railways. Calgary: Detselig. ISBN 978-1-5505-9239-9.
- Wetherell, Donald Grant; Kmet, Irene (1990). Useful Pleasures: The Shaping of Leisure in Alberta, 1896-1945. Alberta Culture and Multiculturalism and University of Regina - Canadian Plains Research Center. ISBN 9780889770584.
- Thompson, John Herd, and Allen Seager. "Workers, Growers and Monopolists: The" Labour Problem" in the Alberta Beet Sugar Industry During the 1930s." Labour/Le Travail (1978): 153–174. online

=== Medical ===
- Boschma, Geertje (January 2012). "Community mental health nursing in Alberta, Canada: An oral history". Nursing History Review. 20 (1): 103–135. doi:10.1891/1062-8061.20.103. PMID 22360000.
- Boschma, Geertje (November 2011). "Deinstitutionalization reconsidered: geographic and demographic changes in mental health care in British Columbia and Alberta, 1950-1980". Histoire sociale/Social history. 44 (88): 223–256. doi:10.1353/his.2011.0020. PMID 22512051.
- Boschma, Geertje (2020). ""You Had To Just Kind Of Rub Her Cheek": Memories and Emotions of Mental Deficiency Nurses in Alberta, Canada, 1945-1975". Quality Advancement in Nursing Education-Avancées en formation infirmière. 6 (2). Article 5. doi:10.17483/2368-6669.1247.
- Burnett, Kristin (2010). Taking medicine: women's healing work and colonial contact in southern Alberta, 1880-1930. UBC Press. ISBN 978-0-7748-1828-5.
- Corbet, Elise (1990). Frontiers of Medicine: A History of Medical Education and Research at the University of Alberta. University of Alberta. And Frontiers of Medicine at Google Books
- Smith, Mary; Khanlou, Nazilla (28 April 2013). "An Analysis of Canadian psychiatric mental health nursing through the junctures of history, gender, nursing education, and quality of work life in Ontario, Manitoba, Alberta, and Saskatchewan". International Scholarly Research Notices: 1–13. doi:10.1155/2013/184024. PMC 3655684. PMID 23710367.

== First Nations, Metis ==
- Drees, Laurie Meijer (2002). The Indian Association of Alberta: A History of Political Action. University of British Columbia Press. ISBN 978-0-7748-0877-4.
- McClintock, Walter (1910). The Old North Trail: Or, Life, Legends and Religion of the Blackfeet Indians. London: Macmillan and Company.; and The Old North Trail: Life, Legends, and Religion of the Blackfeet Indians at Google Books
- Pocklington, T.C. (1991). The Government and Politics of the Alberta Metis Settlements. Canadian Plains Research Center, University of Regina Press. ISBN 978-0-88977-060-7.
- Price, Richard, ed. (1999). The Spirit of the Alberta Indian Treaties (third ed.). University of Alberta. ISBN 978-0-88864-327-8.
- Samek, Hana (1987). The Blackfoot Confederacy 1880-1920: A Comparative Study of Canadian and U.S. Indian Policy. University of New Mexico Press. ISBN 978-0-8263-5069-5.
- Ward, Donald Bruce (1995). The People: A Historical Guide to the First Nations of Alberta, Saskatchewan and Manitoba. Fifth House. ISBN 978-1-895618-56-3.

== High culture ==
- Ainslie, Patricia; LaViolette, Mary-Beth (2007). Alberta Art and Artists: An Overview. Fitzhenry & Whiteside. ISBN 9781894856614.
- Calder, Alison; Wardhaugh, Robert, eds. (2005). History, Literature and the Writing of the Canadian Prairies. University of Manitoba Press. ISBN 978-0-88755-324-0.
- Keahey, Deborah (1998). Making it Home: Place in Canadian Prairie Literature. University of Manitoba Press. ISBN 978-0-88755-341-7.
- Johns, Walter Hugh (1981). A History of the University of Alberta, 1908-1969. University of Alberta. ISBN 978-0-88864-025-3.
- Melnyk, George (1998). The Literary History of Alberta: From Writing-on-Stone to World War Two. University of Alberta. ISBN 978-0-88864-296-7.
- Melnyk, George (1998). The Literary History of Alberta: From the end of the war to the end of the century. University of Alberta. ISBN 978-0-88864-324-7.

== Politics and government ==
- Aberhart, William (1991). Elliott, David R. (ed.). Aberhart: Outpourings and Replies. Calgary: Historical Society of Alberta. ISBN 1-895379-08-3. - Primary Source
- Barr, John J. (1974). The dynasty : the rise and fall of social credit in Alberta. Toronto: McClelland and Stewart. ISBN 0-7710-1015-X.
- Bell, Edward (1993). Social Classes and Social Credit in Alberta. McGill-Queens's University Press. ISBN 0-7735-1169-5.
- Boudreau, Joseph A., ed. Alberta, Aberhart and Social Credit. Canadian History Through the Press. Holt, Rinehart and Winston of Canada, 1975. 122 pp. - newspaper reports; primary source
- Bruce, Christopher; Kneebone, Ronald; McKenzie, Kenneth, eds. (1997). A Government Reinvented: A Study of Alberta's Deficit Elimination Program. Toronto: Oxford University Press. ISBN 0-19-541269-9.
- Caldarola, Carlo, ed. Society and Politics in Alberta: Research Papers. Toronto: Methuen, 1979. 392 pp.
- Elliott, David R. and Iris Miller. Bible Bill: A Biography of William Aberhart. Edmonton: Reidmore Books, 1987. 373 pp.
- Finkel, Alvin (1989). The Social Credit Phenomenon in Alberta (State and Economic Life). Toronto: University of Toronto Press. ISBN 0-8020-5821-3.
- Gray, James Henry (1991). R.B. Bennett: the Calgary years. Toronto & Buffalo: University of Toronto Press. ISBN 978-0-8020-5975-8.
- Hesketh, Bob. Major Douglas and Alberta Social Credit. U. of Toronto Press, 1997. 315 pp.
- Hewitt, Steve. Riding to the Rescue: The Transformation of the RCMP in Alberta and Saskatchewan, 1914-1939. (2006). 205 pp. excerpt and text search
- Johnson, William (2005). Stephen Harper and the Future of Canada. Douglas Gibson Books. ISBN 978-0-7710-4350-5. OL 8075861M.
- Lin, Zhiqiu (2007). Policing the Wild North-West: A Sociological Study of the Provincial Police in Alberta and Saskatchewan, 1905-32. Archived from the original on March 8, 2016 – via Questia.
- Masson, Jack K. (1994). Alberta's Local Governments: Politics and Democracy. Edmonton: University of Alberta Press. ISBN 0-88864-251-2.
- Mardon, Ernest, and Austin Mardon. Alberta Election Results 1882–1992. Edmonton: Documentary Heritage Society of Alberta (1993).
- Monto, Tom. The United Farmers of Alberta: A Movement, A Government (Edmonton: GranhPublishing, 1989)
- Rennie, Bradford James, ed. (2004). Alberta Premiers of the Twentieth Century. Regina, Saskatchewan: Canadian Plains Research Center, University of Regina. ISBN 0-88977-151-0.
- Rennie, James Bradford (2000). The Rise of Agrarian Democracy: The United Farmers and Farm Women of Alberta, 1909-1921. Toronto: University of Toronto Press. ISBN 0-8020-8374-9.
- Raymaker, Darryl (2017). Trudeau's tango: Alberta meets Pierre Elliott Trudeau, 1968-1972. Edmonton: University of Alberta Press. ISBN 978-1-77212-265-7.
- Thomas, Lewis H., ed. William Aberhart and Social Credit in Alberta. Toronto: Copp Clark, 1977. 175 pp. readings
- Thomas, Lewis Gwynne (1959). The Liberal Party in Alberta. Toronto: University of Toronto Press. ISBN 0-8020-5083-2. OL 18824816M.
- Tupper, Allan; Gibbins, Roger, eds. (1992). Government and Politics in Alberta. Edmonton: University of Alberta Press. ISBN 0-88864-243-1. - Textbook
- Walchuk, Walter (1987). Alberta's local governments: people in community seeking goodness. Edmonton: Municipal Administrative Services Division, Alberta Municipal Affairs. ISBN 978-0-7732-0014-2.

== Regional, urban, environment ==
- Belliveau, Anne. The Story of Alberta's Big West Country: Upper North Saskatchewan River Corridor, Shunda Basin, Brazeau Collieries and Nordegg. Calgary: Detselig, 1999. 240 pp.
- Conrad, Norman C. (1999). Reading the Entrails: An Alberta Ecohistory. Calgary, Alta.: University of Calgary Press. ISBN 9781552380123.
- Foran, Max; Jameson, Sheilagh S., eds. (1987). Citymakers: Calgarians after the Frontier. Historical Society of Alberta. ISBN 0-88925-725-6.
- Foran, Max; Foran, Heather MacEwan (1982). Calgary, Canada's Frontier Metropolis an Illustrated History. Windsor, Ont.: Windsor Publications Inc. ISBN 978-0-89781-055-5.
- Foran, Max. Calgary: An Illustrated History/Calgary: Histoire Illustrée. Toronto: Lorimer; Ottawa: Natl. Mus. of Man, 1978. 192 pp.
- Hesketh, Bob; Swyripa, Frances, eds. (1995). Edmonton: The Life of a City. Edmonton, Alta.: NeWest. ISBN 1-896300-02-2.
- Johnston, Alex (1985). Lethbridge: A Centennial History. City of Lethbridge & Historical Society of Alberta. ISBN 0-919224-42-3.
- MacDonald, Graham A. Where the Mountains Meet the Prairies: A History of Waterton Country. (Parks and Heritage Series, No. 3.) U. of Calgary Press, 2000. 210 pp.
- Melnyk, Bryan P. Calgary Builds: The Emergence of an Urban Landscape, 1905-1914. Calgary: Alberta Culture, Can. Plains Res. Center, 1985. 214 pp.
- Rasporich, Anthony W.; Klassen, Henry C. (1975). Frontier Calgary: Town, City, and Region 1875-1914. Calgary, Alta.: University of Calgary & McClelland and Stewart West. ISBN 0-7712-1017-5.
- Reasons, Charles E., ed. (1984). Stampede City: Power and Politics in the West. Toronto: Between the Lines. ISBN 0-919946-46-1. - impact of oil on Calgary
- Smith, Donald B. (1994). Centennial City: Calgary, 1894-1994. Calgary, Alta.: University of Calgary. ISBN 1-895176-57-3.
- Taft, Kevin (2017). Oil's Deep State: How the Petroleum Industry Undermines Democracy and Stops Action on Global Warming -- in Alberta, and in Ottawa. James Lorimer & Company. ISBN 978-1-4594-0999-6.
- Timoney, Kevin P., and Peter Lee. "Does the Alberta tar sands industry pollute? The scientific evidence." The Open Conservation Biology Journal 3.1 (2009) online.
- Wetherell, Donald G.; Kmet, Irene R. A. (2000). Alberta's North: A History, 1890-1950. University of Alberta Press. ISBN 0-88864-342-X.
- Wetherell, Donald G.; Kmet, Irene R. A. (1995). Town Life: Main Street and the Evolution of Small Town Alberta, 1880-1947. University of Alberta Press.

== Settlement, rural, pioneers ==
- Baker, William M., ed. (1993). Pioneer Policing in Southern Alberta: Deane of the Mounties, 1888-1914. Calgary: Historical Society of Alberta. ISBN 0-929123-02-6.
- Bennett, John W.; Kohl, Seena B. (1995). Settling the Canadian-American West, 1890-1915: Pioneer Adaptation and Community Building. An Anthropological History. Lincoln, NE: U. of Nebraska Press. Archived from the original on 2012-11-02 – via Questia.
- Bowen, Lynne (1992). Muddling Through: The Remarkable Story of the Barr Colonists. Vancouver: Douglas & McIntyre. ISBN 1-55054-053-X.
- Brado, Edward. Cattle Kingdom: Early Ranching in Alberta. Vancouver: Douglas & McIntyre, 1984. 298 pp.
- Brunvand, Jan Harold (1974). Norwegian Settlers in Alberta. National Museum of Man, Mercury Series, Canadian Centre for Folk Cultural Studies, Paper no. 8. Ottawa: National Museum of Man.
- Danysk, Cecilia (1995). Hired Hands: Labour and the Development of Prairie Agriculture, 1880-1930. Toronto: McClelland & Stewart Inc. ISBN 0-7710-2552-1.
- Hurt, Leslie J. The Victoria Settlement, 1862-1922. Occasional Paper, no. 7. Edmonton: Alberta Culture, Hist. Resources Division, 1979. 242 pp.
- Jaques, Carrol (2001). Unifarm: A Story of Conflict and Change. University of Calgary Press. ISBN 1-55238-051-3.
- Jones, David C. Empire of Dust: Settling and Abandoning the Prairie Dry Belt. U. of Nebraska Press, 1987. 330 pp.
- Jones, David C., ed. "We'll All Be Buried Down Here": The Prairie Dryland Disaster, 1917-1926. Calgary: Alberta Records Publ. Board; Hist. Soc. of Alberta, 1986. 200 pp. collects primary sources
- Leonard, David W. Delayed Frontier: The Peace River Country to 1909. Calgary, Alta.: Detselig, 1995. 256 pp.
- Palmer, Howard (1977). The Settlement of the West. Archived from the original on 2012-10-22 – via Questia.
- Rennie, Bradford James. The Rise of Agrarian Democracy: The United Farmers and Farm Women of Alberta, 1909-1921. U of Toronto Press, 2000. 282 pp.
- Gross, Renie. Groundwork: Carl Anderson, Farm Crusader. Wardlow, Alta.: Badlands Books, 1998. 352 pp.
- Jackson, Mary Percy. Suitable for the Wilds: Letters from Northern Alberta, 1929-1931. ed. by Janice Dickin McGinnis, Toronto: U. of Toronto Press, 1995. 264 pp.; a primary source
- Sharp, Paul F. Whoop-up Country: The Canadian-American West, 1865-1885. Reprint ed., Norman: U. of Oklahoma Press, 1973. 347pp. primary source
- Silverman, Eliane Leslau. The Last Best West: Women on the Alberta Frontier 1880-1930. Montreal: Eden, 1984. 183 pp.
- Thompson, John Herd. Forging the Prairie West. (1998)
- Voisey, Paul. Vulcan: The Making of a Prairie Community. Toronto: U. of Toronto Press, 1987. 341 pp.

== Social, ethnic, religion and schools ==
- Banack, Clark (Spring 2014). "Evangelical Christianity and Political Thought in Alberta.'". Journal of Canadian Studies. 48 (2): 70–99. doi:10.3138/jcs.48.2.70. S2CID 145237154.
- Byrne, M. B. From the Buffalo to the Cross: A History of the Roman Catholic Diocese of Calgary. Calgary Archdiocese. 555 pp.
- Cavanaugh, Catherine A. and Warne, Randi R., ed. Standing on New Ground: Women in Alberta. U. of Alberta Press, 1993. 202 pp.
- den Otter, Andy A. Civilizing the West: The Galts and the Development of Western Canada. U. of Alberta Press, 1981. 395 pp.
- Flint, David. The Hutterites: A Study in Prejudice. Oxford U. Press, 1975. 193 pp.
- Gray, James. Booze: The Impact of Whisky On the Prairie West (Toronto: Macmillan, 1972.)
- Hoe, Ban Seng. Structural Changes of Two Chinese Communities in Alberta, Canada. Mercury Series, no. 19. Ottawa: Natl. Mus. of Man, Can. Centre for Folk Culture Studies, 1976. 385 pp.
- McLachlan, Elizabeth. With Unshakeable Persistence: Rural Teachers of the Depression Era. Edmonton: NeWest, 1999. 187 pp.
- Palmer, Howard and Palmer, Tamara, eds. Peoples of Alberta: Portraits of Cultural Diversity. Saskatoon, Sask.: Western Producer Prairie Books, 1985. 551 pp.
- Palmer, Howard. Patterns of Prejudice: A History of Nativism in Alberta. McClelland and Stewart, 1982. 217 pp.
- Scheffel, David. In the Shadow of Antichrist: The Old Believers in Alberta. Peterborough, Ont.: Broadview, 1991. 252 pp.
- Stebbins, Robert A. The Franco-Calgarians: French Language, Leisure, and Linguistic Life-Style in an Anglophone City. U. of Toronto Press, 1994. 152 pp.
- Ukrainian Pioneers' Association of Alberta. Ukrainians in Alberta. Edmonton: Ukrainian Pioneers' Assoc. of Alberta (1975) 560 pp.
- Wall, Karen L. Game Plan: A Social History of Sport in Alberta (2013) online review
- Williams, Robert J., Yale D. Belanger, and Jennifer N. Arthur. "Gambling in Alberta: History, current status and socioeconomic impacts" (Alberta Gaming Research Institute, 2011) online.

== See also ==
- Bibliography of Canada
- Bibliography of Canadian history
- Bibliography of Nova Scotia
- Bibliography of Saskatchewan history
- Bibliography of British Columbia
- Bibliography of the 1837-1838 insurrections in Lower Canada
- List of books about the War of 1812
