= List of the public meetings held in Lower Canada between May and November 1837 =

This is a list of the public meetings held in Lower Canada between May and November 1837, both those held by the Parti patriote as well as those held by the Constitutional Party. On June 15, Governor Gosford issued a proclamation forbidding public county meetings. The proclamation was ignored. On June 29, Constitutionals started holding their own county meetings.

| Date | Event | Organization | Media |
|---|---|---|---|
| May 7 | meeting of Saint-Ours | Parti patriote | resolutions published May 11 in La Minerve |
| May 15 | meeting of Saint-Laurent | Parti patriote | resolutions published May 18 in La Minerve |
| May 15 | meeting of Saint-Marc | Parti patriote | resolutions published May 22 in La Minerve |
| May 15 | meeting of Québec | Parti patriote | resolutions published May 23 in The Vindicator |
| June 1 | meeting of Saint-Scholastique | Parti patriote | resolutions published June 5 in La Minerve |
| June 1 | meeting of Saint-Hyacinthe | Parti patriote | resolutions published June 8 in La Minerve |
| June 4 | meeting of Longueuil | Parti patriote | resolutions published June 12 in La Minerve |
| June 4 | meeting of Québec | Parti patriote | resolutions published June 8 in La Minerve |
| June 11 | meeting of Sainte-Rose | Parti patriote | resolutions published June 15 in La Minerve |
| June 18 | meeting of Berthier | Parti patriote | resolutions published June 22 in La Minerve |
| June 18 | meeting of Saint-François-du-Lac | Parti patriote | resolutions published June 26 in La Minerve |
| June 23 | meeting of Saint-Hyacinthe | Parti patriote | resolutions published June 29 in La Minerve |
| June 25 | meeting of La Malbaie | Parti patriote | resolutions published October 31 in Le Libéral |
| June 26 | meeting of Saint-Thomas | Parti patriote | resolutions published July 3 in Le Canadien |
| June 28 | meeting of Montréal | Parti patriote | resolutions published June 30 in La Minerve |
| June 29 | meeting of Rawdon | Constitutional Party | resolutions published July 14 in Le Populaire |
| July 4 | meeting of Stanbidge | Parti patriote | resolutions published July 13 in La Minerve |
| July 6 | meeting of Montréal | Constitutional Party | resolutions published July 8 in The Montreal Gazette |
| July 12 | meeting of Napierville | Parti patriote | resolutions published July 20 in La Minerve |
| July 16 | meeting of Deschambault | Parti patriote | resolutions published July 24 in La Minerve |
| July 24 | meeting of Napierville | Parti patriote | resolutions published August 1 in The Montreal Gazette |
| July 25 | meeting of Trois-Rivières | Constitutional Party | resolutions published July 28 in Le Populaire |
| July 26 | meeting of Yamachiche | Parti patriote | resolutions published July 31 in La Minerve |
| July 29 | meeting of l'Assomption | Parti patriote | resolutions published August 3 in La Minerve |
| July 31 | meeting of Québec | Constitutional Party | resolutions published August 2 in L'Ami du peuple |
| August 4 | meeting of Aylmer | Constitutional Party | resolutions published August 19 in L'Ami du peuple |
| August 6 | meeting of Yamaska | Constitutional Party | resolution unique published August 19 in L'Ami du peuple |
| August 6 | meeting of Saint-Constant | Parti patriote | resolutions published August 14 in La Minerve |
| August 6 | meeting of Saint-François-du-Lac on seignorial tenure | Parti patriote | resolutions published August 18 in Le Canadien |
| August 6 | meeting of Vaudreuil | Parti patriote | resolutions published August 14 in Le Canadien |
| September 10 | gathering of the youth of Saint-Denis | Parti patriote | resolutions published September 24 in La Minerve |
| September 10 | meeting of Napierville | Parti patriote | resolutions published September 21 in La Minerve |
| September 10 | meeting of Saint-Ignace | Parti patriote | resolutions published September 21 in La Minerve |
| September 16 | meeting of Milton | Constitutional Party | resolutions published November 29 in Le Populaire |
| September 16 | gathering of the women of Saint-Antoine | Parti patriote | an account of the country lunch published September 21 in La Minerve |
| October 1 | Meeting of the permanent committee of Deux-Montagnes | Parti patriote | resolutions of the 8th sitting published October 9 in La Minerve |
| October 13 | meeting of Clarenceville | Constitutional Party | an account of the resolutions published November 11 in The Montreal Gazette |
| October 15 | meeting of Saint-Polycarpe | Parti patriote | resolutions published October 19 in La Minerve |
| October 23 | Grand meeting of Montreal at Place d'Armes | Constitutional Party | report, resolutions and addresses published October 24 and 28 in The Montreal Gazette |
| October 23–24 | Grand Meeting of the Confederation of the Six Counties in Saint-Charles | Parti patriote | report, resolutions and addresses published October 30 and November 2 in La Minerve |
| November 5 | meeting of Saint-Athanase | Parti patriote | resolutions published November 9 in La Minerve |
| November 13 | meeting of Abbotsford | Constitutional Party | resolutions published November 21 in The Montreal Gazette |
| November 20 | meeting of Sherbrooke | Constitutional Party | resolutions published November 2 in The Montreal Gazette |
| November 23 | meeting of Granby | Constitutional Party | resolutions published December 4 in The Morning Courier |
