= Joseph Schull =

Canadian playwright and historian

Joseph Schull OC
- Born: 6 February 1906; Watertown, South Dakota
- Died: 19 May 1980 (aged 74); Montreal, Quebec

Joseph Schull OC (6 February 1906 – 19 May 1980) was a Canadian playwright and historian who wrote more than two dozen books and 200 plays for radio and television.

Born in Watertown, South Dakota, he moved to Moose Jaw, Saskatchewan in 1913. He studied at the University of Saskatchewan and Queen's University. In the 1930s, he worked in advertising. During World War II, he was an Intelligence and Information Officer with the Royal Canadian Navy. After the war, he focused on his writing. He also was a beloved husband and father of three in Rosemere, Quebec.

== Selected bibliography ==
- Far Distant Ships: An Official Account of Canadian Naval Operations in World War II (1950)
- The Salt-Water Men: Canada's Deep Sea Sailors (1957)
- 100 years of banking in Canada : a history of the Toronto-Dominion Bank (1958)
- Battle for the rock : the story of Wolfe and Montcalm (1960)
- Laurier (1965)
- Rebellion: The Rising of French Canada 1837 (1971)
- Edward Blake: The Man of the Other Way (1975)
- Edward Blake : leader and exile, 1881–1912 (1976)
- Ontario Since 1867 (1978)
- The great Scot : a biography of Donald Gordon (1979)
