= The People of New France =

- Author: Allan Greer
- Language: English
- Genre: History
- Publisher: University of Toronto Press
- Publication date: 1997
- Publication place: Canada

The People of New France (French: Brève histoire des peuples de la Nouvelle-France) is a book of Canadian history during the 17th and 18th centuries written by Allan Greer and published by the University of Toronto Press in 1997 and by Boréal in 1998 for the French version, as part of the Themes in Canadian History series. Unlike works of history that focus on the political histories of government officials and the clergy, Greer focuses on the day-to-day reality of living in French colonial Canada. One 2007 review of the book describes the treatment as focusing on "... colonial society 'as it was' by examining the 'frameworks of ordinary life' – death, birth, marriage, food, race, class."

== Academic use ==
The People of New France have been recognized by Canadian academics as a noteworthy addition to the writings on Canadian history through incorporation into college and high school level coursework.

The work is used in a history course at Northern Lights College and is a required textbook in a history course taught since 2005 in the distance-learning program of the University of British Columbia. The work was also included in the 2003 Historica Summer Institute, an annual program aimed at providing high school teachers from across Canada with "strategies and perspectives for teaching Canadian history".

The book appeared on the reading list for a course on New France at Queen's University in Kingston, HIST 350.

The book has also been assigned for HIST 334, History of New France, at McGill University, where Greer is currently teaching.
