= ProQuest Dissertations and Theses =

Online database of dissertations and theses

- Producer: ProQuest (United States)

Access
- Cost: Subscriptions

Coverage
- Record depth: Index, abstract & full text
- Format coverage: Dissertations and theses
- Temporal coverage: 1637 to present

Links
- Website: www.proquest.com/products-services/dissertations/

ProQuest Dissertations and Theses (PQDT) is an online database that indexes, abstracts, and provides full-text access to dissertations and theses. The database includes over 2.4 million records and covers 1637 to the present. It is produced by ProQuest and was formerly known as ProQuest Digital Dissertations. The bibliographic database (without full-text dissertations) is known as Dissertation Abstracts or Dissertation Abstracts International.

PQDT annually publishes more than 90% of all dissertations submitted from accredited institutions of higher learning in North America as well as from colleges and universities in Europe and Asia. Over the past 60 years, PQDT has amassed more than 1.4 million titles beginning with the first U.S. dissertation accepted by a university (Yale) in 1861. ProQuest began digitizing dissertations in 1997 from a microform archive.

In October 2015, ProQuest added the ability for authors to include an ORCID identifier when submitting a thesis.

Dissertation Abstracts
- Producer: ProQuest (United States)
- History: 1938 to present

Access
- Cost: Subscription

Coverage
- Record depth: Index & abstract
- Format coverage: Dissertations
- Temporal coverage: 1861–present
- Geospatial coverage: Worldwide

Print edition
- Print title: Dissertation Abstracts International: Section A: Humanities and Social Sciences; Section B: Sciences and Engineering; Section C: Worldwide

Links
- Website: www.proquest.com/products-services/dissertations/Dissertations-Abstract-International.html

== Abstracts ==
Dissertation Abstracts, Dissertation Abstracts International (DAI) is a bibliographic database of American dissertations published since 1938, initially by University Microfilms International (UMI) now by ProQuest, Ann Arbor.

DAI covers doctoral dissertations accepted at accredited American institutions since 1861. Selected master's theses have been included since 1962; since 1988, the database includes citations for dissertations from 50 British universities that are available at The British Document Supply Centre. Additionally, it covers a limited number of dissertations from the rest of the world.

The print version is published monthly and cumulated annually and it is available both in softcover and on microfiche. It is divided in three sections:

- Section A, Humanities and Social Sciences (ISSN 0419-4209)
- Section B, Sciences and Engineering (ISSN 0419-4217)
- Section C (formerly European Dissertations) (ISSN 1042-7279) covers non-North American materials, most of them unavailable for purchase from ProQuest. As of 2008, ProQuest no longer offers Section C as a separate product.

Former titles and print titles: From 1969: Dissertations Abstract International; from 1951: Dissertations Abstracts; from Microfilm Abstracts (an annual catalog of the dissertations available for sale from UMI), American Doctoral Dissertations (ADD), (until 1964): Index to American Doctoral Dissertations, (until 1956): Doctoral Dissertations Accepted by American Universities. Masters Abstracts International (MAI).

There are different versions in print and online. The online version is Dissertation Abstracts Online while the print bibliography is termed Dissertation Abstracts International. Material except the abstracts themselves were issued also on CD-ROM under the title: Dissertation abstracts ondisc.

- 1997: Dissertations go digital with ProQuest Digital Dissertations
- 1998: Library of Congress recognizes UMI as offsite repository of Digital Dissertations Library

== See also ==
- Gray literature
- Indexing and abstracting service
