= Fernand Ouellet =

French-Canadian author and educator (1926–2021)

Fernand Ouellet OC FRSC (6 November 1926 in Lac-Bouchette, Quebec – 28 June 2021 in Toronto, Ontario) was a French Canadian historian, author and educator.

== Biography ==
He was educated at Université Laval and gained a PhD in 1965. Ouellet taught at Université Laval, Carleton University, and the University of Ottawa in 1961–1985, prior to joining the History Department at York University in 1986.

Throughout his career, he used techniques imported from economics and psychology to challenge the foundations of Quebec nationalism. His contributions to the historiographical debates over the British Conquest and the 1837 Rebellion have been especially controversial. In particular, he drew attention to the role played by women in Quebec society. He accused fellow historians of trying to "normalize" Quebec's past, so as to provide a stronger justification of sovereignty. In response, other French-speaking historians have been hostile to his suggestion that French-Canadians are the agents of their own difficulties. These historians, instead of dwelling on economic shortcomings, have stressed the deep roots of modernity, a position that Ouellet strongly rejected. In a nutshell, Ouellet insisted that Quebec's history offers "more support for the thesis of backwardness than for that of modernization." A devout follower and admirer of Pierre Trudeau and his political ideology (Trudeauism), Ouellet was strongly against Quebec nationalism and the Quebec sovereignty movement. Trudeau and Ouellet intellectually influenced each other in their respective texts, though they never formed a personal and emotional friendship.

He died on 28 June 2021 in Toronto, aged 94. Married to Thérèse Roy, he had three children and four grandchildren.

== Awards ==
Ouellet received numerous prizes, awards, and honours, including the J. B. Tyrrell Historical Medal of the Royal Society of Canada in 1969, the Governor General's Award for non-fiction in 1977, the Sir John A. Macdonald Prize of the Canadian Historical Association in 1977, and others. He was a Fellow of the Royal Society of Canada, serving as honorary secretary from 1977 to 1980.

Ouellet served as president of the Canadian Historical Association in 1970, and was made an Officer of the Order of Canada in 1979. He was also the editor of Histoire Sociale (Social History) from 1971 to 1988. Ouellet is the author of several works on the history of nineteenth-century French Canada, including Histoire économique et sociale du Québec, 1760–1850, published 1966, Le Bas-Canada, 1791–1840, and Louis Joseph Papineau, un être divisé, published 1960.
