= Bibliography of Canada =

The National Flag of Canada

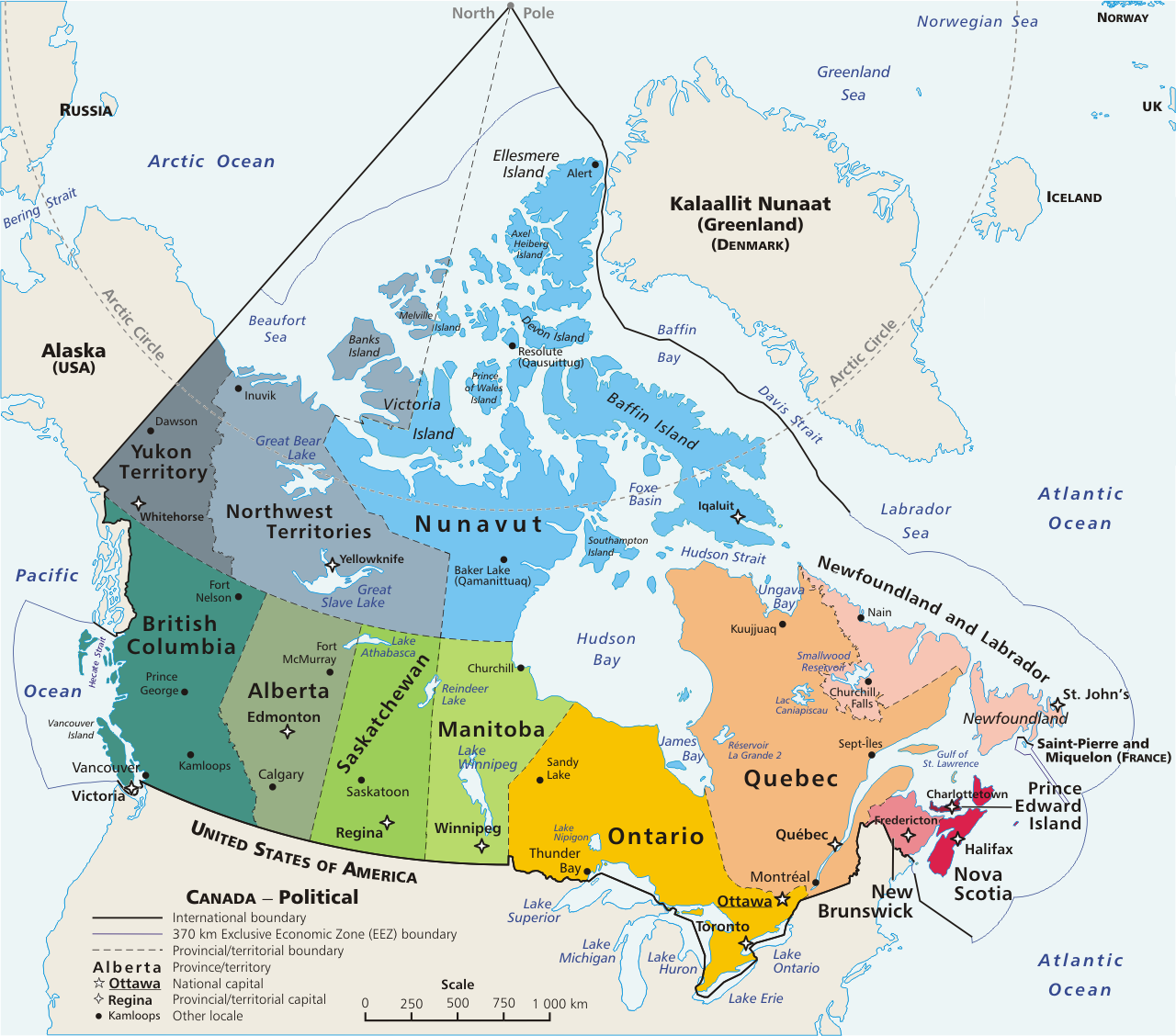
An enlargeable map of Canada, showing its ten provinces and three territories.

This is a bibliography of works on Canada mainly compiled in 2011 from the Canadiana : the national bibliography with arbitrary additions since then.

For an annotated bibliography and evaluation of major books, see Canada: A Reader's Guide, (2nd ed., 2000) by J.André Senécal, online.

== Overviews ==
- James H. Marsh (1999). The Canadian Encyclopedia. The Canadian Encyclopedia. ISBN 978-0-7710-2099-5.
- J. M. S. Careless (30 June 2011), Canada: A Story of Challenge, Cambridge University Press, ISBN 978-1-107-67581-0
- Colombo, John Robert (1 June 2001), 1000 questions about Canada: places, people, things, and ideas, Dundurn Press Ltd., ISBN 978-0-88882-232-1
- Canada: English Guide, Rough Guides, 2004, ISBN 978-1-84353-266-8
- Mark Kearney; Randy Ray (2009), The Big Book of Canadian Trivia, Dundurn, ISBN 978-1-77070-614-9
- Paul Robert Magocsi (1999), Encyclopedia of Canada's Peoples, University of Toronto Press, ISBN 978-0-8020-2938-6
- Christopher Moore (2002), The Big Book of Canada, TUNDRA BOOKS Incorporated, ISBN 978-0-88776-457-8
- Alan Rayburn (2001), Naming Canada: Stories About Canadian Place Names, University of Toronto Press, ISBN 978-0-8020-8293-0
- Karla Zimmerman (2010), Lonely Planet Canada, Lonely Planet, ISBN 978-1-74220-320-1
- Statistics Canada (1867–2012), Canada Year Book (Online), Ottawa: Federal Publications (Queen of Canada), Catalogue no 11-402-XPE
- CBC; Don Gillmor; Pierre Turgeon (1 October 2002), Canada: A People's History Vol-1, vol. 1, McClelland & Stewart, ISBN 978-0-7710-3324-7
- CBC; Don Gillmor; Pierre Turgeon; Achille Michaud (1 October 2002), Canada: A People's History Vol-2, McClelland & Stewart, ISBN 978-0-7710-3336-0

== Geography and environment ==
Bibliographies

- Thomas A. Rumney (1 March 2010), Canadian geography: a scholarly bibliography, Scarecrow Press, ISBN 978-0-8108-6717-8

=== Atlases ===
- Dean, William G.; Geoffrey J. Matthews; Byron Moldofsky (1998), Concise historical atlas of Canada, University of Toronto Press, ISBN 978-0-8020-4203-3
- Fick, Steven (2004), The Canadian atlas: our nation, environment and people, Douglas & McIntyre, ISBN 978-0-88850-770-9
- Hayes, Derek (2002), Historical Atlas of Canada: Canada's History Illustrated with Original Maps, Douglas & McIntyre, ISBN 978-1-55054-918-8
- Hudson, John C (2002), Across this land: a regional geography of the United States and Canada, Johns Hopkins University Press, ISBN 978-0-8018-6567-1
- Matthews, Geoffrey J.; R. Louis Gentilcore (1993), Historical Atlas of Canada: The land transformed, 1800-1891, University of Toronto Press, ISBN 978-0-8020-3448-9
- Matthews, Geoffrey J. (1987), Historical atlas of Canada, Volume 1, University of Toronto Press, ISBN 978-0-8020-2495-4
- Matthews, Geoffrey J. (1993) Historical Atlas of Canada: Addressing the twentieth century, 1891-1961. University of Toronto Press ISBN 978-0-8020-2495-4
- Schwartzenberger, Tina (2005), The Canadian Shield, Weigl Educational Publishers Limited ISBN 978-1-55388-141-4

=== Cities and suburbs ===
- Philip Booth; Bernard Jouve, eds. (2005), Metropolitan democracies: transformations of the state and urban policy in Canada, France and Great Britain, Ashgate Publishing, Ltd., ISBN 978-0-7546-4337-1
- William J. Coffey (December 1994), The evolution of Canada's metropolitan economies, Institute for Research on Public Policy, ISBN 978-0-88645-155-4
- Robert Fulford (14 September 1995), Accidental City: The Transformation of Toronto, Macfarlane Walter & Ross, ISBN 978-0-9219-1291-0
- Richard Harris (7 October 1999), Unplanned Suburbs: Toronto's American Tragedy, 1900 to 1950, JHU Press, ISBN 978-0-8018-6282-3
- Richard Harris (2004), Creeping conformity: how Canada became suburban, 1900-1960, University of Toronto Press, ISBN 978-0-8020-8428-6
- Lewis, Robert. (2001) Manufacturing Montreal: The Making of an Industrial Landscape, 1850 to 1930. Johns Hopkins University Press, ISBN 978-0-8018-6349-3
- James Lorimer; Evelyn Ross (1 January 1977), The Second city book: studies of urban and suburban Canada, James Lorimer & Company, ISBN 978-0-88862-140-5
- Morton, Suzanne. (1995) Ideal Surroundings: Domestic Life in a Working-Class Suburb in the 1920s (Studies in Gender and History) ISBN 978-0-8020-0474-1
- Carolyn Whitzman (15 May 2009), Suburb, slum, urban village: transformations in Toronto's Parkdale neighbourhood, 1875-2002, UBC Press, ISBN 978-0-7748-1535-2

=== Climate ===
- Bailey, William G; Oke, TR; Rouse, Wayne R (1997), The surface climates of Canada, McGill-Queen's University Press, ISBN 978-0-7735-1672-4
- Bernstein, Steven F. (2008), A globally integrated climate policy for Canada, University of Toronto Press, ISBN 978-0-8020-9878-8
- Harold Coward; Andrew J. Weaver, eds. (2004). Hard Choices: Climate Change in Canada. Centre for Studies in Religion and Society / Wilfrid Laurier Univ. Press. ISBN 978-0-88920-442-3.
- Etkin, David; Haque, CE; Brooks, Gregory R (2003), An Assessment of Natural Hazards and Disasters in Canada, Springer, ISBN 978-1-4020-1179-5
- French, Hugh M; Olav Slaymaker (1993), Canada's Cold Environments, McGill-Queen's University Press, ISBN 978-0-7735-0925-2
- Gazlay, Suzy (2009), David Suzuki: Doing Battle with Climate Change, Crabtree, ISBN 978-0-7787-4665-2
- Jaccard, Mark; Jeffrey Simpson; Nic Rivers (2008), Hot Air: Meeting Canada's Climate Change Challenge, Emblem/McClelland & Stewart, ISBN 978-0-7710-8097-5
- Smit, Barry; Shirley Ellen Wall; Johanna Wandel (2007), Farming in a changing climate: agricultural adaptation in Canada, UBC Press, ISBN 978-0-7748-1393-8
- Suzuki, David; David R. Boyd (2008), David Suzuki's Green Guide, Greystone Books, ISBN 978-1-55365-293-9

=== Environmentalism ===
- Adkin, Laurie E. (2009), Environmental conflict and democracy in Canada, UBC Press, ISBN 978-0-7748-1602-1
- Castonguay, Stéphane; Michèle Dagenais (2011), Metropolitan Natures: Environmental Histories of Montreal, University of Pittsburgh Pre, ISBN 978-0-8229-4402-7
- Desbiens, Caroline. Power from the North: Territory, Identity, and the Culture of Hydroelectricity in Quebec (2014)
- Desfor, Gene and Roger Keil, eds. Nature and the City: Making Environmental Policy in Toronto and Los Angeles (2004)
- Dunlap, Thomas R. (1999), Nature and the English diaspora: environment and history in the United States, Canada, Australia, and New Zealand, Cambridge University Press, ISBN 978-0-521-65700-6
- Forkey, Neil Stevens. Canadians and the natural environment to the twenty-first century (U Toronto Press, 2012) online
- French, Hugh; Olav Slaymaker (2011), Changing Cold Environments: A Canadian Perspective, John Wiley & Sons, ISBN 978-1-119-95108-7
- MacDowell, Laurel Sefton. An environmental history of Canada (UBC Press, 2012) online.
- MacPhee, Katrin. "Canadian Working-Class Environmentalism, 1965–1985." Labour 74 (2014). online
- Mascarenhas, Michael. Where the waters divide: Neoliberalism, white privilege, and environmental racism in Canada (Lexington Books, 2012) online.
- Pyne, Stephen J. Awful Splendour: A Fire History of Canada (2008), on human uses and control of fires
- Teelucksingh, Cheryl, et al. "Environmental justice in the environmental non‐governmental organization landscape of Toronto (Canada)." The Canadian Geographer/Le Géographe canadien 60.3 (2016): 381-393.
- Zhou, Min. "A multidimensional analysis of public environmental concern in Canada." Canadian Review of Sociology/Revue canadienne de sociologie 50.4 (2013): 453-481. https://doi.org/10.1111/cars.12028

=== Fauna and flora ===
- Bumstead, Pat; Norman H. Worsley (2003), Canadian skin and scales, Simply Wild Publications, ISBN 978-0-9689278-1-6
- Drushka, Ken (2003), Canada's forests: a history, McGill-Queen's University Press, ISBN 978-0-7735-2660-0
- Feldhamer, George A (2003), Wild mammals of North America (2nd ed.), Johns Hopkins University Press, ISBN 978-0-8018-7416-1
- Nils, John Macoun; Conrad Kindberg (1883), Catalogue of Canadian plants, Geological Survey of Canada
- Ross, Alexander Milton (1871), The Birds of Canada, Rowsell and Hutchison. ISBN 978-1-146-72072-4
- Stephen Bocking (2000). Biodiversity in Canada: Ecology, Ideas, and Action. Broadview Press. ISBN 978-1-55111-238-1.
- Max Foran (2018). The Subjugation of Canadian Wildlife: Failures of Principle and Policy. McGill-Queen's University Press. ISBN 978-0-7735-5428-3.
- Jamie Benidickson (2020). Environmental Law in Canada. Wolters Kluwer. ISBN 978-94-035-1895-4.
- Max Foran (2018). The Subjugation of Canadian Wildlife: Failures of Principle and Policy. McGill-Queen's University Press. ISBN 978-0-7735-5428-3.
- Andrea Olive (2015). The Canadian Environment in Political Context. University of Toronto Press. ISBN 978-1-4426-0871-9.
- C. Tyler DesRoches; Frank Jankunis; Byron Williston (2019). Canadian Environmental Philosophy. McGill-Queen's University Press. ISBN 978-0-7735-5777-2.

== History ==
- Armstrong, Frederick H (1985), Handbook of Upper Canadian Chronology, Dundurn Press, ISBN 978-0-919670-92-1
- Bourinot, John George, Sir; Wrong, George McKinnon (1909), Canada Under British Rule 1760-1905, University of California Libraries: Cambridge, University press
- Crowley, Terence Allan, (1994) The essentials of Canadian history : pre-colonization to 1867, the beginning of a nation, Research and Education Association ISBN 978-0-87891-916-1
- E. Riendeau, Roger (2007), A brief history of Canada (2nd ed.), Toronto: - Facts on File, cop, ISBN 978-0-8160-6335-2
- Johnston, Sir Harry (2009), Pioneers in Canada (Illustrated Edition), Dodo Press, ISBN 978-1-4065-3521-1
- Leacock, Stephen (2009), The Dawn of Canadian History: A Chronicle of Aboriginal Canada, Dodo Press ISBN 978-1-4099-4930-5
- Francis, R. D; Jones, Richard; Smith, Donald B (2009), Journeys: A History of Canada, Oxford, UK: Nelson Education, ISBN 978-0-17-644244-6
- Kingsford, William (1887), The History of Canada: Canada under French rule, Roswell and Hutchinson, ISBN 978-1-02-233033-7
- Kyte, Elinor (1985), Redcoats and Patriotes, The Rebellions in Lower Canada, Canadian War Museum publication, p. 6, ISBN 978-0-8020-6930-6
- MacDowell, Laurel Sefton; Ian Radforth (2006), Canadian working-class history: selected readings, Canadian Scholars’ Press, ISBN 978-1-55130-298-0
- Morton, Desmond (2001), A short history of Canada (5th ed.), Marks and Spencer, ISBN 978-0-7710-6508-8
- Roach, Kent (2003), September 11: consequences for Canada, McGill-Queen's University Press, ISBN 978-0-7735-2584-9
- Taylor, Martin Brook; Doug Owram (1994), Canadian History: Beginnings to Confederation vol. 1, University of Toronto Press, ISBN 978-0-8020-5016-8
- Taylor, Martin Brook; Doug Owram (1994), Canadian History: Confederation to the present vol. 2, University of Toronto Press, ISBN 978-0-8020-2801-3
- Turgeon, Pierre (2002), Canada: A People's History, Volume 1, Marks & Spencer ISBN 978-0-7710-3324-7

=== Military and conflicts ===
Overviews

- Jeremy Black (8 November 2011), Fighting for America: The Struggle for Mastery in North America, 1519-1871, Indiana University Press, ISBN 978-0-253-35660-4
- Spencer C. Tucker; James Arnold; Roberta Wiener (2011), The Encyclopedia of North American Indian Wars, 1607-1890, ABC-CLIO, ISBN 978-1-85109-697-8
- Morton, Desmond (1999), A military history of Canada (4th ed.), Toronto: McClelland and Stewart, ISBN 978-0-7710-6514-9
- J. L. Granatstein (1 January 2011), Canada's Army: Waging War and Keeping the Peace, University of Toronto Press, ISBN 978-1-4426-1178-8
- Zuehlke, Mark (2006), Canadian Military Atlas: Four Centuries of Conflict from New France to Kosovo, Douglas & McIntyre, ISBN 978-1-55365-209-0

Specific

- Anderson, Fred (2000), Crucible of War: The Seven Years' War and the Fate of Empire in British North America, 1754-1766, New York: Knopf, ISBN 978-0-375-40642-3
- Bercuson, David J. (1999). Blood on the Hills: The Canadian Army in the Korean War University of Toronto Press, ISBN 978-0-8020-0980-7
- Busch, Briton Cooper (2003), Canada and the Great War: Western Front Association papers, McGill-Queen's University Press ISBN 978-0-7735-2546-7
- Chartrand, René; Ronald Volstad (2001), Canadian Forces in World War II, Osprey Publishing, ISBN 978-1-84176-302-6
- Cave, Alfred A. (2004), The French and Indian war, Greenwood Press ISBN 978-0-313-32168-9
- Clearwater, John (1998), Canadian nuclear weapons: the untold story of Canada's Cold War arsenal, Dundurn Press ISBN 978-1-55002-299-5
- Freeman, Bill; Richard Nielsen (1998), Far from home: Canadians in the First World War, McGraw-Hill Ryerson, ISBN 978-0-07-086118-3
- Flanagan, Thomas (2000), Riel and the Rebellion: 1885 reconsidered, University of Toronto Press, ISBN 978-0-8020-4708-3
- Fryer, Mary Beacock (1996), Battlefields of Canada, Dundurn Press, ISBN 978-1-55002-007-6
- Granatstein, J. L. Canada's War: The Politics of the Mackenzie King Government. Oxford UP, (1975).
- Granatstein, J. L., and Desmond Morton. A Nation Forged in Fire: Canadians and the Second World War, 1939–1945 (1989).
- Greenblatt, Miriam; John Stewart Bowman (2003), War of 1812, Facts on File, ISBN 978-0-8160-4936-3
- Hayes, Geoffrey et al. eds. Canada and the Second World War: Essays in Honour of Terry Copp (2012) specialized essays by scholars excerpt
- Johnston, William Cameron (2003-01-01), A war of patrols: Canadian Army operations in Korea, Canadian War Museum (UBC Press), ISBN 978-0-7748-1008-1
- Keshen, Jeffrey A. Saints, Sinners, and Soldiers: Canada's Second World War (2004)
- Senior, H. (1996). The last invasion of Canada: The Fenian raids, 1866-1870. Dundurn Press. ISBN 978-1-55002-085-4
- Skaarup, Harold A (2005), Out of Darkness-Light: A History of Canadian Military Intelligence, iUniverse, ISBN 978-0-595-67184-7
- Wrong, George M. (1968). Canada and the American Revolution: The Disruption of the First British Empire, Rowman & Littlefield Publishers.

== Indigenous ==
Bibliographies

- Phillip M. White (October 2004), Bibliography of Native American bibliographies, Greenwood Publishing Group, ISBN 978-0-313-31941-9

Historical

- Alia, Valerie (2009), Names and Nunavut: Culture and Identity in Arctic Canada, Berghahn Books, ISBN 978-1-84545-165-3
- Asch, Michael (1998), Aboriginal and treaty rights in Canada : essays on law, equality, and respect for difference, University of British Columbia Press, ISBN 978-0-7748-0581-0
- Bailey, Garrick Alan (2008), Handbook of North American Indians: Indians in contemporary society, Government Printing Office, ISBN 978-0-16-080388-8
- Beavon, D; Voyageur, C; Newhouse, D (2005), Hidden in plain sight: contributions of Aboriginal peoples to Canadian, University of Toronto Press, ISBN 978-0-8020-8800-0
- Bell, Catherine; Robert K. Paterson (2009), Protection of First Nations Cultural Heritage: Laws, Policy, and Reform, UBC Press, ISBN 978-0-7748-1463-8
- Bell, Catherine; Val Napoleon (2008), First Nations Cultural Heritage and Law: Case Studies, Voices, and Perspectives, UBC Press, ISBN 978-0-7748-1461-4
- Cairns, Alan (2000), Citizens plus: aboriginal peoples and the Canadian state, University of British Columbia Press, ISBN 978-0-7748-0767-8
- Cardinal, Tantoo (2004), Our story: Aboriginal voices on Canada's past, Doubleday Canada, ISBN 978-0-385-66075-4
- Clark, Ella Elizabeth (5 October 2011), Indian Legends of Canada, Random House Digital, Inc., ISBN 978-1-55199-512-0
- Crowe, Keith J (1991), A history of the original peoples of northern Canada, McGill-Queen's University Press, ISBN 978-0-7735-0880-4
- Cavell, Edward (2009), Classic Images of Canada's First Nations: 1850-1920, Heritage House, ISBN 978-1-894974-64-6

== Affairs of state ==
=== Government ===
- Bourinot, John George; Sir, Thomas Barnard Flint (2008), Parliamentary Procedure and Practice in the Dominion of Canada (4th ed.), The Lawbook Exchange, ISBN 978-1-58477-881-3
- Coucill, Irma (2005), Canada's Prime Ministers, Governors General and Fathers of Confederation, Pembroke Publishers, ISBN 978-1-55138-185-5
- Dawson, R. MacGregor; Dawson, WF (1989), Norman Ward (ed.), Democratic Government in Canada, Toronto: Lawbook, ISBN 978-0-8020-6703-6
- Edwin, Joseph; Crawford Munro (1889), The Constitution of Canada (Full text), Cambridge University Press
- John Melady (2011), Maple Leaf in Space: Canada's Astronauts, Dundurn Press Ltd., ISBN 978-1-55488-752-1
- Johnson, David (2006), Thinking government: public sector management in Canada (2nd ed.), Broadview Press, ISBN 978-1-55111-779-9
- Hale, Geoffrey; Geoffrey E. Hale (2006), Uneasy partnership: the politics of business and government in Canada, Broadview Press, ISBN 978-1-55111-504-7
- Malcolmson, Patrick; Richard Myers (2009), The Canadian Regime: An Introduction to Parliamentary Government in Canada (4th ed.), University of Toronto Press, ISBN 978-1-4426-0047-8
- Morton, Frederick Lee (2002), Law, politics, and the judicial process in Canada, Frederick Lee, ISBN 978-1-55238-046-8
- Roy, Jeffrey (2006), E-government in Canada: transformation for the digital age, University of Ottawa Press, ISBN 978-0-7766-0617-0
- Roy, Jeffrey (2007), Business and government in Canada, University of Ottawa Press, ISBN 978-0-7766-0658-3
- Smith, David E. (2007), The people's House of Commons: theories of democracy in contention, University of Toronto Press, ISBN 978-0-8020-9465-0
- Stevenson, Garth (2004), Unfulfilled union: Canadian federalism and national unity (4th ed.), McGill-Queen's University Press, ISBN 978-0-7735-2744-7

=== Politics ===
- Rand Dyck (2011), Canadian Politics, Cengage Learning, ISBN 978-0-17-650343-7
- Christian Leuprecht (2011), Essential Readings in Canadian Constitutional Politics, University of Toronto Press, ISBN 978-1-4426-0368-4
- Bickerton, James (2009), Canadian Politics, University of Toronto Press, ISBN 978-1-4426-0121-5
- Courtney, John C; David E. Smith (2010), The Oxford handbook of Canadian politics, Oxford University Press, ISBN 978-0-19-533535-4
- Clément, Dominique (2009), Canada's Rights Revolution: Social Movements and Social Change, 1937-82, Univ of British Columbia Press, ISBN 978-0-7748-1480-5
- Hale, Geoffrey E (2002), The politics of taxation in Canada, Broadview Press, ISBN 978-1-55111-300-5
- Hill, Tony L (2002), Canadian politics, riding by riding, Prospect Park Press, ISBN 978-0-9723436-0-2
- Lightbody, James (2006), City politics, Canada, Broadview Press, ISBN 978-1-55111-753-9
- Macdonald, Douglas (2007), Business and environmental politics in Canada, Broadview Press, ISBN 978-1-55111-277-0
- Morton, Frederick Lee (2002), Law, politics, and the judicial process in Canada, Frederick Lee, ISBN 978-1-55238-046-8
- Newman, Stephen L (2004), Constitutional politics in Canada and the United States, State University of New York Press, ISBN 978-0-7914-5937-9
- Patten, Steve (2006), The Chrétien legacy: politics and public policy in Canada, McGill-Queen's University Press, ISBN 978-0-7735-3095-9
- Trimble, Linda; Jane Arscott (2008), Still Counting: Women in Politics Across Canada, Univ of Toronto Press, ISBN 978-1-55111-374-6
- Wiseman, Nelson (2007), In search of Canadian political culture, niv of British Columbia Prres, ISBN 978-0-7748-1388-4
  - Katherine Fierlbeck, Political Thought in Canada: An Intellectual History, Broadview Press, 2006
  - Ian McKay, Rebels, Reds, Radicals: Rethinking Canada's Left History, Between the Lines, 2006

=== Monarchy ===
- Bousfield, Arthur; Toffoli, Gary (2002), Fifty Years the Queen, Toronto: Dundurn Press, ISBN 978-1-55002-360-2
- Bousfield, Arthur; Toffoli, Gary (1991), Royal Observations: Canadians and Royalty, Hamilton: Dundurn Press, ISBN 978-1-55002-076-2
- Coates, Colin (2006), Majesty In Canada: Essays On The Role of Royalty, Hamilton: Dundurn Press, ISBN 978-1-55002-586-6
- Nock, David (2006), With good intentions : Euro-Canadian and Aboriginal relations in colonial Canada, University of British Columbia Press, ISBN 978-0-7748-1138-5
- Vaughan, Frederick (2004), Canadian Federalist Experiment: From Defiant Monarchy to Reluctant Republic, Montreal: McGill-Queen's University Press, ISBN 978-0-7735-2537-5

=== Law ===
- Baudouin, Jean-Louis (2010). Tort law in Canada. Kluwer Law International. ISBN 978-90-411-3373-1.
- Borrows, John (2002), Recovering Canada: the resurgence of Indigenous law, University of Toronto Press, ISBN 978-0-8020-3679-7
- Black-Branch, Jonathan L (1995), Making sense of the Canadian Charter of Rights and Freedoms, Canadian Education Association ISBN 978-0-920315-78-1
- Casey, Brian; Janet Mills (2005), Arbitration law of Canada: practice and procedure, Juris Pub, ISBN 978-1-929446-68-1
- Greene, Ian (1989),The Charter of Rights, Toronto, James Lorimer and Company, ISBN 978-1-55028-185-9
- Kronby, Malcolm C (2010), Canadian Family Law (10th ed.), J. Wiley, ISBN 978-0-470-73682-1
- Dahlitz, Julie (2003), Secession and international law: conflict avoidance – regional appraisals, The Hague: T.M.C. Asser Press, ISBN 978-90-6704-142-3
- Goldman, Calvin S; John D. Bodrug (2002), Competition Law of Canada, Volume 1, Juris Pub, ISBN 978-1-57823-096-9
- Morton, Frederick Lee (2002), Law, politics, and the judicial process in Canada, University of Calgary Press, ISBN 978-1-55238-046-8
- McRae, Donald M (2006), The Canadian yearbook of international law, University of British Columbia Press, ISBN 978-0-7748-5826-7
- Moon, Richard (2008), Law and religious pluralism in Canada, UBC Press, ISBN 978-0-7748-1497-3
- Songer, Donald R (2008), The transformation of the Supreme Court of Canada: an empirical examination, University of Toronto Press, ISBN 978-0-8020-9689-0

==== Crime ====
- Auger, Michel; Edwards, Peter (2004), The encyclopedia of Canadian organized crime: from Captain Kidd to Mom Boucher, Marks & Spencer ISBN 978-0-7710-3044-4
- André Cédilot; André Noël (2011), Mafia Inc.: The Long, Bloody Reign of Canada's Sicilian Clan, Random House Digital, Inc., ISBN 978-0-307-36042-7
- Beare, Margaret E (2007), Money laundering in Canada: chasing dirty and dangerous dollars, U. of Toronto Press, ISBN 978-0-8020-9143-7
- Carrigan, D. Owen. (1991) Crime and punishment in Canada: a history (Oxford University Press, 1991)
- Doyle, Aaron; Dawn Moore (2011), Critical Criminology in Canada: New Voices, New Directions, UBC Press, ISBN 978-0-7748-1835-3
- Doob, Anthony N (2004), Responding to youth crime in Canada, U. of Toronto Press, ISBN 978-0-8020-8856-7
- Grayson, Kyle (2008), Chasing dragons: security, identity, and illicit drugs in Canada, U. of Toronto Press, ISBN 978-0-8020-9479-7
- Grossman, Michelle G.; Julian V. Roberts (2011), Criminal Justice in Canada: A Reader, Cengage Learning, ISBN 978-0-17-650228-7
- Schneider, Stephen (2009), Iced: The Story of Organized Crime in Canada, Mississauga, Ont. : Wiley, ISBN 978-0-470-83500-5

=== Economy ===
- "OECD Economic Surveys: Canada 2010", Organización para la Cooperación y Desarrollo Económicos, Paris: OECD economic surveys, 2010, ISBN 978-92-64-08325-7
- "OECD Economic Surveys: Canada 2008", Organización para la Cooperación y Desarrollo Económicos, Paris: OECD economic surveys, 2008, ISBN 978-92-64-04393-0
- Baldwin, John Russel (2003), Innovation and knowledge creation in an open economy, Cambridge University Press, ISBN 978-0-521-81086-9
- Easterbrook, William Thoma; Aitken, Hugh G. J (1988), Canadian economic history, University of Toronto Press, ISBN 978-0-8020-6696-1
- Hessing, Melody; Michael Howlett; Tracy Summerville (2005), Canadian natural resource and environmental policy, UBC Press, ISBN 978-0-7748-1181-1
- Kealey, Gregory S (1995), Workers and Canadian history, McGill-Queen's University Press, ISBN 978-0-7735-1352-5
- Nikiforuk, Andrew; David Suzuki Foundation (2010), Tar Sands: Dirty Oil and the Future of a Continent (Revised and Updated ed.), Greystone Books, ISBN 978-1-55365-555-8
- Levi, Michael A (2009), The Canadian oil sands: energy security vs. climate change, Council on Foreign Relations, Center for Geoeconomic Studies, ISBN 978-0-87609-429-7
- Lipsey, Richard G; Alice Nakamura (2006), Services industries and the knowledge-based economy, University of Calgary Press, ISBN 978-1-55238-149-6
- Pomfret, Richard (2006) [1981], The Economic Development of Canada, Routledge, ISBN 978-0-415-37976-2
- Quarter, Jack; Laurie Mook; Ann Armstrong (2009), Understanding the Social Economy: A Canadian Perspective, University of Toronto Press, ISBN 978-0-8020-9695-1
- Tavidze, Albert (2007), Progress in Economics Research, Volume 12, Gardners Books, ISBN 978-1-60021-720-3

==== Science and technology ====
- Council of Canadian Academies (2012), The State of Science and Technology in Canada, 2012, Council of Canadian Academies, ISBN 978-1-926558-47-9
- Brian Buckley (2000), Canada's early nuclear policy: fate, chance and character, McGill-Queen's Press - MQUP, ISBN 978-0-7735-2077-6
- Leonard Brody; Ken Grant; Matt Holland (2002), Innovation nation: Canadian leadership from Java to Jurassic Park, John Wiley and Sons, ISBN 978-0-470-83202-8
- G. Bruce Doern; Robert W. Morrison; Arslan Dorman (2001), Canadian nuclear energy policy: changing ideas, institutions, and interests, University of Toronto Press, ISBN 978-0-8020-4788-5
- Larisa V. Shavinina (1 October 2004), Silicon Valley North: a high-tech cluster of innovation and entrepreneurship, Emerald Group Publishing, ISBN 978-0-08-044457-4

=== Social welfare ===
- Beach, Charles M., ed. (2006), Study of Economic Policy Health Services Restructuring in Canada Conference, Economic Policy, Queen's University, ISBN 978-1-55339-075-6
- Fierlbeck, Katherine (2011), Health Care in Canada: A Citizen's Guide to Policy and Politics, University of Toronto Press, ISBN 978-1-4426-0983-9
- Herrick, John Middlemist; Stuart, Paul H (2005), Encyclopedia of social welfare history in North America, Sage Publications, ISBN 978-0-7619-2584-2
- Jacobs, Philip; Jonsson, Egon; Rapoport, John (2008), Cost Containment and Efficiency in National Health Systems: A Global Comparison, WILEY-VCH, ISBN 978-3-527-32110-0
- Marchildon, Gregory P (2006), Health systems in transition : Canada, U. of Toronto Press, ISBN 978-0-8020-9400-1
- Milbourne, Paul (2010), Welfare Reform in Rural Places: Comparative Perspectives, Emerald, ISBN 978-1-84950-918-3
- Moscovitch, Allan; Jennissen, Theresa; Findlay, Peter (1983), The welfare state in Canada: 1840 to 1978, Wilfrid Laurier University Press, ISBN 978-0-88920-114-9
- Mullner, Ross M (2009), Encyclopedia of health services research, SAGE, cop, pp. 559–562, ISBN 978-1-4129-7194-2
- Turner, Francis Joseph (2005), Encyclopedia of Canadian social work, Wilfrid Laurier University Press, ISBN 978-0-88920-436-2
- Raphael, Dennis (2007), Poverty and Policy in Canada: Implications for Health and Quality of Life, Canadian Scholars' Press, ISBN 978-1-55130-323-9
- Westhues, Anne (2006), Canadian social policy: issues and perspectives, Wilfrid Laurier University Press, ISBN 978-0-88920-504-8

=== Foreign relations ===
- Cooper, Andrew F. Canadian Foreign Policy: Old Habits and New Directions (Scarborough, ON: Prentice Hall Canada, 1997).
- Murray, Robert W. and Paul Gecelovsky, eds. The Palgrave Handbook of Canada in International Affairs (Palgrave Macmillan, Cham, 2021) online
- Bernstein, Alan (June 2013). "Science Diplomacy as a Defining Role for Canada in the Twenty-First Century". Science & Diplomacy. 2 (2).
- Bothwell, Robert. Canada and the United States (1992) online
- Bothwell, Robert. The big chill: Canada and the Cold War (1998) online
- Bothwell, Robert. Alliance and illusion : Canada and the world, 1945-1984 (2007) online
- Bothwell, Robert and Jean Daudelin eds. Canada Among Nations: 100 Years of Canadian Foreign Policy (2009)
- Boucher, Jean-Christophe. "Yearning for a progressive research program in Canadian foreign policy." International Journal 69.2 (2014): 213–228. online commentary H-DIPLO
- Bouka, Yolande, et al. "Is Canada's Foreign Policy Really Feminist? Analysis and Recommendations." Policy 13 (2021). online
- Bow, Brian, and Andrea Lane, eds. Canadian Foreign Policy: Reflections on a Field in Transition (2020) excerpt
- Bow, Brian J.; Patrick Lennox (2008). An independent foreign policy for Canada?: challenges and choices for the future. University of Toronto Press. ISBN 978-0-8020-9634-0.
- Bugailiskis, Alex, and Andrés Rozental, eds. Canada Among Nations, 2011-2012: Canada and Mexico's Unfinished Agenda (2012) further details
- Carnaghan, Matthew, Allison Goody, "Canadian Arctic Sovereignty" (Library of Parliament: Political and Social Affairs Division, 26 January 2006)
- Chapnick, Adam, and Christopher J. Kukucha, eds. The Harper Era in Canadian Foreign Policy: Parliament, Politics, and Canada’s Global Posture (UBC Press, 2016).
- Collins, Jeffrey F. "Defence Procurement and Canadian Foreign Policy." in The Palgrave Handbook of Canada in International Affairs (Palgrave Macmillan, Cham, 2021) pp. 275–295.
- Congressional Research Service. Canada-U.S. Relations (Congressional Research Service, 2021) 2021 Report, by an agency of the U.S. government; not copyright; Updated 10 February 2021.
- Currie, Philip J., Canada and Ireland: A Political and Diplomatic History [Vancouver: UBC Press, 2020]
- Eayrs, James. In Defence of Canada. (5 vols. University of Toronto Press, 1964–1983) the standard history
- Fox, Annette Baker. Canada in World Affairs (Michigan State University Press, 1996)
- Froese, Marc D (2010), Canada at the WTO: Trade Litigation and the Future of Public Policy, University of Toronto Press, ISBN 978-1-4426-0138-3
- Glazov, Jamie. Canadian Policy Toward Khrushchev's Soviet Union (2003).
- Granatstein, J. L., ed. Canadian foreign policy : historical readings (1986), excerpts from primary sources and scholars online free
- Holloway, Steven Kendall (2006). Canadian foreign policy: defining the national interest. Toronto: University of Toronto Press. ISBN 1-55111-816-5.
- Hampson, Fen Osler, and James A. Baker. Master of Persuasion: Brian Mulroney's Global Legacy (2018)
- Hawes, Michael K., and Christopher John Kirkey, eds. Canadian Foreign Policy in a Unipolar World (Oxford UP, 2017).
- Hillmer, Norman and Philippe Lagassé. Justin Trudeau and Canadian Foreign Policy: Canada Among Nations 2017 (2018)
- Holmes John W. The Shaping of Peace: Canada and the Search for World Order. (2 vols. University of Toronto Press, 1979, 1982)
- Irwin, Rosalind (2001). Ethics and security in Canadian foreign policy. UBC Press. ISBN 978-0-7748-0863-7.
- James, Patrick, Nelson Michaud, and Marc O'Reilly, eds. Handbook of Canadian foreign policy (Lexington Books, 2006), essays by experts; 610pp excerpt
- James, Patrick. Canada and Conflict (Oxford University Press, 2012) H-DIPLO online reviews June 2014
- Kirk, John M. and Peter McKenna; Canada-Cuba Relations: The Other Good Neighbor Policy UP of Florida (1997).
- Kirton, John and Don Munton, eds. Cases and Readings in Canadian Foreign Policy Since World War II (1992) 24 episodes discussed by experts
- Kukucha, Christopher J. "Neither adapting nor innovating: the limited transformation of Canadian foreign trade policy since 1984." Canadian Foreign Policy Journal (2018): 1–15.
- McCormick, James M. "Pivoting toward Asia: Comparing the Canadian and American Policy Shifts." American Review of Canadian Studies 46.4 (2016): 474–495.
- McCullough, Colin, and Robert Teigrob, eds. Canada and the United Nations: Legacies, Limits, Prospects (2017).
- Melnyk, George. Canada and the New American Empire: War and Anti-War University of Calgary Press, 2004, highly critical
- Michaud, Nelson. "Balancing Interests and Constraints: The Role of Provinces in the Shaping of Canadian Foreign Policy." in Political Turmoil in a Tumultuous World (Palgrave Macmillan, Cham, 2021) pp. 77–104.
- Miller, Ronnie. Following the Americans to the Persian Gulf: Canada, Australia, and the Development of the New World Order (Fairleigh Dickinson University Press, 1994)
- Molot, Maureen Appel. "Where Do We, Should We, Or Can We Sit? A Review of the Canadian Foreign Policy Literature", International Journal of Canadian Studies (Spring-Fall 1990) 1#2 pp 77–96.
- Nossal, Kim Richard et al. International Policy and Politics in Canada (2010), university textbook; online 1989 edition
- Paris, Roland. "Are Canadians still liberal internationalists? Foreign policy and public opinion in the Harper era." International Journal 69.3 (2014): 274–307. online
- Rochlin, James. Discovering the Americas: The Evolution of Canadian Foreign Policy towards Latin America (University of British Columbia Press, 1994)
- Sarty, Keigh. "The Fragile Authoritarians: China, Russia and Canadian Foreign Policy." International Journal 75:4 (December 2020): 614–628. DOI: The fragile authoritarians: China, Russia, and Canadian foreign policy. online review
- Stacey, C. P. Canada and the Age of Conflict: Volume 1: 1867–1921 (1979), a standard scholarly history
- Stacey, C. P. Canada and the Age of Conflict, 1921–1948. Vol. 2. (University of Toronto Press, 1981), a standard scholarly history; online
- Stairs Denis, and Gilbert R. Winham, eds. The Politics of Canada's Economic Relationship with the United States (University of Toronto Press, 1985)
- Stevenson, Brian J. R. Canada, Latin America, and the New Internationalism: A Foreign Policy Analysis, 1968–1990 (2000)
- Thompson, John Herd; Randall, Stephen J (2008). Canada and the United States: Ambivalent Allies. University of Georgia Press. ISBN 978-0-8203-2403-6.
- Tiessen, Rebecca, and Heather A. Smith. "Canada’s ‘Feminist’ Foreign Policy Under the Harper Conservatives (2006–2015) and Trudeau Liberals (2015–2019) in Global Perspective." in The Palgrave Handbook of Canada in International Affairs (Palgrave Macmillan, Cham, 2021) pp. 117-139.
- Wildeman, Jeremy. "Assessing Canada’s foreign policy approach to the Palestinians and Israeli-Palestinian peacebuilding, 1979–2019." Canadian Foreign Policy Journal 27.1 (2021): 62–80. online
- Wildeman, Jeremy. "The Middle East in Canadian foreign policy and national identity formation." International Journal 76.3 (2021): 359–383. online
- Wilson, Robert R. and David R. Deener; Canada-United States Treaty Relations (Duke University Press, 1963)
- Arthur E. Blanchette (1994). Canadian foreign policy, 1977-1992: selected speeches and documents. McGill-Queen's Press – MQUP. ISBN 978-0-88629-243-0.
- Arthur E. Blanchette (2000). Canadian foreign policy, 1945-2000: major documents and speeches. Dundurn Press Ltd. ISBN 978-0-919614-89-5.
- Riddell, Walter A. ed. Documents on Canadian Foreign Policy, 1917–1939 Oxford University Press, 1962 806 pages of documents
- Arthur E. Blanchette (1994), Canadian foreign policy, 1977-1992: selected speeches and documents, McGill-Queen's Press - MQUP, ISBN 978-0-88629-243-0
- Arthur E. Blanchette (1 September 2000), Canadian foreign policy, 1945-2000: major documents and speeches, Dundurn Press Ltd., ISBN 978-0-919614-89-5
- Brian J. Bow; Patrick Lennox (2008), An independent foreign policy for Canada?: challenges and choices for the future, University of Toronto Press, ISBN 978-0-8020-9634-0
- Froese, Marc D (2010), Canada at the WTO: Trade Litigation and the Future of Public Policy, University of Toronto Press, ISBN 978-1-4426-0138-3
- Holloway, Steven Kendall (2006), Canadian foreign policy: defining the national interest, Toronto: University of Toronto Press, ISBN 978-1-55111-816-1
- Thompson, John Herd; Randall, Stephen J (2008), Canada and the United States: Ambivalent Allies, University of Georgia Press, ISBN 978-0-8203-2403-6
- Konrad, Victor; Nicol, Heather N (2008), Beyond walls: re-inventing the Canada-United States borderlands, Ashgate Publishing, ISBN 978-0-7546-7202-9
- Patrick James; Nelson Michaud; Marc J. O'Reilly (April 2006), Handbook of Canadian foreign policy, Lexington Books, ISBN 978-0-7391-1493-3
- Rosalind Irwin (2001), Ethics and security in Canadian foreign policy, UBC Press, ISBN 978-0-7748-0863-7

== Demographic and social history ==
- Allan, Greer (1997), The People of New France. (Themes in Canadian History Series), University of Toronto Press, ISBN 978-0-8020-7816-2
- Brault, Gerard J. (March 15, 1986), The French-Canadian Heritage in New England, University Press of New England, pp. 312 pages, ISBN 978-0-87451-359-2
- Bumsted, J. M (2003), Canada's diverse peoples: a reference sourcebook, Library of Congress ( ABC-CLIO), ISBN 978-1-57607-672-9
- Cohen, Andrew (2008), The Unfinished Canadian: The People We Are, Emblem ed, ISBN 978-0-7710-2286-9
- Magocsi, Paul R (1999), Encyclopedia of Canada's peoples, Society of Ontario, University of Toronto Press, ISBN 978-0-8020-2938-6
- Kerr, Don (2007), The Changing Face of Canada: Essential Readings in Population, Canadian Scholars' Press, ISBN 978-1-55130-322-2
- Jobb, Dean (2005), The Acadians: A people's story of exile and triumph, Mississauga: John Wiley & Sons Canada, ISBN 978-0-470-83610-1
- Pannekoek, Frits; Taras, David; Bakardjieva, Maria (2003), How Canadians communicate, Volume 1, University of Calgary Press, ISBN 978-1-55238-104-5
- Resnick, Philip (2005), The European Roots Of Canadian Identity, Peterborough, Ont.: Broadview Press, ISBN 978-1-55111-705-8
- Richard, Madeline (1992), Ethnic history and marital assimilation in Canada, 1871 and 1971, University of British Columbia Press, ISBN 978-0-7748-0431-8
- Roy, Patricia (2007), The triumph of citizenship: the Japanese and Chinese in Canada, 1941-67, UBC Press, ISBN 978-0-7748-1380-8
- Thornton, Russell (2000), Michael R. Haines, Richard Hall Steckel (ed.), A population history of North America, Cambridge: Cambridge University Press, ISBN 978-0-521-49666-7
- Wilson, Donna M; Northcott, Herbert C (2008), Dying and Death in Canada, Toronto: University of Toronto Press, ISBN 978-1-55111-873-4
- Roderic Beaujot and Don Kerr, (2007) The Changing Face of Canada: Essential Readings in Population, Canadian Scholars' Press ISBN 978-1-55130-322-2.

=== Languages ===
- Boberg, Charles (2010), The English Language in Canada: Status, History and Comparative Analysis, Cambridge University Press, ISBN 978-0-511-78981-6
- Kosel, Jochen (2009), The Language Situation in Canada with Special Regard to Quebec, RWTH Aachen University, ISBN 978-3-640-65926-5
- Edwards, John R (1998), Language in Canada, Cambridge University Press, ISBN 978-0-521-56328-4

=== Religion ===
- * Lori G. Beaman (2006), Religion And Canadian Society: Traditions, Transitions, And Innovations, Canadian Scholars' Press, ISBN 978-1-55130-306-2
- Lori Gail Beaman; Peter Beyer (2008), Religion and Diversity in Canada, BRILL, ISBN 978-90-04-17015-5
- Paul Bramadat; David Seljak (2009), Religion and Ethnicity in Canada, University of Toronto Press, ISBN 978-1-4426-1018-7
- Paul A. Bramadat; David Seljak (2008), Christianity and Ethnicity in Canada, University of Toronto Press, ISBN 978-0-8020-9584-8
- Robert Choquette (2004), Canada's Religions: An Historical Introduction, University of Ottawa Press, ISBN 978-0-7766-0557-9
- Terence J. Fay (2002), History of Canadian Catholics, McGill-Queen's Press - MQUP, ISBN 978-0-7735-6988-1
- Paul Robert Magocsi (1999), Encyclopedia of Canada's Peoples, University of Toronto Press, ISBN 978-0-8020-2938-6
- William Bettridge (1838), A Brief History of the Church in Upper Canada: Containing the Acts of Parliament, Imperial and Provincial, Royal Instructions, Proceedings of the Deputation, Correspondence with the Government, Clergy Reserves' Question, &c. &c, W.E. Painter
- Nancy Christie; Michael Gauvreau (2010), Christian Churches and Their Peoples, 1840-1965: A Social History of Religion in Canada, University of Toronto Press, ISBN 978-1-4426-6001-4
- Gary Miedema (2005), For Canada's Sake: Public Religion, Centennial Celebrations, and the Re-making of Canada in the 1960s, McGill-Queen's Press, ISBN 978-0-7735-2877-2
- Richard Moon (2008), Law and Religious Pluralism in Canada, UBC Press, ISBN 978-0-7748-5853-3
- Terrence Murphy; Roberto Perin (1996), A concise history of Christianity in Canada, Oxford University Press, ISBN 978-0-19-540758-7
- John G. Stackhouse Jr. (1998), Canadian Evangelicalism in the Twentieth Century: An Introduction to Its Character, Regent College Publishing, ISBN 978-1-57383-131-4
- Elam Rush Stimson (2008), History of the Separation of Church and State in Canada, BiblioBazaar, ISBN 978-0-559-67266-8
- Frances Swyripa (2010), Storied Landscapes: Ethno-Religious Identity and the Canadian Prairies, Univ. of Manitoba Press, ISBN 978-0-88755-720-0
- Marguerite Van Die (2001), Religion and Public Life in Canada: Historical and Comparative Perspectives, University of Toronto Press, ISBN 978-0-8020-8245-9
- Douglas James Wilson (1966), The Church Grows in Canada, University of Wisconsin: Ryerson Press

=== Immigration ===
- Adu-Febiri, Francis (2009), Succeeding from the margins of Canadian society: a strategic resource for new immigrants, refugees and international students, CCB Pub
- DeRocco, John F. Chabot. (2008) From Sea to Sea to Sea: A Newcomer's Guide to Canada Full Blast Productions, ISBN 978-0-9784738-4-6
- Driedger, Leo; Shivalingappa S. Halli (1999), Immigrant Canada: demographic, economic, and social challenges, University of Toronto Press, ISBN 978-0-8020-4276-7
- Kelley, Ninette; Michael J. Trebilcock (2010), The Making of the Mosaic: A History of Canadian Immigration Policy (2nd ed.), University of Toronto Press, ISBN 978-0-8020-9536-7
- Kranc, Benjamin A; Elena Constantin (2004), Getting into Canada : how to make a successful application for permanent residence, How To Books, ISBN 978-1-85703-929-0
- Moens, Alexander; Martin Collacott (2008), Immigration policy and the terrorist threat in Canada and the United States, Fraser Institute, ISBN 978-0-88975-235-1
- Noorani, Nick; Sabrina Noorani (2008), Arrival Survival Canada: A Handbook for New Immigrants, Oxford University Press, ISBN 978-0-19-542891-9
- Powell, John (2005), Encyclopedia of North American immigration, Facts On File, ISBN 978-0-8160-4658-4
- Walker, Barrington (2008), The History of Immigration and Racism in Canada: Essential Readings, Canadian Scholars' Press, ISBN 978-1-55130-340-6

=== Women ===
- Cook, Sharon Anne; McLean, Lorna; and O'Rourke, Kate, eds. Framing Our Past: Canadian Women's History in the Twentieth Century (2001). 498 pp. essays by scholars
- Dumont, Micheline, et al. (The Clio Collective). Quebec Women: A History (1987)
- Forster, Merna (2004). 100 Canadian Heroines: Famous and Forgotten Faces. Toronto: The Dundurn Group. ISBN 978-1-55002-514-9.
- Forestell, Nancy M., Kathryn M. McPherson, and Cecilia Louise Morgan, eds. Gendered Pasts: Historical Essays in Femininity and Masculinity in Canada (2003) 370 pp. excerpt and text search
- Gleason, Mona, and Adele Perry, eds. Rethinking Canada: The Promise of Women's History. (5th ed. 2006) 407 pp.; 24 essays by scholars online review
- Mitchinson, Wendy. Canadian Women: A Reader (1996), essays by scholars
- Parr, Joy, ed. Gender and History In Canada (1996)
- Parr, Joy. "Gender History and Historical Practice," The Canadian Historical Review (1995) 76:354-376
- Prentice, Alison and Susan Mann Trofimenkoff, eds. The Neglected Majority: Essays in Canadian Women's History (2 vol 1985), essays by scholars
- Prentice, Alison, et al. Canadian Women: a history (1996, 2nd edition)
- Sangster, Joan, ed. Through Feminist Eyes: Essays on Canadian Women's History (Athabasca University Press, 2011) online review.
- Smith, Michelle J., Clare Bradford, et al. From Colonial to Modern: Transnational Girlhood in Canadian, Australian, and New Zealand Literature, 1840-1940 (2018) excerpt

== Culture ==
- Beaty, Bart; Derek Briton (2010), How Canadians Communicate III: Contexts of Canadian Popular Culture, Athabasca University Press, ISBN 978-1-897425-59-6

- Taras, David; Maria Bakardjieva; Frits Pannekoek (2007), How Canadians communicate II: media, globalization, and identity, University of Calgary Press, ISBN 978-1-55238-224-0
- Pannekoek, Frits; Taras, David; Bakardjieva, Maria (2003), How Canadians communicate, Volume 1, University of Calgary Press, ISBN 978-1-55238-104-5

- Cameron, Elspeth (1997), Canadian culture: an introductory reader, Canadian Scholars' Press, ISBN 978-1-55130-090-0
- Carment, David; David Jay Bercuson (2008), The world in Canada: diaspora, demography, and domestic politics, McGill-Queen's Univ. Press, ISBN 978-0-7735-3296-0
- Clément, Dominique (2009), Canada's Rights Revolution: Social Movements and Social Change, 1937-82, Univ of British Columbia Prres, ISBN 978-0-7748-1480-5
- Edwardson, Ryan (2008), Canadian content: culture and the quest for nationhood, University of Toronto Press, ISBN 978-0-8020-9759-0
- Flaherty, David H; Frank E. Manning (1993), The Beaver bites back?: American popular culture in Canada, McGill-Queen's University Press, ISBN 978-0-7735-1119-4
- Greenhill, Pauline; Diane Tye (1997), Undisciplined women: tradition and culture in Canada, McGill-Queen's University Press, ISBN 978-0-7735-1615-1
- Howells, Coral Ann (2004), Where are the voices coming from?: Canadian culture and the legacies of history, Rodopi, ISBN 978-90-420-1623-1
- Kearney, Mark; Randy Ray (2009), The Big Book of Canadian Trivia, Dundurn Press, ISBN 978-1-55488-417-9
- Kearney, Mark; Randy Ray (1999), The great Canadian book of lists, Hounslow Press, ISBN 978-0-88882-213-0
- Kelley, Ninette; Michael J. Trebilcock (2010), The Making of the Mosaic: A History of Canadian Immigration Policy (2nd ed.), University of Toronto Press, ISBN 978-0-8020-9536-7
- Kranc, Benjamin A; Karina Roman (2003), Living & Working in Canada, How To Books, ISBN 978-1-85703-844-6
- Magocsi, Paul R (1999), Encyclopedia of Canada's peoples, Society of Ontario, University of Toronto Press, ISBN 978-0-8020-2938-6
- Mookerjea, Sourayan; Szeman, Imre; Faurschou, Gail (2009), Canadian cultural studies: a reader, Duke University Press, ISBN 978-0-8223-4398-1
- Podnieks, Andrew (2006), A Canadian Saturday Night: Hockey and the Culture of a Country, Greystone Books, ISBN 978-1-55365-201-4
- Ricketts, Shannon; Leslie Maitland; Jacqueline Hucker (2004), A guide to Canadian architectural styles, Broadview Press, ISBN 978-1-55111-546-7
- David Morton Rayside; Clyde Wilcox (2011), Faith, Politics, and Sexual Diversity in Canada and the United States, UBC Press, ISBN 978-0-7748-2009-7
- Roberts, Lance W (2005), Recent social trends in Canada, 1960-2000, McGill-Queen's University Press, ISBN 978-0-7735-2955-7
- Vance, Jonathan F. A History of Canadian Culture (Oxford UP, 2009). Wide range survey of. the arts, literature, artists, patronage and publications.
- Wiseman, Nelson (2007), In search of Canadian political culture, niv of British Columbia Prres, ISBN 978-0-7748-1388-4

=== Art ===
- Auger, Emily Elisabeth (2005), The way of Inuit art: aesthetics and history in and beyond the Arctic, McFarland, ISBN 978-0-7864-1888-6
- Bryce, Alan D (2007), Art smart : the intelligent guide to investing in the Canadian art market, Dundurn Group, ISBN 978-1-55002-676-4
- Crandall, Richard C (2000), Inuit art: a history, McFarland, ISBN 978-0-7864-0711-8
- Gérin, Annie; James S. McLean (2009), Public art in Canada: critical perspectives, University of Toronto Press, ISBN 978-0-8020-9847-4
- Harper, Russell. (1981) Painting in Canada: A History 2nd ed. Toronto: University of Toronto Press. ISBN 978-0-8020-6307-6
- Jonaitis, Aldona (2006), Art of the Northwest coast, University of Washington Press, ISBN 978-1-55365-210-6
- Murray, Joan; Lawren Harris (1993), The Best of the Group of Seven, McClelland & Stewart, ISBN 978-0-7710-6674-0
- Nasgaard, Roald. (2007) Abstract Painting in Canada, Vancouver: Douglas and McIntyre. ISBN 978-1-55365-226-7
- Norwell, Iris. (2011), Painters Eleven:The Wild Ones of Canadian Art, Publishers Group West, ISBN 978-1-55365-590-9
- Pearse, Harold (2006), From drawing to visual culture: a history of art education in Canada, McGill-Queen's University Press, ISBN 978-0-7735-3070-6
- Robertson, Clive (2006), Policy Matters: Administrations of Art and Culture, YYZ Books, ISBN 978-0-920397-36-7
- Tippett, Maria. (1993) By a Lady: Celebrating Three Centuries of Art by Canadian Women. Toronto: Penguin Books. ISBN 978-0-14-016955-3
- Walters, Evelyn (2005), The women of Beaver Hall: Canadian modernist painters, Dundurn Press, ISBN 978-1-55002-588-0

=== Film ===
- Foster, Charles (2000). Stardust and Shadows: Canadians in Early Hollywood, Dundurn Press, ISBN 978-1-55002-348-0
- Druick, Zoë. Aspa Kotsopoulos (2008) Programming reality: perspectives on English-Canadian television, Wilfrid Laurier University Press ISBN 978-1-55458-010-1
- Melnyk, George. One Hundred Years of Canadian Cinema. U. of Toronto Press, 2004. 361 pp.
- Morris, Peter (1978). Embattled shadows: a history of Canadian cinema, 1895-1939, McGill-Queen's University Press, ISBN 978-0-7735-0322-9
- Wise, Wyndham, ed. Essential guide to Canadian film. 2001

=== Literature ===
- Hammill, Faye (2007), Canadian literature, Edinburgh Univ. Press, ISBN 978-0-7486-2162-0
- Heath, Jeffrey M (1991), Profiles in Canadian Literature, Volume 7, Dundurn Press, ISBN 978-1-55002-145-5
- K, Balachand (2007), Canadian literature: an overview, Sarup & Sons, ISBN 978-81-7625-753-4
- New, William H (1990), Native writers and Canadian writing, UBC Press, ISBN 978-0-7748-0370-0
- New, William H (2003), A history of Canadian literature, McGill-Queen's University Press, ISBN 978-0-7735-2597-9
- New, William H (2002), Encyclopedia of literature in Canada, University of Toronto Press, ISBN 978-0-8020-0761-2
- Reingard M. Nischik (2008), History of literature in Canada: English-Canadian and French-Canadian, Camden House, ISBN 978-1-57113-359-5
- Stouck, David (1988), Major Canadian authors : a critical introduction to Canadian literature in English (2nd ed.), University of Nebraska Press, ISBN 978-0-8032-4119-0
- Waterston, Elizabeth (1973), Survey; a short history of Canadian literature, Methuen, ISBN 978-0-458-90930-8

=== Media ===
- Armstrong, Robert (2010), Broadcasting Policy in Canada, University of Toronto Press, ISBN 978-1-4426-4096-2
- Carney, William Wray (2003), In the news: the practice of media relations in Canada, University of Alberta Press, ISBN 978-0-88864-382-7
- Russell, Nick (2005), Morals and the media: ethics in Canadian journalism, Ubc Press, ISBN 978-0-7748-1089-0
- Soderlund, Walter C; Kai Hildebrandt (2005), Canadian newspaper ownership in the era of convergence, University of Alberta Press, ISBN 978-0-88864-439-8
- Taras, David; Maria Bakardjieva; Frits Pannekoek (2007), How Canadians communicate II: media, globalization, and identity, University of Calgary Press, ISBN 978-1-55238-224-0
- Vipond, Mary (2000), The Mass Media In Canada (3rd ed.), James Lorimer & Company, ISBN 978-1-55028-714-1
- Skinner, David; James Robert Compton; Mike Gasher (2005), Converging media, diverging politics - United States and Canada, Lexington Books, ISBN 978-0-7391-0827-7
- Allen, Gene; Daniel J. Robinson (2009), Communicating in Canada's Past: Essays in Media History, University of Toronto Press, ISBN 978-0-8020-9316-5

=== Multiculturalism ===
- Forbes, H.D. (2019). Multiculturalism in Canada: Constructing a Model Multiculture with Multicultural Values. Recovering Political Philosophy. Springer International Publishing. ISBN 978-3-030-19835-0.
- Reitz, Jeffrey G; Mai B Phan; Rupa Banerjee (2009), Multiculturalism and social cohesion: potentials and challenges of diversity, London : Springer, ISBN 978-1-4020-9957-1
- Volk, Terese M (2004), Music, Education, and Multiculturalism: Foundations and Principles, Oxford University Press, ISBN 978-0-19-517975-0
- Banting, Keith; Kymlicka, Will (2010), Canadian Multiculturalism: Global Anxieties and Local Debates (PDF), vol. 23, British Journal of Canadian Studies, archived from the original (PDF) on 2018-12-22
- Garcea, Joseph (2008), Postulations on the Fragmentary Effects of Multiculturalism in Canada, vol. 40, Canadian Ethnic Studies
- Ninette Kelley; Michael J. Trebilcock (2010), The making of the mosaic: a history of Canadian immigration policy, University of Toronto Press, ISBN 978-0-8020-9536-7
- Janice Gross Stein (2007), Uneasy partners: multiculturalism and rights in Canada, Wilfrid Laurier Univ. Press, ISBN 978-1-55458-012-5
- Stephen Tierney (2007), Multiculturalism and the Canadian Constitution, UBC Press, ISBN 978-0-7748-1445-4
- Kristin R. Good (2009), Municipalities and Multiculturalism: The Politics of Immigration in Toronto and Vancouver, University of Toronto Press, ISBN 978-1-4426-0993-8
- Richard J. F. Day (2000), Multiculturalism and the history of Canadian diversity, University of Toronto Press, ISBN 978-0-8020-8075-2
- Eve Haque (2012), Multiculturalism Within a Bilingual Framework: Language, Race, and Belonging in Canada, University of Toronto Press, ISBN 978-1-4426-6089-2
- Yasmeen, Abu-Laban; Stasiulis, Daiva (2000), "Ethnic Pluralism under Siege: Popular and Partisan Opposition to Multiculturalism", Canadian Public Policy, 18 (4): 365–386, JSTOR 3551654

=== Music ===
- Beckwith, John (1997), Music papers: articles and talks by a Canadian composer, 1961-1994, Golden Dog Press, ISBN 978-0-919614-72-7
- Browner, Tara (2009), Music of the First Nations: Tradition and Innovation in Native North America, University of Illinois Press, ISBN 978-0-252-02221-0
- Michael Barclay; Ian Andrew Dylan Jack; Jason Schneider (1 June 2011), Have Not Been the Same: The CanRock Renaissance, 1985-1995, Toronto ON: ECW Press, ISBN 978-1-55490-968-1 2001 ed. ISBN 978-1-55022-475-7, 2010 ed. ISBN 978-1-55022-992-9.
- Edwardson, Ryan (2009), Canuck rock: a history of Canadian popular music, University of Toronto Press, ISBN 978-0-8020-9989-1
- Morey, Carl (1997), Music in Canada: a research and information guide, Routledge, ISBN 978-0-8153-1603-9
- Pegley, Kip (2009), Coming to you wherever you are: MuchMusic, MTV, and youth identities, Wesleyan Univ. Press, ISBN 978-0-8195-6869-4
- Canadian Musical works 1900-1980 a bibliography of general and analytically sources. Ottawa : Canadian Association of Music Libraries, (1983) (ISBN 978-0-9690583-2-8)

=== Sports ===
- Beers, William George (1869), Lacrosse: the national game of Canada, Dawson Brothers
- Culin, Stewart (1975), Games of the North American Indians, Courier Dover Publications, pp. 846 pages, ISBN 978-0-486-23125-9
- Hall, M. Ann (2002), The girl and the game : a history of women's sport in Canada, Broadview Press ISBN 978-1-55111-268-8
- Hart, Cantelon; Jean Harvey (1988), Not just a game: essays in Canadian sport sociology, University of Ottawa Press, ISBN 978-0-7766-0115-1
- Mooney, Maggie (2010), Canada's Top 100: The Greatest Athletes of All Time, Greystone Books, ISBN 978-1-55365-557-2
- O'Brien, Steve (2005), The Canadian Football League: The Phoenix of Professional Sports Leagues, Lulu Press, ISBN 978-1-4116-5860-8
- Podnieks, Andrew (2006), A Canadian Saturday Night: Hockey and the Culture of a Country, Greystone Books, ISBN 978-1-55365-201-4
- Wieting, Stephen G (2001), Sport and memory in North America, Frank Cass, ISBN 978-0-7146-8205-1
- Zawadzki, Edward (2004), The Ultimate Canadian Sports Trivia Book, Volume 2, Dundurn Group, ISBN 978-1-55002-529-3

== Provinces and territories ==
- Moore, Christopher; Slavin, Bill; Janet Lunn (2002), The Big Book of Canada: Exploring the Provinces and Territories, Tundra Books, ISBN 978-0-88776-457-8

== Canadian style guides ==
- "The Canadian style: a guide to writing and editing : : S2-158/1996E". Government of Canada Publications. Jul 1, 2002.
  - "Writing resources—Writing guidelines – Collection of Canadian language resources". Canada.ca. Translation Bureau - Government of Canada.
- "TERMIUM Plus -Writing Tips Plus – Writing Tools". Canada.ca. Translation Bureau - Government of Canada.
- Canada. Secretary of State (1997). The Canadian Style: A Guide to Writing and Editing. Dundurn Press. ISBN 978-1-55488-317-2.
- "Writing and Editing Style Guides". The Canadian Press. Jul 14, 2023.
- The Canadian Oxford Dictionary. Oxford University Press. Jan 1, 2004. doi:10.1093/acref/9780195418163.001.0001. ISBN 978-0-19-541816-3.
- Virag, Karen Jean (15 May 2015). Editing Canadian English. Editors' Association of Canada. ISBN 978-0-9869456-1-8.
- McFarlane, J.A.; Clements, W. (1998). The Globe and Mail Style Book: A Guide to Language and Usage. McClelland & Stewart. ISBN 978-0-7710-3337-7.
- Adams, Rob Colter (2005), Grammar to go: the portable A-Zed guide to Canadian usage, House of Anansi Press, ISBN 978-0-88784-723-3, archived from the original on 11 April 2023
- Boberg, Charles (2010). The English Language in Canada: Status, History and Comparative Analysis. Cambridge University Press. ISBN 978-0-511-78981-6. Archived from the original on 11 April 2023.
- Labov, William; Ash, Sharon & Boberg, Charles (2006). The Atlas of North American English. Mouton de Gruyter. ISBN 978-3-11-016746-7. Archived from the original on 11 April 2023.

== See also ==
- Outline of Canada
- Historiography of Canada
- List of Canadian historians
- Canadian studies
- Surveys

=== Internal Wikipedia resources ===
Main project: Wikipedia:WikiProject Resource Exchange

Main page: Wikipedia:WikiProject Resource Exchange/Shared Resources

Requests: Wikipedia:WikiProject Resource Exchange/Resource Request

- Wikipedia:Book sources
- Wikipedia:Journal sources
- Wikipedia:List of online newspaper archives
  - List of academic databases and search engines
  - List of digital library projects
  - List of scientific journals
  - List of digital library projects
  - List of online databases
  - List of online encyclopedias
  - List of educational video websites
  - List of neuroscience databases
