= Gentilcore =

Gentilcore is a surname. Notable people with the surname include:

- Catherine Gentilcore (born 1985), Canadian politician in Quebec
- David Gentilcore (born 1961), Canadian professor of Modern History
- Rocco Louis Gentilcore (1924–1993), Canadian geography professor and author
