= Winham =

Winham is a surname. Notable people with the surname include:

- Gilbert Winham (1938–2019), American-born political scientist
- Godfrey Winham (1934–1975), English music theorist and composer
- Lave Winham (1881–1951), American baseball player
