= Rebecca Tiessen =

Canadian academic

- Born: Rebecca Lee Tiessen; 1970 (age 55–56); Leamington, Ontario, Canada
- Occupation: Academic
- Employer: University of Ottawa

Rebecca Tiessen (b. 1970) is a Canadian academic whose work focuses on international development and gender. She assisted Global Affairs Canada in developing tools to measure the effectiveness of development projects. Her work typically evaluates whether development strategies utilized by bureaucracies can be transformational or whether change within systems is hampered and requires an outside structure to be effective. She served as chair of international development studies and director of the Centre for African Studies in Halifax, Nova Scotia at Dalhousie University from 1999 until 2007. That year, she became an associate professor of sociology at the Royal Military College of Canada in Kingston, Ontario. She joined the faculty of the University of Ottawa in 2013 and is currently a full professor and director of their Gender, Peace, and Security Collaboratory.

== Early life and education ==
Rebecca Lee Tiessen was born in 1970 in Leamington, Ontario. Tiessen was the daughter of Erika (née Penner) Tiessen, who had immigrated as an infant in the late 1940s from Peckelsheim, Germany, to Canada. Erika's parents, Helen and John Penner, were Mennonites and farmed in what is now Point Pelee National Park. Erika married in 1964, divorced in 1981 and raised her daughter and two sons in Leamington. Tiessen obtained a bachelor's degree in political science from Wilfrid Laurier University in 1993. She completed her master's degree in 1995 with a thesis titled Treading Water: Survival Strategies by Smallscale Women Farmers in Zimbabwe from the University of Guelph. Continuing her education, Tiessen completed her PhD at Guelph under the guidance of Belinda Leach in 1999 with a thesis titled Navigating Gender Terrain: Gender Inequality and Environmental Non-Governmental Organizations (ENGOS).

== Career ==
After graduating, Tiessen was hired in 1999, as an assistant professor in International Development Studies at Dalhousie University in Halifax, Nova Scotia. Her research focused on Canadian foreign aid policies, and specifically examined those policies dealing with gender mainstreaming and the HIV/AIDs crisis in Africa. She participated in field research in Indonesia, Kenya, Malawi, Sri Lanka, and Zimbabwe examining the relationships between NGO partners and local populations, and evaluating youth work and study-abroad programs which attempt to promote global citizenship. In 2006, she was promoted to chair of the International Development Studies department and Director of the Centre for African Studies. Thiessen left Dalhousie and became the Canada Research Chair of Global Studies at the Royal Military College of Canada from 2007 to 2013. Her research focus remained as gender inequality and people's security in the Global South, global citizenship, and youth volunteer programs. She continued to conduct research abroad, focusing on countries in sub-Saharan Africa.

Tiessen became an assistant professor at the University of Ottawa in 2013, working in global studies and international development. By 2020, she was a full professor and the associate director of the School of International Development and Global Studies. In addition to her work as a professor, Tiessen assisted Global Affairs Canada, the Canadian foreign affairs department, in designing tools which measure the impact of development funding and projects. The goal was to eliminate the practice of counting only the number of participants and funding in empowerment and equality projects, and instead evaluate in a qualitative manner whether target goals were reached. For example, an audit looking at global aid funding in Canada from 2018 to 2021 revealed that funds targeted for development in Africa had been diverted for the COVID-19 pandemic and the Russo-Ukrainian War. The audit also found that poor tracking made it difficult to evaluate funds spent if recipients of aid met more than one development target. In other words, better accounting of funds was needed to see if goals had been reached if a recipient was both disabled and a child, or elderly and a woman, for example. As of 2024, Tiessen was serving as director of the University of Ottawa's Gender, Peace, and Security Collaboratory.

== Selected works ==
- Tiessen, Rebecca (August 1999). Navigating Gender Terrain: Gender Inequality and Environmental Non-Governmental Organizations (ENGOS) (PDF) (PhD). Guelph, Ontario: University of Guelph. Archived (PDF) from the original on 2 October 2024.
- Tiessen, Rebecca (2007). Everywhere/Nowhere: Gender Mainstreaming in Development Agencies. Bloomfield, Connecticut: Kumarian Press. ISBN 978-1-56549-238-7.
- Rao, Aruna; Tiessen, Rebecca (2008). "11. Has Gender Mainstreaming Been Effective?". In Charlton, Mark; Rowe, Paul (eds.). Crosscurrents: International Development. Toronto, Canada: Thomson Nelson. pp. 249–272. ISBN 978-0-17-610477-1.
- Tiessen, Rebecca; Heron, Barbara (February 2012). "Volunteering in the Developing World: The Perceived Impacts of Canadian Youth". Development in Practice. 22 (1). Abingdon-on-Thames, Oxfordshire: Taylor & Francis: 44–56. doi:10.1080/09614524.2012.630982. ISSN 0961-4524. OCLC 9974373808.
- Tiessen, Rebecca; Huish, Robert, eds. (2013). Globetrotting or Global Citizenship?: Perils and Potential of International Experiential Learning. Toronto, Ontario: University of Toronto Press. ISBN 978-1-4426-4834-0.
- Tiessen, Rebecca; Lough, Benjamin J. (May 2019). "International Volunteering Capacity Development: Volunteer Partner Organization Experiences of Mitigating Factors for Effective Practice". Forum for Development Studies. 46 (2). Oxford, Oxfordshire: Taylor & Francis: 299–320. doi:10.1080/08039410.2018.1529701. ISSN 0803-9410. OCLC 10310041029.
- Tiessen, Rebecca (2024). "13. Aid and Development". In Aggestam, Karin; True, Jacqui (eds.). Feminist Foreign Policy Analysis: A New Subfield. Bristol, UK: Bristol University Press. pp. 183–198. ISBN 978-1-5292-3946-1.
