= David Gentilcore =

Canadian academic (born 1961)

- Born: 1961 (age 64–65); Hamilton, Canada
- Occupation: Professor
- Organization: Ca' Foscari University of Venice

David Gentilcore (born 1961) is Professor of Modern History at the Ca' Foscari University of Venice, now retired. He joined the University of Leicester in 1994, which he left in 2019, in the wake of threats of a no-deal Brexit, in order to take up a five-year European Research Council grant. He has particular interests in the history of popular religion, the history of medicine and health, the history of food and diet, and the cultures of water, in Italy and Europe more broadly.

His Medical Charlatanism in Early Modern Italy (Oxford University Press, 2006) was awarded the Royal Society of Canada's "Dr Jason A. Hannah medal" in 2008 and in 2012 he was awarded the "Salvatore De Renzi International Prize" for his contribution to the history of medicine, by the University of Salerno medical school and the Ordine dei Medici of Salerno. In addition to his books, he has published numerous research articles, in a range of scholarly journals, including Past & Present, Medical History, Social History of Medicine, Folklore, Food & History, the Journal of the History of Medicine and Allied Sciences, Water History, the Bulletin of the History of Medicine, and Technology and Culture.

He has held visiting professorships at McMaster University (Canada) and Villa I Tatti (The Harvard Center for Italian Renaissance Studies), Florence, and visiting fellowships at IMéRA - Institute for Advanced Study, Aix-Marseille University (France) and the School of Advanced Study, University of London. He has been the recipient of research grants from the European Research Council (a five-year Advanced Grant focusing on the 'water cultures' of early and late modern Italy), the European Institutes for Advanced Study Fellowship Programme, the Economic and Social Research Council, the Wellcome Trust, the Leverhulme Trust, and the Arts and Humanities Research Board (now AHRC).

At Ca' Foscari he served on the board of NICHE, the Centre for Environmental Humanities. He is the son of historical geographer Rocco Louis Gentilcore.

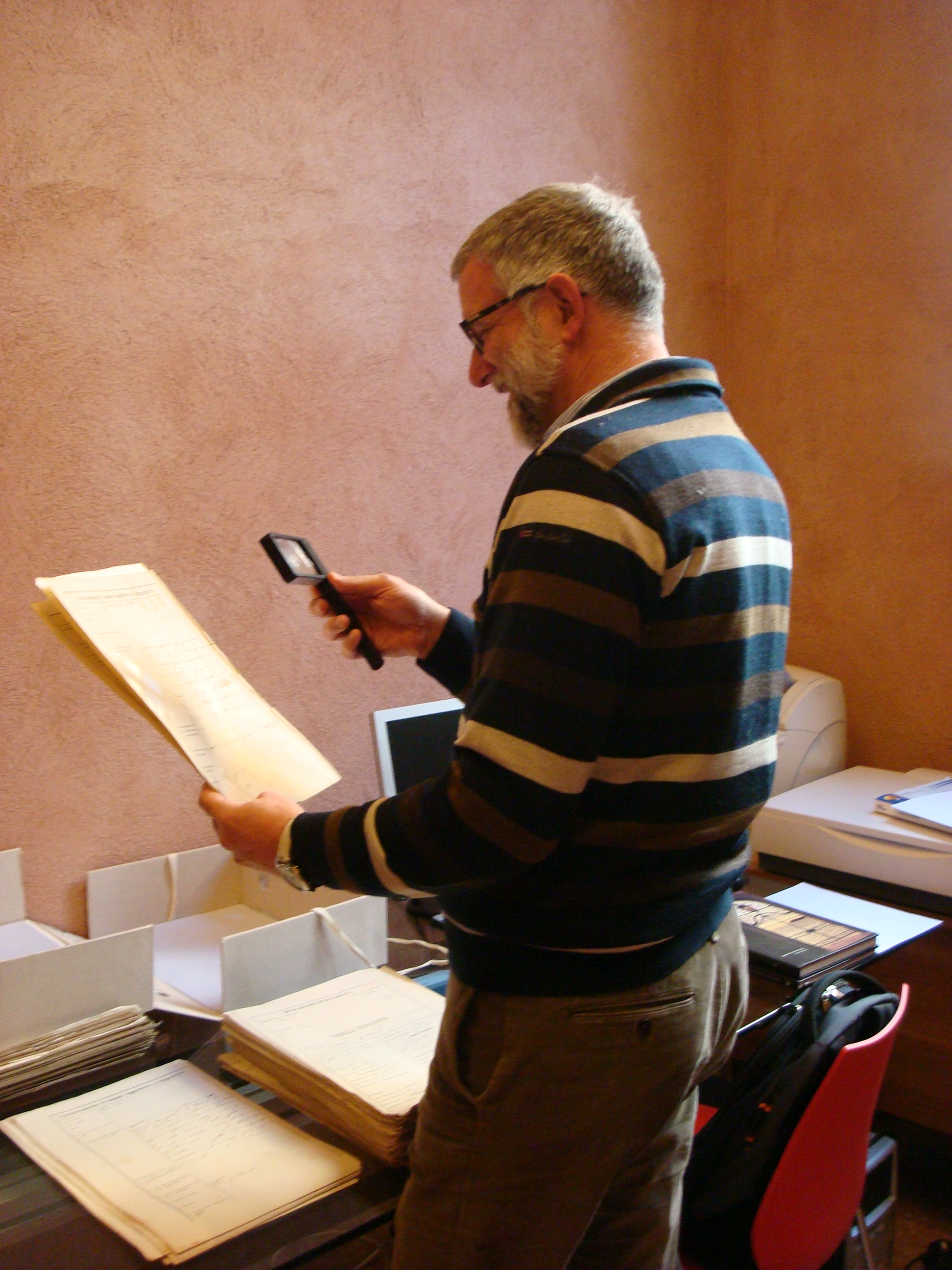
In the archives

== Published books ==
- From Bishop to Witch: The System of the Sacred in Early Modern Terra d'Otranto (Manchester: Manchester University Press, 1992). Italian trans. Il vescovo e la strega (Nardò: Besa Editrice, 2003).
- Healers and Healing in Early Modern Italy (Manchester: Manchester University Press, 1998).
- Medical Charlatanism in Early Modern Italy (Oxford: Oxford University Press, 2006).
- Malattia e guarigione. Ciarlatani, guaritori e seri professionisti (Nardò: Edizioni ControLuce, 2008).
- Pomodoro! A History of the Tomato in Italy (New York: Columbia University Press, 2010). Italian trans. La purpurea meraviglia. Storia del pomodoro in Italia (Milan: Garzanti, 2010).
- Italy and the Potato: a History, 1550-2000 (London: Continuum, 2012). Italian trans. Italiani mangiapatate. Fortuna e sfortuna della patata nel Belpaese (Bologna: il Mulino, 2013).
- Food and Health in Early Modern Europe (London: Bloomsbury, 2016).
- co-editor (with Matthew Smith), Proteins, Pathologies and Politics: Dietary Innovation and Disease from the Nineteenth Century (London: Bloomsbury, 2018)
- co-author (with clinical psychologist Egidio Priani), Pellagra and Pellagrous Insanity During the Long Nineteenth Century (Palgrave Macmillan, 2023: open access)
- co-editor (with Gaia Bruno), I disegni e i discorsi di Giovanni Antonio Nigrone, vol. II "fontanaro e ingegniero de acqua" (1585-1609 ca.) (Rome: Viella, 2024: open access)
- "Cose rare e ammirande del nuovo mondo". Le piante commestibili americane nell'editoria veneziana tra Cinque e Settecento (Venice: Marsilio, 2024)
