= Gilbert Winham =

American political scientist (1938–2019)

Gilbert Rathbone Winham (11 May 1938 – 1 January 2019) was an American-born political scientist.

== Early life ==
Winham was born in New York City on 11 May 1938 to parents Alfred R. Winham and Margery Rankin Post. Winham served in the United States Navy for three years prior to attending the University of Manchester, where he earned a diploma in international law. Following the completion of a doctorate at the University of North Carolina at Chapel Hill, Winham taught at McMaster University. He joined the Dalhousie University faculty in 1975 and retired in 2003. Winham was made a fellow of the Royal Society of Canada in 1994. He died in Berwick, Nova Scotia on 1 January 2019, aged 80.
