= Rocco Louis Gentilcore =

Canadian geographer (1924–1993)

Rocco Louis Gentilcore (born Welland, Ontario, Canada, June 9, 1924; died Hamilton, Ontario, Canada, October 28, 1993) was an author and a professor of historical geography at McMaster University, in Hamilton, in what is now the School of Earth, Environment & Society. His parents were emigrants from the town of Molinara in the Campania region of Italy. He studied at the University of Toronto and obtained his PhD from the University of Maryland. His research was on the historical geography of Canada, and, in particular, settlement development in eastern Canada during the nineteenth century. He edited the second volume of the Historical Atlas of Canada, a three-volume collaborative research and publishing project, undertaken by University of Toronto Press and finished in 1993, which used maps, text and other graphics to explore themes in the history of Canada. In 1989, the R. Louis Gentilcore Prize was established on the occasion of his retirement from the Department of Geography, McMaster University. In 1994 he was awarded the Gold Medal of the Royal Canadian Geographical Society. He had three children: David Gentilcore is a historian at the University of Venice Ca' Foscari (Italy), Roxanne Gentilcore is assistant professor of classics at Saint Anselm College, in New Hampshire, United States, and Susan Gentilcore (1966-2022).

== Published books ==
- Canada's Changing Geography: A Selection of Readings. Scarborough, Ontario: Prentice-Hall of Canada, 1967.
- Geographical Approaches to Canadian Problems: A Selection of Readings. Scarborough, Ontario: Prentice-Hall of Canada, 1971.
- Ontario. Toronto : University of Toronto Press, 1972.
- (with C. Grant Head) Ontario's History in Maps. Toronto: University of Toronto Press, 1984.
- Historical Atlas of Canada, volume II, The Land Transformed, 1800-1891. Toronto: University of Toronto Press, 1993.
