= Scouting in Minnesota =

Scouting in Minnesota has a long history, from the 1910s to the present day, serving thousands of youth in programs that suit the environment in which they live.

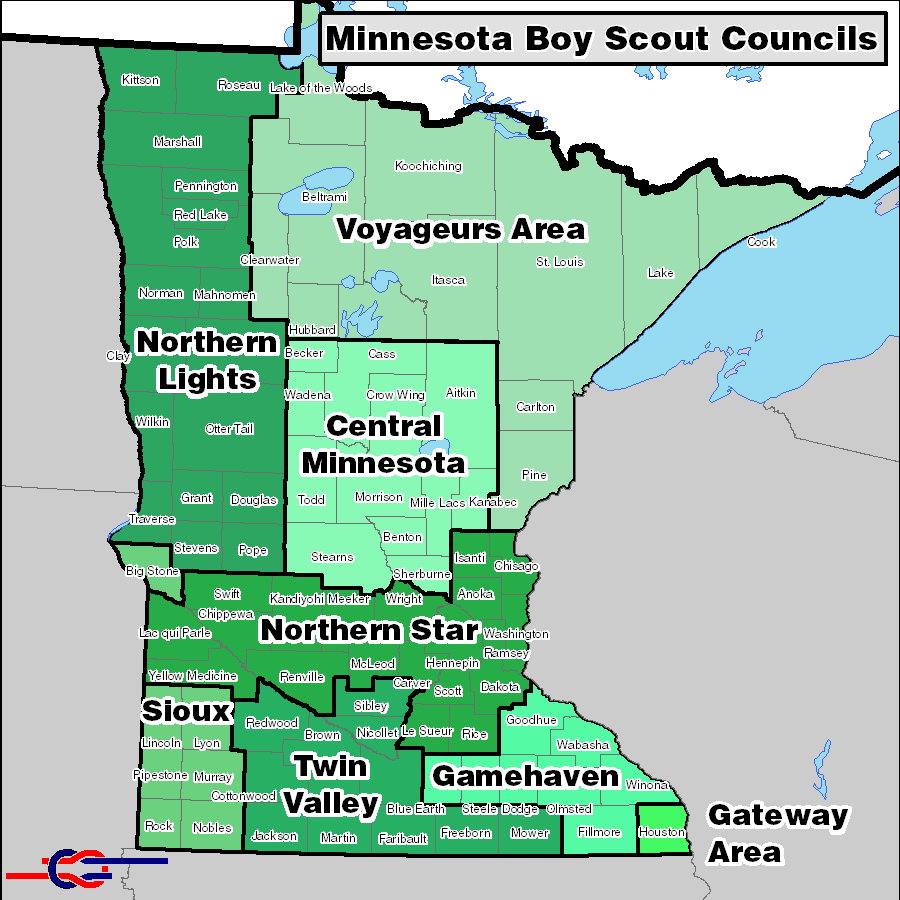
BSA Councils serving Minnesota.

== Scouting America in Minnesota ==
There are seven Scouting America local councils serving Minnesota. In addition, the Northern Tier National High Adventure Bases of Scouting America is located in Minnesota.

=== Central Minnesota Council ===
CMC is headquartered in Sartell, Minnesota. The council serves 46 communities in the area, ranging from Nevis and Park Rapids in the northwest to Elk River in the southeast.

Central Minnesota Council is made up of four districts:

- North Star District
- Pine Tree District
- Scenic District
- Gateway District

==== Parker Scout Reservation ====
Central Minnesota Council is home to Parker Scout Reservation, which was established in 1941 by Clyde Parker. The Camp sits on 256 acres (1.0 km^{2}) of wooded land on North Long Lake north of Brainerd, Minnesota.

==== Naguonabe Lodge ====
The Central Minnesota Council is supported by Naguonabe Lodge #31 of the Order of the Arrow. Naguonabe Lodge #31 was founded in 1927.

=== Gamehaven Council ===
Gamehaven Scouting serves seven counties in southeast Minnesota. From its council office located in Rochester, Minnesota.

Gamehaven Scouting consists of these districts:

- Hiawatha District
- Sugar Loaf District
- Wakpaota District

==== Blue Ox Lodge ====
Gamehaven Scouting is supported by Blue Ox Lodge #26 of the Order of the Arrow.

==== Gamehaven Paddles ====
Gamehaven Scouting has volunteers certified by the American Canoe Association in canoeing and kayaking. Youth awards and leader training are available to in-council, other councils, and the public. The council's kayak fleet ranges from recreational kayaks appropriate for Webelos Scouts to kayaks suitable for training for Lake Superior and Seabase trips. Gamehaven provides solo canoe training with Wenonah Argosy solo canoes and traditional tandem canoeing.

=== Gateway Area Council ===
Gateway Area Council serves Scouts in Wisconsin and Minnesota.

=== Northern Star Council ===
Headquartered in Fort Snelling, Minnesota, Northern Star Council was formed from the merger of Viking Council and Indianhead Council in 2005. Voyageurs Area Council subsequently merged into Northern Star Council in 2024.

=== Northern Lights Council ===
As of 2006, Northern Lights Council serves all of North Dakota, and parts of South Dakota, northwest Minnesota and northeast Montana. Voyageur Trails District, Prairie Fire, Northern Lakes, and Northern Sky are the Districts in Minnesota.

==== Camp Wilderness ====
Northern Lights Council is home to Camp Wilderness, located on Bad Axe Lake near Emmaville, Minnesota in Hubbard County, Minnesota. Founded by Herman Stern in 1946, Camp Wilderness is a 2,400-acre (10 km^{2}) camp. On August 18, 2006, the camp celebrated its 60th anniversary by opening the Butler Wilderness Outpost, a Cub Scout camp for the scouts to attend. Camp Wilderness is, by area, the largest Scouts camp owned and operated by a Minnesota Scouting Council, although Scouting America owns the much larger Philmont Scout Ranch in New Mexico, and the slightly larger Charles L. Sommers Northern Tier Base, also located in Minnesota.

=== Sioux Council ===
Headquartered in Sioux Falls, South Dakota, Sioux Council serves Scouts in South Dakota, Iowa and Minnesota.

- Buffalo Ridge District serves Lincoln, Lyon, and Murray counties in Minnesota. Camp Shetek is located in Murray County on Lake Shetek near Currie, Minnesota.
- Prairie Hills District serves Pipestone, Nobles, and Rock counties in Minnesota.

=== Twin Valley Council ===
Located in Mankato MN.

- River Stone District
- Cedar Valley District
- Western Prairie District

==== Cuyuna Scout Camp ====
Twin Valley Council is home to Cuyuna Scout Camp, established as Camp Cuyuna in 1967. The Camp sits on 680 acres (2.8 km^{2}) of wooded land surrounded by six lakes (Goodrich, Little Pickerel, Big Pickerel, Lily, Grass, Cranberry). Additionally, Lake Russell (originally Command Lake) sits entirely within the boundaries of Cuyuna Scout Camp. Cuyuna Scout Camp ("Cuyuna," for short) is located northeast of Crosslake, Minnesota. Campsites are arranged for scouts to sleep and eat as patrols with a central troop assembly area. Patrols draw their rations from a central Commissary and cook all of their meals together except for two Camp-wide meals, on Sunday and Friday nights.

== Girl Scouting in Minnesota ==
Map of Girl Scout Councils in Minnesota

Three Girl Scout Councils serve Minnesota.

=== Girl Scouts - Dakota Horizons ===
See Scouting in South Dakota. Serves a large portion of northwestern Minnesota and Rock County in southwestern Minnesota.

Headquarters: Sioux Falls, South Dakota

=== Girl Scouts of Minnesota and Wisconsin Lakes and Pines Council ===
Lakes and Pines Council serves 11,000 girls in 39 counties throughout the northern half of Minnesota and northwest corner of Wisconsin. Northern Pine and Land of Lakes Councils joined together Jan. 1, 2008 to form Girl Scouts of Minnesota and Wisconsin Lakes and Pines.

Headquarters: Waite Park, Minnesota

Camps:

- Camp Roundelay is 620 acres (2.5 km^{2}) near Minong, Wisconsin
- Northern Lakes Canoe Base is 20 miles (32 km) north of Ely, Minnesota and near the Boundary Waters Canoe Area Wilderness
- Camp Shingobee Timbers is 170 acres (0.69 km^{2}) in Chippewa National Forest near Walker, Minnesota
- Camp Sanderson is 33 acres (130,000 m^{2}) near Spicer, MN.

=== Girl Scouts of Minnesota and Wisconsin River Valleys ===
In partnership with 18,000 adult volunteers, the Girl Scouts of Minnesota and Wisconsin River Valleys helps nearly 45,000 girls each year—in all or portions of 49 counties in southern Minnesota and western Wisconsin.

Headquarters: St. Paul, Minnesota

Camps:

- Camp Elk River is 1,200 acres (4.9 km^{2}) near Zimmerman, MN.
- Camp Lakamaga is near Marine, MN.
- Camp Northwoods is 420 acres (1.7 km^{2}) near Mason, WI.
- Camp Singing Hills is 160 acres (0.65 km^{2}) near Waterville, MN
- Camp Whispering Hills is near Houston, MN

== Scouting museums in Minnesota ==
- Many Point Scout Camp History Center
- North Star Museum of Boy Scouting and Girl Scouting, North Saint Paul, Minnesota

== See also ==
- Scouting in Manitoba
- Scouting in Ontario
