= Straus Clothing =

Garments seller

Straus Clothing was the oldest family-owned retailer in North Dakota when it closed in January 2016.

== History ==
=== First Generation ===
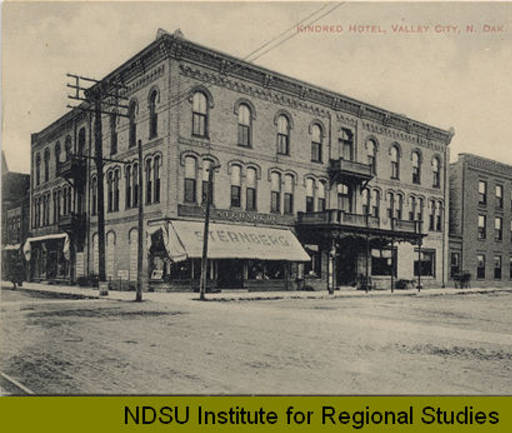
Postcard of the Kindred Hotel in Valley City, North Dakota, with the awning of the Sternberg Clothing Store, operated by Adolph Sternberg in that building from 1882 until his death in 1908.

The Straus/Stern family entered the clothing business in North Dakota in 1879 when German-Jewish-American brothers Adolph and Isaac Sternberg opened a clothing store in Sanborn, North Dakota. In 1882, after Valley City was chosen as the seat of Barnes County, they relocated the business 13 miles away to Valley City, opening a "New York One Price Clothing House" on the first floor of the new Kindred Hotel. Isaac retired a few years later, and Adolph died in 1908. Meanwhile, Adolph Sternberg's wife Anna encouraged her niece Frederecka (Rickie)'s husband Morris G. Straus to open a clothing business in Casselton, 40 miles away, in 1897. This was also a "one-price" store, with prices posted for each item.

In 1903, M. G. Straus recruited his cousin Herman Stern from Germany to come to Casselton and assist with the running of the Straus clothing store (although he was likely also looking for a suitable bachelor to marry his wife's much younger sister, Adeline Roth). After purchasing the larger Sternberg store in Valley City following Adolph's death in 1908, Straus left Stern in charge of the Casselton store until 1910, when he sent Stern to work in the Valley City store and returned to Casselton.

Morris Straus retired to San Diego in 1920, selling Straus Clothing to Stern.

=== Second Generation ===
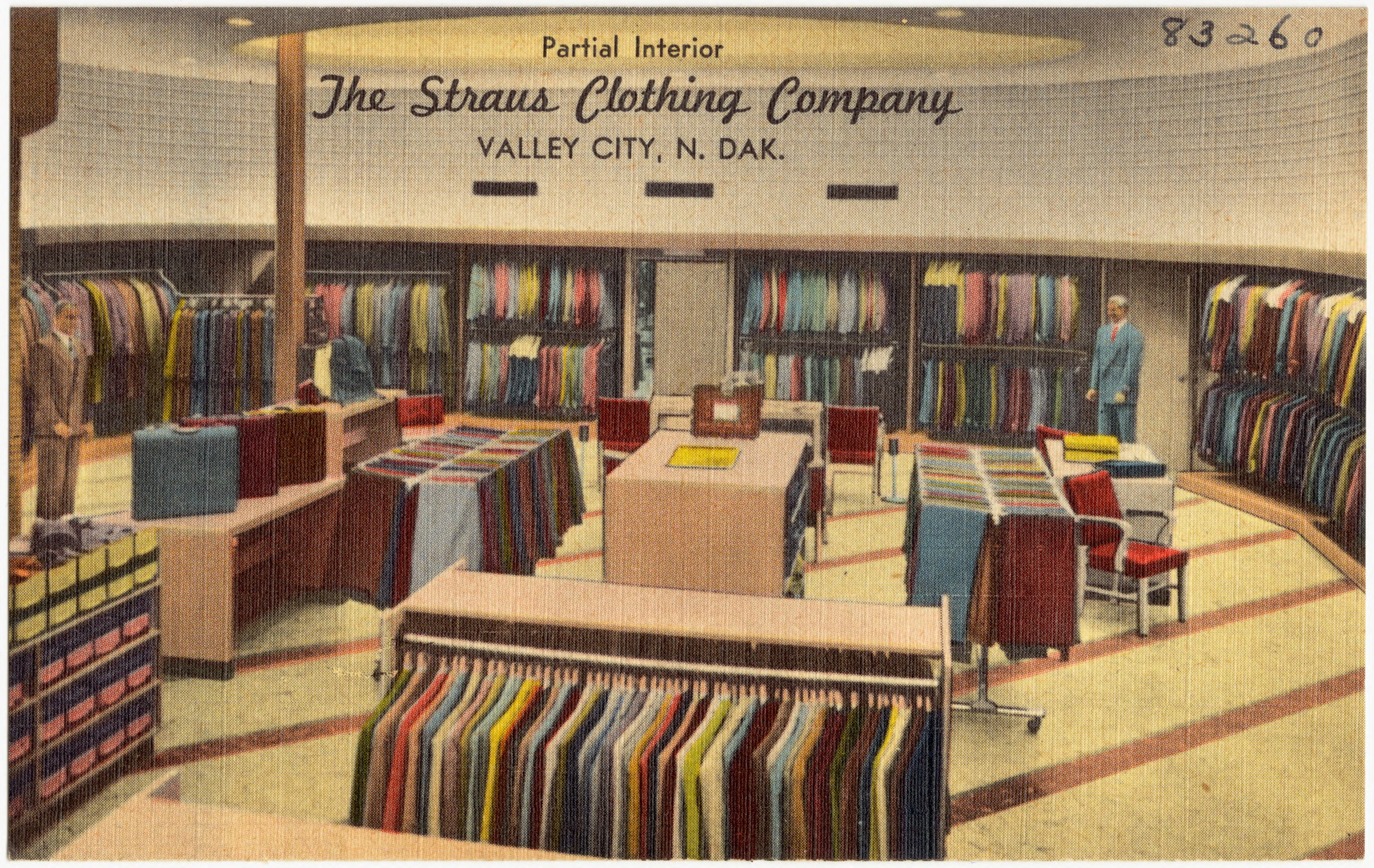
Postcard of the interior of Straus Clothing between 1937 and 1945

Around the time Straus purchased the Valley City store, he recruited another cousin, Leo Straus, to help manage this store. Leo Straus married Adolph and Anna Sternberg's daughter Elsie in 1912, the same year that Herman Stern married Adeline Roth. However, in 1916, Leo Straus left to work in the silk industry in Paterson, New Jersey, selling his interest in Straus Clothing to M. G. Straus and Herman Stern, and making Stern the manager of the Valley City store. (Leo Straus's daughter would marry Joseph Weber; his younger son would marry Kathleen N. Straus)

Herman Stern's business prospered in the 1920s. He enlarged the Valley City store in 1926, and opened new stores in Lamoure in 1927 and in Carrington in 1929. However, poor economic conditions during the Great Depression led to the closure of the Lamoure store and the sale of the Carrington store to the Carrington store manager in 1933. The Straus stores sold workers' overalls at a loss and tried adding groceries to the Straus inventory to bring in customers and keep the remaining stores alive.

As the depression ebbed, business conditions improved. The Valley City store was completely remodeled in 1937. In 1939, Herman Stern purchased The Esquire Shop in Fargo for $1200, which was managed by his younger son Ed. At the time, the other menswear store in Fargo was the "Alex Stern Company," and so Herman and Ed Stern continued to maintain the Straus name to avoid confusion. Ed moved the Fargo store to Broadway in 1941, but then left to serve in the U.S. Army for the next four years.

In 1945, Stern purchased the Kindred hotel building which housed the original Valley City store in 1945, and in 1949-50 he had it demolished and replaced by a modern building. The celebration for the new store opening was attended by more than 2,000 people, including the state's governor. This was the first store in North Dakota with air conditioning.

=== Third Generation ===
Fire at the Straus store in Fargo, April 14, 1963

Herman's son Edward Stern began work with Straus Clothing as a salesman in 1932. His parents sent him to attend the Wharton School of Business in Philadelphia, but he returned to North Dakota in 1936 to work for Straus Clothing and be near his high school sweetheart, Louise McCutcheon.

Ed Stern oversaw a major expansion in the Straus business during the prosperous post-war period. In 1955, Straus purchased the former Havig store in Grand Forks, and opened a location there, with a second Grand Fork's location opening in 1966. In 1957, Straus bought the former Globe store in Fargo, and opened a second Fargo branch in that location. In 1970, Straus bought the former Beck’s store in Jamestown, opening a branch there. A fire destroyed the downtown Fargo store in 1963 (intentionally set by the manager of the business next door, in an attempt to hide the embezzlement of funds from auditors), but Straus rebuilt and reopened in the same location. Before Fargo's first shopping mall opened in 1972, Straus Clothing was the first to negotiate a contract for a store in that space. In the mid-1970s, the Stern family opened their own multi-level small shopping mall in Valley City, with Straus Clothing as the anchor store.

=== Fourth Generation ===
Ed Stern turned over the Straus Clothing business to two of his sons, John and Rick Stern, in the 1980s, although he remained president of the Straus company until 1997. By this time, Straus Clothing was the best-selling men's retailer in the region, with 10 stores. However, the next decade and a half were difficult for independent menswear retailers. Four of the Straus stores were located in downtown shopping districts in North Dakota, which saw less business as shoppers departed for malls. Discount chains, such as Walmart were expanding rapidly, offering unbeatable prices. Meanwhile, men were dressing more casually for work, reducing demand for suits. Straus shifted the mix of menswear offered and reduced prices, but by 1997, only two Straus stores remained open, in Fargo and Jamestown.

In late 2015, with none of their children interested in taking over the business, Rick and John Stern announced the closure of Straus Clothing in January, 2016.

=== Fifth Generation ===
Straus Clothing quickly reopened after its closure. Shortly thereafter, Chad Herring, step-son of John Stern, along with his wife Dorene, announced their intentions to revive the store. Chad, who had previously worked at the Straus store in Fargo's West Acres mall during his twenties, returned to the area after gaining experience in various other businesses. Twenty five years later, he decided that he had really enjoyed working for Straus Clothing, and returned to Fargo to re-open the store, now called "Straus for Men" in November, 2016. However, Herring announced the closure of the new store in March 2018, citing poor sales.

== Tradition of civic engagement ==
For generations, the leaders of Straus Clothing were not only businesspeople, but civic leaders.

Adoph Sternberg was a director of the First National Bank, a trustee of the State Normal School at Valley City, which later became Valley City State University, and a Mason. His wife Anna was the first president of the Valley City Tuesday Club, the second oldest women's club in North Dakota, and the force behind the establishment of a Carnegie library in Valley City.

Herman Stern was posthumously awarded the North Dakota Rough Rider Award in 2014 for his many contributions to the state. He founded the Greater North Dakota Association in 1924, now known as the Greater North Dakota Chamber, and served as that organization’s first president. He founded the North Dakota Winter Show, a winter agriculture show that is still in existence. He founded the Community Chest, which became the United Way of Barnes County, and was active in Rotary and the Masonic Order. He was a champion of the Boy Scouts of America, helping to establish boy scout councils in Fargo, Valley City, Wahpeton and Grand Forks, and raising money to build boy scout Camp Wilderness in nearby Minnesota, and was awarded the Silver Buffalo Award in 1974 for his efforts on behalf of the boy scouts. Between about 1934 and 1941, Herman Stern worked tirelessly to rescue more than 140 German Jews from the Holocaust by bringing them to the United States, beginning with members of his own family, and eventually helping more distant relatives, friends, and acquaintances.

Edward Stern was a WWII veteran, founder of the Fargo-Moorhead Area Foundation, two-term President of the Fargo school board, leader of the Fargo Chamber of Commerce, and president of the Menswear Retailers of America. He was also a Fargo-Moorhead Symphony Orchestra board member, fundraiser, and violist. He was awarded the North Dakota Governor's Award for the Arts and the Fargo Chamber of Commerce Legacy Award.
