= Arrowhead Council =

Arrowhead Council may be:

- Arrowhead Council (Illinois)
- Arrowhead Council (Minnesota)
- Arrowhead Council (South Dakota)
- Arrowhead Council (Texas)
- Arrowhead Area Council (California)
