= History of public health in Canada =

History of public health in Canada covers public health in Canada since the 17th century. The history saw heavy immigration and incremental progress against high death rates. After 1763 the experience came as a British colony and reflected many characteristics of the history of public health in the United Kingdom. Legislative milestones, scientific breakthroughs, and grassroots advocacy collectively modernized a landscape once dominated by disease and high death rates. Hospitals moved from the periphery to the center of public health services and the national budget. Challenges like bad urban sanitation, epidemics, tuberculosis, and infant mortality were largely resolved by the early 20th century.

== Early health history ==
Herbert C. Northcott and Donna M. Wilson emphasize that conditions were severe in the early period:

The harsh climate, tough pioneer existence, low standards of living, and unsanitary practices contributed to many early deaths in the colonies. Infant mortality was high, as was maternal mortality, and life expectancy in general was low. Health care was relatively ineffective, and the few hospitals that existed were considered places of death.

=== Health history of indigenous peoples ===
Scholars have recently given extensive coverage to the health experiences and needs of the Indigenous peoples in Canada.

=== New France ===
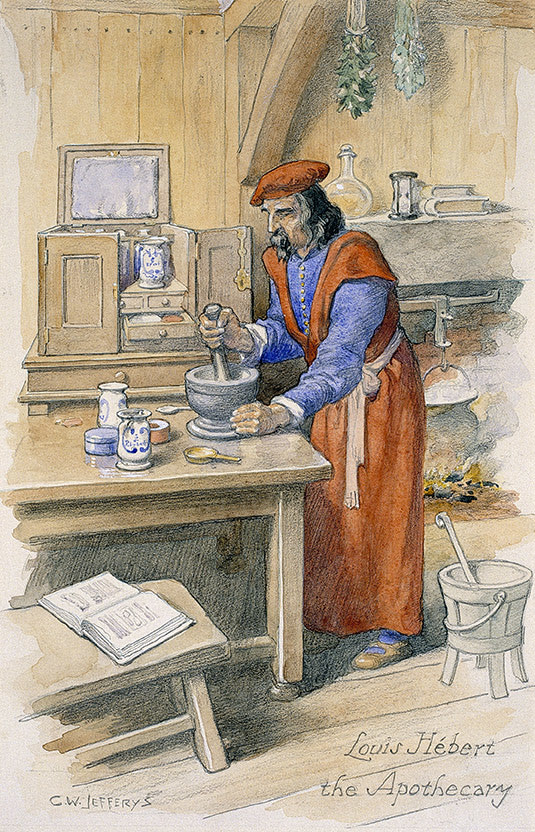
Louis Hébert was physician, surgeon and dispenser of medicines, 1617-1627.

Public health in New France (1608 to 1759) was generally inadequate, despite the presence of a relatively good medical infrastructure. An apothecary, Louis Hébert (1575–1627) in 1617 was engaged by Samuel de Champlain to serve the new colony as physician, surgeon and dispenser of medicines and herbs. After 1685 Michel Sarrazin and François Gaultier served as the King's physician of the colony. The colony opened small hospitals known as "Hôtel-Dieu" in Montréal, Quebec City and Trois-Rivières. These institutions were managed by Catholic Church congregations included surgeons, doctors, apothecaries and healers. They provided care to settlers, soldiers, sailors, and occasionally Native populations. The Hôtel-Dieu in Quebec City cared for an average of 589 people per year from 1689, to 1759. The Congregations organized and financed healthcare services. Their care aimed at both spiritual and physical healing.

The colony faced high mortality rates due to infectious diseases. Epidemics imported from France were deadly. In 1687, measles and typhoid fever killed about 500 people. In 1702-1703, about 8% of the population, died of smallpox. Major epidemics hit in 1715, 1731 and 1785. Medical knowledge was limited, and treatments were often based on old French traditions. The towns were unsanitary, with unpaved streets, free-roaming animals, and lack of proper waste disposal. This led to frequent outbreaks of infectious diseases. Outside the towns the low population density mitigated the spread of diseases and conditions were better than France itself. The "Conseil supérieur" introduced laws to improve urban sanitation, such as requiring latrines and proper waste disposal. The British had full control of New France after 1759 but they made few changes in public health matters. They did add a few British military surgeons. Most of the French medical personnel remained and they followed the old routines, but no longer had replacements from Paris.

=== British colonies ===
Health conditions in British Canada from 1759 to 1867 were marked by high mortality rates, epidemics, and inadequate public health infrastructure. There were frequent outbreaks of smallpox, measles, typhoid fever, and cholera. The germs were usually introduced by immigrants and spread rapidly in urban areas due to poor sanitation and overcrowded housing. Several local boards of health were set up but they had weak powers. A critical decision in 1832 to set up a quarantine station on Grosse Isle helped keep out the germs brought by immigrants from Britain and Ireland.

=== 1847 typhus epidemic ===
The epidemic of 1847 was an outbreak of epidemic typhus caused by a massive Irish emigration in 1847, during the Great Famine. They escaped aboard crowded and disease-ridden "coffin ships". About 90,000 set out for Canada; many died at sea and were buried at sea. Over 20,000 arrived but died in 1847–1848. The government set up twenty-eight emergency relief Boards of Health in Upper Canada. Survivors were quarantined in fever sheds in Grosse Isle, Montreal, Kingston, Toronto and Saint John.

== Late 19th century ==
The major political change came in 1867 with the creation of the Confederation. Policy over public health and medical issues was divided between localities, provinces, and the new national government headquartered in Ottawa.

== 20th century ==
According to T. J Copp, "Montreal was the most dangerous city in the Western world to be born in." Around 1900 27% of all new babies died before they were one year old. That was double the figure for New York City. It was higher than London, but it was surpassed by Calcutta. Infectious germs circulated rapidly in the overcrowded, extremely dirty tenements into which the poor were squeezed. The water was unsafe; the milk was unpasteurized; vaccination was avoided. By contrast, the largest city in Australia, Sydney, was one of the healthiest large cities in the world. In 1901–1905, infant mortality in London was 33% higher than Sydney.

Standardization of vital statistics was a slow process. For example, Ontario in 1869 ordered the compulsory registration of all births, marriages and death by local governments. The localities slowly joined in and full coverage did not arrive until 1900. In 1919, the national government formed the new Department of Health. It designed a registration act to coordinate the vital statistics compiled by the different provinces and sent around a new set of standard forms. By 1926 all provinces were participating.

In the 1910s Saskatchewan, under its chief officer of health, Maurice Macdonald Seymour, became the nation's leader in public health innovation.

=== World War I ===
During 1914 to 1919, half of the nation's medical resources were devoted to the war effort, primarily through the Canadian Army Medical Corps (CAMC). The pre-war army medical corps, founded in 1904, had only 23 officers. It now expanded to include 1,525 medical officers, 1,901 nursing sisters, and 15,624 other ranks. CAMC managed 36,000 hospital beds overseas and 12,000 at home. It included nearly half of all active physicians and a majority of leaders of the professions. They were all needed by the 424,000 men in the Canadian Expeditionary Force (CEF) in France. (Another 200,000 were still at home when the war ended.) Of the front-line soldiers over one-third—154,000—were wounded and survived, and four out of five survivors returned to duty. However, another 12,000 died of wounds. Another 39,000 soldiers were killed outright in combat. Venereal disease became a significant issue, with 29% of all Canadian troops infected by 1915.

== Recent ==
=== Aboriginal policy ===
In 1995, the Government of Canada announced the Aboriginal Right to Self-Government Policy. This policy recognizes that First Nations and Inuit have the constitutional right to shape their own forms of government to suit their particular historical, cultural, political and economic circumstances. The Indian Health Transfer Policy provided a framework for the assumption of control of health services by Indigenous peoples, and set forth a developmental approach to transfer centred on self-determination in health. Through this process, the decision to enter transfer discussions with Health Canada rests with each community. Once involved in transfer, communities can take control of health programme responsibilities at a pace determined by their individual circumstances and health management capabilities.

== Mental health and psychiatry ==
The history of mental health in Canada is marked by several key themes that reflect evolving societal attitudes, institutional practices, and policy reforms. In the colonial era, the family took care of their own mentally. handicapped individuals. Otherwise, local officials put them in jails and poorhouses in deplorable condition. The first local government asylums were opened in the 1830s.

=== Early Institutionalization and Asylums ===
In the 18th and 19th centuries, mental illness was often viewed through a moral or supernatural lens, leading to the confinement of individuals in jails, poorhouses, or asylums under deplorable conditions. Early asylums, such as those in Saint John (1835) and Toronto (1841), were established to provide rudimentary care but often perpetuated stigma and neglect. Reformers like American Dorothea Dix advocated for improved conditions, influencing the establishment of more humane institutions after 1840.

=== National Committee for Mental Hygiene ===
The CMHA, founded in 1918 as the Canadian National Committee for Mental Hygiene, led efforts to raise awareness about mental health issues and combat stigma. The mental health of World war I veterans was a major theme. Initiatives like Mental Health Week (introduced in 1951) helped bring mental health into educational discourse and move from old "biology as destiny" notions to an environmental perspective of the mental health of children.

=== Deinstitutionalization and Community-Based Care ===
Following World War II, there was a shift from long-term institutional care to community-based mental health services. This was driven by advancements in psychiatric treatment, changing societal attitudes, and critiques of institutional abuses. Advocacy expanded in the 1960s and beyond, with campaigns emphasizing mental health parity with physical health and the need for systemic reforms.

=== National programs ===
The federal government began funding mental health initiatives in the mid-20th century through programs like the National Health Grants Program (1948). This laid the groundwork for coordinated provincial services. Reports such as "More for the Mind" (1963) and "Building Community Support for People" (1988) highlighted systemic gaps and recommended comprehensive community-based mental health systems. The creation of the Mental Health Commission of Canada in 2007 marked a significant step toward a national strategy, focusing on promoting mental health across demographics and addressing disparities.

=== Marginalized Groups ===
Efforts to improve access to care for marginalized populations have been a recurring theme. This includes addressing the unique needs of Indigenous peoples, youth, seniors, and rural communities. Recent strategies emphasize reducing disparities in access to services and tailoring approaches to diverse cultural contexts.

Public education campaigns throughout the 20th century aimed to reduce stigma surrounding mental illness. Notable examples include CMHA's "My Dad" campaign since the 1980s, which shifted public attitudes toward empathy and support for those affected by mental illness.

=== Covid-19 2020-2022 ===
The Covid-19 pandemic had a devastating impact on mental health, substance use and homelessness across Canada. It overwhelmed all the agencies for months.

== See also ==
- Healthcare in Canada
  - Medicare (Canada)
- Physicians in Canada
  - College of Family Physicians of Canada
  - Royal College of Physicians and Surgeons of Canada
- History of public health in the United Kingdom
- History of public health in the United States
  - Comparison of the healthcare systems in Canada and the United States
- History of public health in Australia
- Leaders
  - Louis Hébert (1575 – 1627), in 1617 the first medical professional in New France
  - Jeanne Mance (1606–1672) established the first hospital, the Hôtel-Dieu de Montréal, in 1645.
  - Michel Sarrazin (1659–1734), leading surgeon in New France
  - Peter Bryce (1853–1932) researcher and administrator for Ontario and federal governments. He exposed mistreatment of Indigenous students and promoted urban sanitation.
  - Maurice Macdonald Seymour, (1857–1929) in Saskatchewan.
  - Clifford Whittingham Beers, (1876–1943), launched mental hygiene movement and reforms in Saskatchewan
