= Hiawatha Council =

Hiawatha Council may be:

- Hiawatha Council (New York), a district of the Baden-Powell Council of the Boy Scouts of America
- Hiawatha Council (South Dakota), a council, 1926–1927, of the Boy Scouts of America that merged into the Sioux council
- Hiawatha Area Council
