= Valley City Municipal Auditorium =

- U.S. National Register of Historic Places
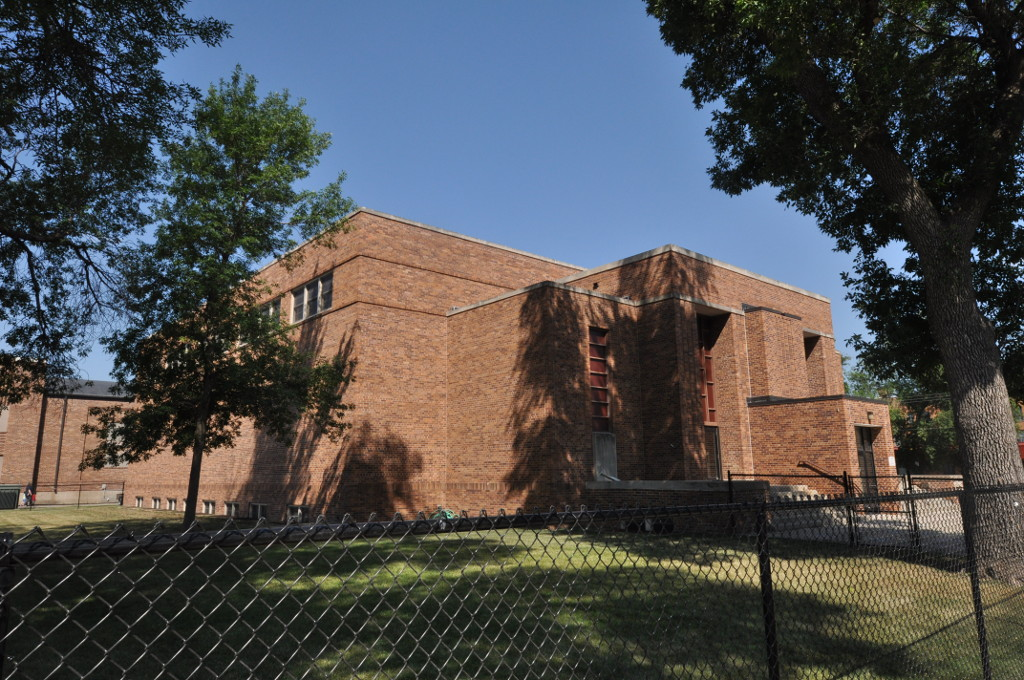

- Location within North Dakota Location within the United States
- Location: 320 Central Ave. S., Valley City, North Dakota
- Coordinates: 46°55′15″N 98°0′11″W
- Area: less than one acre
- Built: 1936
- Built by: Ritterbush Bros.; O.M. Wick
- Architectural style: Modern Movement, Stripped Classicism
- NRHP reference No.: 07001341
- Added to NRHP: January 4, 2008

The Valley City Municipal Auditorium in Valley City, North Dakota was built in 1936. It includes Modern Movement architecture, Stripped Classicism, and other architecture. It was listed on the National Register of Historic Places in 2008.

It was deemed significant for its architecture but primarily for its historic role in the community. The building has enabled the city to be host, since 1938, of the North Dakota Winter Show, and it has hosted many events. One memorable event was Peggy Lee performing with the Dave Barbour Orchestra in shows during March 6–9, 1950.
