= Lewiston Council =

Lewiston Council may be:

- Lewiston Council (Idaho)
- Lewiston Council (Montana)
