= Valley City Public School District =

School district in North Dakota, United States

The Valley City Public School District is a system of public schools serving Valley City, North Dakota and the surrounding rural area.

== Elementary schools ==
- Washington Elementary School
- Jefferson Elementary School

== Junior/Senior High School ==
- Valley City High School
