= Valley City High School =

Coordinates: 46°55′38″N 98°00′14″W

Location
- 493 Central Ave N Valley City, (Barnes County), North Dakota 58072; USA

Information
- Type: Public School
- Motto: Together we are building a legacy of excellence, one student at a time
- Established: 1889
- School district: Valley City Public School District
- Principal: Kristi Brandt/Dan Larson
- Teaching staff: 22.74 (FTE)
- Grades: 7-12
- Enrollment: 318 (2023–2024)
- Student to teacher ratio: 13.98
- Colors: Columbia blue, navy and white
- Mascot: Hi-Liners
- Website: www.hiliners.org/o/jsh

Valley City High School is a public high school located in Valley City, North Dakota. It is a part of the Valley City Public School District system. The school athletic teams are known as the Hi-Liners.

== Athletics ==
=== Championships ===
Parenthesis denotes class/division the year the title was won. Years without parenthesis denote the tournament was one class.

==== Boys Sports ====
- Basketball: 1918, 1920, 1921, 1929, 1945 (A), 1960 (A)
- Cross Country: 2001 (A)
- Football: 1907, 1924, 1936
- Golf: 2010 (B)
- Tennis: 1970 (A)
- Track and Field: 1909

==== Girls Sports ====
- Basketball: 2025 (Division A)
- Cross Country: 1980 (A)
- Golf: 1970 (A), 1971 (A)
- Tennis: 2024 (A)
- Track and Field: 1971 (A), 1973 (A), 1974 (A)

==== Fine Arts ====
- Speech: 1994 (A), 1995 (A), 1999 (A), 2006 (A), 2017 (A), 2018 (A), 2019 (A), 2021 (A), 2022 (A), 2023 (A)
- Student Congress: 1980, 1981

== Notable alumni ==
- Jeff Boschee, coach and former professional basketball player
- Earl Pomeroy, US Congressman
