= The Vault (Coffee Shop) =

American self-serve uncrewed coffee shop and bookstore

The Vault is an unmanned self-serve coffee shop, bakery, book store and center for the arts located in Valley City, North Dakota, United States. In June 2014, The Vault received international attention for its unique business model.

== History ==
The Vault was the result of a three-and-a-half-year renovation project of a former bank building in Valley City, North Dakota. The bank was originally built in 1920 as The Bank of Valley City. This became Farmer's and Merchant Bank, and was later abandoned. The building was purchased in 2000 by Paul Stenshoel, and the main room of the lower level was given to David Brekke in 2009 for use as a coffee shop and community center.

== Honor system ==
The Vault has no employees or price scanners. Customers take products and pay via credit card, check or cash on the honor system. There are cameras, but their main purpose is to provide a safe atmosphere. The food and drink have set prices, but the books are priced as patrons see fit. In an interview, Brekke said that customers have been "15% more honest, than thieving."

== Media coverage ==
On June 20, 2014, Aaron Boerner of KVRR Fargo covered The Vault, focusing on its unique business model. On June 23, the story was aired by CNN nationally. On June 24, the story was aired on TV stations across the United States, leading to a subsequent interview by the New York Daily News.
