= Scouting and Guiding in Saskatchewan =

Scouting in Saskatchewan goes back to the early days of Scouting in Canada in 1908.

== Scouting in Saskatchewan ==
The largest Scouting organisation in Saskatchewan is the Saskatchewan Council of Scouts Canada.

=== Camp Gilwell ===
Camp Gilwell
- Owner: Scouts Canada
- Location: North Qu'Appelle No. 187, near Lebret, Saskatchewan
- Country: Canada
- Coordinates: 50.761649°N 103.718147°W
- Founded: 26 June 1919
- Defunct: March 2009
- Website; Camp Gilwell

Camp Gilwell is a Scouts Canada camp on the shore of Mission Lake near the communities of Lebret, and Mission Lake in southern Saskatchewan. It is just to the south of Highway 56. Due to structural concerns, the main building at the camp was closed in 2008. The northern area of the campsite has been preserved for wilderness camping. However, the camp is equipped with water, toilets, lighted parking, stove, fridge, clothes dryers, and gas furnace. The lodge is 1,000 square feet (93 m^{2}) in size. There is also a 500-square-foot (46 m^{2}) bunk house which is heated, and is supplied with electricity. Swimming is available in the provincial park located within 7 kilometres (4.3 mi). The Scouts Canada committee is considering replacing the building on the 40-acre lot. Constable Mark LeMaistre, leader of the Indian Head Boy Scout troop, worked on improvements to Camp Gilwell in 1979 for use by Boy Scout troops. According to the August 31, 2008 financial statements, the Gilwell building reserve was $16,776 in both 2007 and 2008, and the replacement reserve was 21,295 in 2008 and 14,425 in 2007.

In March 2009 the decision was made by the Saskatchewan Council to close the camp, because of the high demolition and replacement cost for the main lodge that is now structurally unsafe, and the highway and railway crossing risk that exists at the camp location.

==== History ====
Following his service in the North-West Rebellion until 1904, the area was the home to Maurice Macdonald Seymour, Commissioner of Public Health, Government of Saskatchewan The home was donated to the local Boy Scouts becoming a kitchen and meeting area of Camp Gilwell. For years, the second floor was not used. The Seymour home was adapted to serve the Scouting camps help at Camp Gilwell. The house was converted to a large open area, as the walls and entire top floor were removed. The ghost story of Mrs. Seymour haunting the home has been re-told through the years.

=== Local Groups and Sections ===
Among Saskatchewan's varied Scouting groups are Scouts, Beavers, Cubs, Rovers, and the Saskatchewan Service Corps.

In 2005, Alberta's Chinook Council hosted a joint Alberta–Saskatchewan Brotherhood Jamboree at Camp Impeesa, celebrating the common centennial of the two provinces.

Canada has several associations which trace their roots to the Baden-Powell Scouts in the United Kingdom. They form the Canadian Federation of Independent Scouting, which is a member of the World Federation of Independent Scouts. Members of the federation include BPSA Saskatchewan.

=== Scout memorials ===
Scouting memorials include Seton Coulee, near Runnymede, named for Ernest Thompson Seton (51.5°N 101.7°W).

== Girl Guiding in Saskatchewan ==

Guide Companies were first registered in Saskatchewan in 1910, in Moose Jaw. Guides are now served by the Girl Guides of Canada – Saskatchewan Council. There is one provincially operated Girl Guide camp in Saskatchewan. Heritage Lake is in the northern half of the province. Girl Guides previously owned Camp Can-ta-ka-ye on Lake Diefenbaker, near Birsay, but it has been sold.

== See also ==
- Scouting in Montana
- Scouting in North Dakota
