= Scouting in North Dakota =

- A cub scout in North Dakota

Scouting in North Dakota has a long history, from the 1910s to the present day, serving thousands of youth in programs that suit the environment in which they live.

== Early history (1910–1950) ==
In 1922 the Devils Lake Council (#428) was founded, changing its name to the Lake Region District Council in 1923. The council folded in 1925.

In 1918 Minot Council (#431) was founded, changing its name to the Minot District Council in 1922. It changed its name again in 1929 to Great Plains Area Council.

In 1922 the Grand Forks Council (#430) was founded, changing its name to the Grand Forks County Council in 1924. It changed its name again in 1926 to Greater Grand Forks Area Council.

In 1920 the Red River Valley Council (#429) was founded. In 1920 the Fargo Council was founded. It merged into Red River Valley Council (#429) in 1925. In 1923 the Park Region Area Council (#294) was founded. It merged into Red River Valley Council (#429) in 1929.

In 1924 the Williston Council was founded. The council folded in 1925.

In 1927 the Bismarck Area Council (#432) was founded, changing its name to the Missouri Valley Council in 1929.

In 1926 the Greater Grand Forks Area Council (#430) was founded, changing its name to the Grand Forks Area Council in 1931. It changed its name again in 1929 to Lake Aggasiz Council in 1933.

== Recent history (1950–1990) ==
Boy Scouts of America (BSA) in North Dakota was organized into 4 councils from 1925 until 1974. The four Councils (and their headquarters) were:

- Red River Valley Council (#429) – Founded in 1925 and headquartered in Fargo; covering EC & SE ND and NW MN
- Lake Aggasiz Council (#430) – Founded in 1933 and headquartered in Grand Forks; covering NE ND and NW MN
- Missouri Valley Council (#432) – Founded in 1929 and headquartered in Bismarck; covering Bismarck/Mandan area
- Great Plains Area Council (#431) – Founded in 1929 and headquartered in Minot; covering Western ND and NE MT

In 1974 the four Councils merged into a single council, Northern Lights Council (#429).

== Scouting in North Dakota today ==
=== Northern Lights Council ===
Northern Lights Council
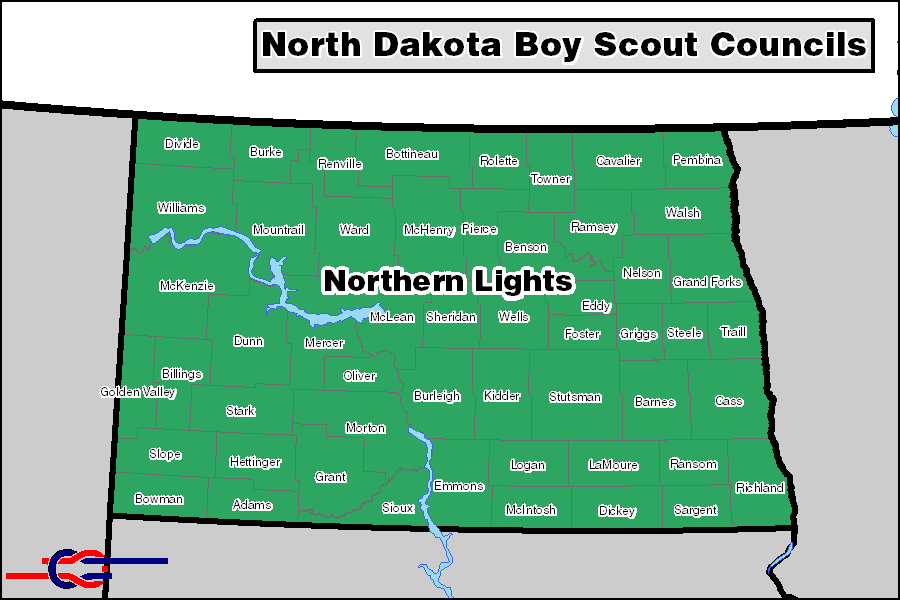
- Scouting in North Dakota

All of North Dakota is in the Northern Lights Council (NLC), formed in 1974 when several councils (Red River Valley Council – Fargo, Lake Agassiz Council – Grand Forks, Missouri Valley Council – Bismarck, and Great Plains Council – Minot) were merged into one.

As of 2006, Northern Lights Council serves all of North Dakota, and parts of South Dakota, northwestern Minnesota and northeast Montana.

== Girl Scouting in North Dakota ==
Girl Scouts - Dakota Horizons
- Map of Girl Scouts - Dakota Horizons
- Website www.gsdakotahorizons.org

There are two Girl Scout district offices in North Dakota in Fargo and Bismarck and two field offices in Minot and Grand Forks.

Camps

Girl Scout camps in North Dakota are:

- Camp Owettii, Minot, ND
- Camp Sakakawea, Pick City, ND
- Camp Ocankasa, Mandan, ND
- Camp Tonweya, Valley City, ND

== See also ==
- Scouting in Manitoba
- Scouting in Saskatchewan
