= Norwegian-American Genealogical Center & Naeseth Library =

Genealogy research center

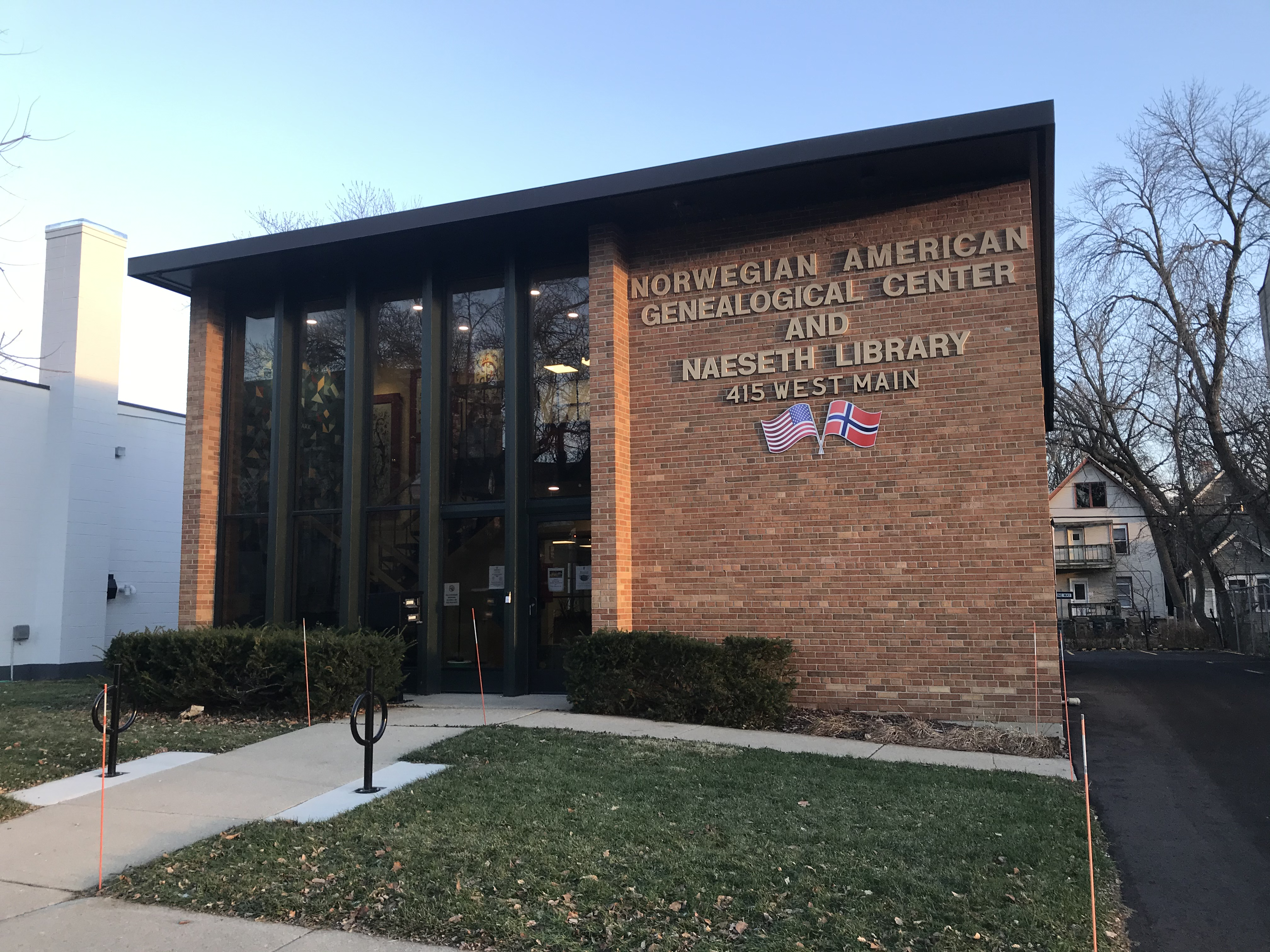
- Location: 415 West Main Street, Madison, Wisconsin
- Coordinates: 43.070001°N 89.388108°W
- Type: Library
- Website: nagcnl.org

The Norwegian-American Genealogical Center & Naeseth Library (NACGNL) is a not-for-profit Norwegian genealogy research center and library located at 415 West Main Street, Madison, Wisconsin. Through membership and service fees, it is accessible to both amateur and expert researchers. The library includes collections of Norwegian parish records, census records, government records, bygdebøker (a Norwegian language local history book), and family histories. The library holds American records, such as obituary records, immigration, and government records, and church records from the American Lutheran Church. An online access to some records is available to members.

== History ==
The Norwegian-American Genealogical Center was founded by Gerhard Brandt Naeseth (1913–1994), a Norwegian-American scholar in genealogy and immigration research. The organization was originally associated with the Vesterheim museum in Decorah, Iowa from 1974 to 2006. Much of Naeseth's work was published in "Norwegian Immigrants to the United States: A Biographical Directory, 1825–1850", and was continued by the work of the staff of the NACGNL in the 1990s. In 1992, the organization moved to its current location in Madison and since 2007 has operated independently from Vesterheim.
