= R. G. Ferguson =

Canadian physician (1883–1964)

Dr. R.G. Ferguson
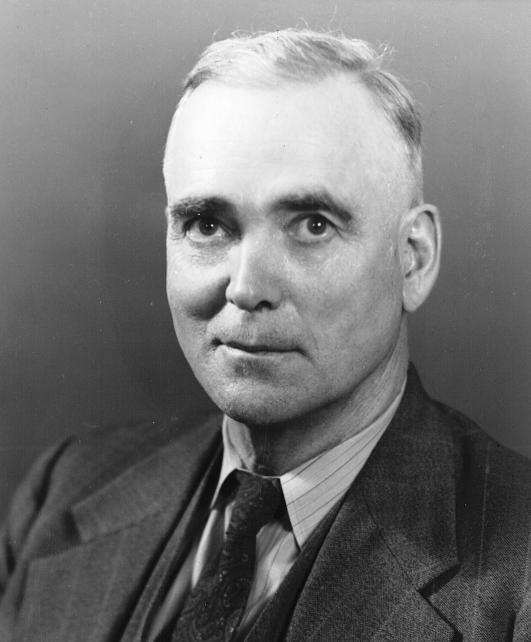
- Born: 12 September 1883; Joliette, North Dakota
- Died: 1964 (aged 80–81)
- Education: Wesley College, Manitoba Medical College

Robert George Ferguson, OBE, (12 September 1883 – 1964) was a pioneer in North America's fight against tuberculosis who worked for the introduction of free medical treatment.

As Medical Director, and later as General Superintendent of the Saskatchewan Anti-Tuberculosis League Canada, he achieved many firsts for the province, including

- 1921, provincial survey of school children: 54% of non-Indigenous children and 92.5% of Indigenous children had positive reactions to tuberculin tests indicating infection or exposure
- 1929, First province in Canada to provide free treatment of tuberculosis.
- First province to initiate a vaccination program for its sanatorium personnel (student nurses, 1938) and the First Nations population (infants, 1930).
- 1941–1947, First province to conduct province-wide tuberculosis surveys

Furthermore, Ferguson was a pioneer in long-term BCG vaccine research, quite controversial at the time.

== Biography ==
Robert George Ferguson was born on 12 September 1883 to Robert Ferguson and Margaret Jane Fisher. The couple had moved from Kincardine township in Ontario, Canada to North Dakota, USA in 1881, in part due to concerns about Margaret's health. Her family had a history of tuberculosis. At the time of R.G.'s birth, the family lived on a farm near Joliette, North Dakota.

In 1902, Robert sent George to Canada to look for a possible land purchase. After traveling to Winnipeg, Calgary and Edmonton, George recommended the purchase of already cultivated land near downtown Yorkton, a town by a railway line. On his recommendation, Robert purchased three quarter sections of land (the east half of section 27, and the northeast quarter of section 22, township 25, range 4) on July 21, 1902. The following summer, in 1903, the family moved to the homestead near Yorkton, Saskatchewan, Canada.

George's education was intermittent, with some periods of winter schooling interspersed with farm work, farm management and homesteading. He passed his grade 8 exams at age 15, after 3 years of absence. In 1904, at age 20, he began attending Wesley College in Winnipeg, with the goal of high school matriculation (grades 9–12). Following his father's death in 1906, he returned to school to complete his course of studies.

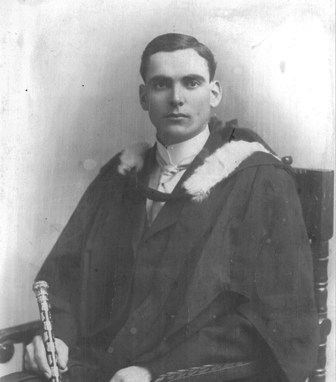
Dr. R.G. Ferguson, 1916, "Senior Stick", University of Manitoba

At first Ferguson planned a career in the Church. He carried out mission field work in Alberta in 1908 and 1912. He earned a Bachelor of Arts degree in 1910, with a Bronze Medal in Arts, and was selected Senior Stick by classmates. However, his voice was not considered strong enough to support preaching, and in 1912, he enrolled in the Manitoba College of Medicine. In 1915, while still a student, he briefly took over the administration of the Manitoba Tuberculosis Sanatorium in Ninette, Manitoba for David Alexander Stewart. In his final year of medical school Ferguson worked part-time in the laboratory of S. J. S. Pierce, making typhoid vaccine for the Canadian Expeditionary Force (CEF). In 1916 Ferguson graduated second in his class in medicine, earning another Bronze Medal. Ferguson's post-graduate work included training at the London Hospital in England, and at Harvard School of Medicine, Harvard University.

His two youngest brothers, Vernon Stewart and Frank Willard had by then enrolled at the same University and subsequently left school to join the CEF. Vernon joined in 1915 and was wounded 12 Oct. 1915 at Ypres as a member of the Princess Patricia's Canadian Highland Light Infantry. He was discharged December 14 1915, received the Mons Star, contracted tuberculosis and died in 1930.<https://ssns.frontiersd.mb.ca/SeniorYrs/Curricula9-12/Grade11/CanadianHistory/RemembranceDay/Soldiers/UnivCo/Ferguson.html> His youngest brother Frank was discharged from the CEF and joined No. 87 Squadron RAF. Frank flew a Sopwith Dolphin and was shot down by Bavarian Ace, Michael Hutterer, near the German-Canadian lines (Marcoyne) on the evening of September 3, 1918. Hutterer was a member of Jagdstaffel 23. Second Lt. Frank Ferguson is buried at Arras Road Cemetery near Roclincourt, France.

RG Ferguson and wife Helen with Margaret, Robert, Sheelagh, David, Patricia, and Helen ("Honey") outside the family cottage at Echo Lake in the Qu`Àppelle Valley, July 1940.

Ferguson married Helen Ross of Wynyard, Saskatchewan on July 5, 1916, after a four-year engagement. They had seven children: Robert Ross, Helen (Hart), Margaret (Love, later Fallis), Patricia (Motherwell, later Dyck), Sheelagh (Barrable), John Vincent, and David. John Vincent (Jackie), twin of Sheelagh, died in infancy, on December 9, 1925.

In 1929 RG Ferguson wrote, The Wood Fairies' Christmas Deed for his 6 surviving children. In 2014 this story was published, made available via Amazon with proceeds donated to the Lung Association of Saskatchewan. A short animated feature of the story was filmed and uploaded to YouTube. Ferguson's wife Helen was also an accomplished artist which is detailed in her biography, Her Legacy: The Life and Art of Helen FJ Ross Ferguson (Amazon).

RG Ferguson's children Robert Ross Ferguson, Sheelagh and David served in the Royal Canadian Air Force during the second world war. His son in law, Major John Vernon (Jack) Love of Yorkton, Saskatchewan, was killed leading D company of the Regina Rifles Regiment onto Juno Beach at Normandy France, June 6, 1944 (D-Day). Jack Love is buried in Bény-sur-Mer Canadian War Cemetery. His granddaughter, Sheelagh Cooper (nee Barrable), an entrepreneur and social activist, also received the Order of the British Empire (OBE) in King Charles III first New years Honours list in 2023. https://tnnbda.com/his-majesty-the-kings-new-years-honours-list-2023/

=== Medical career ===
Following graduation Ferguson worked under A. B. Alexander in the Acute Infection Hospital and others in Winnipeg as Assistant Medical Superintendent, replacing Alvin Trotter Mathers. In June 1917, he was hired by Maurice Macdonald Seymour to become the acting medical superintendent of the new Fort Qu'Appelle Sanatorium, which was opened on October 10, 1917. Conditions during the war had fostered both the spread of tuberculosis among soldiers and its detection. In response, the federal government provided new funding towards the completion of the sanatorium and the treatment of returning soldiers. Ferguson initially expected to be replaced within a few months by Lieutenant-Colonel William Malloch Hart, who had done much of the initial organization of the sanatorium before enlisting in the Canadian Army Medical Corps. Hart, however, submitted an official letter of resignation in November 1919, opening the way for Ferguson to become the permanent medical superintendent.

Ferguson remained at "Fort San" for 31 years. He was a skilled administrator with a knowledge of economics and the ability to analyze the dire challenge presented by rampant tuberculosis infection in the community. In 1917 the Province of Saskatchewan had the nation's highest incidence of tuberculosis with an annual death rate of 400 cases for a population of 700,000 people (57 deaths per 100,000 people). Another 1000 people per year were estimated to "break down" with the disease, and far more were infected and became contagious, often before realizing that they were ill. Native populations were (and continue to be) particularly affected, as was documented by Peter Bryce as early as the 1900s, and again by Ferguson himself.

Ferguson saw quickly that the only way to break the recurrent cycle of exposure, illness and death was to provide diagnosis, treatment and hospitalization at no cost to the patient. This was a huge political challenge. Ferguson persisted in his efforts, working patiently to gain support from people with tuberculosis, the public, members of the medical profession, and, last but not least, politicians, throughout his career. Ferguson recognized that education was an essential step: he saw the need to develop broad public understanding of tuberculosis disease transmission and support for measures to reduce it.

As one of three members appointed by the Provincial Government to form the Saskatchewan Anti-Tuberculosis Commission in 1921 he wrote the entire report. Nineteen of the report's 22 recommendations were implemented. Chief among them was making the cost of diagnosis and treatment of tuberculosis a public responsibility. Upon Ferguson's death in 1964 then Saskatchewan Minister of Health Minister Allan Blakeney said, "The introduction of diagnosis and treatment of tuberculosis at public expense was one of the early and essential steps in developing a program of health services for all."

Ferguson painstakingly reviewed the available records relating to illness among First Nations peoples in the Fort Qu'Appelle and File Hill areas and identified a series of epidemics related to increasing contact with the incoming white population. These included pertussis (1887), measles (1890, 1898) and influenza (1890, 1918–1919) in addition to tuberculosis. He actively investigated changes in resistance and related factors as possible explanations for the lack of resistance to disease displayed by First Nations populations. The patterns he saw in his data suggested that resettlement in houses and on reserves was followed by an epidemic rise in tuberculosis cases affecting the entire native population. Deaths peaked in 1886 with 9,000 deaths per 100,000 people, and then dropped, to 3,000 (1895), 2,000 (1901) and 1,000 (1907) deaths per 100,000 people. This suggested the arrival of a disease in a susceptible population, followed by decreasing rates as more resistant individuals survived. Ferguson did not hesitate to relate such illness in First Nations people to the widespread physical, economic and social changes that were impacting them. In October 1928 Ferguson gave a landmark presentation entitled "Tuberculosis Among the Indians of the Great Canadian Plains" at the 14th Annual Conference of the National Association for the Prevention of Tuberculosis at British Medical House, London. It established him as an international authority on tuberculosis. Later on the same trip he attended the Council of the International Union Against TB where the double barred cross of Lorena was adopted as a symbol of the worldwide fight against tuberculosis.

A further achievement in 1928 was integration of the native population into the sanatorium. Saskatchewan, under Ferguson's guidance, was the first province by eight years to fully integrate the native population into sanatoria. Previously they were segregated.

Ferguson found an ally in incoming Premier James G. Gardiner, and on 1 January 1929 the Saskatchewan Sanatoria & Hospitals Act was passed. Saskatchewan became the first province in Canada to make tuberculosis treatment free to all who needed it. As of 1930, Ferguson became director of medical services and general superintendent for all three of the Saskatchewan sanatoria (Fort Qu'Appelle, opened in 1917; Saskatoon, 1925; Prince Albert, 1930). T. W. Hamilton took over the post of medical superintendent at Fort San from 1930–1946.

=== BCG Research ===
At the time Ferguson began his career at Fort Qu'Appelle, BCG vaccination was controversial. The idea of introducing live tubercle into the human body was considered dubious from perspectives of both health and morality. This grew to a fever pitch in 1930 when 249 infants in Lübeck, Germany were vaccinated with a vaccine which was supposedly BCG but which turned out to be contaminated with virulent tubercle bacillus. Seventy one infants died of tuberculosis as a result. Ferguson initially expressed concern over the proposal to test the BCG vaccine, writing in a private letter to the President of the National Research Council, on 3 January 1931:

"I feel it would be unwise to initiate human experimental work among Indian children who are direct wards of the Government, and for which reason they are not in a position to exercise voluntary cooperation. Furthermore in case of difficulties arising the Government itself, could not be without responsibility."

Nonetheless, the reality in 1926 was that Indigenous people were ten times more likely than non-indigenous to die from tuberculosis. Ferguson's testing of indigenous students at File Hills and Qu'Appelle showed that 92% of the students tested positive for exposure to tuberculosis, compared to 54% of students in the non-indigenous population. Ferguson achieved substantial decreases in tuberculosis-related deaths through the work of visiting nurses, the isolation and hospitalization of active tuberculosis cases, and measures to improve living conditions, housing, water, and diet. Vaccination offered the hope of improving the odds even more for the most-at-risk patients, infants. By 1932, Ferguson felt that a test of BCG vaccine was justified. He was so convinced of the value of BCG vaccination that to prove its safety he vaccinated his own children before vaccinating anyone else.

In 1932 Ferguson received approval to begin BCG vaccination of newborn infants in the Fort Qu'Appelle Health Unit, and an increase in his annual National Research Council (NRC) grant for BCG research which, remarkably, was renewed for 21 consecutive years. Ferguson collaborated on this work with Austin Simes, a former classmate who became medical superintendent of the Qu'Appelle Indian Health Unit in 1929. Over a 12-year period Ferguson and Simes vaccinated over 600 First Nation newborns in a semi-randomized manner with followup throughout the period of the study. Families were paired in terms of socio-economic factors such as housing and sanitation to ensure that the vaccinated and unvaccinated groups were as comparable as possible.

Although their assignment of infants to trials might not meet a modern standard of "randomization", the Panel on Tuberculosis of the NRC Associate Committee on Medical Research in 1949 recognized Ferguson's and Simes's study as "the most scientific trial of BCG yet made". BCG vaccination was found to be highly protective, with a vaccine efficacy of 67%. Ferguson and Simes' work continues to be cited as a well-designed and rigorous study of the effectiveness of BCG vaccine against pulmonary and pleural TB.

Ferguson also took steps to document and address the issue of illness among nurses. Nurses working with tuberculor patients were at extremely high risk for contracting the disease. By using BCG vaccine to vaccinate student nurses, he was able to reduce the incidence of tuberculosis among student nurses from 5% to less than 1%.

Ferguson's "elegant studies" suggested that immunity took time to fully mature: as much as 18 months after an initial exposure. During that time, each successive exposure contributed to the cumulative risk for infection, one reason why it was so important to segregate active cases from those who were not yet ill.

=== Socio-economic conditions ===
With their National Research Council funding, Ferguson and Simes were able to carry out a long-term study of families of equal status with respect to living, social and economic conditions likely to impact health outcomes. This enabled them to examine both the impact of BCG vaccination, and the role of socio-economic factors. Ferguson's work in the 1930s and 1940s demonstrated, for the first time, that due to the number of deaths among vaccinated infants which were not related to tuberculosis, "poverty, not tuberculosis, was the greatest threat to Native infants." Further, based on his research, Ferguson recognized that

The obvious conditions facilitating the progress of the epidemic and the spread of infection at this time were the concentration of the Indians in fixed residences on the reserves, lack of sanitation, their contact with the surrounding white settlers, and the concentration of the children in boarding schools for education. Under these conditions tuberculosis infection spread quickly.

Ferguson considered Indian Residential schools to be a battleground in the fight against tuberculosis. From 1933–37 he sent out the travelling clinic of the Saskatchewan Anti-Tuberculosis League to residential schools throughout Saskatchewan to examine Native children, documenting conditions in the schools. Ferguson also advocated for the conversion of selected Residential schools into tuberculosis sanitoria, so that the sick children could be separated from the healthy to decrease the extremely high infection rates in the schools. In 1937 the Ministry of Indian Affairs introduced drastic funding cuts to medical care, explicitly targeting both tuberculosis funding and the provision of hospital care and drug treatments to Native people. Ferguson sent an angry letter to the Minister, Harold Wigmore McGill, protesting the cuts and warning the Government that some of the worst conditions were to be found in Duck Lake, Saskatchewan in Prime Minister William Lyon Mackenzie King's own riding of Prince Albert. Funding was restored and increased in subsequent years, but the request to convert a residential school into a tuberculosis hospital was ignored, leaving students with active tuberculosis in residential schools as wards of the government.

=== Photoradiography ===
Beginning in the 1920s, Ferguson worked with photographer Robert S. Connell and his brother James. The brothers developed methods to photograph radiographic images, and travelled to communities and schools with a portable generator and x-ray machine to screen people for tuberculosis. This included flying to remote areas such as Lac la Ronge and Beauval. By the 1940s, radiography was being used as a standard technique for detecting both tubercular and cancer cases when new patients entered hospital. Mass x-ray surveys were carried out at the community level in Melville in 1941 and provincewide by August 1947.

Ferguson retired in September 1948, at age 65, and was succeeded by John Orr as director of medical services for all three sanatoria. Ferguson spent the next few years writing Studies in Tuberculosis (1955). The 1940s and 1950s brought the discovery of newly-developed antibiotics. The combination of the tactics of detection, isolation and treatment that Ferguson had advocated with powerful new drugs began to empty the sanatoria. The Prince Albert San ceased to treat tuberculosis patients in 1961; Fort San in 1972; and the Saskatoon San in 1978.

=== Legacy ===
Statistics alone provide evidence of R.G. Ferguson's lasting impact on the fight against tuberculosis. In 1917 the Province of Saskatchewan recorded a rate of incidence of 50 per 100,000 of population. The death rate for Saskatchewan's First Nations infants in their first year was even more appalling: in 1936 it was still 1,603 per 100,000. By 1948, the year Ferguson retired, the death rate was down to 17 per 100,000. These impressive numbers are the result of Ferguson's two-pronged attack. First, he established access to free diagnosis and treatment, and second, he established BCG as a safe and effective vaccination.

Statistics alone, however, do not measure Ferguson's full influence on public health policy. He charted a course that would not only guide the direction of treatment of tuberculosis, but that would inspire health coverage plans across the country for generations. In 1935, one of his contemporaries Norman Bethune, who himself had contracted tuberculosis, attempted unsuccessfully to organize a Montreal Group and extend this concept and introduce a free health care system across Canada.

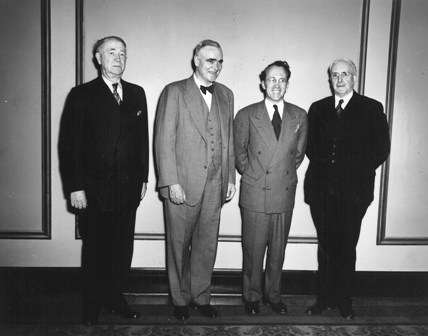
Dr. R.G. Ferguson, Sept 1948, Dr. JM Uhrich, Dr. RG Ferguson, Premier TC Douglas, Dr. F. Munroe, All Ministers of Health during Dr. Ferguson's career.

On his retirement in 1948, the person voted through the English language branch of the Canadian Broadcasting Corporation to be "the Greatest Canadian", T.C. Tommy Douglas, who had been both Premier and Minister of Public Health from 1944–48, said of Ferguson:

"Not before in the history of this province has there been such a universal expression of regard for one man. Few men have the opportunity in their lifetime to give such service as Dr Ferguson has to his generation and to his age. Still fewer would be so successful in rising to the opportunity."

Paradoxically, Ferguson's legacy was articulated as early as 1917 in his speech on the opening of the Fort Qu'Appelle Sanitorium:

"When we think of the future of this institution we do not think of its building and equipment, but rather of an idea, a force, a group of associations and a locality with its hopeful traditions, glowing with prestige and confidence in the cure of the disease. We would like to think of it as a medical centre, where is available every facility for the diagnosis and treatment of tuberculosis, where a sick man may get every chance to regain his broken health and return to a sphere of usefulness as a citizen. We want it to be an educational centre where the facts about a disease are being accumulated for public use; a centre where sufferers may come to get an education in regard to a disease, may learn its cure and prevention. Last of all, we want it to have the atmosphere of a home where those who have fallen ill with the disease may come to rest and receive the encouragement and direction necessary to win a hard fight."

Ferguson accomplished the goals he set out to achieve as laid out in this statement.

== Organizations ==
- President, Saskatchewan Medical Association, 1922
- President, Canadian Tuberculosis Association, (now the Canadian Lung Association) 1935-1936
- Fellow, American College of Chest Physicians
- American Trudeau Society, 1945–1957
- President, Saskatchewan Hospital Association
- Member, World Health Organization, Expert Committee on Tuberculin and BCG, 1948
- Member, World Health Organization, Expert Committee on Tuberculosis, 1949

== Awards and honours ==
In recognition of his achievements in the fight against tuberculosis, Ferguson received many awards and honours, including:

- The Order of the British Empire (Civil), 1935, as "George Ferguson", "For services in connection with the prevention and treatment of tuberculosis in the Dominion of Canada."
- The King's Medallion (Silver Jubilee of King George V, 1935)
- The Charles Mickle Fellowship, (1961) awarded by the University of Toronto to the person judged by the University to have done the most to advance medical art or medicine over the previous 10 years
- Honorary Doctor of Laws, University of Saskatchewan (1946)
- Honorary Life Memberships in the:
  - Brazilian Tuberculosis Association
  - Canadian Medical Association (1953)
  - Canadian Public Health Association
  - Canadian Tuberculosis Association (1952)
  - Royal Canadian Legion (1947)
  - Saskatchewan branch of the Canadian Public Health Association (1959)
  - Saskatchewan Medical Association (1948)

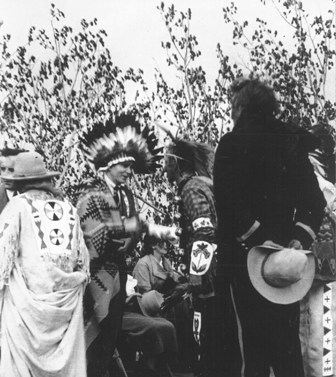
Dr. R.G. Ferguson, May 1935, Muskeke-O-Kemacan Ketche-na-na-ta we wayo, – "Great White Medicine Man"

In 1935, Ferguson was named honorary chief of the three bands of the Qu'Appelle Valley (Muscowpetung, Piapot and Pasqua), and given the Cree name "Muskeke-O-Kemacan Ketche-na-na-ta we wayo" or "Great White Physician".

Dr. Ferguson and Dr. Boughton with a group of ex-service patients, waiting for the arrival of their Majesties King George VI and Queen Elizabeth in June, 1939.

On June 3, 1939, King George VI and Queen Elizabeth visited the Sanatorium at Saskatoon where they were met by Ferguson and Veterans of the First World War who had also survived tuberculosis. In 1944, the Governor General of Canada, Alexander Cambridge, 1st Earl of Athlone and his wife Princess Alice, Countess of Athlone were dinner guests of the Fergusons while visiting the San at Fort Qu'Appelle.

Further recognition of Ferguson's achievements came in the form of the establishment of the Dr. R.G. Ferguson Professorship (1973) at the University of Saskatchewan; the Dr. George Ferguson School (Prek to Grade 8) in Regina, Saskatchewan (1969), and Ferguson Island, Saskatchewan.

== Bibliography ==
- Ferguson, RG (1955). Studies in Tuberculosis. Toronto: University of Toronto Press.
- Ferguson, RG; Simes, AB (January 1949). "BCG vaccination of Indian infants in Saskatchewan". Tubercle. 30 (1): 5–11. doi:10.1016/s0041-3879(49)80055-9. PMID 18102809.
- Ferguson, RG; Simes, AB (31 December 1941). Vaccination of Indian children with BCG in Saskatchewan. Report to the Committee on Tuberculosis of the National Research Council. (unpublished).
- Ferguson, RG (1928). Tuberculosis among the Indians of the Great Canadian plains. London: Adlard and Son.
- Saskatchewan Anti-Tuberculosis Commission (1922). Report of the Saskatchewan Anti-Tuberculosis Commission (PDF). Regina, Sask.: J. W. Reid, King's Printer. OCLC 879286773.
- Ferguson, RG (2014). The Wood Fairies' Christmas Deed. Heyden & Son, Incorporated. ISBN 978-0-9940011-0-8.
