= Scouting and Guiding in Manitoba =

Scouting in Manitoba has a long history, from the 1900s to the present day, serving thousands of youth in programs that suit the environment in which they live.

== Scouts Canada ==

Manitoba is administered by the Manitoba Council of Scouts Canada.

=== Service Areas ===
Manitoba is divided into Service Areas, each with an Area Commissioner and (ideally) with a service team.

The current Service Areas are:

- Lakeland
- West Manitoba (West Man)
- Northern Manitoba (Nor Man)
- Pembina Trails
- North West Winnipeg
- Agassiz Basin
- East Winnipeg

Within each area are groups — made up of one or more sections (Beavers, Cubs, Scouts, Venturers, Rovers) a group will have at least a Group Commissioner and may also have a group administrator, secretary, treasurer, registrar and quartermaster. This structure follows the Scouts Canada Standard.

Council Service Center: Winnipeg

== Association des Scouts du Canada ==

French-speaking Scouts are directed by the Comptoir Scout Franco-Manitobains in Winnipeg.

== Girl Guides of Canada ==

Guide Companies were first registered in Manitoba in 1910, in Winnipeg.

=== Manitoba Girl Guides ===
Manitoba Girl Guides is divided into five areas:

- Cambrian
- Crocus West
- Grand Pines
- Lagimodiere
- Prairie Valley

Headquarters: Winnipeg
Website: https://www.girlguides.ca/WEB/MB/

Former Camps:

- Caddy Lake established in 1948
- Ponemah on Lake Winnipeg established in 1928.

== B-PSA Federation of Canada ==
Canada has several associations which trace their roots to the Baden-Powell Scouts' Association in the United Kingdom. They form the Canadian Federation of Independent Scouting, which is a member of the World Federation of Independent Scouts. Members of the federation include BPSA — Manitoba.

== Scout memorials ==
Scouting memorials include The Seton Centre in Carberry, Manitoba, for Ernest Thompson Seton; an historic plaque and Seton Woodland Park, on the Trans-Canada Highway (east of Carberry, Manitoba); as well as Seton Bridge, Spruce Woods Provincial Park, Manitoba.

== See also ==
Scouting and Guiding in Canada's provinces and territories
- Scouting in Minnesota
- Scouting in North Dakota
