= Herman Stern =

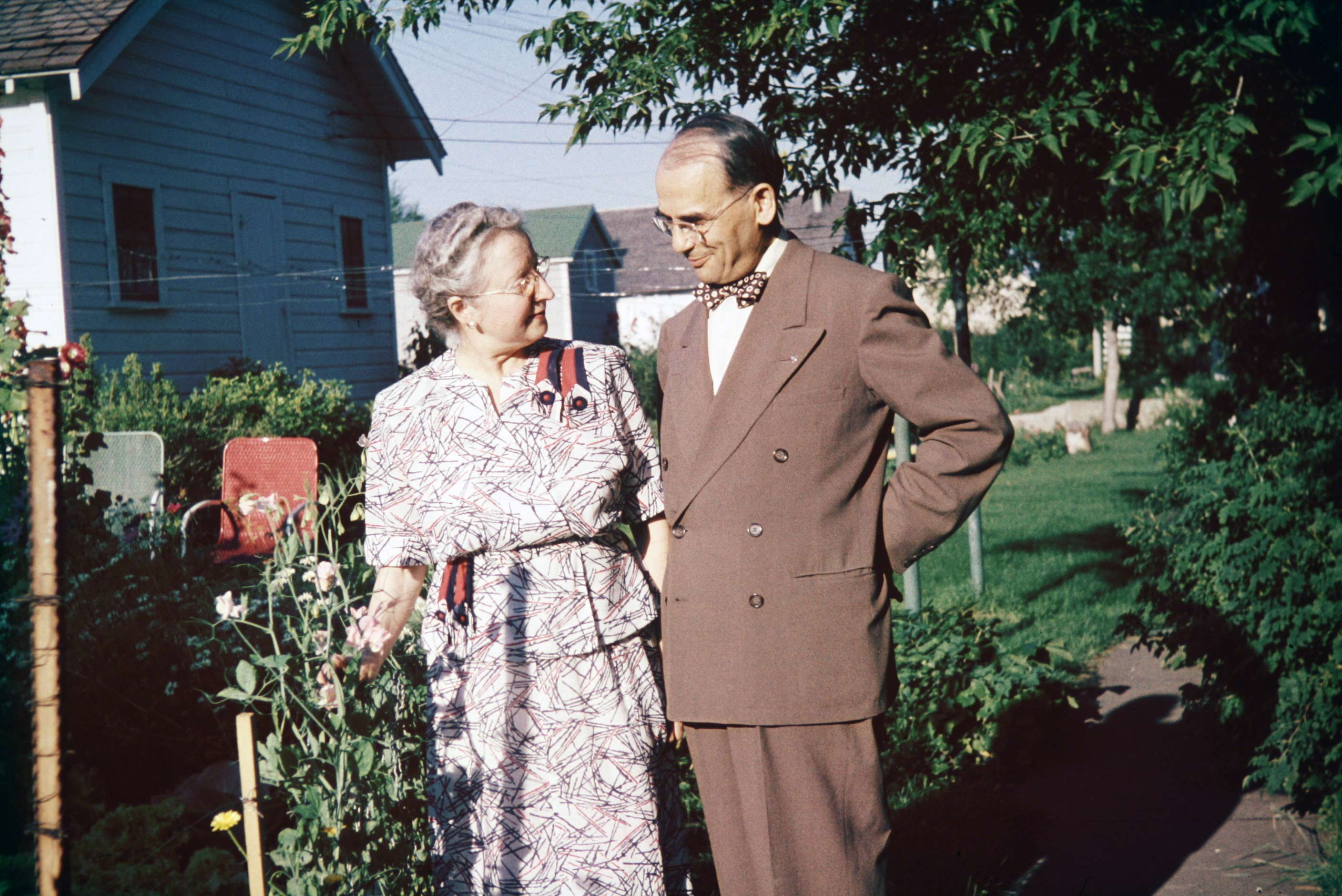
- Herman and Adeline Stern admiring their garden in Valley City, North Dakota (1955)
- Born: August 9, 1887; Oberbrechen, German Empire
- Died: June 20, 1980 (aged 92); Valley City, North Dakota, United States
- Occupation: Businessman
- Spouse: Adeline Roth
- Children: Richard Morris Stern, Edward Roth Stern

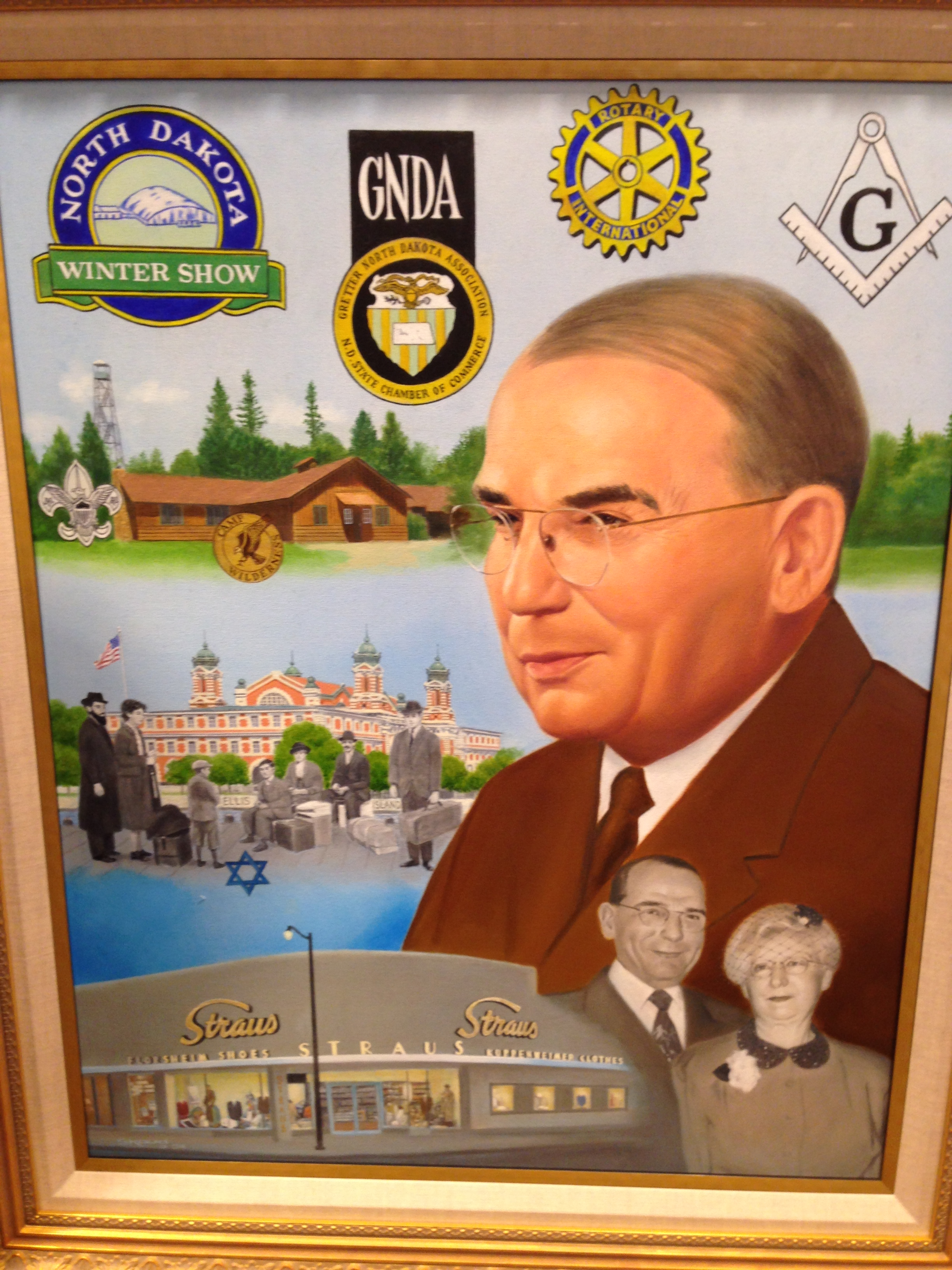
This painting was unveiled at the award ceremony posthumously honoring Herman Stern with the Theodore Roosevelt Rough Rider Award, the highest civic award in North Dakota. The painting celebrates his business and community leadership as well as his rescue of over 125 Jews from Nazi Germany. The painting hangs in the state capitol building in Bismarck, North Dakota.

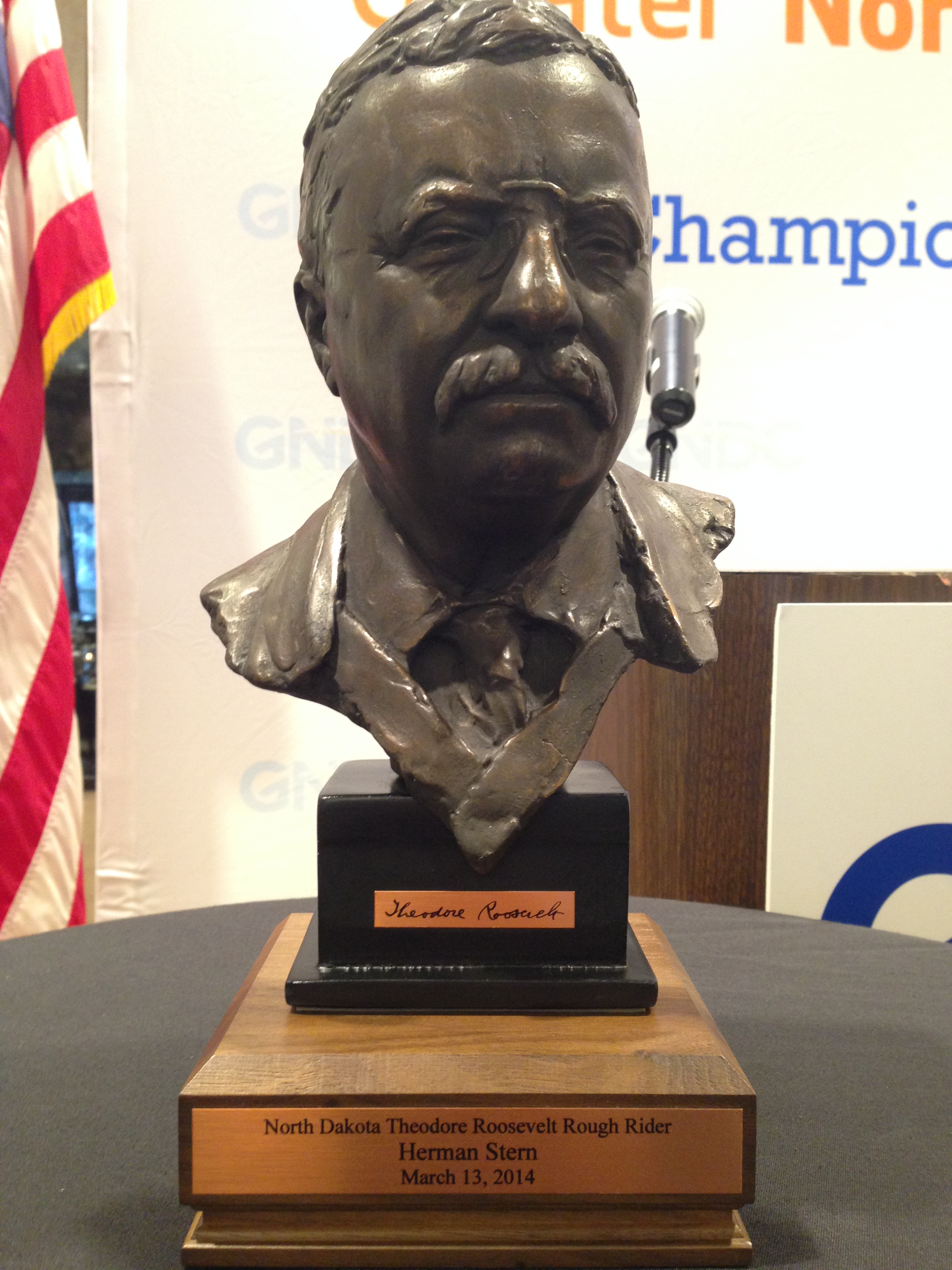
This bust was presented to the family of Herman Stern when he was posthumously awarded the Theodore Roosevelt Rough Rider Award in 2014.

Herman Stern (August 9, 1887 – June 20, 1980) was an American humanitarian, social and economic activist, businessman, visionary and director of the North Dakota Winter Show, and Holocaust rescuer.

== Early life ==
Born in Oberbrechen, Germany in 1887, Herman Stern immigrated to America in 1903, at the encouragement of his uncle Morris G. Straus, owner of the Straus Clothing store in Casselton, North Dakota. After Straus purchased the former Sternberg store in Valley City, North Dakota, in 1908, Stern moved to Valley City in 1910 to assist in the management of that store. In 1912, he married Adeline Roth, the much younger sister of Straus' wife (and cousin of Sternberg's daughter). One by one, other members of the Straus family left North Dakota, leaving Stern as owner and manager of Straus Clothing by 1920. He would live in Valley City for the remainder of his life.

== Holocaust rescuer ==
In the 1930s, with the aid of his wife Adeline and active cooperation from U.S. Senator Gerald Nye, Stern managed to save the lives of over 140 German Jewish refugees by sponsoring them for visas (including finding them jobs), and making arrangements to bring them to the United States. He said little in later life about rescuing so many men and women from inevitable death in the Holocaust, noting only "they did not owe me anything."

== Civic and fraternal organizations ==
Herman Stern was inducted into the Casselton Lodge No. 3 of Freemasonry in 1908. In 1913, Mr. Stern became a member of the Valley City Lodge, and was a member of the Ancient and Accepted Scottish Rite.

He was a member of Rotary International a service oriented organization.

He founded the Greater North Dakota Chamber, which promotes business development and North Dakota tourism, and developed the North Dakota Winter Show.

He founded an organization called the Community Chest. The organization is the predecessor to the current United Way of Barnes County.

He was also active with the Boy Scouts of America, and led efforts to establish councils in Fargo, Valley City, Wahpeton and Grand Forks, which later merged into the Northern Lights Council. In 1946, Stern started the fundraising campaign to build a regional camp for Scouting, today known as Camp Wilderness in Hubbard County, Minnesota.

== Honors and awards ==
In 1974, Herman Stern was awarded the Silver Buffalo Award, bestowed by the Boy Scouts of America in recognition of exceptional service to youth.

Camp Wilderness created an award named after Herman Stern, in recognition of his funding and creation efforts for the camp. The Herman Stern Honor Troop Award is given to troops at the end of each week of camp during the summer season. The award is given to Scouts BSA troops for camp participation, and adherence to the twelve points of the Scout Law.

For his many achievements and contributions to the state, Stern was posthumously inducted into the Theodore Roosevelt Rough Rider Award in 2014 by North Dakota Governor Jack Dalrymple.

== Documentary film ==
In 2017, Video Arts Studio of Fargo, North Dakota, produced The Mission of Herman Stern, a documentary film about Herman Stern's efforts to rescue 125 Jews from Nazi Germany in the 1930s and 1940s. The film was directed by Art Phillips and includes the stories of several people who were rescued by Herman. Congressman Earl Pomeroy discusses the role that Senator Gerald Nye played in helping Herman Stern secure visas. Historian Carl Oberholtzer describes life in the United States and Nazi Germany in the 1930s and 1940s. The filmmakers hope to have the film added to the school curriculum across North Dakota.
