= Valley City Times-Record =

American daily newspaper in North Dakota

- Type: Daily newspaper
- Owner: Horizon Publications
- Founder: H.W. Coe
- Publisher: Tina Olson
- Founded: 1879
- Language: English
- Headquarters: Valley City, North Dakota
- Website: times-online.com

The Valley City Times-Record is a daily (Monday to Friday) newspaper printed in Valley City, North Dakota and published by Horizon Publications. The newspaper had its beginnings as the Valley City Weekly Times. The Times-Record is the official newspaper of Barnes County, North Dakota and has a modest circulation in southeast North Dakota. Ellie Boese is the editor and Bill Parson is the publisher.

== History ==
In 1879, H.W. Coe published the first edition of the Northern Pacific Times in Valley City. His father Dr. S.B. Cole briefly took over as editor while his son went to college in Brooklyn. In October 1880, Dr. Coe sold the paper to Clement M. Greene so he could go practice medicine in Mandan. At that time it was officially renamed to the Valley City Times. After four months, Greene grew sick and sold the paper to G.B. Vallandigham, and soon died. In August 1881, Alexander McConnell assumed control.

In April 1887, the Times and the Record were consolidated under editor J. Jeff Debbin. In August 1889, a mob broke into the paper's printing plant, then owned by Herbert Root, and caused $3,000 worth of damage due to Root's opposition to a local whiskey ring. Frank M. Cornell became publisher in September 1889, followed by W.F. Dunlap in 1892, and Steve A. Nye in 1899.

In 1907, Frank E. Ployhar and Frank E. Packard, owners of the Weekly Alliance, acquired the Times-Record from Nye and merged the two papers. In 1909, Ployhar sold out to two others. A year later Packard announced the paper could cease. In 1911, Packard sold out to L.P. Hyde. In 1914, a fire partially destroyed the paper's plant, causing $5,000 worth of damage.

In 1915, C.E. Greenwood and Ben Houghtaling bought the Times-Record. Houghtaling soon left, and Greenwood sold it in 1918 to Percy R. Trubshaw. The Nonpartisan League soon started a rival paper called the Farmers' Opinion in an attempt to put Trubshaw out of business due to his criticism of their leader Arthur C. Townley. Trubshaw sold the Times-Record to E.D. Lum in 1925, and then reacquired it in 1927.

In March 1933, Gov. William Langer billed Trubshaw, who was associated with League rival Independent Voters Association, for allegedly stealing his hat during a hotel banquet. Trubshaw denied the theft, but paid anyway. Trubshaw published the paper until his death from Typhoid fever in August 1933. The Trubshaw family continued to publish the paper until 1944, when they sold it to a business group, who immediately resold it to Don C. Matchan, who merged it with his Barnes County News.

In April 1947, a group of local business men called the "committee of 40" opposing Matchan's left-wing editorial policies demanded he sell the paper in 30 days or else they would start a rival publication. In response, Matchan sent ballots to subscribers asking whether or not he should sell. Newspapers across the country wrote in support of Matchan and Freedom of the press in the U.S. Matchan received over 500 votes, who supported him 5-1. However, he was still undecided about selling as the deadline loomed, but he did place an ad in Editor & Publisher. As Matchan refused to make a decision, the committee moved forward with plans to start a rival paper. He eventually chose to wait and see what the financial impacts would be from his continued ownership.

In October 1947, Matchan sold the Times-Record to a company headed by Jerome O. Bjerke. Bjerke was elected president of the North Dakota Press Association in 1950, and sold his stock in the business in 1952, leaving Owen O. Scott as company head. Philip T. Mark became editor, but soon died. The paper was acquired by Edward C. Cochrane in 1962, Mid-America Publishing Corp. in 1964, and American Publishing Company in 1993. At some point the Times-Record was acquired by Horizon Publications, Inc. In 2011, the paper's publisher was fired. In response, editor Lee Morris published an op-ed disguised as a syndicated column criticizing the company. He quit soon afterwards.
