= Robert Ross Ferguson =

- David Lloyd Ferguson (left) and Robert Ross Ferguson (right) on the occasion of David's graduation from the pilot and air gunner training, September 1944
- Born: Robert Ross Ferguson; May 13, 1917; Winnipeg, Manitoba, Canada
- Died: September 19, 2006 (aged 89); Fort Qu'Appelle, Saskatchewan, Canada
- Education: University of Regina; University of Saskatchewan
- Spouse: Norma Johnson
- Children: 4
- Relatives: Dr. Robert George Ferguson (father)
- Military career
- Branch: Royal Canadian Air Force
- Conflicts: World War II
- Awards: Order of Canada

Robert Ross Ferguson "Bob" (May 13, 1917 – September 19, 2006) was a Royal Canadian Air Force pilot and public servant.

He graduated with a BA (University of Saskatchewan 1946), BSc (University of Regina 1949), CM, S.O.M., LL.D (Hon), University of Regina, exemplified the life of service. He expressed this commitment early in the 1995 film documentary My Father's Legacy: "I wanted to live my life in a manner in which my father would be proud."

== Early life and education ==
Robert Ross Ferguson was born on May 13, 1917, in Winnipeg, Manitoba to Dr. Robert George Ferguson and Helen Ferguson. Shortly after his birth, his parents relocated to Fort Qu'Appelle, Saskatchewan, where his father had been appointed General Superintendent and Medical Director of the newly established Saskatchewan Anti-Tuberculosis League.

This was a challenging period for the family, as Dr. Ferguson was treating his brother, Vernon, who had returned from service in Ypres, Belgium, with tuberculosis. Tragedy befell them when Dr. Ferguson's younger brother, Frank, who served in 87 Squadron Royal Flying Corps, was shot down by German Ace Michael Hutterer during a dogfight near the Canadian-German line in Marcoyne, France on September 3, 1918. Matters at home were not helped by the Spanish flu (also known as H1N1) that lingered as a result of the war, which caused George, Bob's brother, to fall ill and be isolated in the TB Sanatorium.

Bob Ferguson had aspirations of pursuing a career in medicine, similar to his father. Instead, he began studying agriculture at the University of Regina in 1937. His education was cut short by the outbreak of World War II.

== Career ==
=== Military service ===
Bob Ferguson's flight training took place over the winter of 1940–41. He was then assigned to the Royal Canadian Air Force No. 410 Squadron, "the Cougars", stationed at RAF Ayr to protect the coast of Scotland and England.

While with Squadron 410, Bob Ferguson met and became roommates with John Aiken, who later became the Chief Air Marshal of the Royal Air Force. Sir John would later describe him as "a natural leader, Bob Ferguson cared deeply for his squadron and it showed in the respect he showed his pilots and his initiative in improving skills. Indeed to me he personified the success of the British Commonwealth Air Training Plan." Ferguson was promoted rapidly, achieving the rank of Flying Officer in October 1942, Flight Lieutenant in January 1943, and Squadron Leader in January 1944.

Bob Ferguson quickly developed a reputation for innovative training and meticulous preparation with his squadron. He identified several weaknesses in the aerial gunnery courses which were all taught on Spitfires while most pilots flew other more heavily armoured aircraft. Hearing his criticism Wing Commander Archibald Winskill of RAF Winfield called on Ferguson to set up and develop a twin-engine gunnery course. He did, the course was very successful and soon pilots brought their own de Havilland Mosquito or Beaufighter planes with them for training from all over the United Kingdom. The students were interviewed continually to refine the course and further improve the training before the pilots were posted to aerial combat.

Ferguson flew the Mosquito fighter-bomber during war. When the Mosquito entered production in 1941, it was one of the fastest operational aircraft in the world. Entering widespread service in 1942, the Mosquito supported RAF strategic night fighter defence forces in the United Kingdom from Luftwaffe raids, most notably defeating the German aerial offensive Operation Steinbock in 1944. Offensively, the Mosquito units also conducted nighttime fighter sweeps in indirect and direct protection of RAF Bomber Command's heavy bombers to help reduce RAF bomber losses in 1944 and 1945.

Home on leave in September 1944, Bob was invited to "pin" the wings on his younger brother David at his graduation as a pilot and air gunner in the RCAF.

Bob Ferguson gave up flying after the war but maintained a keen interest in his beloved 410 Squadron, later led by his brother-in-law, Wing Commander Keith Fallis. Now responsible for ensuring the safety of Canada's domestic airspace, the squadron currently operates out of CFB Cold Lake, Alberta as the operational training squadron for Canada's McDonnell Douglas CF-18 Hornet fleet.

=== After the war ===
After the war, Ferguson returned to the University of Saskatchewan to complete his degree. He had begun farming before the war and resumed it when the war ended, at the same time finishing his Bachelor of Arts degree (1946) from the University of Saskatchewan and Bachelor of Science in Agriculture in 1949.

His 1946 graduation marked a memorable occasion: his father received an honorary Doctor of Laws degree at the same ceremony. "When I got my BA, he got his Honorary Doctor of Laws. And when I went across the stage to pick up my diploma, my father bowed graciously as I went by" he recalled in an interview with the University of Regina's alumni magazine in fall of 1999.

In the film 'My Father's Legacy', he recounts his father saying, "Now that you have received your degree you must remember that you have only paid for a small part of the cost of your education. What are you going do for your community, your province and your country to help repay the cost of the education for which they have paid for you." With characteristic understatement, he said, "When dad asked me what I was going to do it got me thinking." Despite his disappointment at not being able to follow in his father's footsteps by establishing a medical career, he found another vocation: farming.

Farming opened the door to extensive involvement in community service, particularly in support of Saskatchewan's two universities. As a University of Regina alumnus, he helped build the alumni association, serving on the board from its inception. In that capacity, he helped establish awards for excellence to honour professors' research and teaching and was the first chair of the scholarship committee. He saw scholarships as a way to give back to the institution and has established three at the University of Regina.

=== Public service ===
His public service after his career in the Royal Canadian Air Force included:

- Member, Board of the University of Saskatchewan
- Founding member, Board the University of Regina
- Chair, Alumni Fund, the University of Regina
- Reeve, Municipality of Qu'Appelle
- Chair, Saskatchewan Lung Association
- Member, Edgeley Cooperative Association Board
- Member, Egg Lake, Saskatchewan Conservation and Development Authority

== Recognition ==
Public recognition followed Bob Ferguson's community service:

- 1984 Honorary Doctor of Laws Degree (LL.D), the University of Regina
- 1986 "Distinguished Graduate in Agriculture" the University of Saskatchewan
- 1987 Order of Canada
- 1994 Saskatchewan Order of Merit
- 2005 Saskatchewan Centennial Medal

== Personal life ==
He was devoted to his wife Norma, giving her roses every week of their 59 years of marriage, until her death. In 1999 he told the U of R Alumni Magazine: "I've had a most exciting and interesting life. I look back on it and I just wouldn't have changed anything." He died on September 19, 2006, in Regina, Saskatchewan.

One of his last official acts was to sign the letters for the 2006 Christmas Seals Campaign for the Saskatchewan Lung Association. He said, "If the Lung Association has benefited from our association half as much as I have then it has been time well spent."
