= Gerhard Brandt Naeseth =

American historian

Gerhard Brandt Naeseth (April 14, 1913 – June 10, 1994) was an American librarian and genealogist who specialized in the field of Norwegian-American immigration.

== Background and career ==
Naeseth was born in Valley City, North Dakota, in 1913, the son of a Lutheran clergyman. As a young boy, he sought to follow in his father's footsteps, but an uncle recognized early on that Naeseth had more of the traits of a librarian. The uncle turned out to be right and Naeseth eventually received degrees in history and library science. Naeseth received a bachelor's degree from Luther College in Decorah, Iowa, and graduate degrees from the University of Michigan. He worked as a professional librarian for three universities before retiring from the University of Wisconsin–Madison in 1978, where he had been associate director.

Naeseth is most well known for his magnum opus, Norwegian Immigrants to the United States: A Biographical Directory. For this work, Naeseth was awarded the Knight's Cross, First Class, Royal Norwegian Order of St. Olav in 1978. The Norwegian American Genealogical Center & Naeseth Library in Madison, Wisconsin is named in his honor. Naeseth was also the director and chief researcher of the Vesterheim Genealogical Center, now the Norwegian American Genealogical Center & Naeseth Library, from 1974 to 1994. Naeseth served as associate director of the libraries of the University of Wisconsin–Madison from 1948 to 1978. He was also chairman of the Church Council of the American Lutheran Church.

Naeseth died during 1994 in Madison, Wisconsin. He was buried at the Spring Prairie Lutheran Cemetery in Keyeser, Wisconsin. After his death the research chair at Vesterheim Genealogical Center was named in his honor.

== Norwegian-American Genealogical Center & Naeseth Library ==
Naeseth's genealogical work began in the mid-1950s at a family reunion in Minnesota, when he agreed to write up the history of the Naeseth-Fehn family. He self-published this work in 1956. Thirty years later he reworked and expanded it into two volumes and printed 150 copies. This work had gotten him interested in the 150 people who came to America on the same ship as his family. Eventually his project expanded to include the 18,000 Norwegian immigrants who came to America prior to the 1850 census. Naeseth completed the first of this five volume history of Norwegian immigrants to the United States in 1993. Subsequent volumes have been completed by Blaine Hedberg, former executive director of the Norwegian American Genealogical Center & Naeseth Library.

Naeseth founded the Vesterheim Genealogical Center in 1974, working out of a temporary office at the University of Wisconsin library in Madison and slowly acquiring a vast collection of resources. By charging for genealogical research and selling annual memberships, Naeseth built the center into the hub of Norwegian genealogical research in America. By the early 1990s the center had its own building and a staff of professional researchers. Naeseth never accepted a salary while he built the center, living instead off his retirement income.

== Selected works ==
- Norwegian Settlements in the United States: A Review of Printed and Manuscript Sources for the Study of Norwegian Sources in America. Salt Lake City: Genealogical Society of Utah, 1969.
- Norwegian Immigrants to the United States: A Biographical Directory.
  - Vol. 1: 1825-1843. Decorah, Iowa: Anundsen Publishing Company, 1993.
  - Vol. 2: 1844-1846. Decorah, Iowa: Anundsen Publishing Company, 1997.
  - Vol. 3: 1847-1848. Decorah, Iowa: Anundsen Publishing Company, 2000.
  - Vol. 4: 1849. Decorah, Iowa: Anundsen Publishing Company, 2004.
  - Vol. 5: 1850. Decorah, Iowa: Anundsen Publishing Company, 2006.
