= Scouting in South Dakota =

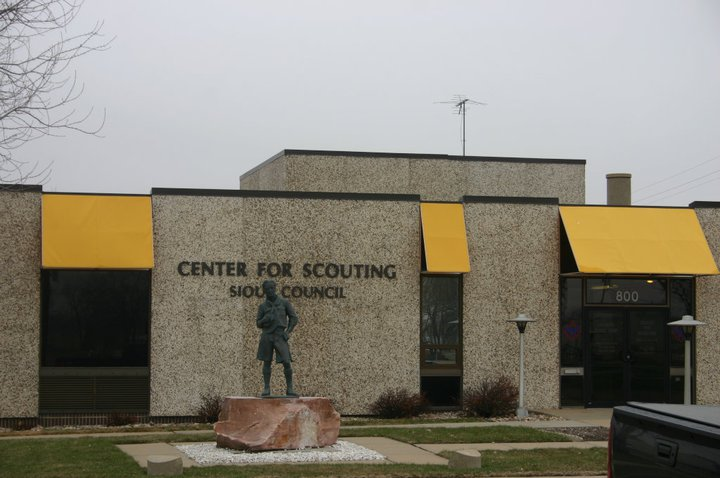
- Sioux Council Office

Scouting in South Dakota has a long history, from the 1910s to the present, and serves thousands of youth in programs that suit the environment in which they live.

== Early history (1910–1950) ==
In 1917 the Centerville Council was founded. It folded in 1918.

In 1917 the Mitchell Council was founded. It folded in 1920.

In 1920 the Yankton Council (#555) was founded. It folded in 1924.

In 1930 the Black Hills Area Council (#695) was founded.

In 1920 the Huron Council (#693) was founded. It reformed as the Huron Area Council in 1925, changing its name to the Central South Dakota Council in 1928. In 1942 it changed its name to Pheasant Council (#693).

In 1925 the Southern South Dakota Council (#716) was founded. In 1927 it merged into the Sioux Council.

In 1926 the Hiawatha Council (#733) was founded. In 1927 it merged into the Sioux Council.

In 1925 the Aberdeen Area Council (#703) was founded. In 1928 it changed its name to Northern South Dakota Council, changing the name again in 1931 to the Dasota Council. In 1933, the Dasota Council split, with half of the council going to Central South Dakota and half going to Arrowhead.

In 1934 the Arrowhead Council (#703) was founded. In 1942 the Pheasant Council (#693) was founded. In 1943 Arrowhead merged into Pheasant.

In 1927 the Sioux Council (#733) was founded.

== Recent history (1950–1990) ==
In 1978, the Pheasant Council (#693) merged into the Sioux Council (#733).

== Boy Scouts of America in South Dakota today ==
There are two Boy Scouts of America (BSA) local councils serving South Dakota. All of South Dakota lies within Central Region as part of Area C1A

=== Black Hills Area Council ===
Black Hills Area Council (#695)
- Owner: Boy Scouts of America
- Headquarters: Rapid City
- Country: United States
- Website

The Black Hills Area Council was granted a charter by the National Council, Boy Scouts of America in 1930. It serves (as of when?) over 3,700 youth members in Western South Dakota and Eastern Wyoming.

==== Organization ====
The Black Hills Area Council has one district, the Rushmore District.

==== Camps ====
In 1976 the Black Hills Area Council established Medicine Mountain Scout Ranch, its year-round camping facility which hosts both unit and family groups.

=== Mid America Council ===
The Mid-America Council offers programs in 58 counties in Nebraska, Iowa and South Dakota. The Mid-America Council was formed from a merger of the Covered Wagon Council and the Southwest Iowa Council in 1965. The first recorded Scouting in the area was in 1918 as the Omaha Council. In 2000 the council merged with the Prairie Gold Area Council in Sioux City, Iowa.

=== Northern Lights Council ===
The Northern Lights Council serves North Dakota, and counties in South Dakota, northwest Minnesota and northeast Montana.

=== Sioux Council ===
Sioux Council (#733)
- Owner: Boy Scouts of America
- Headquarters: Sioux Falls, SD
- Country: United States
- Website

Sioux Council serves Scouts in South Dakota, Iowa and Minnesota.

==== Organization ====
- Buffalo Ridge District
- Five Rivers District
- Lewis and Clark Trail District
- North Star District
- Pheasant District
- Prairie Hills District

==== Camps ====
Sioux Council operates the Lewis & Clark Scout Camp at Tabor, SD; and Camp Iyataka at Wilmot, SD.

==== Order of the Arrow ====
Tetonwana Lodge #105
- Founded: October 6, 1937
- Membership: 421
- Lodge Chief: Nathan Loutsch
- Website; Tetonwana Lodge

Tetonwana Lodge is the local lodge of the Order of the Arrow for Sioux Council. The Tetonwana Lodge was chartered in 1937 and serves Scouts in the states of South Dakota, Minnesota. and Iowa.

On January 1, 1978, Tetonwana Lodge #105 and Iyatonka Lodge #460 merged. This merger was the result of a merger between Sioux Council and Pheasant Council.

== Girl Scouting in South Dakota ==
Girl Scouting in South Dakota
- Map of Girl Scout Council in North Dakota, South Dakota, and part of Minnesota

Two Girl Scout Councils serve South Dakota.

=== Girl Scouts - Dakota Horizons ===
Girl Scouts - Dakota Horizons
- Website www.gsdakotahorizons.org

Girl Scouts - Dakota Horizons serves 11,000 girls and has 4,100 adult volunteers in North and South Dakota and in thirteen counties in northwestern Minnesota and Lyon County, Iowa. The council is divided into four geographic areas and has seven offices. Girl Scouts—Dakota Horizons is headquartered in Sioux Falls, South Dakota.

==== History ====
On July 1, 2007 the three Girl Scout councils of South Dakota and the three in North Dakota merged to form the current council. The councils it replaces are:

- Girl Scouts of The Black Hills Council;
- Girl Scouts of Minn-Ia-kota;
- Girl Scouts of Nyoda Council;
- Girl Scouts of Northwest North Dakota;
- Girl Scouts of Sakakawea Council; and
- Girl Scouts-Pine to Prairie Council.

==== District Offices ====
- Bismarck, North Dakota - Northwest District
- Fargo, North Dakota - Northeast District
- Rapid City, South Dakota - Southwest District
- Sioux Falls, South Dakota - Southeast District

District Field Offices:

- Minot, North Dakota
- Grand Forks, North Dakota

==== Camps ====
- Camp MOE - near Thief River Falls, Minnesota
- Camp Neche - near Bismarck, North Dakota
- Camp Ocankasa - near Mandan, North Dakota
- Camp Owetti - near Minot, ND
- Camp Sakakawea - near Pick City, North Dakota
- Camp Tonweya is north of Valley City, North Dakota
- Wall Lake Camp is near Sioux Falls, SD
- Camp Nyteepeota - on Lake Kampeska in Watertown, South Dakota
- Camp Arroya is near Mitchell, SD
- Camp Woodlands - near Huron, South Dakota
- Robin's Nest is near Aberdeen, SD
- TDAF (Tom and Danielle Aman Foundation) Lodge is near Aberdeen, SD
- Cedar Canyon Camp is near Rapid City, SD

Former Camps:

- Camp PahaSapa was near Rapid City, South Dakota

=== Girl Scouts of Greater Iowa ===
Serves South Dakota girls in Union and part of Clay counties.

== See also ==
- Scouting in North Dakota
