= North Dakota Winter Show =

Agriculture show in North Dakota, United States

Coordinates: 46°54′57″N 97°59′38″W

- Date: First week in March
- Location: Municipal Auditorium, Valley City, North Dakota
- Website: www.northdakotawintershow.com

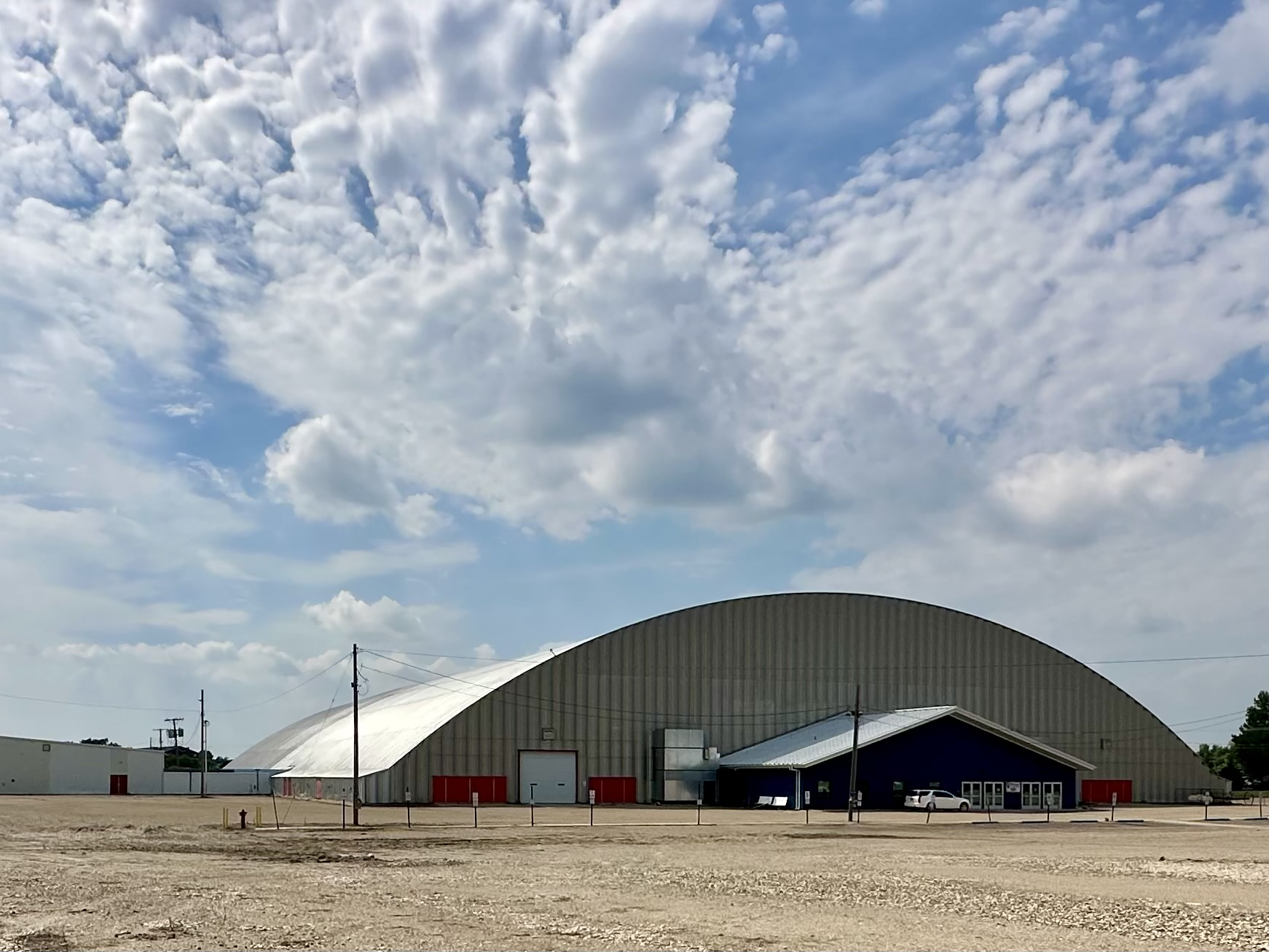
North Dakota Winter Show Building at Valley City, North Dakota

The North Dakota Winter Show is an agriculture and livestock show held in Valley City, North Dakota the first full week of every March. The Winter Show started in 1937 and now has an annual attendance of around 30,000 people.

North Dakota's oldest agriculture show, the show was founded under the guidance of Valley City businessman Herman Stern, who had previously been instrumental in the founding of the Greater North Dakota Association in 1924-25, and was serving as president of that group in 1937 when the state was facing adverse economic and agricultural circumstances. Another GNDA official, Bert Groom, proposed establishing the Winter Show to attract visitors and commerce, and the event was established. Stern later received North Dakota's highest citizen honor, the Rough Rider Award, in honor of this and other accomplishments. There was no show in 1942.

In 2004 the Winter Show's traditional ten-day schedule was compressed to six days while retaining the full schedule of activities.

Since 2021, strict measures are undertaken, such as wearing masks & social distancing.

== Events ==
- North Dakota Winter Show
- North Star Classic
- Concerts
- Livestock shows
- PRCA rodeo
- State crop show
- 4-H and FFA livestock judging
- 4-H and FFA crop judging
- Special events
- Livestock sales
