= Maurice Macdonald Seymour =

Physician and surgeon from Canada

- Born: June 7, 1857; Goderich, Canada West
- Died: January 6, 1929 (aged 71); Regina, Saskatchewan
- Occupations: Physician, Surgeon
- Spouse: Helena Louise La Rue
- Children: 5

Maurice Macdonald Seymour (July 7, 1857 – January 6, 1929), Commissioner of Public Health, was a physician and surgeon of the early North-West Territories in Canada.^{[B]} He founded the Saskatchewan Anti-Tuberculosis League which incorporated and constructed the Fort Qu'Appelle sanitarium. Seymour established the Saskatchewan Medical Association in 1906.

== Biography ==
=== Early life and education ===
Seymour was born July 7, 1857, in Goderich, Canada West, to Captain Maurice Bain Seymour and Maria Macdonald. Captain Seymour was born in Ireland and his wife Maria Macdonald in Scotland. Maurice Seymour and Maria had three children.

Seymour began his secondary education be studying at the Assumption College in Sandwich, Ontario, from which he graduated in 1873.^{[C]} In 1876 he served with Prince of Wales Rifles during the Guibord Riots in Montreal. Seymour attended McGill University, Montreal, Quebec, graduating 1879 with a Doctor in Medicine and Master in Surgery. He continued his education at the Toronto University where he received the degree D.P.-H.

=== Marriage and children ===
In 1880, he wedded Helena Louise La Rue, at Aylmer, Quebec. Together, Helena and Seymour had five children, three sons and two daughters. His sons moved to California. His sons name were Arthur Seymour, Harold C. Seymour and Maurice L. Seymour. He had an adopted son named Bernard Seymour and one stillborn son. Ena Isabella Seymour married Major M. A. Burbank who served in the First World War. Cora Muriel Seymour married Frank Dean. Mrs. Seymour died and the Doctor remarried. Seymour married his Nurse Ann Helena Fallon. Helena Seymour passed in 1925 and he remarried Ann Helena Fallon October 5, 1927. Seymour is buried in California. Helena Seymour's maiden name was La Rue. Her father came comes from Quebec and the Gatineau/Aylmer district area.

== Heritage ==
While practicing medicine in Fort Qu'Appelle, Seymour lived in a large yellow house presently located south of Saskatchewan Highway 56 near the communities of Lebret, and Mission Lake in southern Saskatchewan. The home was later donated to Scouts Canada and served as a kitchen and meeting area in Camp Gilwell.

=== Physician and surgeon ===
Seymour was employed in Montreal for the West End Dispensary as a surgeon as well as for the Board of Health as the district surgeon. He held a position as Chief Surgeon for the Manitoba South-Western Railway. In 1881, he moved to Winnipeg and continued in general practice.^{[B]} He was a railway surgeon for the Canadian Pacific Railway crews as they finished construction through the mountains on the Transcontinental Railway. Between 1885 and 1905, he served with the North-West Territories Medical Council. He served as both president and vice-president of the Medical Council of the North-West Territories During the North-West Rebellion. in 1885, Seymour assisted the 95th Battalion, Manitoba Grenadiers as surgeon.

Seymour settled at Fort Qu'Appelle and practiced medicine until 1904. In 1904 he moved to Regina, the capital city.

Seymour became the provincial Commissioner of Public Health. When the province of Saskatchewan formed in 1905, he was placed in charge of the province's health. The health department began within the Department of Agriculture. In 1906 the Saskatchewan Medical Association was organised under his leadership. He has also been president of the Canadian Public Health Association and vice president of the American Health Association. He founded the Saskatchewan Anti-Tuberculosis League which incorporated and constructed the Fort Qu'Appelle sanitarium. He then hired Dr. R.G. Ferguson as the physician and director at the sanitorium.

He set up educational campaigns promoting hygiene. He established free clinics and dispensaries for the treatment of venereal disease. The "Seymour Plan" enabled residents to receive diphtheria immunizations in September and October, smallpox immunizations during November and December, and typhoid immunizations in January and February.

=== Death and afterward ===
Seymour died January 6, 1929, in Regina, Saskatchewan.

== Philosophical and/or political views ==
Seymour declined to serve in the political arena so he could devote his time to the medical field. His family were all Roman Catholic.

== Awards ==
For service during the North-West Rebellion, Seymour received the North-West Rebellion medal. The Fellowship of the Royal Institute of Public Health from England was conferred upon him in 1920. During the same year he was also declared fellow of the American Public Health Association. Seymour was chosen to represent Canada at the Geneva, Switzerland health conference along with eighteen other representatives of other countries.

== Notes ==
^{A} During this time frame the spelling was North West Territories. Northwest as one word was a 1905 adoption.
^{B} Winnipeg: Established 1738 as Fort Rouge; renamed 1822 Fort Garry; incorporated in 1873 as the City of Winnipeg.
^{C} Sandwich: In 1794, after the American Revolution, the settlement of Sandwich was founded. Windsor, Ontario, was established as a village in 1854 (the same year the village was connected to the rest of Canada, by the Grand Trunk Railway/Canadian National Railway), then a town in 1858, and ultimately gained city status in 1892.
