= Valley City, North Dakota =

- City
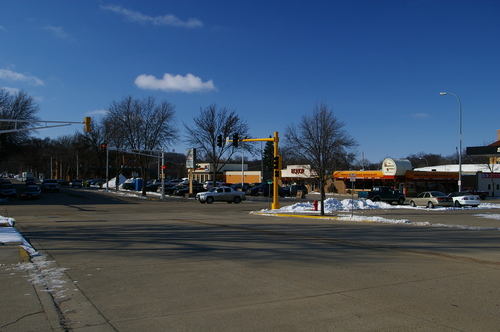
- Central Ave and Main Street in Valley City

- Logo
- Nickname: "City of Bridges"
- Interactive map of Valley City, North Dakota
- Location within North Dakota
- Coordinates: 46.9226°N 98.0041°W
- Country: United States
- State: North Dakota
- County: Barnes
- Founded: 1872
- Established: 1874
- Incorporated (village): 1881
- Incorporated (city): May 2, 1883

Government
  - President: Dave Carlsrud (D)
  - Commissioner: Duane Magnuson; Mike Bishop; Jeff Erickson; Dick Gulmon

Area
  - City: 4.300 sq mi (11.137 km^{2})
  - Land: 4.296 sq mi (11.127 km^{2})
  - Water: 0.0039 sq mi (0.010 km^{2}) 0.09%
- Elevation: 1,220 ft (372 m)

Population (2020)
  - City: 6,575
  - Estimate (2025): 6,430
  - Density: 1,530/sq mi (590.9/km^{2})
  - Urban: 6,547
  - Metro: 10,573
- Time zone: UTC–6 (Central (CST))
  - Summer (DST): UTC–5 (CDT)
- ZIP Code: 58072
- Area code: 701
- FIPS code: 38-81180
- GNIS feature ID: 1032618
- Highways: I-94, I-94 Bus., US 52
- Website: valleycity.us

Valley City is a city in and the county seat of Barnes County, North Dakota, United States. The population was 6,575 as of the 2020 census, and was estimated at 6,430 in 2025, making it the 13th most populous city in North Dakota.

Valley City is known for its many bridges over the Sheyenne River, including the Hi-Line Railroad Bridge. These bridges have earned it the nickname "City of Bridges". The city is also the home of Valley City State University and the North Dakota High School Activities Association (NDHSAA).

== History ==
Valley City was established in 1874 with the building of a railroad station. The town was originally named Worthington after the town's promoter, George Worthington. The present name is for the city's location in the valley of the Sheyenne River. A post office was established under the name Worthington in 1874, and has continued to operate under the name Valley City since 1878. A Carnegie Library opened in 1903 through the efforts of the "Tuesday Club," a local women's organization. The inception of the nation's first barber association occurred in Valley City during a state barber convention in February, 1909.

== Geography ==
According to the United States Census Bureau, the city has a total area of 4.300 square miles (11.14 km^{2}), of which 4.296 square miles (11.13 km^{2}) is land and 0.004 square miles (0.010 km^{2}) (0.09%) is water.

== Climate ==
This climatic region is typified by large seasonal temperature differences, with warm to hot (and often humid) summers and cold (sometimes severely cold) winters. According to the Köppen Climate Classification system Valley City has a humid continental climate, abbreviated "Dfb" on climate maps.

== Demographics ==
Historical population
Census	Pop.	Note	%±
1880	302		—
1890	1,089		260.6%
1900	2,446		124.6%
1910	4,606		88.3%
1920	4,686		1.7%
1930	5,268		12.4%
1940	5,917		12.3%
1950	6,851		15.8%
1960	7,809		14.0%
1970	7,843		0.4%
1980	7,774		−0.9%
1990	7,163		−7.9%
2000	6,826		−4.7%
2010	6,585		−3.5%
2020	6,575		−0.2%
2025 (est.)	6,430		−2.2%
U.S. Decennial Census; 2020 Census

According to realtor website Zillow, the average price of a home as of May 31, 2026, in Valley City was $204,236.

As of the 2024 American Community Survey, there were 2,984 estimated households in Valley City with an average of 1.97 persons per household. The city has a median household income of $60,339. Approximately 16.7% of the city's population lives at or below the poverty line. Valley City has an estimated 57.8% employment rate, with 31.4% of the population holding a bachelor's degree or higher and 93.2% holding a high school diploma. There were 3,304 housing units at an average density of 769.09 per square mile (296.9/km^{2}).

The top five reported languages (people were allowed to report up to two languages, thus the figures will generally add to more than 100%) were English (95.2%), Spanish (1.3%), Indo-European (1.5%), Asian and Pacific Islander (2.0%), and Other (0.0%).

The median age in the city was 39.4 years.

Valley City, North Dakota – racial and ethnic composition Note: the US Census treats Hispanic/Latino as an ethnic category. This table excludes Latinos from the racial categories and assigns them to a separate category. Hispanics/Latinos may be of any race.
Race / ethnicity (NH = non-Hispanic)	Pop. 1980	Pop. 1990	Pop. 2000	Pop. 2010	Pop. 2020
White alone (NH)	7,723 (99.34%)	7,036 (98.23%)	6,603 (96.73%)	6,214 (94.37%)	5,890 (89.58%)
Black or African American alone (NH)	0 (0.00%)	23 (0.32%)	50 (0.73%)	79 (1.20%)	173 (2.63%)
Native American or Alaska Native alone (NH)	51 (0.66%)	42 (0.59%)	51 (0.75%)	47 (0.71%)	71 (1.08%)
Asian alone (NH)	0 (0.00%)	37 (0.52%)	19 (0.28%)	54 (0.82%)	67 (1.02%)
Pacific Islander alone (NH)	—	—	0 (0.00%)	1 (0.02%)	2 (0.03%)
Other race alone (NH)	0 (0.00%)	0 (0.00%)	2 (0.03%)	0 (0.00%)	15 (0.23%)
Mixed race or multiracial (NH)	—	—	45 (0.66%)	94 (1.43%)	211 (3.21%)
Hispanic or Latino (any race)	0 (0.00%)	25 (0.35%)	56 (0.82%)	96 (1.46%)	146 (2.22%)
Total	7,774 (100.00%)	7,163 (100.00%)	6,826 (100.00%)	6,585 (100.00%)	6,575 (100.00%)

=== 2020 census ===
As of the 2020 census, there were 6,575 people, 2,966 households, and 1,454 families residing in the city. The population density was 1,581.29 inhabitants per square mile (610.5/km^{2}). There were 3,391 housing units at an average density of 815.54 per square mile (314.9/km^{2}). The racial makeup of the city was 90.22% White, 2.77% African American, 1.19% Native American, 1.02% Asian, 0.05% Pacific Islander, 0.96% from some other races and 3.80% from two or more races. Hispanic or Latino people of any race were 2.22% of the population.

There were 2,966 households out of which 20.9% had children under the age of 18 living with them, 36.6% were married couples living together, 31.0% had a female householder with no husband present, and _% were non-families. 43.2% of all households were made up of individuals and 18.9% had someone living alone who was 65 years of age or older. The average household size was 2._ and the average family size was 2._.

In the city the population was spread out with 5.1% were under 5 years of age, 18.6% under the age of 18, _% from 18 to 24, _% from 25 to 44, _% from 45 to 64, and 22.9% who were 65 years of age or older. The median age was 39.8 years. For every 100 females there were 98.2 males. For every 100 females age 18 and over, there were 96.5 males. The gender makeup of the city was 50.3% male and 49.7% female.

The median income for a household in the city was $_, and the median income for a family was $_. Males had a median income of $_ versus $_ for females. The per capita income for the city was $_. _% of the population and _% of families were below the poverty line. Out of the total people living in poverty, _% were under the age of 18 and _% were 65 or older.

99.6% of residents lived in urban areas, while 0.4% lived in rural areas.

26.1% were households with a male householder and no spouse or partner present.

There were 3,391 housing units, of which 12.5% were vacant. The homeowner vacancy rate was 2.3% and the rental vacancy rate was 14.7%.

=== 2010 census ===
As of the 2010 census, there were 6,585 people, 2,986 households, and 1,563 families living in the city. The population density was 1,903.5 inhabitants per square mile (734.9/km^{2}). There were 3,307 housing units at an average density of 955.8 per square mile (369.0/km^{2}). The racial makeup of the city was 95.22% White, 1.25% African American, 0.73% Native American, 0.82% Asian, 0.03% Pacific Islander, 0.24% from some other races and 1.72% from two or more races. Hispanic or Latino people of any race were 1.46% of the population.

There were 2,986 households 22.6% had children under the age of 18 living with them, 41.1% were married couples living together, 7.9% had a female householder with no husband present, 3.3% had a male householder with no wife present, and 47.7% were non-families. 39.4% of households were one person and 17.9% were one person aged 65 or older. The average household size was 2.04 and the average family size was 2.74.

The median age was 42.1 years. 18.7% of residents were under the age of 18; 13.2% were between the ages of 18 and 24; 21.1% were from 25 to 44; 24.9% were from 45 to 64; and 22.0% were 65 or older. The gender makeup of the city was 48.1% male and 51.9% female.

=== 2000 census ===
As of the 2000 census, there were 6,826 people, 2,996 households, and 1,668 families living in the city. The population density was 2,062.5 inhabitants per square mile (796.3/km^{2}). There were 3,250 housing units at an average density of 982.0 per square mile (379.2/km^{2}). The racial makeup of the city was 97.39% White, 0.73% African American, 0.75% Native American, 0.28% Asian, 0.00% Pacific Islander, 0.19% from some other races and 0.66% from two or more races. Hispanic or Latino people of any race were 0.82% of the population.

The top six ancestry groups in the city are German (45.5%), Norwegian (38.8%), Irish (9.1%), Swedish (5.2%), French (4.8%), English (3.8%).

There were 2,996 households 23.3% had children under the age of 18 living with them, 44.6% were married couples living together, 8.1% had a female householder with no husband present, and 44.3% were non-families. 38.3% of households were one person and 19.6% were one person aged 65 or older. The average household size was 2.09 and the average family size was 2.77.

The age distribution was 18.8% under the age of 18, 15.3% from 18 to 24, 21.4% from 25 to 44, 21.4% from 45 to 64, and 23.1% 65 or older. The median age was 41 years. For every 100 females, there were 89.4 males. For every 100 females age 18 and over, there were 87.5 males.

The median household income was $28,050 and the median family income was $41,604. Males had a median income of $30,035 versus $17,667 for females. The per capita income for the city was $16,257. About 5.5% of families and 12.4% of the population were below the poverty line, including 11.9% of those under age 18 and 12.8% of those age 65 or over.

== Local media ==
=== Television ===
KRDK-TV (channel 4) is licensed to and broadcasts from Valley City, serving the Fargo and Grand Forks television market.

=== AM radio ===
AM radio stations
Frequency	Call sign	Name	Format	Owner	City of license
1490 AM	KOVC	The Voice of the Valley KOVC	Full Service/Country	i3G Media	Valley City

=== FM radio ===
FM radio stations
Frequency	Call sign	Name	Format	Owner	City of license
96.3 FM	K242CZ	The Voice of the Valley KOVC	Full Service/Country; KOVC translator	i3G Media	Valley City
102.7 FM	K274BH	Ted FM	Adult Contemporary; KRVX-HD2 translator	i3G Media	Valley City

- CSiCable

The local newspaper is the Valley City Times-Record.

== Education ==
=== K–12 ===
Valley City is served by the Valley City Public School District which consists of Jefferson Elementary School, Washington Elementary School, and Valley City High School. St. Catherine's Catholic School for grade K–6 also serves students in Valley City.

=== Higher education ===
- Valley City State University

== Sites of interest ==
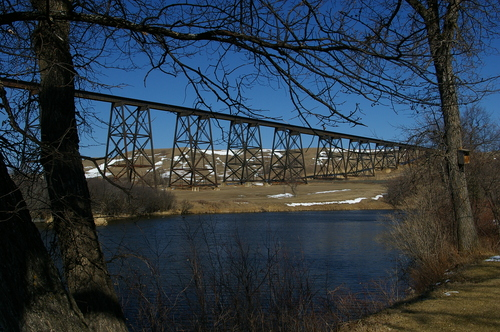
Hi Line Railroad Bridge as seen from Chautauqua Park, Valley City

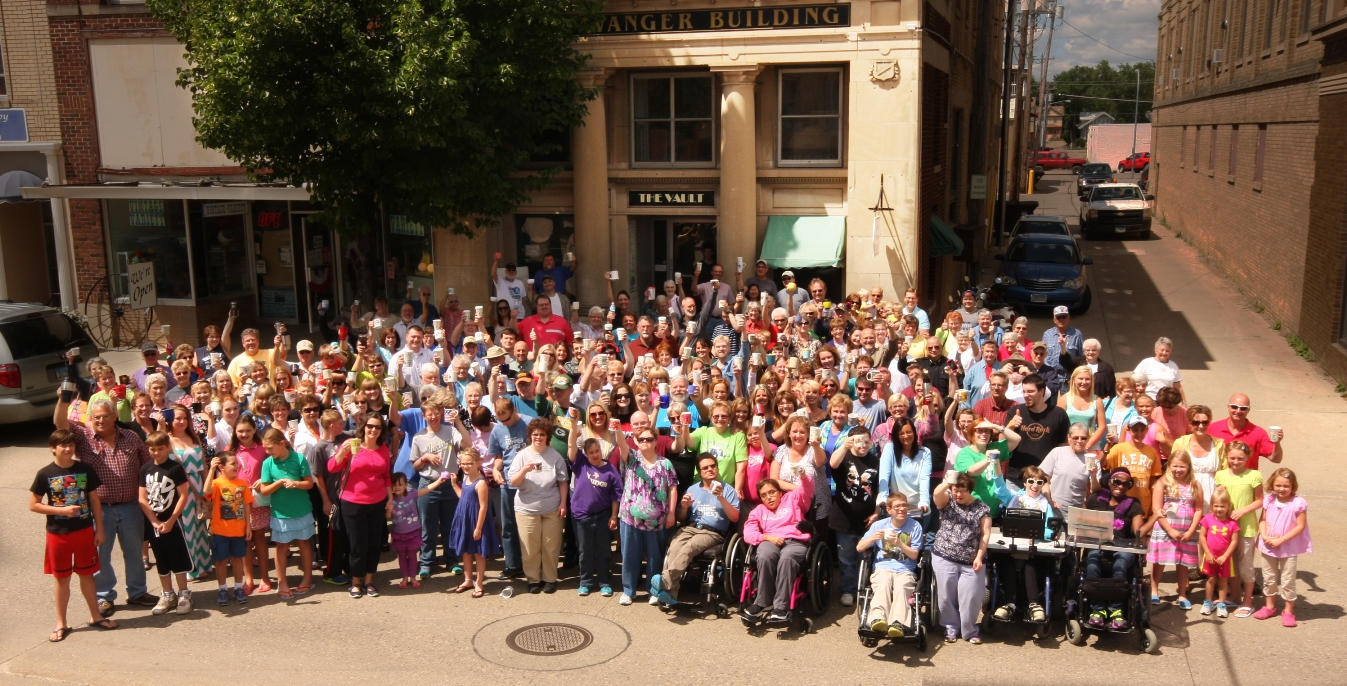
The Vault honor system coffee shop in Valley City

- Hi-Line Railroad Bridge
- North Dakota Winter Show
- North Country Trail
- The Rosebud Visitor Center contains a restored railway passenger car.
- The Vault (Coffee Shop)

== Transportation ==
Intercity bus service to the city is provided by Jefferson Lines. Local dial-a-ride transit is provided by South Central Transit which operates on weekdays from 8am to 5pm and weekends from 8am to 2pm for a $2 fare.

Valley City Parks and Recreation operates a bikeshare system with a single station located at the Gaukler Family Wellness Center.

Valley City is located on Interstate 94 and U.S. Route 52:

- 36 miles east of Jamestown
- 62 miles west of Fargo
- 135 miles east of Bismarck

The local airport is the Barnes County Municipal Airport, located just north of the city.

== Notable people ==
- Jeff Boschee, former professional basketball player and current head coach at Pittsburgh State
- Paul Fjelde, sculptor; professor at Pratt Institute
- John E. Grotberg, congressman
- Peggy Lee, jazz and popular music singer, songwriter, composer, and actress
- George W. Mason, chairman and CEO of Kelvinator and American Motors Company
- James M. McPherson, Civil War historian; Pulitzer Prize winner
- Gerhard Brandt Naeseth, genealogist; founder of the Norwegian-American Genealogical Center & Naeseth Library
- Earl Pomeroy, congressman
- Ann Sothern, film and TV actress with two stars on the Hollywood Walk of Fame
- Herman Stern, proprietor of Straus Clothing, businessman, humanitarian, social and economic activist
- Tyrell Terry, professional basketball player
- Carol Thurston, actress
- Frank White, eighth governor of North Dakota and treasurer of the United States (1921–1928)
- Michael Wobbema, member of the North Dakota Senate
- George M. Young, congressman, judge
