= Scouting in Montana =

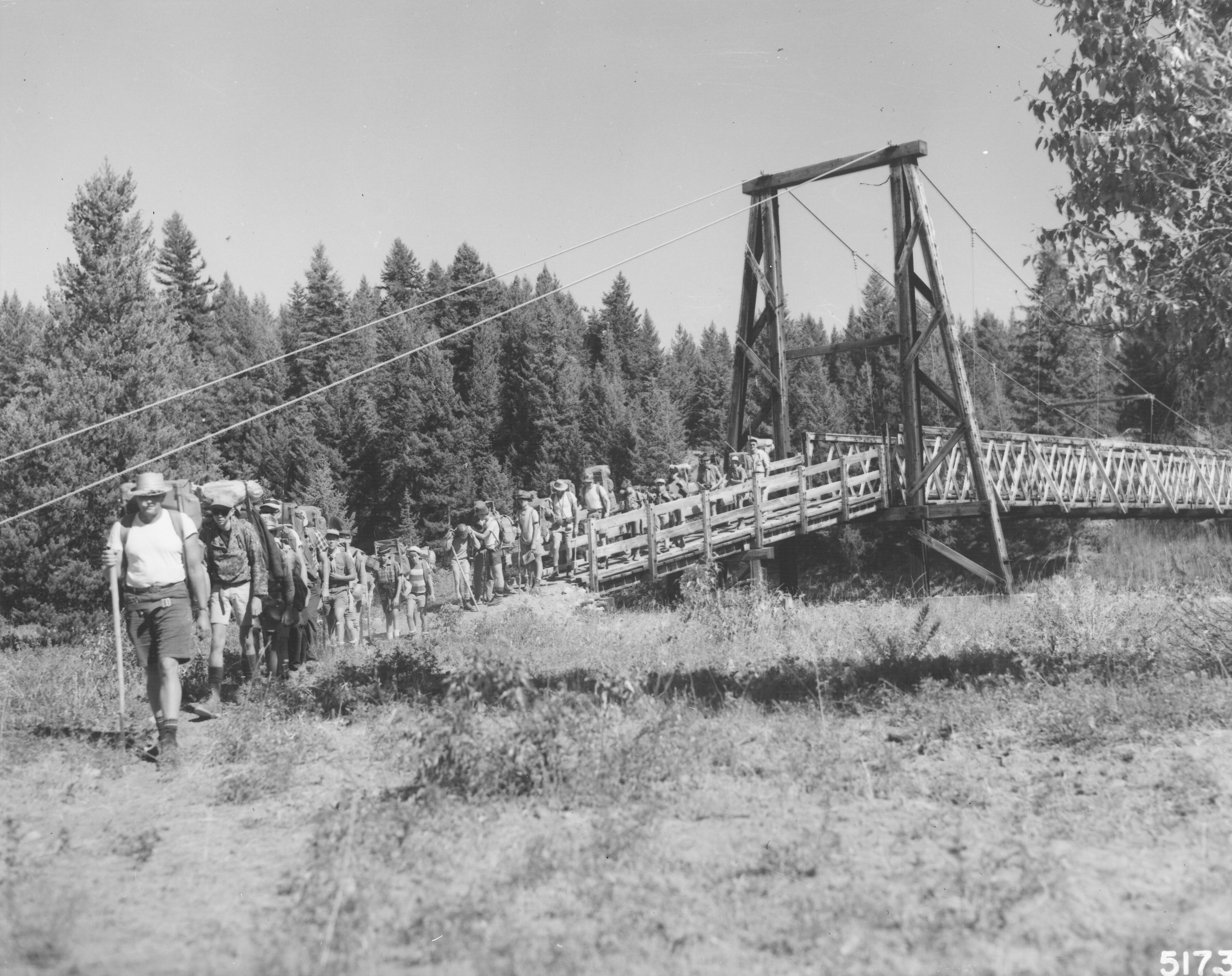
- Scouts hiking in Bob Marshall Wilderness

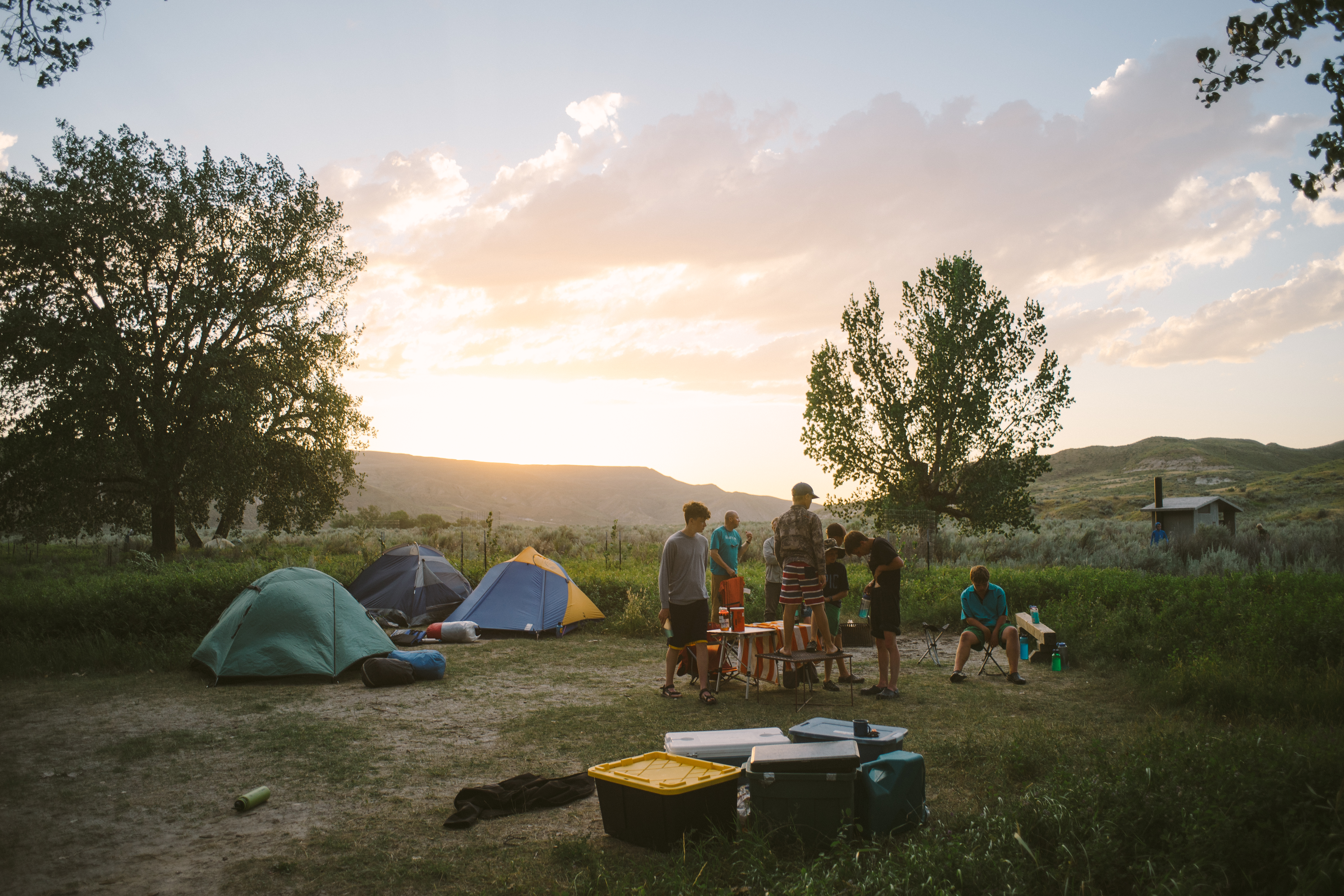
- Scouts at the Upper Missouri River Breaks

Scouting in Montana has a long history, from the 1910s to the present day, serving thousands of youth in programs that suit the environment in which they live.

== Early history (1910-1950) ==
The first, Boy Scout troop in Montana was organized in Butte in September of 1910 by Elizabeth Groenveld. In February 1917 Troop 1 in Butte held an event for the public which included music, as well as "exhibition drills, first aid work, and signalling, closing with the presentation of a play." Also in 1917, this same troop made the news because their activities inspired the creation of a new troop in nearby Centerville, "Twenty-two boys made the trip [a hike from Butte to Divide and back], which was filled with tests for the boys... En route one of the boys suffered from a strained back. A litter was built for him and he was carried to the destination. This was a test in first-aid work... Another hike will be held when the weather permits. The boys were forced to trudge through deep snow on their Washington birthday trip."

By 1918, unofficial Wolf Cub packs appeared in Butte.

In 1920, the Deer Lodge County Council (#314) was formed, changing its name in 1924 to the Deer Lodge Area Council (#314). In 1926 the Deer Lodge Area Council changed its name to the Deer Lodge, Granite, and Powell Council (#314). In 1928, the Deer Lodge, Granite, and Powell Council merged into the Silver Bow Council (#313). In 1919, the Helena Council (#316) was formed, changing its name in 1925 to the Lewis and Clark Area Council (#316) and, changing its name again in 1931 to the Elkhorn Area Council (#316). The Elkhorn Area Council closed that same year. In 1922, the Helena Council (#317) was formed, changing its name in 1923 to the Glacier Park Area Council (#317). The Glacier Park Area Council closed in 1927. In 1920, the Park County Council (#319) was formed, changing its name in 1923 to the Park and Sweetgrass Counties Council (#319) and, changing its name again in 1924 to the Yellowstone Council (#319). The Yellowstone Council closed in 1926. In 1920, the Custer County Council (#321) was formed, changing its name in 1924 to the Powder River Area Council (#321) and, closing in 1926.

In 1918, the Butte City Council (#313) was formed, changing its name in 1927 to the Silver Bow Council (#313). In 1944, Silver Bow changed its name to the Vigilante Council (#313). In 1915, the Great Falls Council (#315) was formed, changing its name in 1925 to the Great Falls Area Council (#315). In 1929, the Great Falls Area Council changed its name to the North Central Montana Council (#315). In 1922, the Lewiston Council (#318) was formed, changing its name in 1922 to the Central Montana Council (#318). The Central Montana Council closed in 1924. In 1928, the Yellowstone Valley Council (#318) was formed. In 1920, the Missoula Council (#320) was formed, changing its name in 1922 to the Missoula County Council (#320). In 1926 the Missoula County Council changed its name to the Western Montana Council (#320).

== Recent history (1950-1990) ==
In 1973, the Vigilante Area, Western Montana, Yellowstone Valley and North Central Montana councils all merged to make the Montana Council (#315).

== Boy Scouts of America in Montana today ==
There are two Boy Scouts of America (BSA) local councils in Montana. Most of Montana lies within the Montana Council, except for Daniels and Sheridan counties, which are part of the Northern Lights Council.

=== Montana Council ===
Montana Council (#315)
- Headquarters: Great Falls, Montana
- Country: United States
- Founded: 1973
- President: Walt McIntosh
- Council Commissioner: Scott Hooper
- Scout Executive: Jory Dellinger
- Website; Montana Council

==== History ====
The Montana Council formed in 1973 from the merger of four councils: the Vigilante Area Council, Western Montana Council, Yellowstone Valley Council and the North Central Montana Council.

==== Camps ====
The largest of its council camps is K-M Scout Ranch (pronounced K bar M), located 23 miles (37 km) north of Lewistown near the old mining town of Kendall.

=== Northern Lights Council ===
As of 2006, Northern Lights Council serves all of North Dakota, and parts of South Dakota, northwest Minnesota and northeast Montana.

== Girl Scouting in Montana ==
Girl Scouting in Montana
- Map of Girl Scout Council in Montana

=== Girl Scouts of Montana and Wyoming ===
Girl Scouts of Montana and Wyoming is the only council serving both Montana and Wyoming. It was formed on May 1, 2008, by the merger of Girl Scouts of Big Sky Council, Girl Scouts Treasure Trails Council, and Girl Scout Council of Wyoming.

Headquarters
Billings, Montana
Website
www.gsmw.org
Service Centers

- Great Falls, Montana
- Casper, Wyoming

Camps

- Camp Castle Rock is just south of Butte, Montana
- Camp Sacajawea is near Casper, Wyoming
- Timbercrest Camp is on the west fork of Rock Creek in the Beartooth Mountains near Red Lodge, Montana
- Camp Open Door is near Jackson, Wyoming
- Camp Care Free is near Cheyenne, Wyoming

== See also ==
- Scouting in Alberta
- Scouting in British Columbia
- Scouting in Saskatchewan
