= List of councils (Scouts Canada) =

Local councils of Scouts Canada
- Scouting and Guiding in Canada's provinces and territories

The program of Scouts Canada is administered through councils, (previously referred to as regions which reported to the Provincial Council, when Scouts Canada was a federated structure) with each council covering a geographic area that may vary from a census metropolitan area (CMA) in British Columbia, Alberta, and Ontario, to an entire province, the case with most councils. Councils are subdivided into areas, based on membership and ability to provide local service. Each council is managed by a Council Commissioner, Council Youth Commissioner, and Council Relationship Manager.

== Current councils of Scouts Canada ==
Current councils of Scouts Canada
Council name	Headquarters city	Headquarters province	Camps
Battlefields Council	London	Ontario	Camp Dayhondaylaquah; Camp Impeesa; Camp Nemo; Camp Wetaskiwin; Ragged Falls Scout Camp
Cascadia Council	Vancouver	British Columbia, Yukon	Camp Barnard
Central Escarpment Council	Mississauga	Ontario	
Chinook Council	Calgary	Alberta	
Fraser Valley Council	Langley	British Columbia	
Greater Toronto Council	Toronto	Ontario	Haliburton Scout Reserve; Woodland Trails
Manitoba Council	Winnipeg	Manitoba	
New Brunswick Council	Fredericton	New Brunswick	
Newfoundland and Labrador Council	Paradise	Newfoundland and Labrador	
Northern Lights Council	Edmonton	Alberta, Northwest Territories	
Northern Ontario Council	Thunder Bay	Ontario	Camp Bimoba - Scout Island; Dog Lake Scout Cabin; Grey Wolf Scout Camp; Camp Marwick; Camp Mitchell; Nellie Lake Camp; Timber Lake Scout Camp; Camp Wilabosca; Camp Wirribara
Nova Scotia Council	Dartmouth	Nova Scotia	Camp Impeeza; Camp Nedooae
Pacific Coast Council	Vancouver	British Columbia	
Prince Edward Island Council	Charlottetown	Prince Edward Island	
Quebec Council	Dorval	Quebec (excluding Outaouais region)	Tamaracouta Scout Reserve
Saskatchewan Council	Saskatoon	Saskatchewan	
Shining Waters Council	Barrie	Ontario	
Tri-Shores Council	London	Ontario	Camp Attawandaron; Camp BEL; Camp Cataraqui; Camp Cedarwin; Camp Shegardaynou; Camp Sylvan; Camp Timken; Spencer Park
Voyageur Council	Ottawa	Ontario, Quebec (Outaouais region of western Quebec only), Nunavut	Apple Hill Scout Reserve; Camp Folly; Camp Legewade; Camp Opemikon; Otter Lake Camp (Ontario); Otter Lake Camp (Quebec); Camp Sheldrick; Camp Traill; Whispering Pines
White Pine Council	Oshawa	Ontario	Camp Samac; Brookwood Scout Reserve; Cobourg Scout Reserve; Camp Gilroy; Langley Park Scout Reserve; Sagonaska Scout Reserve

== See also ==
- Local councils of the Boy Scouts of America
- List of councils (Girl Scouts of the USA)
