= Scouting and Guiding in Ontario =

Scouting and Guiding in Ontario has a long history. Although there is some dispute about the founding of the first Scouting Group, both 1st Merrickville and 1st St. Catharines Scout Group have a documented existence from 1908. In 1955, the 8th World Scout Jamboree was held at Niagara-on-the-Lake, Ontario. Scouting continues in Ontario to the present day, serving thousands of youths in programs that suit the environment in which they live.

== Scouting organizations in Ontario ==
Scouting and Guiding in Ontario

There are several Scouting organizations operating in Ontario. The largest of these is Scouts Canada, which had a combined youth and adult membership as of August 2007 of 99,573, down from 265,313 in 1990. While most Scouts Canada groups operate in English, some operate in French, and French language handbooks and resource material are available. Scouting in the French language is also provided under the auspices of L'Association des Scouts du Canada (sometimes referred to as Les Scouts). These groups are situated mostly in the eastern and north eastern parts of the province which have a higher concentration of francophone residents. Together, Scouts Canada and the Association des Scouts du Canada are members of the World Organization of the Scout Movement (WOSM).

Ontario has several organizations which are not part of WOSM. In some cases, they were created because members felt that Scouts Canada had drifted too far from the program originally developed by Scouting's founder, Baden Powell. Some trace their roots to the Baden-Powell Scouts' Association in the United Kingdom:

- BPSA Ontario, which is part of BPSA in Canada.
- Canadian Traditional Scouting Association
- The Federation of North-American Explorers (FNE) are members of the Catholic International Union of Guides and Scouts of Europe and has groups in Thornhill, Toronto, and Ottawa.

There are at least three ethnic or culturally based Scouting associations which operate in Ontario:

- ZHR Polish Scouts of Canada (Związek Harcerstwa Rzeczypospolitej w Kanadzie) was founded in 1996 and has units in the Greater Toronto Area and Peterborough, Ontario and is not affiliated to Związek Harcerstwa Rzeczypospolitej in Poland.
- Polish Scouting Association in Canada Incorporated (Związek Harcerstwa Polskiego Poza Granicami Kraju), a Polish émigré organization, also not connected to Związek Harcerstwa Polskiego in Poland.
- Plast, a Ukrainian émigré organization. Plast is also the name of the National Scout Organization of Ukraine.

== Scouts Canada ==
=== History of Provincial Council for Ontario ===
On December 21, 1910 his Excellency Earl Grey, Governor General of Canada and Chief Scout for Canada, together with His Honour J.M. Gibson, Lieutenant Governor of Ontario, Dr. K.A. Pyne, Ontario Minister of Education, and a number of prominent citizens from all parts of the province, met in Toronto to select gentlemen who are interested and who would assist in the Boy Scout Movement and form a Council for Ontario.

For many years Scouts Canada scouting in Ontario was led by this Provincial Council for Ontario, under which operated numerous regional councils the exact number and geography of which changed over the years. However, in 2002 when Scouts Canada reorganized, the provincial council ceased to exist and the eight councils remaining in Ontario reported directly to the national council. An incorporated body still exists for the purpose of holding ownership of property as required by provincial laws.

==== Presidents of the Provincial Council for Ontario ====
- 1910–1913 W.K. George
- 1913–1920 Lt. Col. A.E. Gooderham
- 1920–1922 G.E. Fauquier
- 1922–1936 J.W. Mitchell
- 1936–1938 P.G. Cherry
- 1938–1939 Col. Sir G.McL. Brown
- 1939–1945 W.J. Cairns
- 1945–1951 A.H. Richardson
- 1951–1957 J.B. Ridley
- 1957–1959 W.H.J. Tisdale
- 1959–1961 I.D. MacArthur
- 1961–1962 A.R. Aylsworth
- 1963–1964 J.B. Ridley
- 1964–1965 W.R. Kay, F.C.A.
- 1966–1967 E.A Jarrett
- 1968–1969 K.R. Van Wyck
- 1970–1971 J.K McKay
- 1972–1974 Stanley Lovell
- 1974–1975 Judge Charles O. Bick
- 1975–1977 Dr. B.M. Jackson
- 1977-1978 W.B. Tilden
- 1978-1979 F.L Greaves
- 1979-1981 R.A. Norman
- 1981-1983 W.A. Baker
- 1983-1985 T.D. Philp
- 1985-1987 M.W. Townsend
- 1987-1990 H.R. Finley
- 1990-1993 L.R.L. Symmes
- 1993-1995 J.S. Cowan
- 1995-1998 D.W. Hamilten
- 1998-2000 R. Dychuck
- 2000-2002 Kathryn Brown (1st female Ontario Council President)

==== Provincial Commissioners ====
- 1910-1913 Capt R.S. Wilson
- 1913-1922 W.K. George
- 1922-1924 J.F.M. Stewart
- 1924-1934 H.A. Laurence
- 1934-1938 W.J. Cairns
- 1938-1941 Lt. Col. R.P. Locke
- 1941-1948 Lt. Col. L.H. Millen
- 1948-1957 W.H.J. Tisdale
- 1957-1964 F.A. Worth
- 1965-1966 R.A. Phillips
- 1966-1969 A.W. Denny
- 1969-1972 Rev. Prof. Dr. R.J. Williams
- 1972-1976 C.J. Clark
- 1976-1978 F.L. Greaves
- 1978-1980 D.M. Deacon
- 1980-1983 F.A. Whiskin
- 1983-1986 E.R. McCrimmon
- 1986-1989 H. Coulson, C.D.
- 1989-1992 K.H Robertson
- 1992-1994 Rev. P. Jackson
- 1994-1997 J.A. Evans (1st female Ontario Provincial Commissioner)
- 1997-1999 T. Godfrey
- 1999-2002 C. Lawrence

==== Provincial Executive Directors ====
(Previously known as Provincial Scout Executive or Provincial Executive Commissioner or Executive Secretary. In early years it also carried the title of Assistant Provincial Commissioner.)

- 1910–1920 Capt. H.G. Hammond
- 1920–1954 Frank C. Irwin
- 1955–1969 Reginald St.J. Terrett
- 1969–1989 Joseph E. Turner
- 1989–1995 Frank C. Spence
- 1996–2002 Barry M. Hardaker

Col. Rufus Spooner of The Salvation Army acted as Provincial Executive Commissioner following Frank Irwin's sudden death until the appointment of Reg Terrett.

==== Scouts Canada and WOSM Jamborees held in Ontario ====
- 1949: 1st Canadian Scout Jamboree, Connaught Ranges, Ottawa, Ontario. 2,579 attend.
- 1953: 2nd Canadian Scout Jamboree, Connaught Ranges, Ottawa, Ontario. 1,196 attend.
- 1955: 8th World Scout Jamboree Niagara-on-the-Lake, Ontario
- 1961: 3rd Canadian Scout Jamboree, Connaught Ranges, Ottawa, Ontario. 2,095 attend.
- 1985: 6th Canadian Scout Jamboree, Guelph Lake Conservation Area, Guelph, Ontario. 12,000 attend.
- 1997: 9th Canadian Scout Jamboree, Boulevard Lake Park, Thunder Bay, Ontario. 13,879 attend.

=== Scouts Canada councils in Ontario ===
Ontario is administered in Scouts Canada by 8 Councils divided into Service Areas.

- Battlefields Council
  - Brant Area
  - Fruitbelt
  - Haldimand
  - Hamilton-Wentworth Area
  - Lynn Valley
  - Merritt Trail
  - Niagara Area
  - South Waterloo Area
  - St. Catharines Area
- Central Escarpment Council
  - Brampton Area (merged with Greater Halton Area to form Credit Hills Area in 2010)
  - Burlington Area
  - Credit Hills Area
  - Greater Halton Area (merged with Brampton Area to form Credit Hills Area in 2010)
  - Mississauga Area
  - North Waterloo Area
  - Oakville Area
  - Wellington Area
  - Yellow Briar Area
- Greater Toronto Council
  - Alders Area
  - Agincourt Area
  - Humber West Area
  - Old Mill Area
    - 68th Toronto Scout Group
  - Scarborough Area
  - Seton Area
  - Skyline Area
  - Sunnybrook Area
  - Willow Valley Area
- Northern Ontario Council
  - Nipissing Area
  - Sault Ste. Marie Area
  - Sudbury Area
  - Thunder Bay Area
  - Black River Area
  - Points North Area
  - Ken Kee Area
  - Sunset Area
- Shining Waters Council
  - Northern Lights Area
  - Simcoe Phoenix Area
    - 14th Barrie
  - South Lake Simcoe Area
  - Sunset Area
  - Wendake Shores Area (Merged with Whispering Pines in 2013.)
  - Whispering Pines Area
  - York Headwaters Area
- Tri-Shores Council
  - Elgin Area
  - London Area
  - Sydenham Area
  - Windsor Area
  - Essex Area
  - Chatham/Kent Area
  - Bluewater Area
  - Frontier Area
  - Mindaamin Area
- Voyageur Council
  - Heritage Area
  - Loyalist Area (Kingston/Frontenac)
  - Nunavut
  - Nepean Area
  - Valley Highlands Area
  - Rideau Area
  - Upper St. Lawrence Valley Area
  - Algonquin Hills Area
  - Odawa Area
  - Carleton Area
- White Pine Council
  - Oshawa Area
  - Algonquinte Area
  - Kawartha Waterways Area
  - Owasco Area
  - Trillium Highlands Area
  - Whitby Area
  - Lakeshore Ridge Area

=== Scouts Canada Council camp sites ===
Because much of scouting's programs are focused on the outdoors, a large number of properties have been donated or purchased and developed as scouting campgrounds over the years. Driven by declining membership, increasing costs, and liability issues, Scouts Canada conducted a property review in Ontario which concluded that dozens of camps should be sold. This has resulted in legal action between the Scouts Canada Ontario Incorporated Body and local Scouters. Action was underway in November 2005 and is ongoing. Scouts Canada's camps in Ontario are generally administered by one of the four Administrative Centres. The following list is as of May 14, 2007:

==== Central Ontario ====
- Blue Springs Scout Reserve (near Acton, Ontario)
- Camp Char'Bro (near Owen Sound, Ontario)
- Camp Everton (near Rockwood, Ontario)
- Goodyear Memorial Scout Camp (near Orangeville, Ontario)
- Green Bay Scout Camp (Lake Cecebe, Ontario on the Magnetawan River system)
- Haliburton Scout Reserve (near Haliburton, Ontario)
- Camp Manitou (near Campbellville, Ontario)
- Camp Wildman Scout Camp (near Midland, Ontario)
- Woodland Trails Scout Camp (near Stouffville, Ontario)

==== Eastern Ontario ====
- Camp Apple Hill (in Odawa Area)
- Camp Opemikon (near Perth, Ontario)
- Otter Lake (Otter Lake, Quebec)
- Otter Lake, Ontario (beside Frontenac Provincial Park)
- Camp Legewade (near Renfrew, Ontario)
- Camp Folly (southeast shore of Newboro Lake)
- Camp Oskenonton (on Buck Lake)
- Camp Samac (in Oshawa, Ontario)
- Camp Sheldrick (near Winchester, Ontario)

==== Southwestern Ontario ====
- Camp Attawandaron (near Grand Bend, Ontario and bordering Pinery Provincial Park)
- Barber Memorial Scout Camp (in Guelph, Ontario adjacent to the Eramosa River)
- Camp BEL (in Dorchester, Ontario east of London, Ontario)
- The Bryson Centre (in the north end of London, Ontario)
- Camp Cataraqui (east of Chatham, Ontario)
- Camp Cedarwin (near Kingsville, Ontario)
- Camp Impeesa (near Brantford, Ontario)
- Camp Mohawk (in Kitchener, Ontario)
- Camp Manitou (in Milton, Ontario)
- Mount Nemo Camp (near Burlington, Ontario)
- Ragged Falls (near Dwight, Ontario)
- Camp Shegardaynou (near Woodstock, Ontario)
- Camp Sylvan (north of London, Ontario)
- Camp Timkin (near St Thomas, Ontario)
- Camp Wadiscoca (near Wallaceburg, Ontario)
- Camp Wetaskiwin (near St. Catharines, Ontario)

==== Northern Ontario ====
- Camp Bimoba (on Scout Island - Middle Lake, Kenora, Ontario)
- Grey Wolf (Thunder Bay, Ontario)
- Wilabosca (Sudbury, Ontario)

==== Other facilities and province-wide events ====
- Belleville District Scout-Guide Museum
- Scout Brigade of Fort George , Niagara-on-the-Lake
- Gilwell Reunion

=== 129th Toronto Scouting Group ===
The 129th Toronto Scouting Group (also known as the Queer Toronto Scouting Group) was believed to be the first group worldwide exclusively for gay, lesbian, and bisexual youths and adults. The group was founded by gay activist Bonte Minnema and chartered by Scouts Canada in 1999. Consistent with Scouts Canada policy, the group was co-ed. It made world headlines, including the BBC World News, when a story by Reuters first brought attention to the group's existence.

In October 1999, American Pastor Fred Phelps and his congregation at the Westboro Baptist Church planned to protest outside the Ontario offices of Scouts Canada. However, Canada Customs denied them entry into the country. This prevented Phelps and his church members from appearing, and left supporters of the group to rally outside the offices without opposition.

The group folded in 2001 due to a lack of interest.

== Girl Guiding in Ontario ==
Ontario Council (Girl Guides of Canada)

Mary Malcolmson organized the first Canadian Girl Guide Company to be officially registered in St. Catharines, Ontario; their registration is dated January, 1910. A park in St. Catharines was later named for Mary Malcolmson. Other Guide Companies were registered later in 1910, in Toronto. The First Toronto Company held the first-recorded Girl Guide Camp in Canada on the banks of the Credit River in June, 1911. By 1912, the movement had spread to all parts of Canada, and had become so popular that on July 24, 1912 Agnes Baden-Powell created Lady Mary Pellatt "Chief Commissioner of the Dominion of Canada Girl Guides". Many Guide events were held at her home, Casa Loma, in Toronto. It is now a tourist attraction with a special Girl Guide display.

Guiding is now served by the Guiding in Canada - Ontario Council, with 44,000 girl members, 11,000 adults, 13 Areas and 37 camps throughout Ontario.

== 8th World Scout Jamboree ==
In 1955, the 8th World Scout Jamboree was held at Niagara-on-the-Lake, Ontario. This was the first World Jamboree to be held in the Western Hemisphere. The setting was a rolling parkland, and 11,000 Scouts attended this gathering, which was notable for the number of Scout contingents that crossed the Atlantic by air to attend—1,000 from Great Britain alone.

== Scout memorials ==
Scouting memorials include:

- E.T. Seton Park in Toronto, Ontario name for Ernest Thompson Seton the founding member of the Boy Scouts of America
- Historic plaque on the Trans Canada Trail at Sir Sandford Fleming College and Outdoor Education Centre in Lindsay, Ontario to mark E.T. Seton's residence in the town from 1866 to 1870.
- Commemorative for the 8th World Scout Jamboree in Niagara-on-the-Lake, Ontario where the 50th Anniversary Plaque and tree planted near Butler's Barracks.

== See also ==
Scouting and Guiding in Canada's provinces and territories
- Scouts Canada
- Girl Guides of Canada
- World Organization of the Scout Movement (WOSM)
- World Association of Girl Guides and Girl Scouts (WAGGGS)
