= Scouting and Guiding in Quebec =

Scouting in Quebec has a long history, from the 1900s to the present day, serving thousands of youth in programs that suit the environment in which they live.

== Anglophone Scouting in Quebec ==
Scouting and Guiding in Canada's provinces and territories

Quebec is administered by the Quebec Council of Scouts Canada, which includes the Quebec Rover Round Table.

=== Areas ===
Areas were eliminated as part of the Scouts Canada organizational structure in 2019, but the former Areas were:

- Abenaki Area
- Eastern (Montreal) Area
- Ohiyo Area
- Stoney Point Area
- West Island area
- Laval Larentians Area
- Chavalla Area
- St. Lawrence Cartierville Area
- Kebec Area
- St. Lawrence Appalachians Area
- Saguenay Lac St-Jean Area
- North Shore Area
- Gaspé Area.

=== Local Groups and sections ===
Among Quebec's varied Scouting groups are Scouts, Sea Scouts, Beavers, Cubs, Rovers and Venturers.

== Francophone Scouting in Quebec ==
=== WOSM member association ===
- Association des Scouts du Canada is the largest francophone association in Canada. Their head office is located in Montreal. Its 13,000+ members are divided into several districts depending on the regions where they are located. The district of "Scout du Montréal Métropolitain" is currently the largest one with over 3000 members.

=== UIGSE member associations ===
- Association Evangélique du Scoutisme au Québec
- Federation of North-American Explorers (FNE)

== Independent associations ==
There are also a number of independent Scouting associations active in Quebec. Among them are:

- Association des aventuriers de Baden-Powell (English: Adventurer Association of Baden-Powell), a bilingual association also active in several other provinces, ±1500 members
- Association de Scoutisme d'Actions

== Girl Guiding in Quebec ==

Guides are served by the Girl Guides of Canada (French: Guides du Canada).

Girl Guide Camp Peaceful Waters (formally Camp WaThikAne (pronounced wahtickani)) is situated on Lac Bouchette, 96 kilometres north of Montreal, near the town of Morin Heights, Quebec. In operation since 1926, Camp Peaceful Waters has 6 fully equipped campsites, 2 equipped pioneer campsites and a fully equipped (partially heated) lodge. The main camp area is suitable for day or overnight for any age group. All camp users have access to the large activity room in the lodge.

== Campsites ==
There are several active scout campsites in Quebec including Otter Lake Scout Camp in Otter Lake in the Outaouais region and Lake Lovering Scout Reserve in Magog.

There are several former scout campsites in Quebec that have closed, notably Camp Jackson-Dodds and Tamaracouta Scout Reserve. The latter had hosted the 11th Canadian Scout Jamboree in July 2007, with 10,000 campers. In 2018, it was temporarily closed then put up for sale in 2023.

== See also ==
- Association des Scouts du Canada
- Union Internationale des Guides et Scouts d'Europe
