= Rambler Badge =

Award of the Rovers section of Scouts Canada

- The Rambler Badge
- Owner: Scouts Canada
- Country: Canada
- Awarded for: Achievements
- Membership: Canadian Rovers

The Rambler Badge is an award of the Rovers section of Scouts Canada. It is one of the few Rover merit badges, and the highest non-yearly award a Rover can receive. Rovers can receive multiple Rambler Badges over time. The award is, and has been, used by the Rover sections of other Scout associations.

== See also ==
- List of highest awards in Scouting
