= Jackson Dodds =

British-Canadian banker (1881–1961)

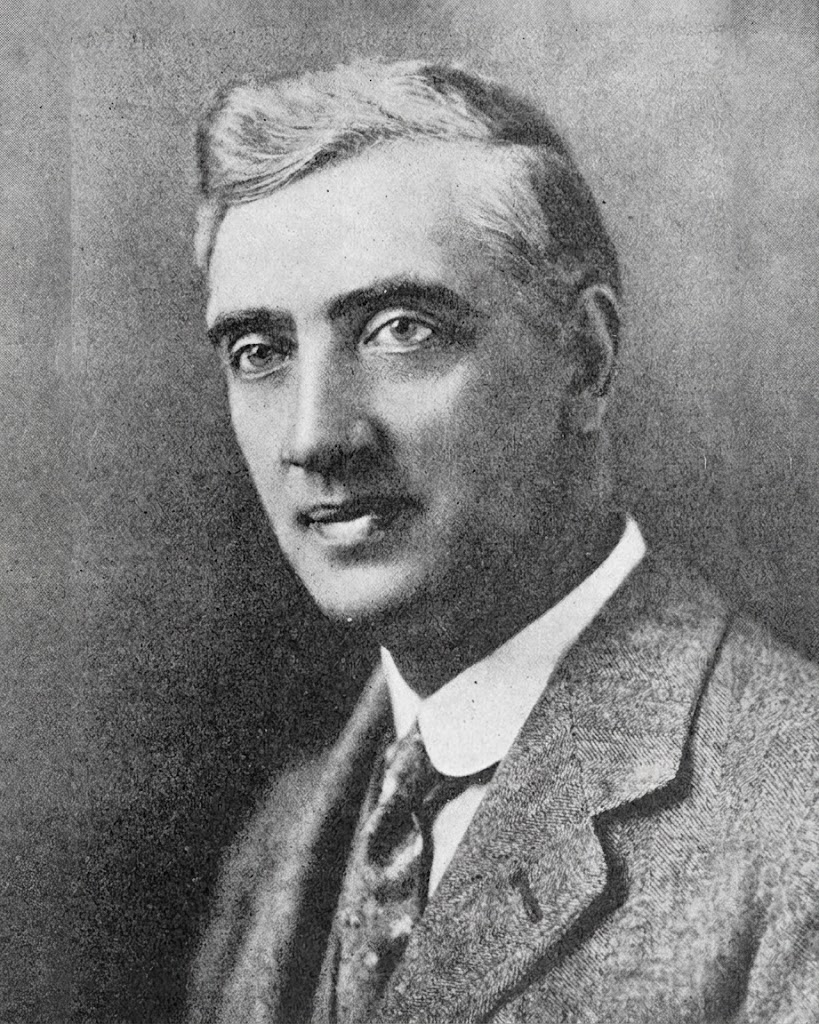
- Born: 16 February 1881; London, England
- Died: 7 April 1961 (aged 80); Montreal, Quebec
- Education: City of London School
- Spouse: Florence Lydia Wood (m. 1920)

Jackson Dodds CBE (16 February 1881 – 7 April 1961) was an early Scouts Canada Scouting notable, rising to Deputy Chief Scout for Canada.

Born in Hornsey, Middlesex, England, Dodds first went to Canada in 1901, and finally settled in Winnipeg, Manitoba, after serving with the British Army in World War I. He served on the World Scout Committee of the World Organization of the Scout Movement from 1947 until 1949 and again from 1951 until 1955.

== Background ==
Dodds was a strong swimmer and was on the Canadian national water polo team which competed in Saint Petersburg, Russia against the Russian team prior to their revolution. He was married to Florence Lydia Wood (1886-1949), a professional singer who sang under the name Roma. He was father to Roma, Donald, Stanley and Jean.

Dodds was awarded the tenth Bronze Wolf, the only distinction of the World Organization of the Scout Movement, awarded by the World Scout Committee for exceptional services to world scouting, in 1955.

He acted as the Camp Chief for the 8th World Scout Jamboree held at Niagara-on-the-Lake in August 1955.

In 1953 Dodds' affiliation and support of Scouting led to a summer camp for Cubs being named in his honour, Camp Jackson Dodds. It was located on Lac Cloutier, near Rawdon, Quebec. The Camp Jackson Dodds property was closed by Quebec Council in August 2005. They sold the land and used the money to build a Cub facility, also named Camp Jackson Dodds, on part of Tamaracouta Scout Reserve in the lower Laurentian Mountains of Quebec, south of Saint Sauveur.

Dodds had a distinguished career with the Bank of Montreal where he was General Manager before his retirement. Dodds' image appeared on the paper currency of the Bank of Montreal in 1931, 1935, and 1938 (during the time he was General Manager); the bank's $10 and $20 notes dated 2 January 1935 carry his portrait and signature alongside those of the bank's president, Sir Charles Gordon. In addition, he acted as a director of Bishop's College School.

Jackson died of cancer in Montreal on April 7, 1961.

== Awards ==
Dodds was awarded the following medals during his lifetime:

- CBE – Commander of the Most Excellent Order of the British Empire: 1 January 1944
- OBE – Officer of the Most Excellent Order of the British Empire: 3 June 1919
- 1914 Star: 1917
- British War Medal: 1914 - 1918
- Victory Medal: 1914 - 1919
- 1935 Jubilee Medal
- 1937 George VI Coronation Medal
- 1953 Queen Elizabeth Coronation Medal
- Order of the Phoenix – Greece
- Royal Order of George I – Greece

== See also ==
- List of Bishop's College School alumni
