= Maggie Shaddick =

- Margaret Elizabeth Anne Carrie

Assistant Provincial Commissioner for International Relationships of the Quebec Council of Scouts Canada

Personal details
- Born: 19 March 1926 Montreal, Quebec
- Died: 13 March 2019 (aged 92) Montreal, Quebec
- Spouse: Duncan Shaddick
- Children: Six

Margaret E. Shaddick (19 March 1926 – 13 March 2019) was a cub scout pack leader in both England and Canada. She was the first woman appointed as a district commissioner in Canada and later served as the assistant provincial commissioner for international relationships of the Quebec Council of Scouts Canada. Shaddick was awarded the 338th Bronze Wolf awarded by the World Scout Committee for exceptional services to world scouting.

== Early life and education ==
Margaret Elizabeth Anne Carrie, known as "Maggie" was born on 19 March 1926, in Montreal to Margaret M. (née Kilbourn) and Gideon Milroy "Roy" Carrie. Her father was a mining engineer who had served as a colonel in the Canadian forces during World War I. Both of her parents were originally from Owen Sound, Ontario. Maggie was the oldest daughter. She and her younger sister Joan lived with their parents in Montreal West for a time and then moved to Westmount, Quebec. Maggie completed her secondary education at Westmount High School and then moved with her parents to London, when her father was given a diplomatic post there after the end of World War II.

On 7 May 1949, Maggie married Bruce Hector Woodall at St Martin-in-the-Fields church at Trafalgar Square. She married for the second time on 28 February 1959, with William Thomas Duncan Shaddick at MacKay United Church in Ottawa. The couple made their home in Westmount and began raising their six children: Bob, Liz, Anne, Andrew, Patricia, and Pippa.

== Scouting ==
In the early 1960s, Shaddick became her son's Cub Scout pack leader and completed her training at Camp Tamaracouta at Mille-Isles. She had just begun to work as a scout leader when her husband was transferred to Banbury, Oxfordshire in 1965. They lived in Oxford for three years and while they were there, Shaddick took a course on scouting at the Baden-Powell House in London. She then took on a cub scout pack of 48 boys in Oxford.

In 1968, upon her return to Canada, Shaddick was asked to take up the post of acting district commissioner. Because the post had never been held by a woman, she remained the acting commissioner for over a year until her position was formally accepted. In 1970, she became the first woman appointed District Commissioner. She, then, played an important role on the international scene, in particular in assisting the rebirth and integration of scouting in the countries of Eastern Europe and the former Soviet Union. In 1992, she served as the assistant provincial commissioner for international relationships of the Quebec Council of Scouts Canada.

In 2012, Shaddick was awarded the 338th Bronze Wolf, the only distinction of the World Organization of the Scout Movement, awarded by the World Scout Committee for exceptional services to world scouting, only the fifth woman to receive the honor, and one of eight Canadians.

== Death and legacy ==
Shaddick died on 13 March 2019 in Montreal. She was remembered not only for her roles in scouting, but for her volunteerism in organizing the construction of schools and water delivery systems in Nepal and Africa. Concerned about HIV/AIDS, she created the Red Ribbon Scouting Badge to recognize those who were active in educational efforts to eradicate the disease. She also was remembered for developing cultural exchange programs with Inuit scouting participants.
