= Scouting and Guiding in Prince Edward Island =

Scouting in Prince Edward Island has a long history, from the 1900s to the present day, serving thousands of youth in programs that suit the environment in which they live.

== Anglophone Scouting in Prince Edward Island ==
Prince Edward Island is administered by the Prince Edward Island Council of Scouts Canada.

=== National Jamborees ===
- CJ'77, 1977: 4th Canadian Scout Jamboree, Cabot Beach Provincial Park, Prince Edward Island. 16,000 attend.
- CJ'89, 1989: 7th Canadian Scout Jamboree, Port-la-Joye–Fort Amherst, Prince Edward Island. 10,000 attend.
- CJ'01, 2001: 10th Canadian Scout Jamboree, Cabot Beach Provincial Park, Prince Edward Island. 14,000 attend.

=== Camps ===
- Camp Buchan (summer, fall, winter)

== Girl Guiding in Prince Edward Island ==

Guiding is served by the Guiding in Canada - Prince Edward Island Council.

Guiding started in Prince Edward Island in 1923.

Headquarters: Charlottetown
Website: http://www.girlguides.pe.ca/

Camps:

- Camp Fairhaven is 75 acres (30 ha) on the shores of the Murray river in the east part of the island.

== See also ==
Scouting and Guiding in Canada's provinces and territories
