= Medal of the Maple =

Scouts Canada award

- Country: Canada
- Created: 2007
- Founder: Scouts Canada
- Awarded for: Youth who have significantly contributed to the Movement and the spirit of Scouting.

The Medal of the Maple is a service award presented to youth members of Scouts Canada to honour those youth who have significantly contributed to the Movement and the spirit of Scouting through community service, extraordinary Scouting participation and a solid system of personal values. Currently it is the only service award presented solely to youth.

== Background ==
The Medal of the Maple was created in 2007 by the National Youth Network to celebrate the centennial of scouting in Canada. It is awarded annually to any number of youth that are accepted. Presentations are made by individual councils.

The award consists of 3 parts:

1. A certificate signed by the National Commissioner, National Youth Commissioner & Executive Commissioner and CEO of Scouts Canada
2. Cloth emblem
3. Medal on red and white striped emblem

== Nomination and criteria ==
In order to receive the medal, individuals are nominated by fellow members of Scouting. Nominators can be both youth and adult.

As specified on the Scouts Canada website nominees must:

1. Have been a registered member of scouting for no less than 3 years. Be either a Scout, Venturer, or Rover, though exceptions can be made for Beavers and Cubs.
2. Show outstanding leadership and teamwork capabilities in their area, group, council or national Scouting body.
3. Help organize, run or coordinate events that better their community, other Scouts and/or the Scouting Community at large.
4. Positively benefit other youth members as a direct result of their work, dedication and/or personal values.
5. Provide service and display a commitment that exceeds the faithful performance of the ordinary duties and expectations of a youth within their sections, groups, local councils or other pertinent Scouting associations and bodies.
