= CTSA =

CTSA may refer to:

- Canadian Traditional Scouting Association
- Cathepsin A is an enzyme which is classified both as a cathepsin and a carboxypeptidase.
- The Catholic Theological Society of America is a professional association of theologians that was founded in 1946 to promote studies and research in theology within the Catholic tradition.
- The Channel Tunnel Safety Authority, an international regulatory body responsible for safety in the Channel Tunnel.
- Claire Trevor School of the Arts
- The Clinical and Translational Science Award program administered by the U.S. National Institutes of Health.
- Cape Town, South Africa, the legislative capital of South Africa, also the oldest city of the country.
