= SCOUT eh! =

SCOUT eh!'s logo

SCOUT eh! is an organization of "registered Scouts Canada members dedicated to transforming Scouts Canada into a democratic association". The name is an acronym for "Scouts Canada Ordinary-member Unity Taskforce Association". SCOUT eh! was founded in August, 2004. As of September, 2006 it had over 700 members from every Scouts Canada council and Canadian province.

== Background ==
SCOUT eh! was formed in response to a restructuring within Scouts Canada leading to what its members considered to be a non democratic management structure.

In the late 1990s, Scouts Canada embarked on a restructuring process aimed at addressing the ongoing problem of membership decline. A team wrote what was officially known as the Millennium Report. The report described a dramatically more centralized and staff-directed structure for the association. The report was extremely unpopular with some portions of Scouts Canada's membership, especially those at the District level. Scouts Canada formally set aside the report, but continued work on restructuring.

In 2000, Scouts Canada replaced its General By-Law with By-Law No. 1. The amendments replaced the 52-member National Council with a 23-member Board of Governors and divided the membership into Ordinary Members, who have no voting rights; and Voting Members, a group of 100 or fewer people who elect the Board and vote on matters presented to the national Annual General Meeting.

2002 saw the implementation of restructuring. Scouts Canada passed By-Law No. 2 which replaced the Provincial, Regional, and District Councils with 20 new councils, comprising an entire province or a large part of a province. Councils are led by a Council Commissioner, appointed by Scouts Canada's volunteer Chief Commissioner. The Districts were transformed into Areas overseen by an Area Commissioner appointed by and accountable to the Council Commissioner. Scouts Canada's Ontario Incorporated Body, which is the trustee for most of the Scout camps in Ontario, began a property review process.

By 2004, dissatisfaction existed among some of Scouts Canada's membership. While some of the national leadership and staff considered the restructuring to be a success, some others at the local level objected to the changes and found the new system to be ineffective at helping Scouters deliver the program.

== Activities ==
The first SCOUT eh! gathering, referred to as CAMP eh! was held September 24–26, 2004 at Camp Timken near Iona in Ontario. Two-dozen Scouters including Scouters from Ontario, Quebec, and Newfoundland gathered to learn about the issues, discuss strategy, and draft a constitution for the association.

=== Camp sales campaign ===
The property review had become public knowledge and Scouters were worried about losing local camps. An information session at an April, 2004 Scouts Canada conference near Toronto did not reassure all the membership. In the middle of that summer, Scouts Canada produced a list of Scout camps they wanted to close. During this time some volunteers spearheaded the creation of a committee aimed at giving the disenfranchised membership direct management of the management and direction of Scouts Canada.

=== Financial concerns ===
SCOUT eh! has been a watchdog for Scouts Canada's finances. In 2006 it published that due to a claimed fall in members, financial issues and "top-heavy management", Scouts Canada may not have been able to last much past the summer 2007 centennial celebrations. In 2007 it expressed concerns that Scouts Canada faced potential bankruptcy due to a $6-million unfunded pension liability. Scouts Canada denied the claims.

=== Bill S-1001, The Scouts Canada Act campaign ===
In September 2006, SCOUT eh! announced it had surpassed 700 members nationally. During 2006 SCOUT eh! campaigned against Bill S-1001, The Scouts Canada Act. On Monday, December 4, 2006, SCOUT eh! made their case to the Standing Senate Committee on Legal and Constitutional Affairs. In 2007 SCOUT eh! petitioned the government, arguing that;

- The membership of Scouts Canada had not been consulted on the Bill,
- Information about the Bill had not made available to the membership,
- That "the Bill will make fundamental that are changes contrary to the underlying principles governing Scouting and will adversely affect the rights heretofore enjoyed by members of the Boy Scouts of Canada and will be to the detriment of the membership".

=== Scouts Canada Policy 1014 campaign ===
In 2007, Scouts Canada announced Policy 1014 which requires that each council's Voting Members be elected by representatives of the council, and its areas and groups. While it acknowledged that the system is an improvement, SCOUT eh! criticized the policy because:

- Most members of voting age are still not allowed to vote
- Votes are distributed in an unequal manner which favors councils, areas, and small groups
- Ordinary Members remain many levels removed from the decision-making process of the Board of Governors, resulting in mis-communication

=== Haliburton campaign ===
In 2009 a campaign was launched against the sale of part of the Haliburton Scout Reserve, a 20 square kilometre (5000 acre) Scout camp located east of Haliburton, Ontario described as Canada's largest Scout Camp. The organisation formed an online campaign against the sale of a 100-acre parcel of land for $1.3 million.
