= Shaddick =

Shaddick is a surname. Notable people with the surname include:

- Maggie Shaddick (1926–2019)
- Rowland Shaddick (1920–1994), English cricketer
