= Scouting and Guiding in Alberta =

Scouting and Guiding in Alberta has a long history, from the 1900s to the present day, serving thousands of youth in programs that suit the environment in which they live.

== Scouting ==
Alberta branch of the Association des Scouts du Canada

Alberta Scouting is administered by two Councils within Scouts Canada: Northern Lights Council in the north (also responsible for the Northwest Territories), and Chinook Council in the south. In general, each council's territory is divided into Areas, and each Area contains sponsored Scouting Groups.

Francophone Scouting groups exist in Calgary and in Edmonton. They are part of the Association des Scouts du Canada.

In 1983, the 15th World Scout Jamboree was held at Kananaskis Country, an area of Provincial Park 4,000 feet in the foothills of the Rocky Mountains, 80 miles west of Calgary, Alberta. The Spirit Lives On was the theme of the World Jamboree, with a total attendance of over 15,000 Scouts from nearly 100 countries. In 2010 Northern Lights Council introduced a centennial badge commemorating 100 years of scouting in the area.

=== Local Groups and sections ===
Among Alberta's varied Scouting groups and sections are Adventure Scouting Groups, Ismaili Scouts, and Rover Crews with romantic names like Knights of Dionysus and Knights of the Crimson Cross. In 2009 a Special Needs group, the 88th Polaris, was formed in the Northern Lights Council serving youth with neurological impairments.

=== Major Scouting events held in Alberta ===
In 1981, the 5th Canadian Scout Jamboree was held at Kananaskis, Alberta, with 19,000 in attendance.

In 1993, the 8th Canadian Scout Jamboree was held at Kananaskis, Alberta, with 12,000 in attendance.

In 2005, Northern Lights Council hosted a jamboree at Camp Woods. Chinook Council hosted a joint Alberta-Saskatchewan Brotherhood Jamboree at Camp Impeesa, celebrating the common centennial of the two provinces.

On June 19, 2010 it was announced at the Northern Lights Council Annual Honours and Awards ceremonies, that Camp Woods, near Sylvan Lake, Alberta, would be the location for the 12th Canadian Scout Jamboree to be held in the summer of 2013. Plans currently call for an attendance of 6,000.

From May 1–3, 2015 the 20th Fort Edmonton Scout Camp will be held at Fort Edmonton Park in Edmonton. This is the 20th year this camp is being held at the Fort and features activities themed around the historic time periods portrayed at Fort Edmonton Park. (see also www.fortedcamp.com)

=== Camp Impeesa ===
Camp Impeesa is Scouts Canada’s high adventure mountain and wilderness experience centre and residential summer camp. Camp Impeesa is located in the Castle Wilderness area in the Rocky Mountains, near Pincher Creek, Alberta.

Camp Impeesa was first founded during the late 1960s with the idea of having a base camp from Scouts to take backpacking trips in the southern Canadian rockies. During the 1970s, the camp became a residential program for Cubs and Scouts.

In 2001, Mike Bingley and other interested Scouters began the process of developing a high adventure camping program at Camp Impeesa. With the help of a dedicated team from around the world, this program became Impeesa Extreme. The program was launched in 2003 with six patrols from as far away as New York City and Chicago. The first summer included the additional challenges of forest fires, including the Okanagan Mountain Fire and Lost Creek Fire which forced the program to move five times.

2004 saw the program triple in size, partially due to word of mouth advertising and the cancellation of the 2004 Saskatchewan Jamboree. 2004 was the last year that Mike Bingley was involved with the program.

Major upgrades were made to the camp in 2014 and 2015, with the installation of a new zip line, a new climbing tower, high ropes and low ropes courses, and other upgrades.

Activities focus on scouting adventure and skill development based on Scout Canada's Canadian Path. Summer camps are open to non-Scouts as well. Camp facilities and activities include a zip Line; climbing tower & bouldering wall; high and low ropes course; team building & portable elements programs; Table Mountain summit hike, other day hikes and backpacking trips; compass, orienteering, and GPS; survival skills programs; canoeing, kayaking, and aquatics; archery and tomahawks; pioneering skills; ThunderBall pit & volleyball; wide games & campfire program; nature programs; pond exploration; and mountain biking and top rope climbing.

== Girl Guiding ==

Alberta Provincial Council - Guides of Canada is the provincial council of Girl Guides of Canada-Guides du Canada, which is geographically made up of the Canadian provinces and territories of Alberta, Northwest Territories and Yukon. The provincial council's headquarters is located in Edmonton

=== Areas ===
Alberta Council is divided into the following twelve areas:

- Calgary Area (Calgary and vicinity))
- Chinook Area (the south eastern part of Alberta covering area from the Rocky Mountain to Grassy Lake on the east and from the US to Claresholm on the north)
- Cypress Hills Area (Medicine Hat and vicinity)
- Edmonton Area (central Edmonton and the former Guiding areas of Arrowhead Area and Northern Lights Area)
- Michener Area
- Parkland Area (Red Deer and vicinity)
- Peace River Area
- Prairie Rose Area
- Tamarac Area (north of Edmonton)
- Woodsmoke Area
- Yukon Area (Whitehorse and Watson Lake)
- NT Area (Fort Simpson, Hay River, Inuvik, Norman Wells, and Yellowknife)

=== Camps ===
- Camp Jubilee in the Calgary Area
- Westover in the Calgary Area
- IASG in the Calgary Area
- Camp Mockingbird in the Calgary Area
- Guide/Scout Hall in Banff
- Camp Okeekun in Chinook Area
- Elkwater Camp in Cypress Hills Area
- Sandy Lake Beach in Edmonton Area is located on Sandy Lake 60 km northwest of Edmonton
- Tangletrees in Edmonton Area is located on Pigeon Lake some 85 km southwest of Edmonton. It was acquired in 1943.
- Williams Wilderness in Edmonton Area is a zero impact campsite donated in 1969.

== See also ==
Scouting and Guiding in Canada's provinces and territories
- Scouting in Montana
