= Scouting and Guiding in New Brunswick =

Scouting in New Brunswick has a long history, from the 1900s to the present day, serving thousands of youth in programs that suit the environment in which they live.

== Anglophone Scouting in New Brunswick ==
New Brunswick is administered by the New Brunswick Council of Scouts Canada. The New Brunswick Council has been directly involved with Kenya's Extension Scouting program (previously known as the Street Scouts program, active in Kenya, eastern Uganda and northern Tanzania) for a number of years.

=== Local Areas ===
The Areas in New Brunswick are Southeast NB Service Area, Wabanaki Service Area, Riverton Service Area, Chaleur Service Area, Fundy East Service Area, and Wabanaki Area.

== Girl Guiding in New Brunswick ==

Guides are served by the Guiding in Canada - New Brunswick Council.

Headquarters: Saint John, NB
Website: http://www.girlguides.nb.ca/

New Brunswick Council is divided into 6 areas

- Coastal Shore in northeastern New Brunswick
- Kennebecasis in central south New Brunswick
- Mawiw in central New Brunswick
- Tidewater in southeastern New Brunswick
- Upper Saint John River Valley in western New Brunswick
- Water's Edge in southern New Brunswick

Camps:

- Camp Chacik is 41 acres (170,000 m^{2}) near Kingston, NB in the Kennebecasis area. It was acquired in 1993.
- Camp Chiplaquorgan is 20 acres (81,000 m^{2}) on the shores of Oromocto Lake in the Mawiw area. It was opened in 1963. The name means "the stick that holds the pot over the fire".
- Camp Wee Waa Zee Zuk in the Mawiw area
- Camp Nebooktook in the Tidewater area. The name is Mi'Kmaq meaning "Little camp/cabin in the woods".
- Camp Whisong is 40 acres (160,000 m^{2}) in the Tidewater area
- Camp Etalacimuk in the Upper Saint John River Valley area
- Comp Oswego in the Water's Edge are

Camp Wegwamageek was a 150-acre (0.61 km^{2}) site in the Tidewater area. It was acquired in 1962. The name means "land's end" in Micmac. It was sold in 2010 to the Nature Conservancy of Canada.

== See also ==
Scouting and Guiding in Canada's provinces and territories
- Scouting in Maine
