= Scouting and Guiding in British Columbia =

Coordinates: 49°24′31.7″N 123°35′10.8″W

Scouting in British Columbia has a long history, from the 1900s to the present day, serving thousands of youth in programs that suit the environment in which they live.

== Anglophone Scouting in British Columbia ==
British Columbia Council

British Columbia is administratively connected to Yukon.

=== Councils ===
- Cascadia Council - Most of British Columbia and Vancouver Island
- Fraser Valley Council - Most of the Fraser Valley, Nicomekl Area, Three Rivers Area, Coho Area, West SurDel Area, Green Timbers Area, Fraser Cheam
- Pacific Coast Council - Pacific Spirit, East Vancouver, North Shore, Richmond, Burnaby. Whistler, the Sea to Sky corridor and the sunshine coast are administered through the Council office directly.

=== Local Groups and sections ===
In addition to typical groups, there are some vocational Company and Crews that serve special interests.

- The 180th Pacific Coast Rover Scouts are a Leadership and Project Management Crew based in the Lower Mainland.
- 89th Richmond Medvents
- 24th Fraser Valley Medvents
- Fraser Valley SCUBAvents

The Silver Walnut Award was created by youth in 2005 to recognize outstanding youth leadership outside their own section. The first silver walnuts were presented in April 2006 in British Columbia's Cascadia Council. This award was created by the Cascadia Youth Network and has been approved by the National Council for use on youth uniforms. The award was since nationalized as the Medal of the Maple- a youth award for all councils.

=== Pacific Jamboree ===
The Pacific Jamboree or PJ, is a jamboree hosted by BC-Yukon Councils, it is typically held every four years rotating between Camp Byng, Camp Barnard, and Camp Hughes. Participation is open to all youth of Scout age who are registered members of Scouts. PJ 2019 at Camp Barnard had approximately 2,600 attendees.

Year	Location	Name
1966	Camp Ponderosa	British Columbia - Yukon Adventure Jamboree
1974	Camp Barnard	British Columbia & Yukon Jamboree of Challenge
1979	Douglas Lake Ranch	British Columbia & Yukon Scout Adventure Jamboree, Big Country
1983	Camp Barnard	B.C. Yukon Jamboree of the Pacific
1987	Camp Barnard	British Columbia - Yukon Jamboree, Adventure
1991	Camp Hughes	B.C. - Yukon Jamboree, Exploration
1995	Camp Hughes	British Columbia - Yukon, Frontier
1999	Camp Byng	
2003	Camp Byng	BC - Yukon, Pacific Challenge
2007	Camp Byng	Pacific Jamboree, 100 Years of Adventures
2011	Camp Byng	Pacific Jamboree, Quest for the Rings
2015	Camp Barnard	Pacific Jamboree, Salish Sea Adventures
2019	Camp Barnard	Pacific Jamboree, Myths and Legends
2024	Camp Barnard	Pacific Jamboree, PJ Explores the World
2028	Camp Barnard	

=== Camp Byng ===
Camp Byng is a 208-acre (0.84 km^{2}) Scouts Canada camping facility located in Roberts Creek on the Sunshine Coast, a 40-minute ferry ride from Horseshoe Bay Terminal, Vancouver, British Columbia. The facility was host of the British Columbia Provincial Jamboree 2007, also known as the Pacific Jamboree. Camp Byng has hosted the 2011 Pacific Jamboree on July 9 to July 16, 2011. Over 3,200 participants and volunteers attended.

The facility has over a mile of oceanfront property, archery range, two playing fields, high and low ropes course with a zip line, four lodges with indoor cooking facilities as well as wilderness campsites. Outdoor showers are provided throughout the site.

=== Camp Barnard ===
Camp Barnard is a 250-acre (1.01 km^{2}) Scouts Canada camping facility located in Otter Point, just west of Sooke on Vancouver Island. The site is centered around 17-acre Young Lake and was host of the Pacific Jamboree (PJ) in 1974, 1983, 1987, 2015, 2019 and 2024.

The facility has a swimming area, dock, boat house with canoes and kayaks, archery range, two Lodges, four cabin circles and a playing field.

== Francophone Scouting in British Columbia ==
British Columbia District (Association des Scouts du Canada)

The first Association des Scouts du Canada Wolf Cub (Louveteaux) pack was formed in 1955 in Maillardville. A second pack followed in 1956 in the same town. In 1957, the first group of Scouts (Éclaireurs) was formed.

== Girl Guiding in British Columbia ==
British Columbia Council

Girl Guides are served by the British Columbia Council of Girl Guides of Canada.

=== SOAR ===
SOAR stands for Spirit of Adventure Rendezvous. It is held every three years in British Columbia for Girl Guides of all levels from all over Canada and abroad.

SOAR 2011 was held in Agassiz, British Columbia, from July 23–30, 2011.

Agassiz is a friendly agricultural community situated in the rich alluvial floodplain of the Fraser Valley. It is located on the north bank of the Fraser River, southwest of Hope, east of Vancouver, and south of Harrison Hot Springs. It features a host of outdoor activities, cultural events, historical sites, and museums. SOAR will be located on the Agricultural Fairgrounds also known as Centennial Park.

SOAR 2007 was held between July 20–28, 2007 at the Seven Springs Camp and Retreat Centre near Parksville. The camp's theme was Mysteries of the Sea.

SOAR 2004 opened on 2004-07-24. It was held in Merritt at the Merritt Mountain Music Festival site and 2,700 girls and leaders attended.

=== Ranger Advisory Council ===
British Columbian Rangers (Guides aged 15–18+) elect an advisory council each year. This occurs after their Annual General Meeting, which is held at their annual spring training and camp. This training, the Ranger RACket, is open to Rangers across British Columbia and their travel is subsidized by the British Columbia Council of Girl Guides of Canada. Five girls are elected each year and produce newsletter and plan the next Ranger RACket. In 2009, the event was renamed to reflect changes in the Canadian Girl Guiding program. Previously, the event was open to all members of the Senior Branches and was known as CAJURA (to stand for Cadets, Junior Leaders, and Rangers).

== See also ==
Scouting and Guiding in Canada's provinces and territories
- Baden-Powell Trail
- Scouting in Alaska
- Scouting in Idaho
- Scouting in Montana
- Scouting in Washington
- Scouting in Wisconsin
