= Stanley Lovell =

Canadian businessman and philanthropist (1927–2010)

Stanley Edwin Lovell
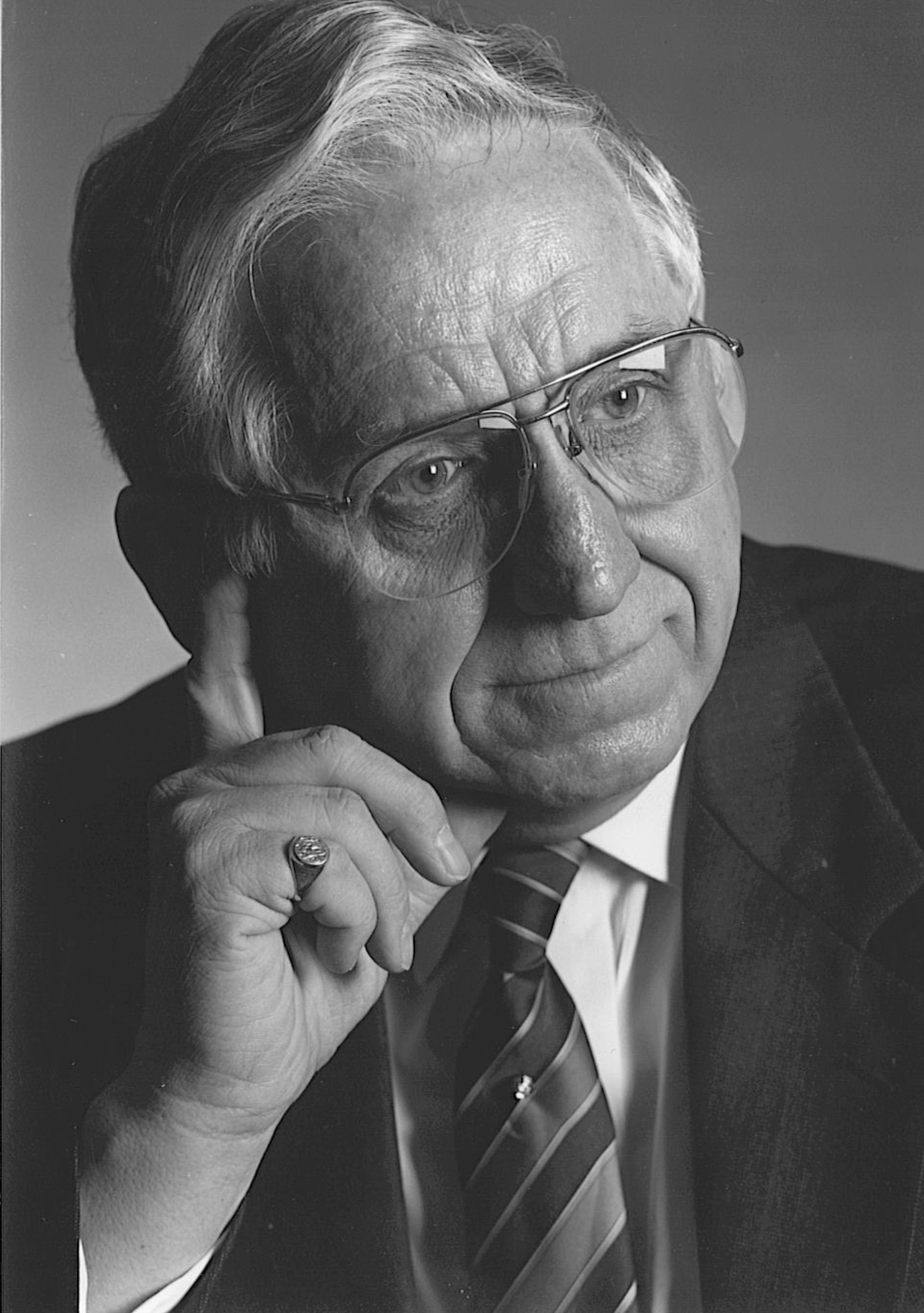
- Stanley Lovell circa 1997
- Born: January 26, 1927; Oshawa, Ontario, Canada
- Died: June 27, 2010 (aged 83); Oshawa, Ontario, Canada
- Education: University of Toronto
- Occupation: Businessperson
- Known for: President and CEO of Lovell Drugs (1971-2000)
- Spouse: Wilma Curtie Down Lovell
- Children: 3 (Diana, Arthur, Linda)

Stanley Edwin Lovell (January 26, 1927 - June 27, 2010) was a prominent businessperson and philanthropist of Oshawa, Ontario, Canada.

== Early life and education ==
Stanley Lovell was the second generation owner of Lovell Drugs succeeding his father, Edwin Arthur Lovell, and brother Everett Arthur Lovell. The Lovell family's involvement in the drug store business began in 1909 and expansion to multiple locations in Eastern Ontario followed.

Stanley Lovell graduated from the University of Toronto in 1947.

== Career ==
Stanley Lovell joined the family business in 1947 becoming President of Lovell Drugs in 1971 until his retirement in 2000.

His children, Arthur Lovell and Diana Lovell Kirk took over the family business through the third generation making Lovell Drugs the oldest, independent drug store chain in Ontario.

== Philanthropy ==
Stanley Lovell and family have a long history of commitment to financially supporting and contributing to growth in the Oshawa community including a large charitable contribution to the Capital Campaign for the University of Ontario Institute of Technology in 2006.

Education initiatives:

- Trustee of the Oshawa Board of Education from 1962-1969 serving as chairman in 1966 and 1967.
- First chairman of the Ontario County Board of Education from 1969-1970.
- Member of the Durham College board of governors from 1968-1976.

Scouting:

- President of the Oshawa Scouts Association from 1961-1962.
- President of the Scouting and Guiding in Ontario Provincial Council for Ontario from 1972-1974.
- Vice-President of the National Scouts Association in 1973-1976.
- The Scout Association Silver Acorn Award recipient in 1960.
- Silver Wolf Award (The Scout Association) recipient in 1977.

Health Care:

- Member of the Oshawa General Hospital board of governors from 1958. The Chairman of the Oshawa General Hospital board of governors from 1971-1976 and made a Life Governor of the Oshawa General Hospital in 1989.
- Member of the board of directors of the Ontario Hospital Association 1976-1986.

== Recognition ==
Lovell was the recipient of:

- Queen Elizabeth II Golden Jubilee Medal in 2002.
- 125th Anniversary of the Confederation of Canada Medal in 1992.
- Queen Elizabeth II Silver Jubilee Medal in 1977.
- The Scout Association Silver Wolf Award (The Scout Association) in 1977.
- Oshawa Walk of Fame inductee in 2016 alongside Stephen Poloz.,

== Personal life ==
Stanley Lovell was married to Wilma Curtie Down Lovell for 59 years and they had three children, Diana, Arthur, and Linda, that reside in Oshawa, Ontario.
