= Scouting and Guiding in Nova Scotia =

Scouting in Nova Scotia has a long history, from 1908 to the present day. There is early record of Boys' Brigade scouts, Canadian Boy Scouts and Salvation Army's Life-Saving Scouts in Nova Scotia. Scouting in Nova Scotia is currently conducted by local Scout groups and various associations including Scouts Canada, L'Association des Scouts du Canada and Canadian Federation of Independent Scouts affiliates such as BPSA - Nova Scotia.

Several scout associations in Canada trace their roots to the Baden-Powell Scouts in the United Kingdom. They form the Canadian Federation of Independent Scouts, which is a member of the World Federation of Independent Scouts.

The 4th Halifax Highland Scouts, formed in 1922 by The Scots Society (then the North British Society of Halifax), was the largest Scout group in Nova Scotia for several decades. The society's scouts became known as "The Scots Highland Scouts". The society registered its scouts with The Boy Scouts Association's Canadian General Council, now named Scouts Canada but in 2001, it ceased registration and continued its scouts independently under the name The Scots Highland Company, for male youths, until 2007, after which the society re-organized it as The Scots Highland Company 848, Royal Canadian Army Cadets.

== Nova Scotia Council ==

=== Camp sites ===
Northern

- Camp Carter (Cape Breton Region)
- Cameron Lake (Antigonish)
- Camp Roderick (Pictou)
- Camp Smith (Pictou)

Central

- Camp Malagash (Colchester)
- Stewiacke River Park (Colchester)
- Simpson's Lake (Springhill Groups)
- Shields Lake Camp (West Hants)
- Camp Nedooae (Provincial Council)
- Camp Impeeza (Tri-County)
- Camp Harris (Dartmouth Region)
- Camp Lone Cloud (Halifax Region)
- Harold T Barrett "Fun Forest" Lodge (2nd Beaver Bank - Cobequid Lakes)
- Lake Pleasant (Parrsboro Group)
- Scout Island (St. Margarets Bay)

South West

- Camp Mush-a-Mush (Lunenburg)
- Green Field Camp (Queens)
- Ten Mile Camp (Queens)
- Beverdam Lake (Shelburne)
- Pierce Park (Yarmouth)

Valley

- Don Brown Memorial (Digby District)
- Connell Lake Camp (Annapolis)
- Sunken Lake (Wofville Group)
- Camp Hiawatha (Kings)
- Camp Henry ({Demolished} 1st Canning)

== Girl Guiding in Nova Scotia ==

Girl Guides of Canada - Guides du Canada operates in Nova Scotia through its Nova Scotia Council. Headquarters: Halifax, NS
Website: http://www.girlguides.ns.ca/

Girl Guiding started in Nova Scotia in 1911 when the first company was organized in Halifax by suffragette Mary Walcott Ritchie (sister of Eliza Ritchie). Over the next years various companies were formed. In 1922 the Nova Scotia Council was incorporated.

Areas

- Ceilidh Area (Cape Breton)
- Dartmouth Shore Area (Dartmouth, East Preston, Eastern Passage, Porters Lake, Musquodoboit Harbour)
- Harbourside Area (Halifax)
- Harvest Trail Area (Annapolis Valley, South Shore, Western Shore)
- Maplewood Area (Colchester, Cumberland, Pictou, New Glasgow, Antigonish, Guysborough)
- Tri-Waters (Bedford, Fall River, Sackville, Beaverbank)

=== Camps ===
- Camp Cairdeas near Melford
- Camp Cumberland near Middleboro
- Camp Kana'da near West Petpeswick
- Lewis Lake near Upper Sackville
- Camp WoHeLo near Bridgewater
- Bridgewater Cabin near Bridgewater
- Hardwood Lake near Lake Paul

www.girlguides.ns.ca
