= Camp Opemikon =

- Interactive map of Camp Opemikon
- Location: Christie Lake, Maberly, Ontario, Canada
- Nearest city: Perth, Ontario
- Coordinates: 44°46′43″N 76°28′08″W
- Area: 200 acres (0.81 km^{2})
- Established: 1938
- Governing body: Scouts Canada

Camp Opemikon is owned and operated by Scouts Canada, Voyageur Council. Camp Opemikon is located on the southern tip of Christie Lake, 100 km southwest of Ottawa. The camp sits on more than 200 acres (0.81 km^{2}) of rugged terrain, situated among three pristine lakes.

== History ==
Purchased in 1937, opened in 1938. The bell in camp has been there since its opening and is still used today. Just before World War II the dining hall was started to be built and that hall would service the camp for 35 years, much of the materials used was from the old Mcmanus farmhouse, which used to stand in the orchard. The name "Opemikon" was adopted after consulting an expert on Native Indian lore. Ope - by the way or near to"; Miikan - "Road or Trail". For a literal Translation of beside the trail. - the trail being Hanna side road.

== Opemikon Rover Crew ==
In October 1959 the Opemikon Rover Crew was formed under the joint leadership of R.H. (Buster) Crabbe and Homer Last, and had six members. That fall it catered to and supervised the work of what became the first of many work weekends. In January 1960 the crew operated the first winter weekend at camp. Every winter since then the Crew has operated the winter camp. It is estimated that more than 15 thousand youth and leaders have attended winter camp at Camp Opemikon and were catered to by the crew.

In addition to providing the catering at winter camp the Crew has:

- Catered to most of the weekend Woodbadge courses held in the region since 1961.
- Catered most of the Eastern Ontario Gilwell Reunion weekends held since 1962.
- Catered many large and small groups who have camped at Opemikon in the spring and fall, as well as catering many weekend work groups.
- Landscaped the immediate area around the dining hall when it was constructed in 1974 and most of the remaining core area.
- Landscaped The Chapel when it was first constructed.
- Developed a number of patrol sites in the orchard.
- Undertaken many other maintenance activities around the camp such as tree and brush clearing, grass cutting, road repair, placing sod and many others.

== See also ==
- Scouting in Ontario
