= Canadian Scout Jamboree =

Canadian large-scale youth event

11th Canadian Scout Jamboree
- Location: Tamaracouta Scout Reserve
- Country: Canada
- Date: 2007-07-25 - 2007-08-01
- Attendance: 8000

The Canadian Scout Jamboree or CJ is a jamboree run by Scouts Canada for members of the Scout and Venturer sections. The Jamboree also includes groups from other countries attending, most notably from the United States.

== History ==
Year	Event	Location	Attendance
1949	1st Canadian Scout Jamboree	Connaught Ranges, Ottawa, Ontario	2,579
1953	2nd Canadian Scout Jamboree	Connaught Ranges, Ottawa, Ontario	1,196
1961	3rd Canadian Scout Jamboree	Connaught Ranges, Ottawa, Ontario	2,095
1977	4th Canadian Scout Jamboree	Cabot Beach Provincial Park, Prince Edward Island	16,000
1981	5th Canadian Scout Jamboree	Kananaskis, Alberta	19,000
1985	6th Canadian Scout Jamboree	Guelph Lake Conservation Area, Guelph, Ontario	12,000
1989	7th Canadian Scout Jamboree	Port-la-Joye—Fort Amherst, Prince Edward Island	10,000
1993	8th Canadian Scout Jamboree	Kananaskis, Alberta	12,000
1997	9th Canadian Scout Jamboree	Boulevard Lake Park, Thunder Bay, Ontario	13,879
2001	10th Canadian Scout Jamboree	Cabot Beach Provincial Park, Prince Edward Island	14,000
2007	11th Canadian Scout Jamboree	Tamaracouta Scout Reserve, Quebec	7,000
2013	12th Canadian Scout Jamboree	Camp Woods, Sylvan Lake, Alberta	7,000
2017	13th Canadian Scout Jamboree	Camp Nedooae, Nova Scotia	5,500

== CJ'07 ==
(CJ'07) of Scouts Canada was held from July 25 to August 1, 2007, at Tamaracouta Scout Reserve just north of Montreal. Nearly 8000 Scouts and Scout leaders from around the world attended the event.

Ten Street Scouts from the Kenya Scouts Association (KSA) attended the jamboree. Scouts Canada has helped the KSA run the Extension Scouting Program, commonly called the Street Scouts, for several years. CJ'07 was the first CJ held at a Scout camp.

=== Program ===
The program at CJ'07 included portions on land, water and sky. Some of the events included dragon boat racing, zip lines, gun run, Mud Mania (an event put on by the 31st Rovers of London Ont.), hiking, biking, wilderness cooking, and others.

On August 1 there was a sunrise ceremony commemorating the first 100 years of Scouting. This sunrise ceremony was done all over the world at sunrise local time.

The main section of the camp is the X-Centre, where Scouts were able to participate in badge trading and wide games, as well as buy souvenirs, food and drink at the Trading Post.

The event's radio station, CJAM, broadcast on 102.5 FM. Jamboree participants contributed to the programs broadcast as hosts, DJs and interviewers. This is the first Canadian Scout Jamboree to have an on-site radio station.

=== Mascot ===
The jamboree's mascot is a porcupine called Toucs. He is depicted in a cartoon style with blue spines and is wearing a scout uniform of shorts, shirt, neckerchief with woggle, along with wristband, sandals, sun visor and sunglasses.

=== Food ===
The youth participants and their leaders were fed on a meal plan which followed Canada's Food Guide. There was an emphasis on the serving of vegetables, facilitated through the mass distribution of heads of lettuce.

At the end of the Jamboree, all un-eaten non-perishable food was donated to local food banks.

=== Fort Amherst ===
Fort Amherst (the Venturer subcamp) had an attendance of 974 Venturers/Advisors and was run by a staff of 26 Rovers. It was the only subcamp that was 'for youth, by youth'. The Fort Amherst subcamp was named after the location of CJ'89 which was held at Port-la-Joye–Fort Amherst National Historic Site of Canada in Prince Edward Island.

Venturer registration for CJ07 was greater than anticipated. Fort Amherst's location was moved further up the hill. The south end of the Subcamp was nicknamed "Heart Attack Hill" by the campers. This hill was extremely steep, and contained many large rocks, stumps and tree roots, making the climb up and down very dangerous, especially at night. Sudo rope handrails and solar garden lights were installed to make the climb easier.

A side effect of the greater than anticipated registration was not being able to clear enough campsites in time. This led to the occupation of the VIP lot (field) by numerous Venturer Companies. Staff attempted to call this area Lower Fort Amherst but the campers preferred to be called Venturers In Parking lot.

The subcamp hosted many events for the Venturers, including dances, Hockey Night at the Jamboree, an open stage night, life-sized board games, and a movie night, which although it was planned to last all night, ended at 2:30am when they ran out of gas for the generator. The movies shown were Strange Brew, Talladega Nights, and half of Monty Python and the Holy Grail. It was reported that the movies could be heard up to two kilometers away in the staff parking lot.

During the subcamp's sunrise ceremony the Fort Amherst Rover Crew was formed. The crew is already planning bi-annual reunion camps.

The Quebec Council is working on naming one of the newly created trails "Rover Way". The Fort Amherst Gateway is to remain in place to honor those Rovers & Venturers who helped create what is to become one of the better campsites of the new Tamracouta Scout Reserve.

=== Connaught Ranges ===
Connaught Ranges was one of the smaller sub camps at the jamboree, with about 600 participants within its boundaries. The camp sites were in wooded areas and, as put by many of the campers they were " Boardwalk and Park Place on the CJ board". The Main Field; which had no grass, but only dust was where the general hub of activities took place including food collection, event nights and registrations.

Connaught Ranges had many different activities each night including silkscreening and an "Ironman" night where both youth and leaders alike participated in events such as sumo wrestling and drag racing.

Connaught Ranges was named for the location of the first CJ in Canadian History(1949) in Ottawa, Ontario.

The Canadian production company Chetwynd Films shot two films about Jamborees at the Connaught Ranges: Jamboree of Achievement (1953) and Jamboree Diary (1961).

== See also ==
- 21st World Scout Jamboree
