= Cabot Beach Provincial Park =

Provincial park in Prince Edward Island, Canada

Coordinates: 46°33′26.1″N 63°42′15.3″W

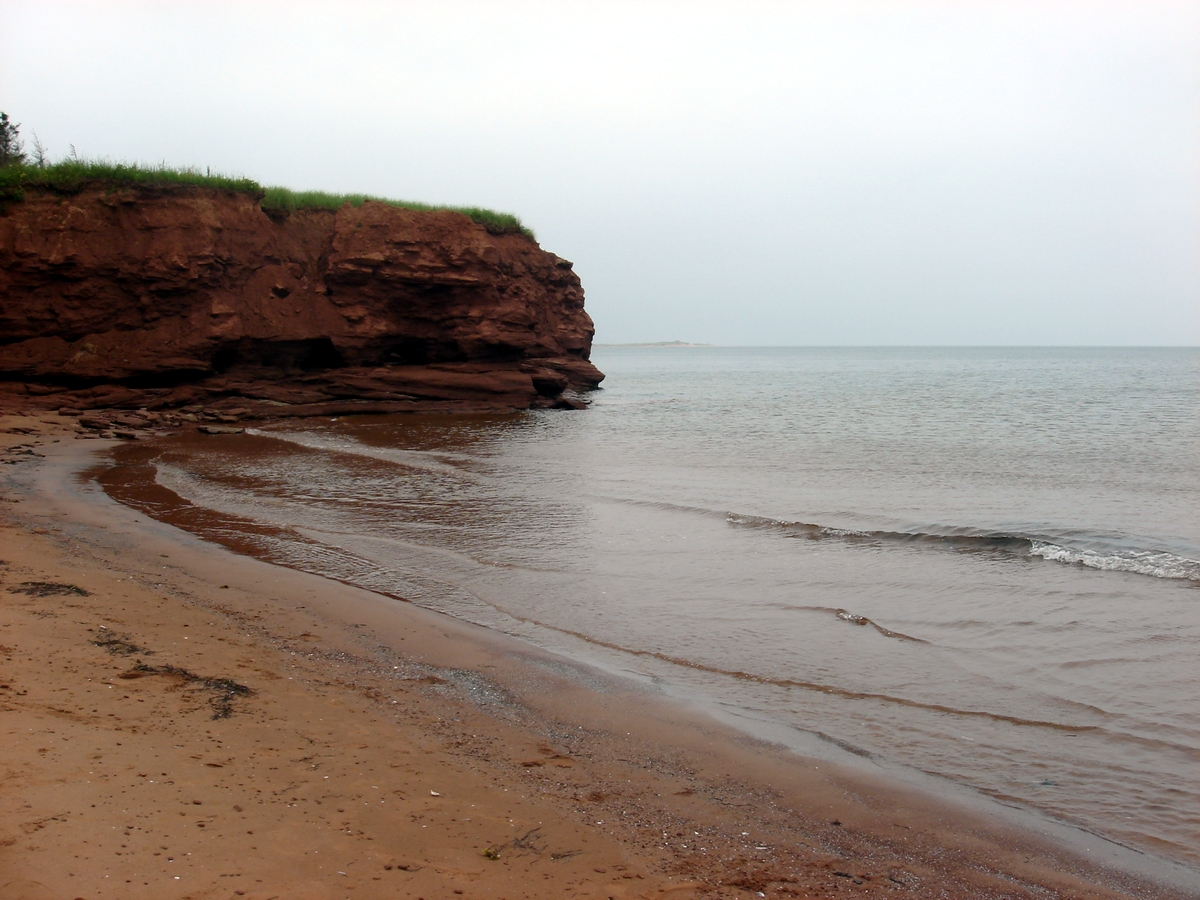
Red sandstone formations in Cabot Beach Provincial Park

Cabot Beach Provincial Park is a provincial park in Prince Edward Island, Canada. It is located in Malpeque Bay.

Cabot Beach is the largest park in western Prince Edward Island. The park has a large day-use area with playground equipment, an activity centre with children's programs and a naturalist on staff who provides guided nature walks. There is also supervised swimming on Malpeque Bay.

Cabot Beach was host to the 4th (1977) and the 10th (2001) Canadian Scout Jamboree.
