= 8th World Scout Jamboree =

- Location: Niagara-on-the-Lake, Ontario
- Country: Canada
- Date: August 1955
- Attendance: 11,000 Scouts
Previous; 7th World Scout Jamboree	Next; 9th World Scout Jamboree
- Website http://wj55.org/

The 8th World Scout Jamboree (French: Jamboree mondial) was held in August 1955, it was hosted by Canada at Niagara-on-the-Lake, Ontario. The Jamboree saw the introduction of the World Membership Badge which is still worn on the uniforms of Scouts worldwide.

This was the first World Jamboree to be held in the Western Hemisphere, and the first outside of Europe.

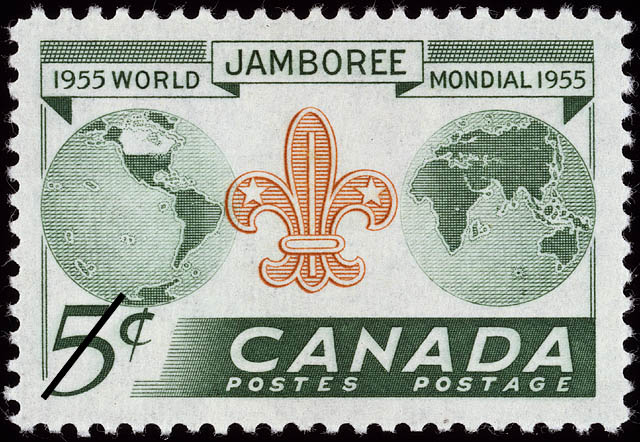
The Jamboree was heralded by a commemorative stamp issued in 1955.

The setting was a rolling parkland on the Commons of Fort George National Historic Site. More than 11,000 Scouts from 71 countries and colonies attended this gathering, which was notable for the number of Scout contingents that crossed the Atlantic by air to attend–1,000 from Great Britain alone.

There are a lot of tales of the efforts made by Scouts to attend the Jamboree, with the New Zealand contingent leaving four months ahead of the event and traveling over 30,000 miles on the way. There were also three Brazilian Scouts who traveled from their hometown by jeep.

Three days before the Jamboree was due to open, a vicious storm of hurricane strength (the tail end of Hurricane Connie) blew over the camp for nearly 24 hours, flattening much of the work that the volunteers and professionals spent six weeks preparing. A call went out to all district council members, communities and companies for volunteers to put the camp back in shape. The Coca-Cola Company closed all its plants and sent its employees to assist in the reconstruction. The camp was almost back to its original state in three days, ready for the opening.

Jackson Dodds, the Jamboree Camp Chief, Vincent Massey, Governor-General and Chief Scout for Canada, Lady Baden Powell and Lord Rowallan, Chief Scout of the British Commonwealth and Empire attended the opening ceremonies.

Chetwynd Films produced an award-winning film about the event, called Jamboree. The 40-minute film, which was sponsored by Eaton's, was Selected for Significance and became one of six films shown at the Canadian Pavilion at Expo 58 in Brussels.

The 50th Anniversary of the Jamboree was celebrated in September 2005 at which time a plaque commemorating the event was unveiled. The Niagara Parks Commission also planted a memorial oak tree.

== See also ==
- World Scout Jamboree
- Scouting in Ontario
