= BP Service Association in Canada =

Scouting organization in Canada

BPSA in Canada
- Country: Canada
- Founded: 1996
- Affiliation: World Federation of Independent Scouts
- Website http://www.bpsa-canada.org/

The BP Service Association in Canada (BPSA in Canada) was established in Victoria, British Columbia in 1996 as The Baden-Powell Scouts' Association of Canada (B-PSAC), rejecting the perceived modernization of the Scout method by Scouts Canada and sharing its aims with the other branches of the B-PSA. It is affiliated with the World Federation of Independent Scouts. The association was incorporated in British Columbia in 2000.

== Organization ==
The BPSA in Canada is a federation of independent provincial Traditional Scouting associations, comprising

- BPSA Alberta
- BPSA British Columbia
- BPSA Ontario
- BPSA New Brunswick

Membership is restricted to independent Canadian Scouting councils who follow the training programmes, ethics and morals of Robert Baden-Powell, and who accept the association's by-laws and child protection policy.

=== Scout Law ===
This Law is kept by Explorers from the age of eleven and up. Adult leaders must renew their promise on regular occasions and are expected to continue to live according to the Scout Law:

1. A Scout's honour is to be trusted
2. A Scout is Loyal.
3. A Scout's duty is to be useful and to help others.
4. A Scout is a friend to all and a brother to every other Scout.
5. A Scout is Courteous.
6. A Scout is a friend to animals.
7. A Scout obeys orders of his parents, patrol leader or Scoutmaster without question.
8. A Scout smiles and whistles under all difficulties.
9. A Scout is thrifty.
10. A Scout is clean in thought, word and deed.

=== Sections ===
The Baden-Powell Service Association in Canada has sections for each age range.

Section	Ages	Controlled by	Activities
Otters	5–7	Group	Swimming Otter is the highest available
Timber Wolves	8–11	Group	Leaping Wolf is the highest available
Explorers/Seafarers	11–15	Group	
Senior Explorers/Senior Seafarers	15–17	Group	The St. George Award is the highest available.
Rovers	18+	Group	No upper age limit. B-P Award is the highest available.

There are Seafarers (Sea Scouts), and a Lone Scouting plan for children living in remote locations who would otherwise be unable to take part in Scouting.

=== Child protection ===
The BPSA in Canada requires all adult volunteers to complete a vulnerable sector criminal record check, provide four personal references and complete a personal interview before appointment. Once appointed, volunteers must complete a four-month probationary period where they may only work with young people under supervision of a warranted leader. Adults are also required to complete training appropriate to their role in the group and report anyone who they consider may pose a danger to young people to the governing BPSA council.

== Controversies ==
The Baden-Powell Scouts' Association of Canada was incorporated on June 19, 1998 (Canada corporation number 350552-9). It started in Alberta under Kerry John Patrick Conlin, who was warranted as the Provincial Commissioner on December 28, 1998. From Alberta, Branches sprung up in Ontario, and BC, which had already started a traditional Scout movement, joined the fledgling Association. During that initial year, Mr. Mitch Rasmussen was made the Provincial Commissioner for Alberta and Kerry John Patrick Conlin was made the Branch Commissioner. Shortly thereafter, Scouts Canada initiated an "Allegation of Confusion" regarding the use of the word "Scout" in its title. On February 16, 2000, the corporation was renamed to "BPSA Canada". This corporation was dissolved on May 11, 2015. The BPSA-BC was incorporated in 2000.

Because BC and Ontario Provincial Commissioners were not willing to compromise to the degree Alberta was, there was a fracturing of the National Association. Provincial Branches broke away from Alberta, and BC and Ontario linked up to reform a "traditional style" Scouting program without the use of the word "Scout".

In 1999, the reformed Baden-Powell Service Association Federation of Canada (B-PSAFC) was ordered by Industry Canada "to take the word 'scout' out of its title." Scouts Canada also sought for the removal of the name Baden Powell, going on to say "...there's one scouting association in Canada, one in the world, every country has only one that's how Baden Powell set up scouting..." because "[Baden Powell] felt anything else would dilute the program, cause confusion and hurt the programs for young people." The World Organization of the Scouting Movement (WOSM) website reinforces this policy which states, "There can only be one [National Scout Organizations] per country."

According to B-PSAFC, Baden-Powell's original intention for Scouts Patrols to operate in a range of organizations and that there are two WOSM Scout associations in Canada. Scouts Canada contests the existence of two WOSM associations in Canada, clarifying their relationship with Association des Scouts du Canada to be one of an affiliation. Scouts Canada is the official WOSM organization which affiliates with the francophone organization.

Although the BPSA in Canada, in accord with Baden-Powell's 4th Scout Law, aim to recognize and work with all like-minded Scouting associations, Scouts Canada forbade their members from joining activities with members or groups of the BPSA, citing missing insurance coverage; likewise they forbade BPSA members from using Scouts Canada properties.
