= Federation of North-American Explorers =

- Headquarters: Toronto, Ontario
- Country: Canada and USA
- Founded: 1999
- Founder: Paul Ritchi
- Membership: 2200
- General Commissioner: Paul Ritchi
- Affiliation: UIGSE-FSE
- Website http://www.fneexplorers.com/

The Federation of North-American Explorers (FNE) is a Catholic faith-based, outdoor youth movement in Canada and the United States of America based on the methods of Lord Robert Baden-Powell and Venerable Jacques Sevin, SJ. It was founded in 1999 and serves more than 2200 members in 35 active groups throughout North America. The association is a member of the International Union of Guides and Scouts of Europe. However, due to fundamental differences in the values and ideals of the FNE and those of scouting as it has developed in North America, the FNE program stresses that they are Explorers and not scouts.

== Program ==
The association is divided in four sections according to age. These ages are the same for both the male and the female programs, both of which are separated by age and gender. The age level groups are:

- Otters, ages 5 to 7
- Timber Wolves, ages 8 to 12
- Explorers, ages 12 to 16
- Wayfarers, ages 17 to 24

== Program extent and Pontifical recognition ==
Although the FNE program in North America is limited to its 31 groups and approximately 2200 members, it is one of the 24 national associations that make up the International Union of Guides and Scouts of Europe (UIGSE-FSE). Combined, these countries account for more than 65,000 members. In 2003, the UIGSE-FSE received official recognition from the Vatican's Pontifical Council of the Laity as an International Association of the Faithful of Pontifical Right. In 2008, the association was further recognized in a letter from Vatican Secretary Josef Clemens, where he thanked them for their efforts. FNE established two associations FNE USA and FNE Canada in September of 2026.

== See also ==
- International Union of Guides and Scouts of Europe
