= Cub Scouts (Scouts Canada) =

- Totem: Wolf
- Age range: 8 to 10
- Country: Canada
Previous; Beaver Scouts	Next; Scouts

Cub Scouts is the Cub Scout section of Scouts Canada for children aged from 8 to 10. Originally the "Wolf Cubs," the program offers badges to youth members as a mark of achievement in an interest area. The badges are grouped into six activity areas as described in The Cub Book (Scouts Canada, 2005). While youth experience fun and excitement presented by the program, each activity area focuses on a specific purpose and goal, intended to be relevant to modern children while meeting developmental needs. Originally the requirement entry was age 7 until 2001. Each activity area offers a variety of badges that youth may earn and sew onto their uniform sash:

- A uniquely coloured "Star", awarded for completing a set of introductory requirements in the area. The requirements for a star are flexible, allowing youth to select tasks that are easier than full-blown badge requirements, align with their personal interests, or present an exciting challenge to them.
- A number of "Activity Badges", which focus on a variety of challenging activities in the activity area. Requirements for activity badges vary, and many may be tailored for youths' interests and talents. These activities may be completed individually or with others.
- One or two advanced badges known as "Awards". Typically, youth may only aspire to acquire the awards after first earning the star and a number of badges in the activity area.

The six activity areas are outlined in separate sections below.

== Uniform ==
Recently, the full uniform consists of a grey Cub Scout shirt, khaki shorts or pants, and a neckerchief indicating the youth's group membership. The old uniform was a sandstone Cub Scout shirt which required jeans or black long pants.

The activity badges described here are generally worn on the uniform shirt sleeve, with additional badges being held on campfire blankets or display books.

A diagram of the uniform, including placement of awards and crests, is provided on the Scouts Canada Website.

There is active interest in collecting Canadian Scouting memorabilia, even after youth have completed their years in the program. In addition to merit badges and awards that are worn on the uniform, youth often collect souvenir patches that may be displayed off the uniform; for example, they are often sewn onto campfire blankets or ponchos. Uniform badges will frequently find their way onto these items as well, as youth progress through the program, and are popular conversation pieces at Jamborees and campfires.

== Symbols ==
=== Cub Scout Promise ===
The Cub Scouts division has evolved since the 1950s and 1960s when it was extremely large in numbers. The original Cub Scout Promise, written by Scouting's founder Robert Baden-Powell, 1st Baron Baden-Powell, is, "I promise to do my best, to do my duty to God and the Queen, to keep the law of the Wolf Cub Pack, and do a good turn every day."

In recent years, this Promise has been changed to, "I promise to do my best, to love and serve God, to do my duty to the King; to keep the law of the Wolf Cub Pack, and to do a good turn for somebody every day." The alternative promise, "I promise to do my best, To be true to myself, To do my duty to my country; To keep the law of the Wolf Cub Pack, And to do a good turn for somebody every day," is available beginning in summer 2020.

=== The Jungle Book ===
Numerous symbols and references from Rudyard Kipling's The Jungle Book are used in Cub Scouts. These include the use of the term Akala as the leader of the Cub Scout Pack, encouragement of use of nicknames of characters in the book for Scouters (the pack's adult leaders), and others.

=== Structure ===
Cub scout groups in Scouts Canada are known as Packs. These are typically divided into smaller sections, Lairs.

== Badges ==
Scouts Canada now follows the Canadian Path. Badges include OAS (Outdoor Adventure Skills) and PAB (Personal Achievement Badges).

Past Badge System:

=== The Natural World - Black Star activities ===
The Natural World activities are intended to create a feeling of care and concern for the natural world, and an interest in nature study. Activities in this area provide opportunities for youth to explore the wonders of nature, learn about the connections between the environment and the life it supports, explore and develop an understanding of the effects people have on the environment, and give direct ideas about how to help the environment in everyday situations. (Scouting and the Family, p.vi)

The badges awarded in this activity area are:

- Black Star
- Astronomer Badge
- Observer Badge
- Gardener Badge
- Naturalist Badge
- Recycling Badge
- Climate Change Badge
- World Scout Environment Award
- Canadian Wilderness Award

=== The Outdoors - Green Star activities ===
The Outdoor activity area exists to develop confidence and early leadership skills through basic camping and outdoor interests. Activities in this area instruct youth on how to safely enjoy the outdoors, and encourage learning and participation in a variety of outdoor pursuits. (Scouting and the Family, p.vi) These activities also serve to prepare Cub aged youth to progress to the outdoor activities that are central to Scouting.

The badges awarded in this activity area are:

- Green Star
- Camping Badge
- Cooking Badge
- Fishing Badge
- Hiking Badge
- Trailcraft Badge
- Watercraft Badge
- Winter Cubbing Badge
- Canadian Camper Award

=== Creative Expression - Tawny Star activities ===
The purpose of the Creative Expression activity area is to encourage youth to creatively explore and express themselves through activities applying imagination and innovation. Activities are intended to provide creative outlets for children's interests through the use of music, arts, and crafts, increase awareness of how modern technology can be used for creative expression, and promote literacy and reading skills. Youth can also develop a sense of accomplishment by pursuing a project from start to finish. (Scouting and the Family, p.vi)

The badges awarded in this activity area are:

- Tawny Star
- Artist Badge
- Carpenter Badge
- Collector Badge
- Computer Badge
- Entertainer Badge
- Handicraft Badge
- Musician Badge
- Photographer Badge
- Reader Badge
- Canadian Arts Award

=== Health and Fitness - Red Star activities ===
The badges awarded in this activity area are:

- Red Star
- Athlete Badge
- Cyclist Badge
- Skater Badge
- Skier Badge
- Snowboarder Badge
- Swimmer Badge
- Team Player Badge
- Canadian Healthy Living Award

=== Home and Community - Blue Star activities ===
The activities in this area encourage youths' involvement in their homes and communities.

The badges awarded in this activity area are:

- Blue Star
- Disability Awareness Badge
- Family Helper Badge
- Family Safety Badge
- First Aider Badge
- Guide Badge
- Home Repair Badge
- Law Awareness Badge
- Pet Care Badge
- Emergency Preparedness Badge
- Canadian Family Care Award

=== Canada and the World - Purple Star activities ===
The activities in this area explore themes of national and international relevance. Additional activities (Specialty Badges) encourage youth to set special challenges for themselves as individuals and as a group.

The badges awarded in this activity area are:

- Purple Star
- Aboriginal Awareness Badge
- Canadian Heritage Badge
- International Trade Badge
- World Cubbing Badge
- Space Exploration Badge
- World Religions Badge
- Cub Individual Specialty Badge
- Pack Specialty Badge
- Language Strip(s)

Awarded for fluency in a language, is worn on the uniform, not the sash.

- Religion in Life

Various badges are awarded for various religions based on the requirements set in conjunction with those groups.

- World Citizen Award
