= Beaver Scouts (Scouts Canada) =

- Totem: Beaver
- Age range: 5 to 7
- Country: Canada
- Founded: 1971 (created); 1974 (part of Scouts Canada)
- Founders: Harry McCartney; Alan Jones; Gordon Hanna
| Previous – | Next; Cub Scouts |
- Website https://www.scouts.ca/programs/canadian-path/beaver-scouts/overview.html

Beaver Scouts is the Beavers section of Scouts Canada for children aged 5 to 7. When a Beaver graduates from the third year of the program, they become Cub Scouts.

The Scouts Canada section of Beaver Scouts was first inspired by the Beavers which began in Northern Ireland, named so in 1966. It began as an independent group in 1971, until absorbed by Scouts Canada in 1974. Scouts Canada's Beaver Scouts has, in turn, been the inspiration for many other divisions of Beavers scouts across the world.

== History and founding ==
The Canadian Beavers program was developed by three people: Harry McCartney, who was the Manitoba Executive Scout Director and the author of the short story Friends of the Forest; Alan Jones, who was a Winnipeg Scout Executive; and Gordon Hanna, who was part of the United Way Youth Council and was asked by McCartney to be the project's coordinator. As concepts were developed by Jones and Hanna, McCartney would write the next chapter of Friends of the Forest.

A one month grant from the United Way was provided to hire Gordon Hanna as the Project Coordinator to help develop and practically test the concepts. Three colonies were initially started in 3 parts of Winnipeg to pilot the ideas: Elmwood, St. James and St. Vital. The first colony in Elmwood had 13 boys join on Sept. 23rd, 1971. The program was an immediate success and grew exponentially. It was made an official part of Scouts Canada in 1974.

== Uniform ==
When in uniform, members normally wear a brown vest, a blue and brown bucket hat (with a tail signifying their year in the program), and a group specific neckerchief. An "Insignia Placement" diagram, including placement of awards and crests, is provided on the Scouts Canada Website (scroll down to "Uniform" and click the link there).

== Symbols ==
=== Investiture and Tail Ceremony ===
A new Beaver is called a "Kit"; a Kit must learn the Beaver Promise, Law, and Motto, and go through the Investiture and Tail Ceremony to become an "Eager Beaver". The ceremony officially welcomes the Beaver into the Beaver program, and during this ceremony the Beaver receives a tail, neckerchief, and badges for their uniform.

The color of the tail received is affixed to the back of their uniform hat, and represents their age:

- Brown tails are given to Beavers who begin the scouting year at 5 years of age
- Blue tails are given to Beavers who begin the scouting year at 6 years of age
- White tails are given to Beavers who begin the scouting year at 7 years of age

Beaver scouts must learn the Beaver Scouts promise, law, and motto.

- Promise: "I promise to be kind and help take care of the world." (Note: The alternative Promise "I promise to be kind and to help take care of the world" is available beginning in Summer 2020.)
- Law: "A Beaver has fun, works hard and helps family and friends."
- Motto: "Sharing, Sharing, Sharing"

=== Friends of the Forest ===
Many of the ideas incorporated into Beaver Scouts lore originate in Founder Harry McCarthy's short story Friends of the Forest, where a colony of beavers discover new humans building a cottage upriver, and befriend them. The story provides many inspirations for names and symbols used in Beaver Scouts, including nicknames that may be given to adult and cub scout leaders; the core values of sharing and cooperation; and the graduation of Eager Beavers into Wolf Cub Scouts.

=== Structure ===
An organized group of Beaver Scouts is called a Colony, and optional smaller groups inside the colony are called Lodges. These are analogous to Packs and Lairs, respectively, at the Cub Scout level. Lodges can be given animal names as chosen by the Lodge members.

Adult and older leaders inside the colony are referred to as Scouters, and they may have given to them one of the nicknames from Friends of the Forest, such as Hawkeye, Tic Tac, or Echo. A colony may also be assisted by second-year Cub Scouts (Trackers). New Cub Scout Tracker volunteers are given the nickname Grey Paw, and if they help frequently, they may be given a permanent wolf nickname by the colony.

Beaver colonies and/or their lodges meet frequently, to engage in activities, games, skits, storytelling; all of which are done to help a Beaver along their personal achievement path on The Pond. A beaver's Pond map stays with them and is updated throughout their days in Beaver Scouting; it is not reset each year.

=== Swim-up Ceremony ===
At the end of a white tail's year, they have the option to participate in a Swim-up Ceremony, in which they are formally graduated from Beaver Scouts and into first year Cub Scouts, as Wolf Runners.

== Badges ==
Several classes of badges are made available to Beaver Scouts:

- Personal Achievement Badges
- Outdoor Adventure Skills Badges
- The North Star Award, available to third-year white tails by completing the Northern Lights Quest
- The Canadian Path Link Badge (for Beaver Scouts, showing their progression to Cub Scouts)
