= Canadian Traditional Scouting Association =

- Incorporated as: "Canadian Traditional Scouting Association"
- Formerly known as: Traditional Explorers Association Council of Ontario
- Formerly known as: BPSC Canada / BPSC Ontario
- Headquarters: Waterloo, Ontario
- Founded: 2000
- Commissioner: Kenneth Weir
- President: Kimberly Griffiths
- Affiliation: World Organization of Independent Scouts
- Website ctsac.ca

The Canadian Traditional Scouting Association is a Traditional Scouting association in Ontario, Alberta, Quebec, and British Columbia in Canada. The Association is a conditional member of the World Organization of Independent Scouts. The Association is affiliated with the Baden-Powell Scouts' Association in the United Kingdom.

== Program ==
The Association's programs are based on the writings of Robert Baden-Powell, 1st Baron Baden-Powell who founded the Scouting movement in 1907. Of particular importance are B-P's books Scouting for Boys, The Wolf Cub's Handbook, Aids to Scoutmastership, and Rovering to Success. The programs have an emphasis on outdoor activities, skill development, youth leadership, and international travel. The Association uses the Scouting uniform as a tool to support their programs and generate pride in Scouting. Some troops wear the Stetson-style hat.

=== Sections ===
The Association has five program sections:

Section	Ages
Otter Romp	5–7
Timber Wolf Pack	8–11
Explorer Troop	11–14
Senior Explorer Troop	15–17
Rover Crew	18+

== Adult volunteers ==
=== Screening ===
The Association has a screening process for adult volunteers to ensure the safety of all members. This includes a Police Record Check including Vulnerable Sector Check, completion of the Application for Adult Membership, checks with four personal references, and an interview. Following this, the new member must complete a four-month probationary period.

=== Training ===
The Association has a training program for adult volunteers. Training is delivered face-to-face in an outdoor environment. Part I and Part II courses are available.

== Organization ==
The association is a democratic organization. Every adult member has a direct vote to elect the members of the board of directors, which is called the Executive Council. Important decisions are made at the annual general meeting where every adult has a vote and can attend in person or by teleconference. Policy development is a collaborative process by the membership.

The Association is all-volunteer.
