= Haliburton Scout Reserve =

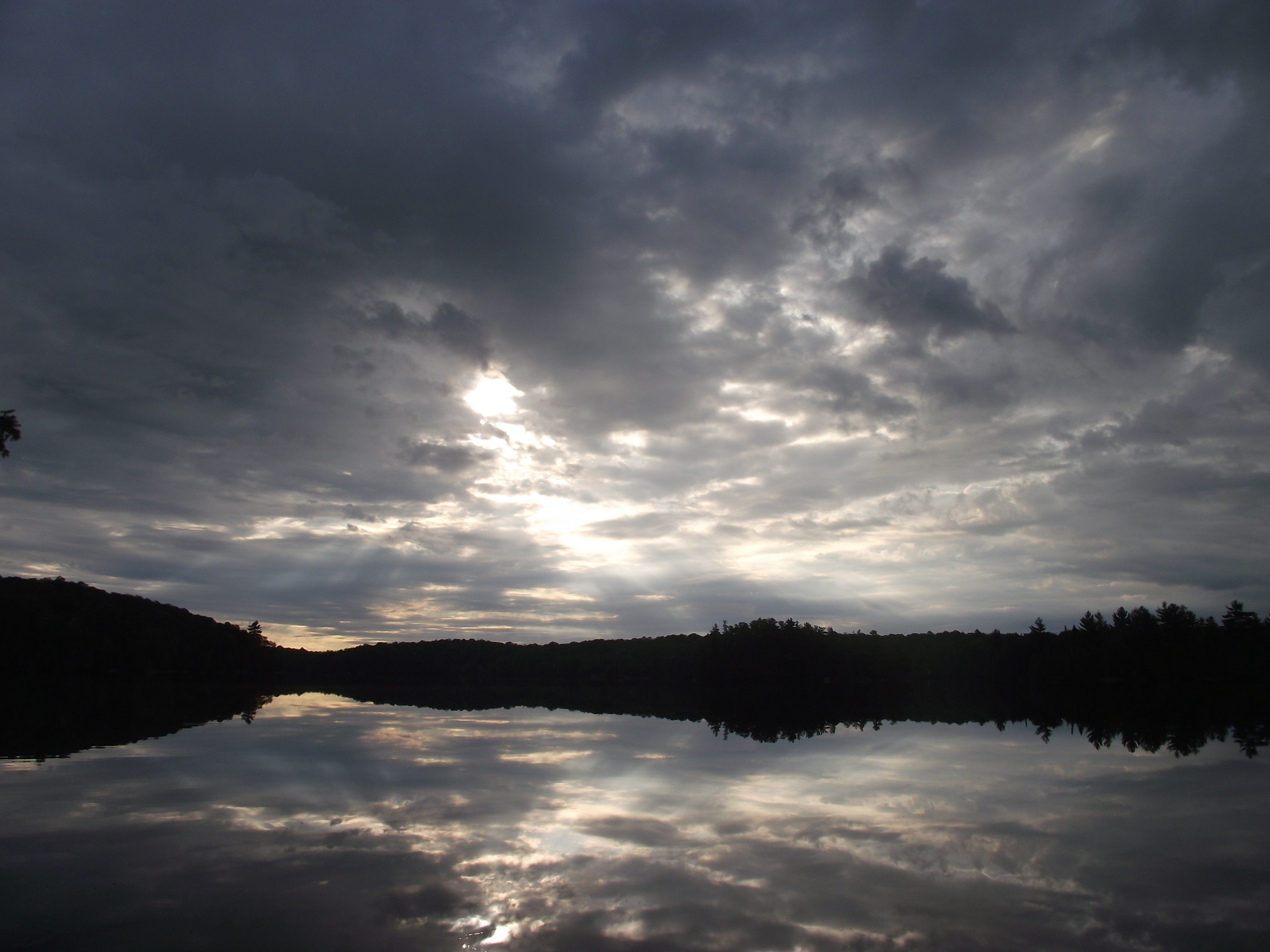
A view of the reserve from the Canoe Point campsite

Haliburton Scout Reserve (HSR) is a 22-square-kilometre (5,400-acre) Scout camp, originally a frontier Canadian logging camp, located east of Haliburton, Ontario and just south of Algonquin Park, one of Canada's natural wonders situated deep and secluded within the Canadian shield. Being one of the oldest camps in Canada, the Haliburton Scout Reserve opened in 1947 and has been operated consistently by Scouts Canada. HSR is located in the heart of the Haliburton highlands with 18 lakes and a rolling natural landscape rich in nature and untouched beauty. Centered on Kennabi Lake to the southeast of the property are 24 campsites accessible by water. HSR is Canada's largest Scout camp and third largest in North America. Scout troops normally come to the camp for week-long summer camps. The young and energetic HSR staff provide numerous adventurous programs for tens of thousands of scouts from around the world. HSR, as it is commonly known, is currently operated under Greater Toronto Council supervising the 50-70 young, well-trained resident staff who cooperate to run the diverse camp program throughout the summer months.

== History ==
Following World War II, Toronto Scout District (now Greater Toronto Council) wanted a rugged wilderness site for Scout camping. Their camping committee eventually located a 4,150 acres (16.8 km^{2}) site owned by Lindsey, Ontario businessman E. D. Fee, with timber-cutting rights held by the Mill Valley Lumber Company in now, Haliburton County, which was completing cutting in that area. The property was purchased in the fall of 1946 and opened the following summer as Camp Kennabi. Some of the original lumber camp buildings are still in use. The first Camp Chief was Field Commissioner James C. Moore, from 1947 to 1972, after whom Moore Lake (formerly Scraggle Lake) and the J. C. Trail are now named.

Starting in 1954, a composite camp (consisting of scouts from various troops attending as individuals with leadership provided by the camp staff) called Camp Kennaway, was run on the site. Camp Kennaway and Camp Kennabi merged in 1959 to form Haliburton Scout Reserve. Over the years, various plots of land were added to the original purchase, bringing the total size to over 5000 acres. Since 1947, thousands of Scouts from North America, Europe, and Asia along with many other areas globally have visited the Reserve to experience its fantastic adventure-centered program within the worldly-unique setting of the Canadian wilderness.

Since its earliest days, the camp has operated under the supervision of senior staff members supervising young staff members hired to run camp programs and help provide food and maintenance for the staff that do so. Staff members are more than often brought on for their first summer in a volunteer capacity, known as a Staff in Training (or SIT). This offers a chance to try their hand at the many positions that the camp has to offer for paid staff members that not only offers preferred hiring opportunities for the following summer but also a magnificent addition to any resume and the chance to fill out some if not all of your secondary school required volunteer hours. Staff are also hired in paid capacity right from the start if their abilities provide that opportunity. Staff spend the summer in a beautiful settings with powered room and board provided.

HSR was closed for the summers of 2020, 2021 and 2022 due to COVID-19. The Reserve was successfully reopened in the summer of 2023.

== Program ==
=== Staffed programs ===
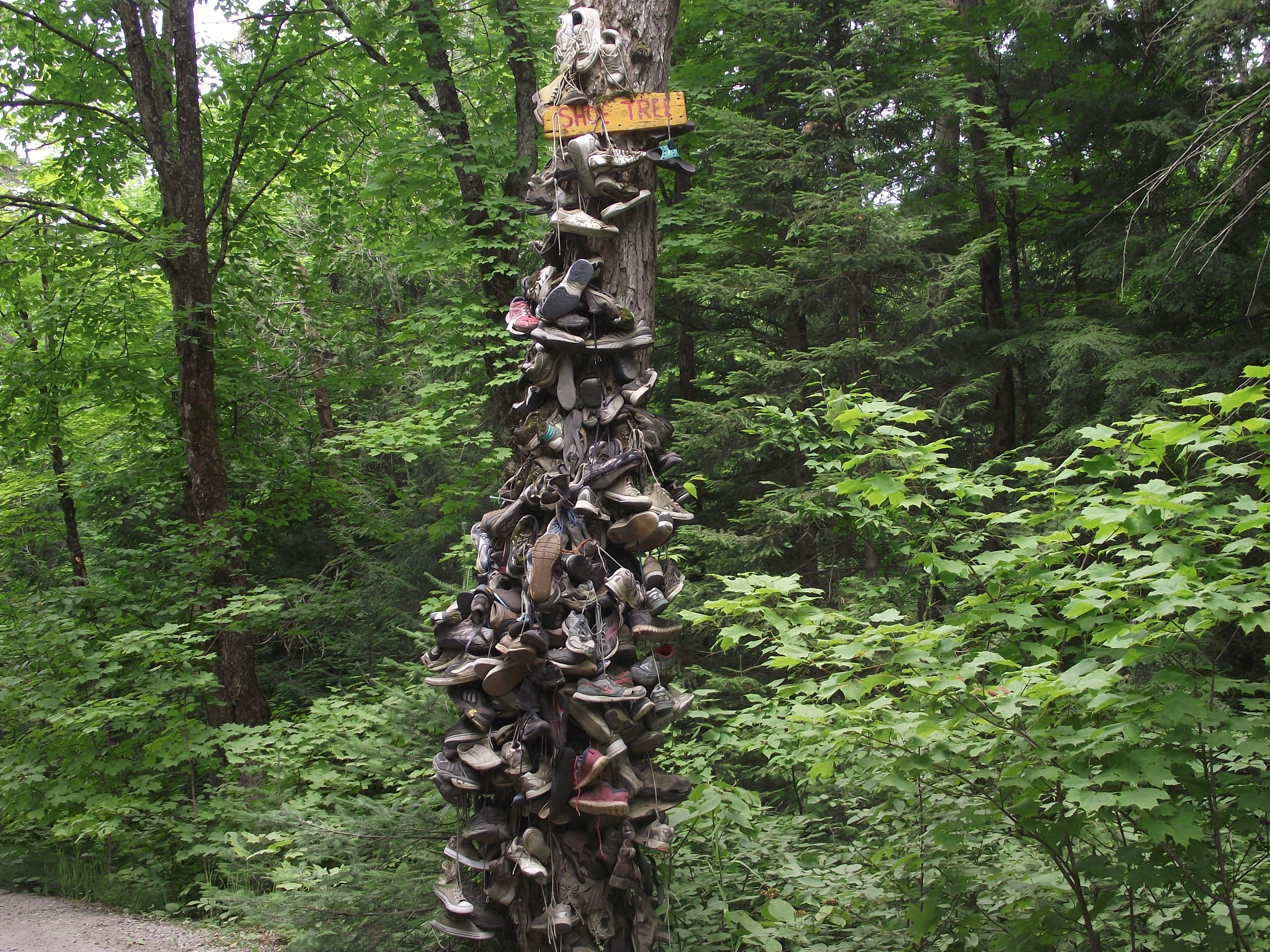
The Shoe Tree outside the entrance of the Scout Reserve.

After driving to your site on Saturday after you arrive, HSR's trained staff run a variety of instructional programs during the week starting with driving to the hub area for basic Canoe lessons on Sunday to get your group started with daily transportation. Programs throughout the week include:

- Sailing lessons
- Kayak lessons
- Riflery with .22 calibre rifles on a 18.288 m (20.000 yd) range.
- Archery
- Trapper's Cabin - Scouts visit a reconstructed cabin from the fur trapping era and learn about trapping and logging, both of which were practised on the land that is now HSR.
- Survival Island — Scouts learn about building shelters, purifying water, and how to become found if one is lost in the woods.
- Rappelling- Scouts get the chance to rappel down a 50-foot rock face deep in the Haliburton Wilderness.
- Climbing Wall
- Low Ropes course - An obstacle course including tight rope walks, slate bridges, etc.
- Snorkel Island — Scouts don mask, snorkel, and fins and search for treasures in the water near the island.
- Mountain Biking - Scout troops are taken for a three-hour ride to one of the few different locations
- Star Hike — Troops are barged to the middle of Kennabi Lake to look at the stars and hear stories about the constellations under a dark, milky way lit sky with full city-less view of the milky way streak. A must see for any youth from urban environments.
- Badge Trading — Scouts gather at the Hub on Tuesday evening from approximately 6:30 to 8:30 to trade and show badges. Present are youth and Leaders of all ages trading badges from their large collections. A must see for anyone in camp as the many attendees usually have large badge collections present with many decades of patches represented.

=== HSR Regatta ===
Thursday afternoon is the famous HSR Regatta. Troops gather at the Hub to compete in a variety of friendly water-based activities. The events normally include:

- War Canoe race — A race in which there are ten scouts in each war canoe. (This race uses two of the three ten person war canoes owned by the reserve)
- PFD Swim — Swimming while wearing a PFD (Personal Flotation Device)
- Match Swim — Contestants must swim from one dock to another carrying a match. The winner is the first to light their match. Matches are normally carried in the mouth to keep them dry.
- Medly Swim — Four Scouts swim in a relay, each using a different stroke (back stroke, breast stroke, side stroke, and free style).
- Head-Up Front Crawl Race - Venturers swim two laps of head-up front crawl
- In and Out Canoe Race — Scouts race canoes. When a whistle is blown, Scouts must jump out then climb back in before continuing.
- Canoe Sculling Race — Scouts race three to a canoe without paddles using their hands for propulsion.
- Canoe-Over-Canoe Race — Four Scouts with two canoes from each site race. When a whistle is blown, one canoe must swamp and be rescued by the other using canoe-over-canoe rescue, and then both canoes must race back to shore.
- Kayak Race - Venturers compete in an individual kayak race.
- Solo Canoe Race - Venturers compete in an individual canoe soloing race.

Although points are usually kept during the event, the rewards are usually restricted to friendly bragging rights and a take-home home trophy. Although the bragging rights seem to be more than enough to instill friendly competition between troops. A must-see for any attendee.

=== Camp-wide Fire ===
On Friday evening, the staff host a camp-wide campfire at Smokey Hollow, located just east of the hub down the camp road. Each group usually prepares a song or skit to perform at the campfire as a final send-off to the week long camp before departing on Saturday. At the same time as arriving for this fire in their canoes at the waterfront in front of the hub, campers can sign themselves in with their song or skit along as their canoes and they will be drove back to their site for the night on the pontoon boats before being drove out on the same boats the following morning. This is done to save time the following morning by having the canoes brought back on the night of the campfire. Due to the early morning the next day, Groups will be called from the campfire to leave in numerical order with some required to remain longer based on their departure time the next morning.

=== Program resources ===
Scouts will have access to their assigned canoes all week and rowboats present at site while kayaks, and sailboats will be available by request of a staff member after they have had their respective lesson in the craft. Kennabi Lake offers excellent fishing. Important to note is the license required to fish within Canadian inland waters for all who wish to do so, international or domestic in origin. These can be acquired online prior to arrival or at numerous outdoor shops throughout Ontario. For those wishing to venture off on their own to explore there are many day trips available including visiting the logging museum within Algonquin Provincial Park, seeing undomesticated wolves at the Haliburton Forest & Wildlife Reserve, or climbing up the Dorset County Scenic Lookout Tower in the town of Haliburton.

=== Hiking ===
HSR has an extensive network of marked hiking trails and outpost campsites, ideal for overnight hikes throughout the approximately 5000 acres of camp property. Hiking trails wind their way through forests and over rock formations typical of the Canadian Shield. One can often see wildlife, such as deer on these hikes. Popular hiking destinations include High Falls, where one can have a shower under the waterfall; Pike's Peak, a must-see, being the highest point on camp property offering a fantastic view of the rolling highlands; and Hurst Lake, where there is a large shelter and a supply of canoes. Campers are encouraged to plan out excursions in great detail with experienced staff due to the large amount of unused and overgrown trails not present on camp maps due to natural rehabilitation and to reduce risk of lost campers on such a large fence-less property.

== Facilities ==
The central facility at HSR for its staffers is called the Hub. Just below the Hub is the Trading Post where souvenirs, snacks, and a small amount of camping equipment are available for purchase. Nearby, just westward down the main camp road and down a small path southward past the camp clinic is the Dobson Centre, where the Country Store is located. The Country Store, essentially a small and basic grocery stop, stocks a full line of food and can make special orders (credit card facilities are NOT available anywhere in camp). Also located here is the camp office. Here, the campers and troop leaders can have any of their questions answered by a knowledgeable and experienced administrative staff. The camp clinic just north of this building is staffed by either a doctor and/or a nurse during each week long camp, available for necessary camp medical issues that may arise. For emergencies not treatable in camp, transportation is available into the town of Haliburton 23 minutes away that holds a fully staffed hospital installation.

Around Kennabi Lake and on its many islands are 24 troop campsites, often with one closed on rotation every summer for natural re-growth. Each of these include a dock, swimming area, picnic tables, ground cooler for food, outdoor kybos, rowboats, campfire circle, and several patrol sites. These offer a unique semi-secluded lakeside camping experience within the confines of the supervised camp. A very hard to find aspect within other camps throughout other North American establishments.

== Haliburton Scout Reserve Staff Alumni Association ==
The Haliburton Scout Reserve Staff Alumni was founded in 1989 and exists to provide former staff members of the Haliburton Scout Reserve with a sense of ongoing fellowship, camp news and history through linking present and past staff members, while promoting service to the camp through donations and service projects. A variety of activities are conducted each year, both social and service-oriented. Members are encouraged to participate in whatever activities for which they are available. For the majority of members who live outside the Toronto area, the Alumni Thunderbird newsletter is what keeps them connected.

In regards to the actual camp, the HSRAA provides a bursary offered to one current staff member who is attending post secondary education that is announced during the Alumni Weekend. During this weekend, the staff play an annual cricket game against the alumni. Any former staff member is eligible to join the HSR Staff Alumni, free of charge.
