= Tamaracouta Scout Reserve =

Tamaracouta Scout Reserve is a former Scout camp located near Mille Isles, Quebec. The camp, which claimed to be the oldest continuously operating Scout camp in the world, is situated on 1000 acres (4 km^{2}) of forest in the Laurentian Mountains. It was owned and operated by Scouts Canada Quebec Council. The camp was open year-round and offered a staff summer camp program.

== History ==
The camp opened in 1912 with funds provided by a group of generous citizens led by Colonel E.A. Whitehead. Originally a farm, the property formerly belonged to the Dawson family of Mille Isles. The name Tamaracouta comes from two sources. There are a large number of Tamarack trees located on the property. The word couta meaning body of water in a First Nations language.

After World War I, the camp decided to adopt a Hudson's Bay Company theme. Since that time, campsites have been named after the HBC Trading Posts. Staff positions also take HBC names, such as Camp factor instead of Camp Director.

The Tamaracouta Scout Reserve hosted the 11th Canadian Scout Jamboree, in July 2007, with 10,000 campers.

In 2018, the camp was temporarily closed and put up for sale in 2023.

== Knights of Tamara ==
The Knights of Tamara was an honour camping society formed in 1933. The Knights recognized outstanding campers who had shown devotion to Camp Tamarcouta during summer camp. As of 2005, over 3500 campers had become Knights.

=== Requirements ===
To become a Knight, a camper must have met certain requirements, such as having camped at TSR for a certain amount of time, being at least 14 years old by the end of the calendar year in which they are being knighted and be nominated by their peers. If their nomination is approved, they become a squire at a ceremony near the beginning of their week of camp. During the week, they must complete a work vigil, and an overnight vigil which consists of sleeping out alone one night in the woods, and also learning the words to "Hail Tamaracouta", a traditional song among other tasks.

==== Squires ====
Squires were recognized by the purple ring of indelible mystery ink (referred to as squire juice) painted on the face in a circle passing between the eyes and the hairline, between ears and eyes, and circling through the uppermost part of the chin. Squires must present themselves for "ringing" each morning at a very specific time; being late one day earns the squire a purple dot on the nose and two days earns them a purple chinstrap followed by one of many other decorations such as a second inner ring, a fully purple nose or any design of the ringer's discretion. If a squire misses a "ringing" for a poor reason, break camp rules, or act in a fashion unbecoming of a squire, they may be stripped of their squire status.

==== Jousting ====
Originally, at the end of the week, squires were presented for the last time in a special public ceremony which included a Joust by pairs of squires on a canvas tarp using first lard and then coco, the winner being the least covered in coco. The lard and coco jousts were stopped after females were invited to become Knights and to conform with Scouts Canada strict anti hazing policy. Initially, this style of jousting was replaced by a joust involving padded staffs used by 2 squires on a log, however, recently, around 2014, the joust was once again changed to 3 rounds of combat with padded longsword, padded shortsword and shield, and the option of either padded sword with shield or 2 padded swords. Following the joust, there are other steps, including the final "Second Ceremony", which is for Knights only.

==== Knights ====
Knights wear a bracelet with a large black bead tied with a piece of leather string around the right wrist. After twelve years, the knight is entitled to wear a silver bead. Only a silver bead knight can become a Grand Knight (master of ceremonies).

At founding in 1933, and for several decades thereafter, knights were given a colored bead reflecting the season in which they had become knighted.
