= Scouting and Guiding in Canada =

Scouting and Guiding movement in Canada

Scouting and Guiding in Canada's provinces and territories

The Scout and Guide movement in Canada is served by many separate organizations, some with various national and international affiliations.

== National and International affiliations ==
=== WOSM member associations ===
Scouts Canada is the Canadian member of World Organization of the Scout Movement (WOSM). Association des Scouts du Canada is affiliated with Scouts Canada and recognized by WOSM as an affiliate of a member organization. Scouts Canada and Association des Scouts du Canada, through their joint Committee on Cooperation, send a joint delegation to WOSM member conferences.

=== WAGGGS member association ===
The Guiding association within the World Association of Girl Guides and Girl Scouts is Girl Guides of Canada.

=== UIGSE member associations ===
There is one association affiliated with the UIGSE-FSE, with six groups in Ontario and one in Quebec:

- Federation of North-American Explorers

=== WFIS member associations ===
Canada has several associations which trace their roots to the Baden-Powell Scouts' Association in the United Kingdom. Some of them are members of the World Federation of Independent Scouts.

- BP Service Association in Canada
- Canadian Traditional Scouting Association (WFIS Prospect Member)
- ZHR Polish Scouts of Canada

=== Independent associations ===
There are also a number of independent Scouting and Guiding associations active in Canada. Among them are

- Association des aventuriers de Baden-Powell — Adventurers Association of Baden-Powell (AABP)
- Israeli Scouts of Toronto (Shevet Hermon), affiliated to Hebrew Scouts Movement in Israel
- Plast - Ukrainian Youth Association of Canada
- Związek Harcerstwa Polskiego Canada (ZHPpgk]: Polish Scouting Association in Canada Inc., a Polish émigré organization, not connected to Związek Harcerstwa Polskiego in Poland.
- Les Guides Franco-canadiennes

== History of Scouting in Canada ==
According to the book 75 Years of Scouting in Canada, the first Scouting groups in Canada were founded in 1908, the same year Baden-Powell's book, Scouting for Boys was published. St. Catharines and Merrickville are mentioned as among the locations of the first troops.

Scouts Canada states "There is evidence that a few Scouting groups started up in Canada in 1907", but provides no further details.

Chums Scouts, British Boy Scouts, the World Scouts, Girl Peace Scouts and Life Saving Scouts of the Salvation Army, Boys' Brigade scouts, Church Lads' Brigade scouts and Lone Scouts of America all operated in Canada.

Separate Canadian-originated and based organizations of boy scouts were formed as early as 1909 with some Provinces having competing organizations. The Canadian Scouts existed from 1917 to the early 1930s, mainly in Ontario.

Scouts Canada was formed in 1914 as the Canadian General Council of The Boy Scouts Association of the United Kingdom.

Numerous Francophone and Francophone Catholic scout organizations were established in Canada from the 1910s. See also Association des Scouts du Canada.

Armenian Scouts, Latvian, Estonian and Lithuanian Scouts, Polish Scouts, Plast Ukrainian Scouts, Russian Scouts in Exile and Hungarian Scouts were all well established in the late 1940s.

== Canadian Scouting in stamps ==
On 6 July 1983 Canada Post issued 'Scouting, 1908-1983' designed by François Dallaire, based on a drawing by Marc Fournier. The 32¢ stamps are perforated 13.5 mm and were printed by Ashton-Potter Limited.
