= Association des Scouts du Canada =

- Location: 7331, rue Saint-Denis, Montréal (Québec)
- Country: Canada
- Founded: 1961
- Membership: 12,357 youth; 4992 volunteers
- Chief Scout: David Johnston
- President: Serge Gélineau
- National Commissioner and Director General: Vincent Duval
- Affiliation: World Organization of the Scout Movement
- Website http://www.scoutsducanada.ca/

L'Association des Scouts du Canada (ASC) is a Canadian Scouting organization. ASC is a World Organization of the Scout Movement "affiliated organization" through affiliation with Scouts Canada. Scouts du Canada primarily furnishes Francophone Scouting in Canada.

== History ==
The first Canadian Scouting unit was founded in 1908. In 1925, Longueuil teacher Georges-Henri Sainte-Marie started his own unit in the Saint-Antoine de Longueuil parish and decided not to affiliate with the Canadian branch of The Boy Scouts Association of the United Kingdom. In 1928 a group of five troops located in Montreal created a separate association, the Fédération des catholiques des Éclaireurs canadiens-français. The ASC was created in 1961 and in 1975 three new federations were created-Ontario, Atlantic, and West.

In June 1994, the Association des Guides Francophones du Canada (AGFC), the association of French-speaking Guides of Canada, voted against a new protocol from the Girl Guides of Canada which asked for the return to female-only leaders and management, which would have resulted in the loss of approximately 60% of adult members, many of whom were men. In August of the same year the AGFC recommended to its members to join with the ASC and in October it became official. Some members continued as Les Guides franco-canadiennes.

In October 2004 the four federations were dissolved and the 40 districts are now under the direct responsibility of the ASC.

The gold Jerusalem Cross with the fleur-de-lis was the symbol of the ASC, based on the emblem of the Scouts de France which was designed by Father Jacques Sévin SJ, adding a superimposed maple leaf, the most widely recognized national symbol of Canada.

=== World Events hosted by Association des Scouts du Canada ===
- 14th World Scout Moot: 2013, Awacamenj Mino Camp, Québec

== Youth ==
The Association des Scouts du Canada has eight distinct programs:

| Age | Boys or mixed | Girls only |
|---|---|---|
| 7–8 years old | Castors | Hirondelles |
| 9–11 years old | Louveteaux | Exploratrices |
| 11–14 years old | Éclaireurs | Intrépides |
| 14–17 years old | Pionniers (always mixed) | |
| 18–21 years old | Routiers (always mixed) | |

Each one of these use a precise program. The number of youth per unit varies from 5 to 30 youth and adults, 1 adult per 5 to 8 youth, depending on their age. There are unisex units as well as mixed units. When a unit is a female only one, they can either use a girls-only program or the boys (mixed gender) one.

The association was built on the Catholic religion, but Canada being a multicultural country, their official stance on religion is left to each individual unit (some units include Muslim members, for example).

== Locations ==
Though the association has units in every province, a large number of members are located in the province of Quebec. At present, the biggest district is located in the city of Montreal.

== Adults ==
There are three primary functions served by adults in the association. Even as adults, members may progress further and be eligible to receive awards.

=== Monitors ===
Monitors are those who have contact with youth members in person. They organize activities following the VCPREF method as suggested by the ASC. Their job is to assist the youth in developing their physical, spiritual, intellectual, social and affective potential. Such (adult) leaders are eligible for the following awards: Gilwell knot (Noeud de Gilwell), and the Wood Badge (Badge de bois).

=== Trainers ===
These adult members are in charge of training and assisting Monitors.

=== Managers ===
Managers help monitors by doing administrative tasks such working in areas of the organization such as budget, census, communication, etc.

== See also ==
- Guides franco-canadiennes
- Scouting in Québec

== Publications ==
The ASC publishes the following materials for their members:

- Castors en plongée (7- to 8-year-olds), 2000
- L'Itinéraire des Hirondelles (7- to 8-year-old girls), 2000
- Meute en chasse (9- to 11-year-olds), 2002
- Réseau en exploration (9- to 11-year-old girls), 1996
- Parcours d'Éclaireurs (11- to 14-year-olds), 1998
- Le Club des Intrépides (11- to 14-year-old girls), 1996
- Cimes (14- to 17-year-olds), 1995
