= Scouts Canada =

Canadian Scouting association

- Emblem of Scouts Canada
- Headquarters: Ottawa, Ontario
- Country: Canada
- Founded: 1914, incorporated 12 June 1914
- Founder: The Boy Scouts Association (United Kingdom)
- Membership: 45,942 youth; 15,113 volunteers; 113 employees; 61,168 total membership
- Chief Scout: Les Stroud
- Patron Scout: Governor General of Canada
- National Commissioner: Kaelem Moniz
- National Youth Commissioner: Cadence James
- Executive Commissioner and CEO: Liam Burns
- Affiliation: World Organization of the Scout Movement
- Website; Scouts Canada

Scouts Canada is a Canadian Scouting association that provides programs for young people ages 5 to 26. It aims "to help develop well-rounded youth, better prepared for success in the world." Scouts Canada, in affiliation with the French-language Association des Scouts du Canada, is a member of the World Organization of the Scout Movement.

In 2024–2025, there were approximately 46,000 youth members and 15,000 volunteers in Scouts Canada. The association has declined significantly in size since its peak in 1965: youth membership is down 84% from approximately 288,000, and volunteers are down 55% from approximately 33,500.

== Values ==
Scouts Canada follows the Scouting Method, which includes elements such as the Scout Law and Promise, learning by doing, the team system, a symbolic framework, nature, personal progression, adult support, and community involvement. As part of the Canadian Path program, Scouts can earn a "Religion in Life" emblem by completing a denomination-specific program. In 2009, a "Spirituality Award" was introduced for Scouts and Guides who do not belong to a specific religious denomination. In 2020, alternative promises were introduced for Beaver Scouts, Cub Scouts, and higher levels, allowing individuals to pledge to their country or personal beliefs rather than a God or the King.

== History ==
According to Scouts Canada, Scouting groups had been established as early as 1907 in Canada, and in 1908 Baden-Powell wrote Scouting for Boys.

In his 1981 book 75 Years of Scouting in Canada, Robert Milks, the late Scouts Canada archivist, indicated that the first Scout groups in Canada were founded in 1908. St. Catharines and Merrickville are mentioned as among the locations of the first troops. Boy Scouts and the Scout Movement had a presence in Canada before the formation of Scouts Canada or its parent organization, The Boy Scouts Association of the United Kingdom were formed.

The Boy Scouts Association was formed in the United Kingdom in 1910 and incorporated in 1912. Some sources suggest that its founder, Baden-Powell, wrote to Earl Grey, the Governor General of Canada in 1910, and asked him to organize Scouting in Canada; Grey lent his office to be known as the Chief Scout for Canada. A branch of The Boy Scouts Association was established in Canada under The Boy Scouts Association's Overseas Department. The Canadian General Council of The Boy Scouts Association was incorporated by an Act of the Canadian Parliament on 12 June 1914. The Canadian General Council continued to be represented internationally by The Boy Scouts Association of the United Kingdom until 30 October 1946, when the Canadian General Council became a direct member of the Boy Scout World Conference, now the World Organization of the Scout Movement. In 1961, the Canadian General Council of The Boy Scouts Association later changed its name to Boy Scouts of Canada by an amendment to its incorporating Act of Parliament. In 1976, the Scouts Canada logo was introduced and the organization, by its By-laws, adopted the name Scouts Canada. In 2007 by Bill S-1001, the organization's name was amended to Scouts Canada in the establishing legislation.

In July 1930, Ontario's Hospital for Sick Children organized the Robert Louis Stevenson Boy Scout Troop to hold field days and weekly scouts and girl guides programming for internees.

In 1972, Scouts Canada began accepting female participants as part of its Rover Section. This was expanded in the late 1970s (but some sources cite 1984) to include the Venturer Section.

In 1983, Toronto-area Boy Scouts numbered nearly 17,000. By 2008, Toronto-area membership in the gender-neutral Scouts Canada had dropped to around 5,000.

In 1984, the Museum of Canadian Scouting, which was located in the national headquarters at 1345 Baseline Road in Ottawa, was going strong. As of 2025, that remained to be the case.

In 1990, Jim Blain, the Chief Executive of Scouts Canada, was awarded the 202nd Bronze Wolf, the only distinction of the World Organization of the Scout Movement, awarded by the World Scout Committee for exceptional services to world Scouting. He was also a recipient of the Silver World Award.

In 1991, Larry White was dismissed from leading Toronto's Hospital for Sick Children Boy Scout troop because he was homosexual. He appealed to the Ontario Human Rights Commission. In 1992, co-ed Scouting became an option for all program sections and in 1998 this became policy for all sections. The following year, the organization introduced its first gay Rover Crew for adults in Toronto, Ontario.

In 1999, the national headquarters of Scouts Canada threatened legal action to a traditionalist group that called itself the "Baden Powell Scouts Association of Canada" (BPSAC) if the BPSAC failed to remove the "Baden Powell" from its name. The traditionalists were ordered by Industry Canada to remove the word "scout" from their name. National executive Andy McLaughlin was adamant that "As far as Scouts Canada is concerned, there's one scouting association in Canada, one in the world, every country has only one that's how Baden Powell set up scouting, he set up one organization per country. He felt anything else would dilute the program, cause confusion and hurt the programs for young people."

In 2001, members saw a significant reorganization country-wide. Regions and Districts were reorganized into Council and Areas. Many Districts employed their staff, had youth assistance funds, and separated Jamboree funds. All of this was under the control and supervision of a local Board of Directors. The members of the Board were past commissioners and community business leaders, most of whom had a Scouting background in their youth. The group handled staffing, helped identify future Trainers, Commissioners, and senior Service Scouters, supervised budgets for employees and camps, and raised funds from the Community. There were other Districts, mainly rural and those in isolated communities that were not what were called 'employing councils' and the change was made to attempt to change these differences. Likewise, at this time Provincial Councils such as the Provincial Council for Ontario were disbanded.

In March 2011, Scouts Canada introduced a significant redesign of the organization's uniform, moving to be made by Joe Fresh. The uniforms of the Beavers' changed only in color and fabric. The major changes in the uniform design are seen in the changes to the style of the button-up shirt and its color from khaki to grey, green, blue, or red, for Cubs, Scouts, Venturers, Rovers/Leaders respectively. As part of the re-design, the sash was eliminated as a uniform component, which resulted in smaller proficiency badges being made for Cub Scouts and Scouts to sew directly onto their uniforms. Fashion magazine Flare described the new uniforms as stylish and comfortable. The material for the red uniform shirt (not the activity golf shirt) changed in mid-2016 because of performance issues.

From 2012 through 2017, Scouts Canada's National Youth Network launched an initiative to increase awareness of Scouting among members and the general public. The campaign was designed to encourage Canadians to do 'good turns' for each other. For several years, silicon bracelets were distributed across Canada with the message "Good Turn Week." In addition to the original initiative, a fund was established to sponsor selected community service projects.

The Church of Jesus Christ of Latter-day Saints ended its association with Scouts Canada at the end of 2019, leading to a membership decline of over 5%.

In 2021, Scouts Canada announced a mandatory COVID-19 vaccination requirement for all in-person meetings, effective 1 November. The vaccine requirement was removed by Scouts Canada effective September 1, 2022.

In 2025, amid financial decline, Scouts Canada laid off over 30% of its staff nationwide. The organization eliminated the field services department which was responsible for in-person accountability in each council. A new strategic plan was then released outline how Scouts Canada was going to push growth for future survival.

== Organizational structure ==
Scouts Canada is governed by a Board of Governors. It is divided into twenty Councils, each administering a whole province or large part thereof. The national body and Councils are organized around a key three which include a Scouter, Youth, and Staff member. The national body consists of a National Commissioner appointed by the Voting Members, a National Youth Commissioner appointed by the Voting Members, and an Executive Commissioner appointed by the Board of Governors.

The Council Three consists of a Council Commissioner appointed by the National Commissioner, a Council Youth Commissioner appointed by the National Youth Commissioner, and a Council Relationship Manager appointed by the Executive Commissioner. Council Commissioners in consultation with their respective key three furthermore appoint their management teams to manage the interests of the council. All positions are advertised publicly and a selection committee interviews members based on skill set.

Scouts Canada is affiliated with Association des Scouts du Canada.

Under the World Organization of the Scout Movement's constitution, only one organization is recognized in each country. Canada is the only country in which this recognition is held jointly. Many other countries also have more than one Scouting organization and, of these, several have formed national federations which are the World Organization of the Scout Movement members. Scouts Canada and L'Association des Scouts du Canada send a joint delegation to meetings of the World Organization of the Scout Movement; this is coordinated through the Committee on Cooperation.

The Patron Scout of Canada is the current Governor General of Canada. From 1910 to 1946, the position of Chief Scout for Canada and, from 1946 to 2013, the position of Chief Scout of Canada were held by successive Governors General of Canada. On 19 April 2013, the Scouts Canada Board of Governors appointed Terry Grant as Chief Scout of Canada, and the honorary title held by the governor general was changed to Patron Scout.

== Programs ==
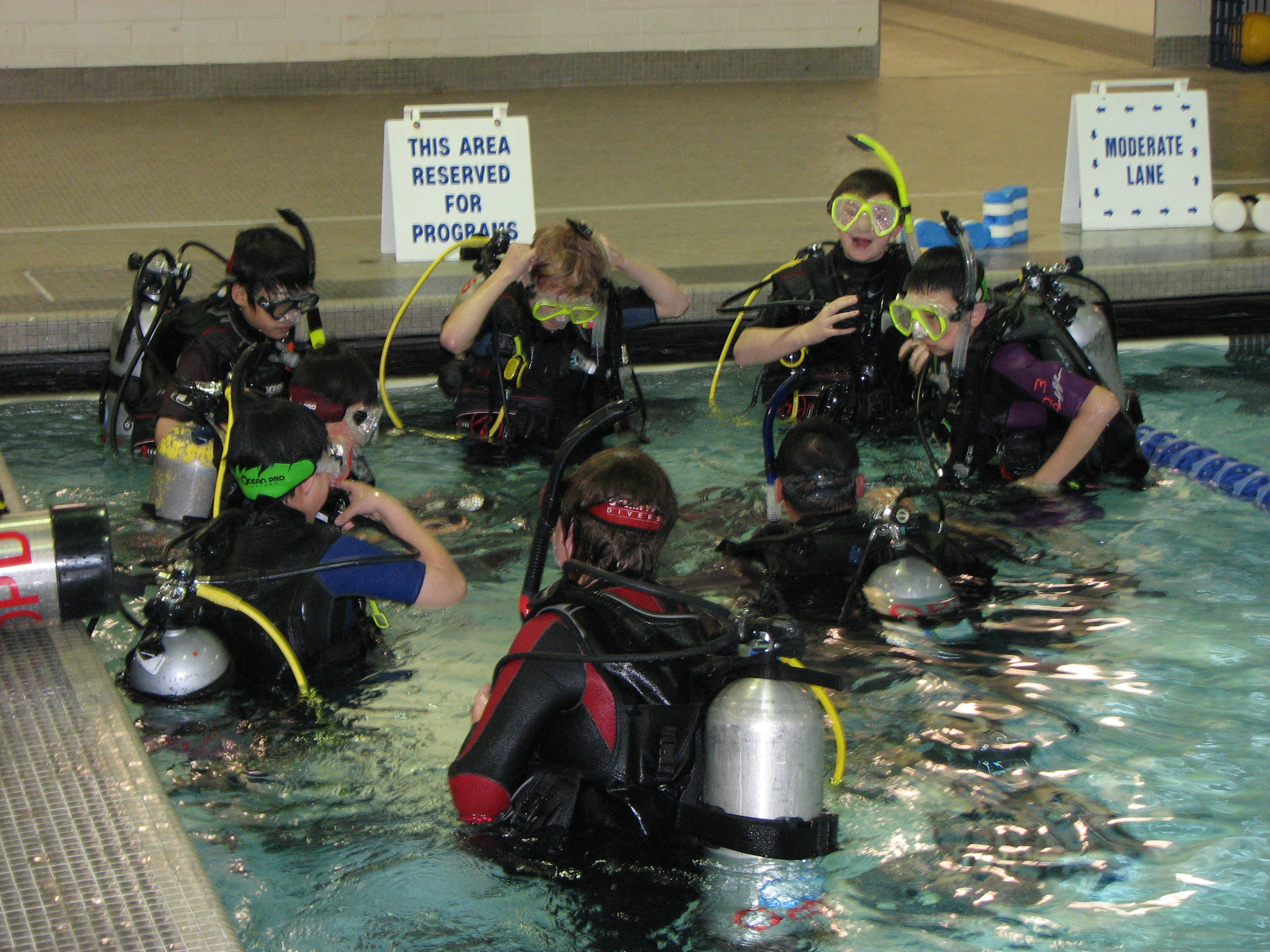
Scouts Canada members learn to scuba dive in a swimming pool

=== Sections ===
The full-time sections of Scouts Canada are divided primarily by participant age. All sections utilize a redeveloped model called the Canadian Path. The new approach takes notes from traditional Scouting practices. It allows youth to develop along a common path (with section-specific themes) from Beaver Scouts up to and including Rover Scouts.

- Beaver Scouts is a Beavers section for children between ages 5 to 7. Activities include crafts, games, sports, music, hikes, and camping.
- Cub Scouts is for children ages 8 to 10. Activities of the program include hiking, camping, and water activities such as canoeing and kayaking.

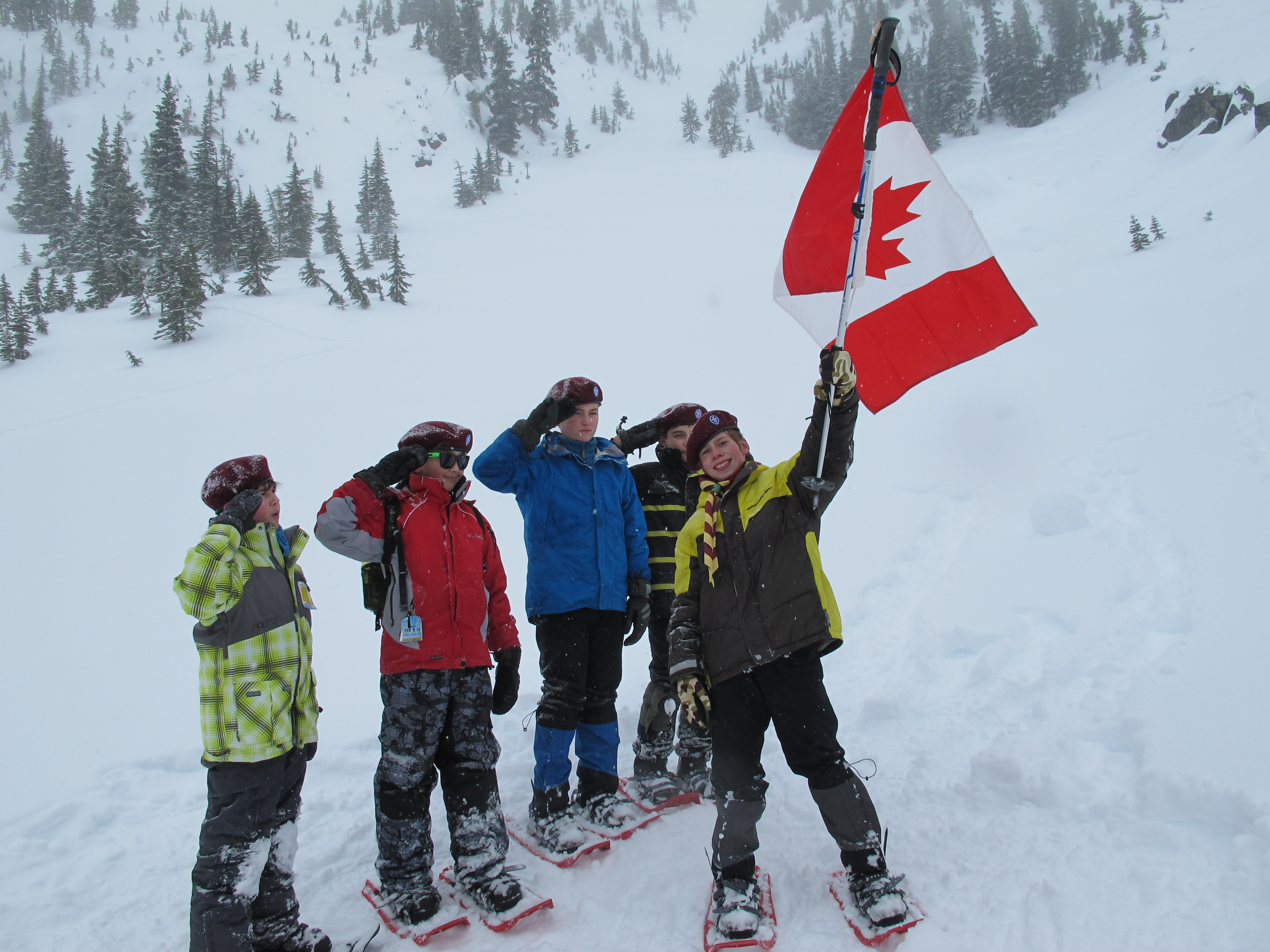
Mountaineering Scouts

- Scouts is for youth between 11 and 14 years old. Activities include outdoor activities, camping, hiking, and participation in youth forums.
- Venturer Scouts is for teens between 15 and 17 years old. Its activities include hiking, camping, and more advanced training programs: white water kayaking / canoeing, mountaineering, week-long expeditions in National parks and international activities including service projects.
- Rover Scouts is the eldest youth section in Scouting for teens and adults between 18 and 26 years old. Activities include "high adventure activities" ranging from multi-week expeditions with challenges of increasing difficulty, taking on leadership roles working with younger sections, and assisting with or running service projects at a local/national/international level.

=== Vocational programs ===
- Medical Venturers/Medical Rovers (Medvents/Medrovers) is a program for Venturers and Rovers who learn and provide first-aid. Medical Venturers in Toronto have used an AED to assist a patient in cardiac arrest.
- Fire Venturers learn basic firefighting skills while working with fire departments
- Police Venturers learn firearm safety, crowd control, and similar skills while working with police departments
- Service Corps Venturers/Rovers provide community service within the Scouting Community and outside organizations including Heritage Canada, The Ottawa Hospital Foundation, The Ottawa Food Bank and The Royal Canadian Legion's Dominion Command.

=== International Programs ===
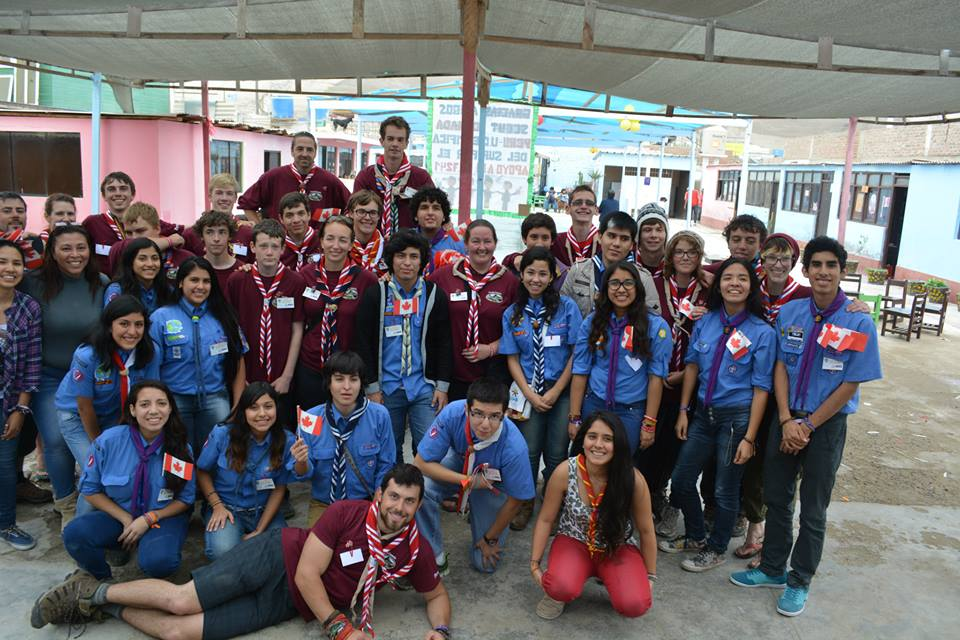
Brotherhood project in 2014 visited Peru.

ScoutsAbroad is a program which was created to support the Canadian Brotherhood Fund. Scouts in Canada support Scouts in developing countries through initiatives that promote self-sufficiency. The Canadian Brotherhood Fund provides through grants, "seed money" for many international development projects. The ScoutsAbroad program also promotes youth involvement in learning about their world through penpal programs, international events, and international exchanges.

International Development Projects are known internally as Brotherhood Projects which stems from the Canadian Brotherhood Fund. Groups of Scouts in developing countries develop and carry out projects to improve their own lives and the future of their communities. In some cases, members of Scouts Canada travel abroad to assist in carrying out portions of a project. 13 projects have been completed since 2007.

=== Part-time programs ===
Scouts Canada also has programs designated as Part-Time Programs.

- The SCOUTSabout program is for children between 5 and 10 years old who are not members of a Scouting organization.SCOUTSabout is implemented in 3-month-long modules to appeal to those families who do not want or cannot commit to year-round activities. The focus is on structured play and learning by doing, without uniforms, badge programs, or ceremonies.
- Extreme Adventure offers the opportunity for young people from ages 14 to 17 to plan and participate in different short-term adventure-based activities. Activities include hiking, long-term camping, and traveling abroad to participate in humanitarian projects. There are no uniforms or ceremonies associated with this program.

== Major youth awards ==
Scouts Canada has several major youth awards which include:

- The Chief Scout's Award was established in 1973 as the top award in the Scout section.
- The King's Venturer Award is the top award in the Venturer section. In 1968, the upper age for members of the Scout section was reduced from 17 to 14 and the Venturer section was created for ages 14–17. As part of these changes, the Queen's Scout rank was replaced with the Queen's Venturer Award.
- The Amory Adventure Award is awarded to the Venturer company that exhibits the most initiative in conceiving, planning, and executing an outdoor adventure.
- The Medal of the Maple was created in 2007 and is awarded for distinguished youth service and excellence within the Scouting Movement.

== Camps ==
Scouts Canada operates over 125 camps across Canada. Popular camps include Camp Impeesa, Haliburton Scout Reserve, Camp Byng and Tamaracouta Scout Reserve. Tamaracouta Scout Reserve was among the oldest continually operating Scout camps in the world until its closure in 2019.

== Major events ==
=== Canadian Scout Jamboree ===
The Canadian Scout Jamboree or CJ is a national jamboree run by Scouts Canada for Scouts and Venturers across Canada. They have been held in 1949, 1953, 1961, and about every four years since 1977.

=== ADVenture ===
ADVenture is run by Scouts Canada for members of the Venturer Scout Section. Created to differentiate Scouts from Venturers, ADVenture provides a different style of national camp for an older age group.

- 2012: 1st Venturer ADVenture, Haliburton Scout Reserve, Haliburton, Ontario
- 2014: 2nd Venturer ADVenture, Camp Nor’ Wes, Newfoundland

=== World Jamborees hosted by Scouts Canada ===
- 8th World Scout Jamboree, 1955, Niagara-on-the-Lake, Ontario; first World Jamboree held outside of Europe
- 15th World Scout Jamboree, 1983, Kananaskis, Alberta
- 24th World Scout Jamboree, 2019, The Summit Bechtel Family National Scout Reserve in Glen Jean, West Virginia. Scouts Canada co-hosted along with the Asociación de Scouts de México and the Boy Scouts of America.

=== Canadian Moots ===
Moots are for Rover Scouts.

- 1st Canadian Rover Moot: 1951, Blue Springs, Ontario 538 Attend
- 2nd Canadian Rover Moot: 1956, Sussex, New Brunswick
- 3rd Canadian Rover Moot: 1959, Banff, Alberta
- 4th Canadian Rover Moot: 1962, Mekinac, Quebec Around 1000 attend
- 5th Canadian Rover Moot: 1966, Parksville, British Columbia
- 6th Canadian Rover Moot: 1970, Birds Hill Park, Winnipeg, Manitoba
- 7th Canadian Rover Moot: 1974, Camp Samac, Oshawa, Ontario
- 8th Canadian Rover Moot: 1978, Camp Impeesa, Pincher Creek, Alberta
- 9th Canadian Rover Moot: 1982, Camp Wetaskiwin, St. Catharines, Ontario 531 Attend
- 10th Canadian Rover Moot: 1986, McLean Park, Langley, British Columbia

== National Youth Network ==
National Youth Network members in the National Scouts Canada Conference in Ottawa in November 2012.

The National Youth Network consists of Scouts Canada youth from across the country. The purpose of the National Youth Network is to ensure meaningful youth involvement in all Scouts Canada decisions, support the organization of Council Youth Networks, and encourage youth to take on leadership roles.

The National Youth Network typically consists of one National Youth Commissioner, three Assistant National Youth Commissioners and 20 Council Youth Commissioners.

=== Projects ===
Develop and promote FLEX, FAST and FOCUS – Scouts Canada's Youth Leadership training programs for Cub Scouts, Scouts, and Venturer Scouts. In 2018, Scouts Canada released the Scouts Canada Youth Leadership Training which will replace FLEX, FAST, and FOCUS, introducing courses for all five sections which integrate with the new Canadian Path program. The Youth Network also maintains and adjudicates the Medal of the Maple for Distinguished Youth Service.

The National Youth Network is a small part of the larger Scouts Canada Youth Network which includes the National Youth Network, the Council Youth Networks, the Area Youth Networks and other youth representatives across Canada.

== Initiatives ==
Scouts Canada has implemented initiatives to increase membership nationwide. This process includes more direct program support to leaders; building on such things as a partnership with the Robert Bateman Foundation, a program help line, an award-winning Climate Change program and various camping programs across the country.

== Controversies ==
=== Organizational structure ===
Scouts Canada is governed, like all incorporated non-profit organizations, by a Board of Governors. Each Council elects three Voting Members of whom at least one must be a youth. All members can vote for and or be nominees for Council Voting Members. At the National Annual General Meeting of Members, Voting Members elect the Board of Governors and the National Commissioner.

There are Scouters, most notably members of an organization called SCOUT eh! who believe there is a lack of representation and lack of accountability in this governance structure.

=== Child protection ===
In 2012, the CBC ran a documentary suggesting that Scouts Canada had not always reported leaders who had sexually abused children to the police, relating to incidents that took place between 1960 and 1990. Scouts Canada subsequently posted a video apology followed by "a thorough, arms-length review of all records held by Scouts Canada on Leader suspensions or terminations related to abuse" by KPMG's forensic investigations unit. The report from KPMG subsequently "found no systemic intent to cover up or hide incidents of abuse".

==== Youth Protection ====
In the fall of 1996, Scouts Canada modernized its screening practices for adult members to require a Police Record Check, with a Vulnerable Sector Check added in 2015–2016. As part of this screening, local volunteers interview applicants and check the multiple references they must provide during the Volunteer Recruitment and Development (VRAD) process. Scouts Canada volunteers are prohibited from being alone with a youth member; two fully screened volunteers have to be present at all times with any youth. If a volunteer is suspected of misconduct, Scouts Canada policy requires that they are immediately suspended and the relevant authorities are notified with all information shared as part of an investigation into the volunteer's actions.

Scouts Canada distributes a booklet called How to Protect Your Children from Child Abuse: A Parent's Guide, available in handbooks and online. In addition, it is a badge requirement in the Scout program for parents and youth to review a portion of How to Protect Your Children from Child Abuse: A Parent's Guide

=== Relations with other Scout associations ===
In 1999, the Baden-Powell Scouts' Association of Canada was ordered by Industry Canada "to take the word 'scout' out of its title", becoming the Baden-Powell Service Association Federation of Canada. Scouts Canada also sought the removal of the name "Baden-Powell", saying "there's one Scouting association in Canada – one in the world; every country has only one; that's how Baden Powell set up Scouting" because "[Baden-Powell] felt anything else would dilute the program, cause confusion and hurt the programs for young people." The World Organization of the Scouting Movement website reinforces this policy by stating, "There can only be one [National Scout Organization] per country."

== See also ==
- Scouting in Canada
- Girl Guides of Canada
