= BC Energy Step Code =

Canadian provincial regulation

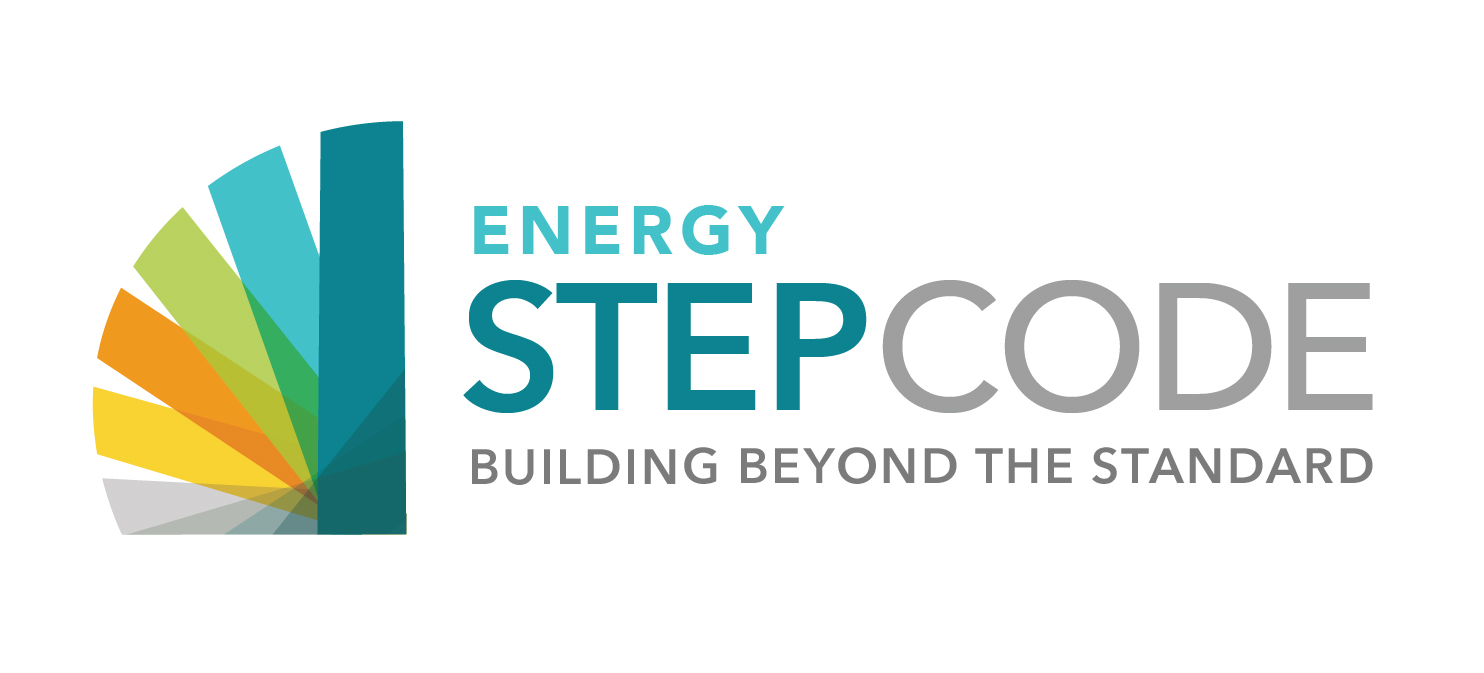
BC Energy Step Code Logo

The BC Energy Step Code is a provincial regulation that local governments in British Columbia, Canada, may use, if they wish, to incentivize or require a level of energy efficiency in new construction that goes above and beyond the requirements of the base building code. It is an example of a "stretch code," or "reach code," in that it is an appendix to a mandatory minimum energy code that allows communities to voluntarily adopt a uniform approach to achieving more ambitious levels of energy efficiency in new construction.

The BC Energy Step Code consists of a series of specific measurable efficiency targets, and groups them into "steps" that represent increasing levels of energy-efficiency performance. By gradually adopting one or more steps, a local government can increase the building performance requirements in its community. The regulation is designed as a technical roadmap to help the province reach its target that all new buildings will attain a net zero energy ready level of performance by 2032.

The Government of British Columbia enacted the BC Energy Step Code as regulation on April 6, 2017. It entered into legal force on December 15, 2017.

== How it works ==
The BC Energy Step Code establishes a series of measurable energy-efficiency requirements that builders must meet in communities that reference it in their building and development bylaws. The regulation groups these performance targets into a series of "steps" of increasing energy efficiency. Step 1 simply requires confirmation that new buildings meet the existing energy-efficiency requirements of the existing BC Building Code. Meanwhile, at the opposite end of the scale, Step 5 for homes represents a home that is net-zero energy ready. A Step 5 home is effectively the most energy-efficient home that can be built today, roughly equivalent to the rigorous Passive house standard.

The BC Building Code separates all buildings into two basic categories – Part 9 and Part 3, as follows:

- Part 9 buildings refer to houses and small buildings three storeys or less, that have a building area or "footprint" no more than 600 square metres. This category includes single-family homes, duplexes, townhomes, small apartment buildings, and small stores, offices, and industrial shops.
- Part 3 buildings are larger and more complex. They are four storeys and taller, and have a footprint greater than 600 square metres. This category includes larger apartment buildings, condos, shopping malls, office buildings, hospitals, care facilities, schools, churches, theatres, and restaurants.

For Part 9 buildings, there are five steps of the BC Energy Step Code; Part 3 buildings have four steps, while commercial buildings have three. Each step represents a more stringent set of energy-efficiency requirements. As communities climb the steps, they gradually increase the level of energy efficiency in their new buildings. The BC Energy Step Code applies to new construction only.

For small buildings, Steps 1 to 3 (collectively, the "Lower Steps") can be achieved using construction techniques and products readily understood and available in today's market; homes built to Steps 4 and 5 (the "Upper Steps") are more ambitious and may require more training and incentives to achieve.

The regulation is performance-based, not prescriptive, in that it does not specify the specific materials and strategies a builder must use. Instead, it sets measurable performance targets that the proposed building must meet.

To ensure that builders have the skills and capacity they need to cost-effectively produce higher performance buildings, until 2020, governments that wish to use the BC Energy Step Code may incentivize all steps, but may only require Lower Steps.

== What it measures ==
The BC Energy Step Code measures a building's energy performance via a variety of metrics. The Building Envelope Metrics and the Equipment and Systems Metrics are demonstrated through a whole-building performance simulation, while the Airtightness Metric is demonstrated through an on-site blower door test of the building before occupancy.

=== Building envelope metrics ===
- Thermal Energy Demand Intensity (TEDI): The amount of annual heating energy needed to maintain a stable interior temperature, taking into account heat loss through the envelope and passive gains (i.e., the amount of heat gained from solar energy passing through the envelope, or from activities in the home such as cooking and lighting, and that provided by body heat). It is calculated per unit of area of the conditioned space over the course of a year, and expressed in kWh/(m2·year).

=== Equipment and systems metrics ===
- Percent Lower than EnerGuide Reference House: An EnerGuide reference house establishes how much energy a home would use if it was built to base building code standards. This metric identifies how much less energy, stated as a percentage, the new home will require compared to the reference house.
- Mechanical Energy Use Intensity: The modelled amount of energy used by space heating and cooling, ventilation, and domestic hot water systems, per unit of area, over the course of a year, expressed in kWh/(m2·year).
- Total Energy Use Intensity: The modelled amount of total energy used by a building, per unit of area, over the course of a year, expressed in kWh/(m2·year).

=== Airtightness metrics ===
- Air Changes per Hour at a 50 Pa Pressure differential, as measured by a blower door test.
- Air Leakage Rate: A measure of the rate that air leaks through the building envelope per unit area of the building envelope, as recorded in L/(sm2) at a 75 Pa pressure differential.

== Requirements ==
To meet the requirements of the BC Energy Step Code, builders will work with an energy advisor to check that their plans will meet the energy-performance requirements of a given step. An energy advisor uses software to analyze construction plans and determine the energy efficiency of a building. The builder then begins construction, paying special attention to the building envelope—the walls, windows, doors, and insulation. The energy advisor also tests a building once it is built to see how well it performs.

To achieve the Lower Steps, building and design professionals and trades can rely on conventional building designs with careful air-sealing practices, and incrementally incorporate some key elements in the design, building envelope, and equipment and systems. Builders and designers will collaborate with the energy advisor to select the most cost effective way to meet the standard's requirements. These Lower Steps give builders new flexibility in how to achieve modest gains in efficiency through improved envelopes and/or upgraded systems.

To achieve the Upper Steps, builders and designers will need to adopt an integrated design approach to building design and may need to incorporate more substantial changes in building design, layout, framing techniques, system selection, and materials. These techniques and materials will be more costly and challenging without additional training and experience.

== Origins ==
In September 2015, the province's Building Safety and Standards branch established an Energy Efficiency Working Group (EEWG) to review policies and regulations that apply to energy efficiency in BC, to seek stakeholder input and offer guidance on how to best implement an Energy Step Code to achieve consistent building energy performance beyond the BC Building Code. The consultations engaged with the building and development sectors, and the trades and professions that support them, as well as local governments, utilities, and other stakeholders, to identify a consistent approach to increasing energy-efficiency standards.

In August 2016, the group renamed itself the Stretch Code Implementation Working Group and published its final report and recommendations, including adoption of a Step Code into a voluntary provincial regulation.

== The Energy Step Code Council ==
In mid 2017, the province renamed the group the Energy Step Code Council, and mandated it "to support local governments and industry towards smooth uptake of the BC Energy Step Code and help guide market transformation towards higher-performance buildings within B.C." The Energy Step Code Council meets quarterly to support training and capacity building opportunities for local governments, industry, and other stakeholder, communicate what the BC Energy Step Code is and how it may be implemented across the province, and provide advice and clarification on technical aspects of the standard.

== Cost implications of adoption ==
In September 2017, BC Housing, the province's housing authority, and the Energy Step Code Council published the BC Energy Step Code 2017 Metrics Research Study as a comprehensive exploration of the standard's energy, emissions and economic impacts. The research is based on data generated by builders from all across British Columbia, and bills itself as "one of the most extensive energy analyses of buildings in Canada."

The researchers conclude that meeting the requirements of the Lower Steps of the BC Energy Step Code involve only very modest construction premiums. In most situations, builders can achieve the Lower Steps for less than a 2% construction cost premium above that of a home built to the requirements of the BC Building Code. The construction cost premiums associated with meeting the requirements of Step 1 amounts to just a small fraction of a percent, the report states. In exchange, owners, occupants, and others would enjoy the benefits detailed in the "Benefits of adoption" section below.

In an effort to illustrate how the BC Energy Step Code would impact construction costs in the "real world," the study's authors produced a series of hypothetical scenarios for various building types in various cities.

=== For an apartment in a six-storey building ===
The Metrics Research report offers an example of the anticipated capital construction cost premium for a hypothetical 730 square foot unit in a six-storey apartment building in Surrey, British Columbia. Units in this hypothetical new building would sell for between CAD$270,000 and CAD$730,000.

For this building, the report says meeting the requirements of Step 1 would involve a construction cost premium of CAD$100 per unit above the cost of building to the standard modelling requirements of the BC Building Code. Meeting the requirements of Step 2 would incur A 0.5 percent construction cost premium, about CAD$790 per unit. Meeting the requirements of Step 3 adds about CAD$970 to the per-unit build cost. Finally, the researchers found that building to the very high-performance levels of Step 4 may entail a per-unit construction cost premium of CAD$4,215.

=== For a home in a six-unit row house ===
The Metrics Research report also models an example of the anticipated capital construction cost premium for a hypothetical 1,720 square feet unit built into a six-unit row house project in Surrey, B.C. Units in this hypothetical new building would sell for between CAD$550,000 and CAD$800,000.

For this building, the researchers conclude that meeting the requirements of Step 1 would involve a construction cost premium of $560 per unit above the cost of building to the BC Building Code. Meeting the requirements of Step 2 would incur a 0.4% construction cost premium, about CAD$1,250 per unit. Meeting the requirements of Step 3 adds about CAD$2,950 to the per-unit build cost. Finally, the report states that building to the highest performance levels may require non-conventional building practices; this would increase construction costs between $5,500 (Step 4) and $9,400 (Step 5) per unit, the study suggests.

== Benefits of adoption ==
Buildings built to higher energy efficiency standard have been shown to provide multiple co-benefits – to home and building owners and occupants, to industry, to the environment, and to the community.

=== For building owners and occupants ===
Owners and tenants often prefer high-performance buildings as they require less energy, reducing utility bills. Occupants also prefer them because they better manage:

- Temperature, improving comfort.
- Fresh air throughout the building, improving health.
- Soundproofing, reducing exterior noise.

=== For industry ===
The BC Energy Step Code provides industry with a clear sense of where the province is heading on energy efficiency, while giving builders a welcome level of consistency via standardized performance metrics.

=== For climate change mitigation ===
If a given community's new homes are likely to be heated with natural gas, the BC Energy Step Code will reduce the amount of that fuel they need to burn to stay comfortable. A well-insulated and well-sealed Step 3 home heated with natural gas will consume much less of the fuel when compared with one built to the minimum code requirements. This will result in fewer carbon emissions.

=== For economic development ===
The global green-building market doubles every three years and the value of the green building materials market is expected to reach $234 billion by 2019. British Columbia is already a green building design and construction leader, boasting some of highest-performing buildings in North America. Almost 12,000 people work in green architecture and related construction services in BC, while close to 9,000 work in clean energy services. The BC Energy Step Code could open up new local economic development opportunities, and helps unlock a significant export opportunity. At a November 2017 conference, an assistant deputy minister with the Province of British Columbia's Office of Housing and Construction Standards called the BC Energy Step Code "a driver of the clean economy."

== Geographic availability ==
The BC Energy Step Code is available to communities to all climate zones across the province for Part 9 buildings, and only to Climate Zone 4 (Lower Mainland and South Vancouver Island) for Part 3 buildings. Future iterations of the standard will increase coverage to all types and all areas.

All British Columbia local governments except the City of Vancouver may reference and enforce the BC Energy Step Code in their policies and bylaws. The City of Vancouver has its own building code, and its own high-performance buildings strategy, the Zero Emissions Building Plan.

== B.C. local governments referencing the standard ==
As of a March 2019 survey of 76 local governments, 14 local governments reported that they had implemented the BC Energy Step Code, and 17 local governments reported they were in the process of implementing at the time of the survey.

== Related Canadian Policies ==
In August 2017, British Columbia joined Canada's federal government, represented by Natural Resources Canada, and other provinces and territories in endorsing the Build Smart: Canada's Buildings Strategy, which is a "key driver" of the Pan-Canadian Framework on Clean Growth and Climate Change. The strategy commits signatories to develop and adopt increasingly stringent model building codes, starting in 2020, with the goal that provinces and territories adopt a "net-zero energy ready" model building code by 2030. In British Columbia, the BC Energy Step Code serves as a technical policy pathway for British Columbia to deliver on that goal.

As of mid-2018, the only other tiered building standard in Canada's is the Toronto Green Standard, which establishes sustainable design requirements for new private and public developments in that city. The Toronto Green Standard consists of stepped levels of performance measures with supporting guidelines that promote sustainable site and building design.

== Similar regulations ==
New Buildings Institute, a U.S. nonprofit organization advocating for improved energy performance in commercial buildings, describes a stretch code as "a locally mandated or incentivized code or alternative compliance path that is more ambitious than the base code, resulting in buildings that achieve higher energy savings." The institute says the codes provide an opportunity to train building and development communities in advanced practices before the underlying energy code is improved. They help accelerate market acceptance and adoption of more stringent energy efficiency codes in the future. Stretch codes can work in tandem with utility incentive programs.

In November 2017, New Buildings Institute released a set of model stretch building code strategies that target 20% better efficiency than current U.S. national building energy codes. The new 20% Stretch Code Provisions address design aspects such as envelope, mechanical, water heating, lighting and plug loads.

Other stretch codes are in place in the United States, in Massachusetts, Vermont, Oregon, New York, and California.

== See also ==
- Energy policy of Canada
- Efficient energy use
- Passive house
- California Green Building Standards Code
- List of low-energy building techniques
