= Climate change in Canada =

Emissions, impacts and responses of Canada related to climate change

Among countries that emit high levels of greenhouse gas, Canada is among the highest per person emitters.

CO_{2} emissions in Canada, 1785-2022

Climate change is greatly impacting Canada's environment and landscapes. Extreme weather has become more frequent and severe because of the continued release of greenhouse gases into the atmosphere. The number of climate change–related events, such as the 2021 British Columbia Floods and an increasing number of forest fires, has become an increasing concern over time. Canada's annual average temperature over land warmed by 1.7 °C (3.1 °F) between 1948 and 2016. The rate of warming is highest in Canada's north, the Prairies, and northern British Columbia. The country's precipitation has increased in recent years and wildfires expanded from seasonal events to year-round threats.

As of 2022, Canada was the world's 11th highest emitter of carbon dioxide (CO_{2}) and as of 2021 the 7th highest emitter of greenhouse gases. Canada has a long history of producing industrial emissions going back to the late 19th century. In 2022 transport, oil and gas extraction, and fugitive emissions together emitted 82% of the country's total emissions. From 1990 to 2022, GHG emissions from conventional oil production increased by 24%, those from multi-stage fracturing techniques increased by 56%, and emissions from oil sands production increased by 467%. This has led to criticism against Canada for committing to reducing greenhouse emissions while supporting its oil and gas industry.

Canada committed to reducing its greenhouse gas (GHG) emissions by 30% below 2005 levels by 2030 under the Paris Agreement. In July 2021, Canada enhanced the Paris Agreement plans with a new goal of reducing emissions by 40–45% below 2005 levels by 2030, enacting the Canadian Net-Zero Emissions Accountability Act. In 2019, the House of Commons voted to declare a national climate emergency in Canada. Several climate change mitigation policies have been implemented in the country, such as carbon pricing, emissions trading and climate change funding programs.

== Greenhouse gas emissions ==
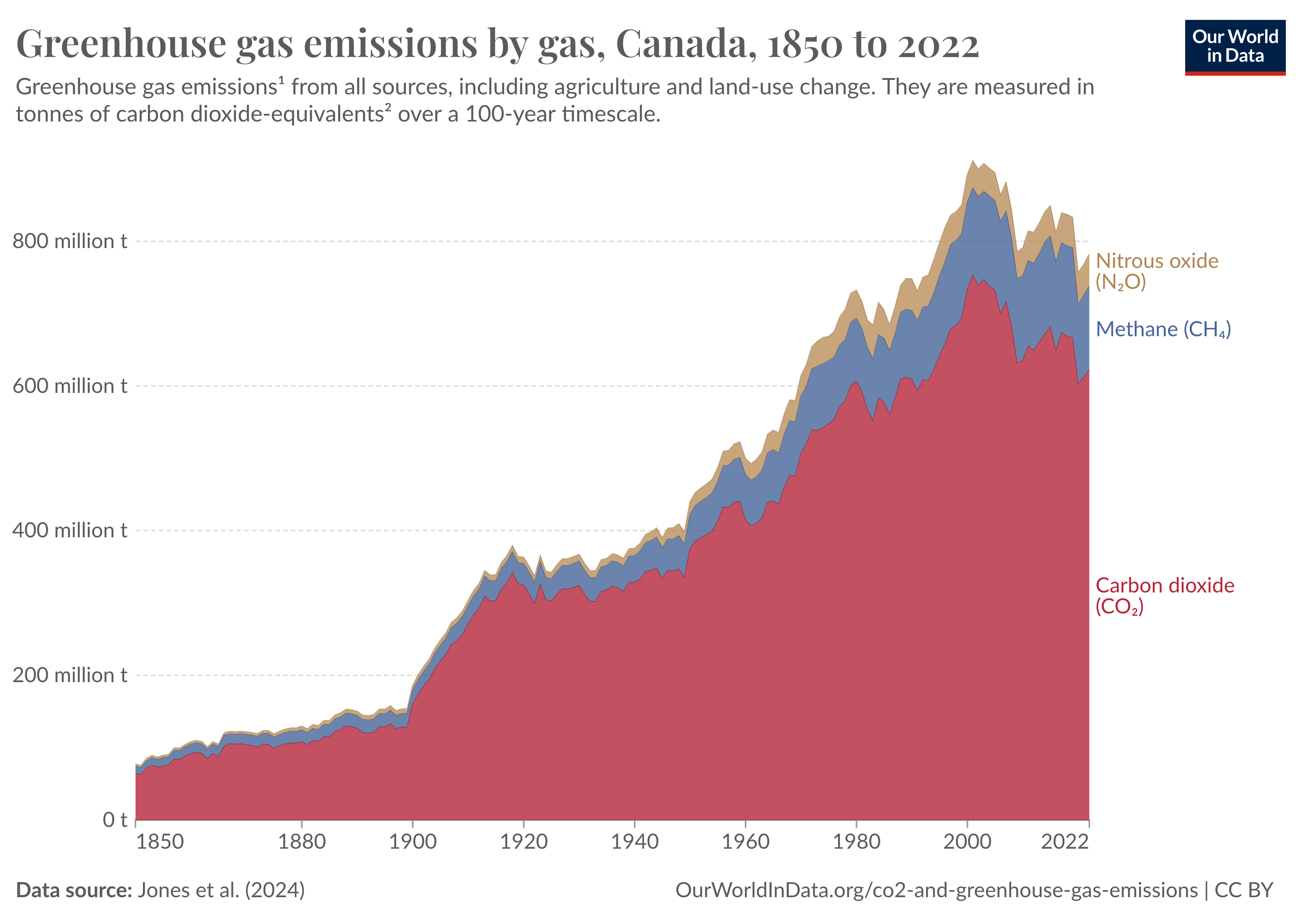
Greenhouse gas emissions by gas, Canada, 1850-2022

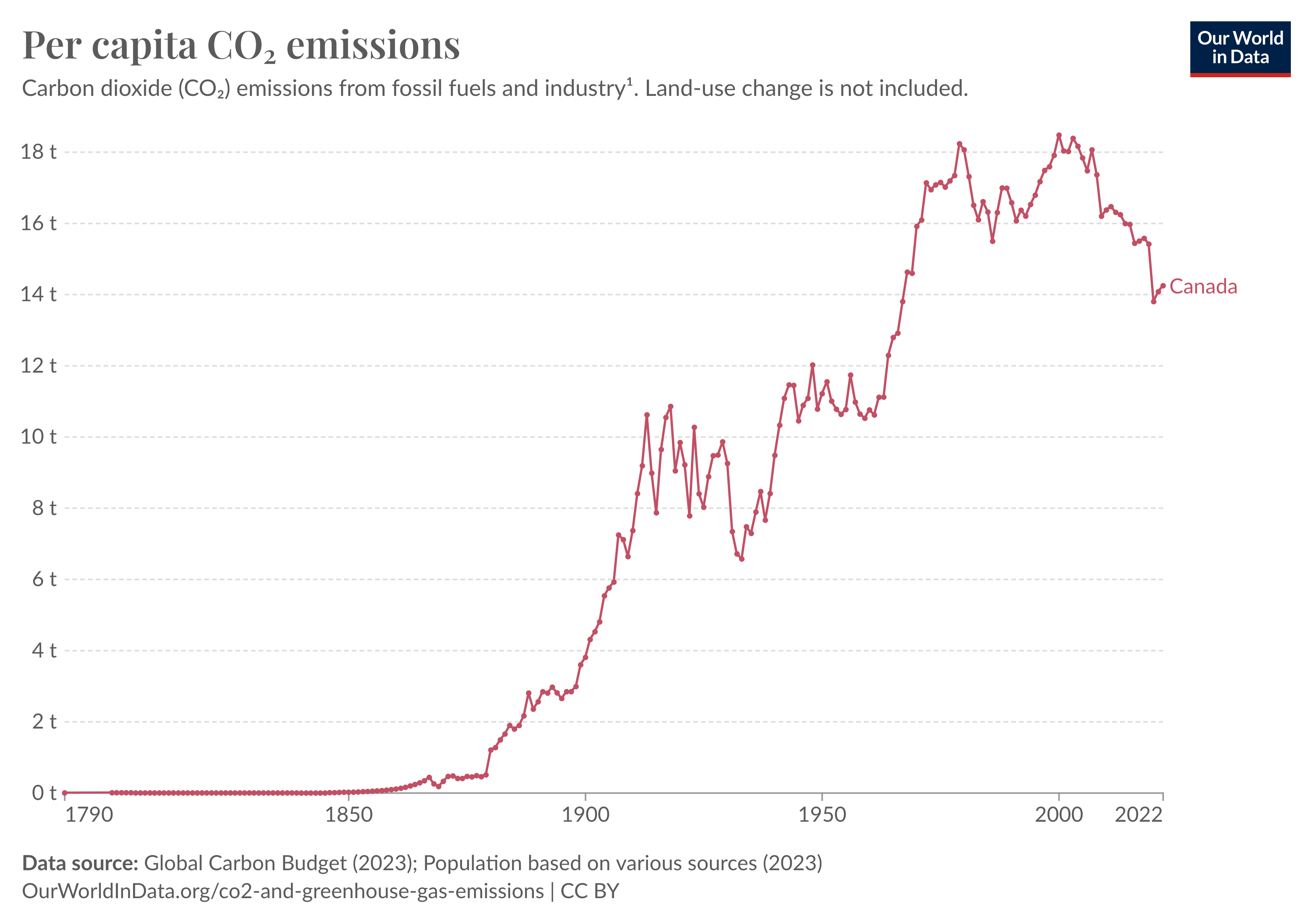
Per capita CO_{2} emissions in Canada, 1790-2022

Climate change is the result of greenhouse gas emissions, which are produced by human activity. Canada was the world's 7th largest greenhouse gas emitter in terms of GHG Inventory data, as of 2021. In 2020, Canada emitted a total of 678 million tons of carbon dioxide equivalent (Mt CO_{2}eq) into the atmosphere. This represents a decrease from 1.8% of global emissions (730 Mt CO_{2}eq) in 2005 to 1.5% in 2020, but still an increase from 602 Mt CO_{2}eq in 1990. In 2022, Canada’s GHG emissions were 708 Mteq, still below pre-pandemic (2019) emissions, but an increase of 9.3 Mt (1.3%) compared to 2021. The Canadian Climate Institute reported a net drop of about 1% in emissions during 2023, largely due to the electricity and housing sectors. In contrast, emissions from oil, gas and transportation continued to rise.

The WRI's Climate Analysis Indicators Tool estimates that, between 1950 and 2000, Canada had the highest greenhouse gas emissions per capita of any first world countries. In 2020, of all the G20 countries, Canada was second only to Saudi Arabia for greenhouse gas emissions per capita.

Canada has one of the heaviest climate debts in the world, with a very long history of producing industrial greenhouse gas emissions. As of 2021 Canada is the 10th heaviest cumulative emitter as assessed by model-based land-use mitigation measures, with 2.6% of cumulative emissions. Canada's 65.5 billion tonnes of carbon come roughly equally from use of fossil fuels and from deforestation and land use.

=== Energy consumption ===
Electricity consumption in Canada in 2017 accounted for 74 carbon dioxide equivalent Mt CO_{2}eq, or 10% of the country's emissions. This sector's climate footprint significantly reduced in recent decades due to the closure of many coal-fired power stations. As of 2017, 81% of Canada's electricity is produced by non-emitting energy sources, such as hydro, nuclear, solar or wind power.

Fossil fuels provide 19% of Canadian electric power, about half as coal (9% of the total) and the remainder a mix of natural gas and oil. Only five provinces use coal for electricity generation. Alberta, Saskatchewan, and Nova Scotia rely on coal for nearly half their generation while other provinces and territories use little or none. Alberta and Saskatchewan also use a substantial amount of natural gas. Remote communities including all of Nunavut and much of the Northwest Territories produce most of their electricity from diesel generators, at high economic and environmental cost. The federal government has set up initiatives to reduce dependence on diesel-fired electricity.

=== Transportation ===
Canada is a large country with a low population density, so transportation – often in cold weather when fuel efficiency drops – is a big part of the economy. In 2017, 24% of Canada's greenhouse gases (GHG)s came from trucks, trains, airplanes and cars.

The vast majority of Canadian emissions from transportation come from road transportation, accounting for 144 Mt CO_{2}eq, or 20% of total emissions. These originate for individual cars, but also from long-haul trucks, which are used to transport most goods across the country. In 2018, the Canadian truck industry delivered 63.7 million shipments. In 2019, Canadian factories produced 1.4 million new trucks, more than triple the Canadian car production.

The Canadian domestic aviation industry, represented largely by the country's two main airlines (Air Canada and WestJet), produced 7.1 Mt CO_{2}eq in 2017 and account for 1% of Canada's total greenhouse gas emission.

=== Fossil fuel production ===
The most pollutant industry in terms of GHG emissions in Canada is the oil and gas sector. This industry produces 195 Mt CO_{2}eq every year, which is 27% of the national total. Driven by the high emissions required for the exploitation of the tar sands in Alberta, greenhouse gas emissions from this sector increased by 84% from 1990 to 2017.

=== Industrial emissions ===
In 2017, Canadian heavy industry emitted 73 Mt CO_{2}eq, or 10% of Canada's total greenhouse gas emission. This represents a 25% drop in emissions in this category since 1990. This data is consistent with the rapid decline of manufacturing in Canada.

=== Deforestation ===
Canada's deforestation rate is one of the lowest in the world, at 0.02 percent per year. This rate of deforestation has been reducing every year since 1985.

According to Environment and Climate Change Canada (ECCC), "Harvested wood products" in Canada account for 130 Mt CO_{2}eq of greenhouse gas emissions. This would represent 18% of the country's emissions in 2017, but ECCC exclude this number from its national total. Also excluded from the total is ECCC's calculation that Canada's forests reduce greenhouse gas emissions by 150 Mt CO_{2}eq. Before 2015, ECCC used to calculate a 160 Mt CO_{2}eq reduction from its forest, a sign of their slow but continued deterioration.

== Impacts on the natural environment ==
In recent decades, Canada has experienced increased average temperatures, increased precipitation, and more extreme weather events. These trends are expected to continue over the next century. ECCC determined it was extremely likely that these changes were the result of increased greenhouse gas emissions driven by human activity.

=== Temperature and weather changes ===
Köppen climate classification map for Canada for 1980–2016

2071–2100 map under the most intense climate change scenario. Mid-range scenarios are currently considered more likely

Annual average temperatures in Canada increased by 1.7 °C between 1948 and 2016. These weather changes have not been uniform across regions. British Columbia, the Prairie provinces and Northern Canada experienced warming the most, with an annual increase of 2.3 °C for northern Canada. Meanwhile, some Maritime areas of southeast Canada experienced average warming of less than 1 °C during the same period. In addition, these trends were not uniform across the seasons. Average winter temperatures rose by 3.3 °C between 1948 and 2016 while average summer temperature only rose by 1.5 °C.

According to Environment and Climate Change Canada "warming over the 20th century is indisputable and largely due to human activities" adding "Canada's rate of warming is about twice the global rate: a 2° C increase globally means a 3 to 4 °C increase for Canada".

ECCC lists impacts of climate change consistent with global changes. Temperature-related changes include longer growing season, more heatwaves and fewer cold spells, thawing permafrost, earlier river ice break-up, earlier spring runoff, and earlier budding of trees. Meteorological changes include an increase in precipitation and more snowfall in northwest Arctic.

==== Precipitation ====
ECCC summarized annual precipitation changes to support biodiversity assessments by the Canadian Council of Resource Ministers. Evaluating records up to 2007 they observed: "Precipitation has generally increased over Canada since 1950 with the majority of stations with significant trends showing increases. The increasing trend is most coherent over northern Canada where many stations show significant increases. There is not much evidence of clear regional patterns in stations showing significant changes in seasonal precipitation except for significant decreases which tend to be concentrated in the winter season over southwestern and southeastern Canada. While the previous sentence might be technically correct in part, all seasons show increased precipitation in Canada, especially in the Winter, Spring, and Fall months. Also, increasing precipitation over the Arctic appears to be occurring in all seasons except summer."

ECCC climate specialists have assessed trends in short-duration rainfall patterns using Engineering Climate Datasets: "Short-duration (5 minutes to 24 hours) rainfall extremes are important for a number of purposes, including engineering infrastructure design, because they represent the different meteorological scales of extreme rainfall events." A "general lack of a detectable trend signal", meaning no overall change in extreme, short-duration rainfall patterns was observed in the single station analysis. In relation to design criteria used for traditional water management and urban drainage design practice (e.g., Intensity-Duration-Frequency (IDF) statistics), the evaluation "shows that fewer than 5.6% and 3.4% of the stations have significant increasing and decreasing trends, respectively, in extreme annual maximum single location observation amounts." On a regional basis, southwest and the east (Newfoundland) coastal regions generally showed significant increasing regional trends for 1- and 2-hour extreme rainfall durations. Decreasing regional trends for 5 to 15 minute rainfall amounts were observed in the St. Lawrence region of southern Quebec and in the Atlantic provinces.

==== Extreme weather events ====
The extreme weather events of greatest concern in Canada include heavy rain and snow falls, heat waves, and drought. They are linked to flooding and landslides, water shortages, forest fires, reduced air quality, as well as costs related to damage to property and infrastructure, business disruptions, and increased illness and mortality. Heat waves, including those in the summer of 2009, 2012, and 2021, are associated with increases in heat stroke and respiratory illness.

According to a 2015 study, the number of fire spread days in Canada, as a result of climate change, would increase by 35-400% by 2050, with coastal and temperate forests being most affected areas in terms of proportion. Canada is already seeing these predictions come to fruition, as the 2023 Canadian wildfire season burned over 15 million hectares due to the extreme hot and dry weathers. This is more than seven times the 40-year average.

=== Sea level rise ===
Coastal flooding is expected to increase in many areas of Canada due to global sea-level rise and local land subsidence or uplift. The country's sea level is expected to increase significantly, up to 1.6 m in some areas. The areas that are going to have the biggest strike is southwest and southeastern Canada and the waters north of Yukon. According to a Canadian Security Intelligence Service (CSIS) report, sea level changes associated with climate change could lead to significant submersion of parts of British Columbia.

=== Ecosystems ===
==== Boreal forest ====
The area of Canada that burned in 2023 wildfires was more than twice that of any prior year of record.

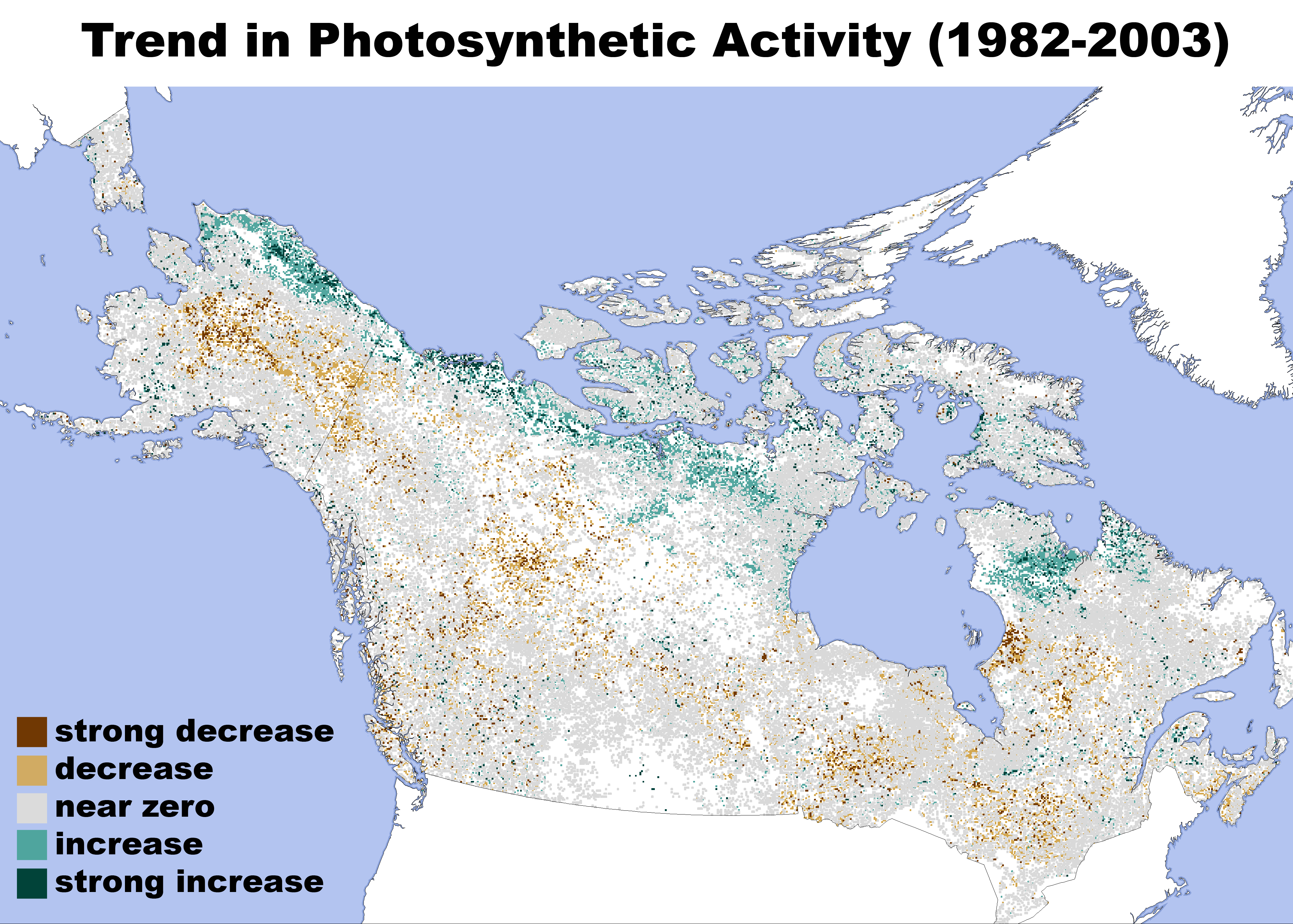
Change in Photosynthetic Activity in Northern Forests 1982–2003; NASA Earth Observatory

According to Environment Canada's 2011 annual report, there is evidence that some regional areas within the western Canadian boreal forest have increased by 2 °C since 1948. The rate of the changing climate is leading to drier conditions in the boreal forest, which leads to a whole host of subsequent issues.

As a result of the rapidly changing climate, trees are migrating to higher latitudes and altitudes (northward), but some species may not be migrating fast enough to follow their climatic habitat. Moreover, trees within the southern limit of their range may begin to show declines in growth. Drier conditions are also leading to a shift from conifers to aspen in more fire and drought-prone areas.

Climate change creates more fire-prone conditions in the Boreal forest of Canada. In 2016, Northern Alberta witnessed the effects of climate change in a dramatic manner when a "perfect storm" of El Niño and global warming contributed to the Fort McMurray wildfire, which led to the evacuation of the oil-producing town at the heart of the tar sands industry. The area has witnessed an increased frequency of wildfires, as Canada's wildfire season now starts a month earlier than it used to and the annual area burned is twice what it was in 1970. In 2023, fires in Canada were estimated to have burned seven times the average annual area of the previous 40 years, releasing 480 megatonnes of carbon, 23% of the world's wildfire-related carbon emissions for the year. By 2024, wildfires in the northwest had shifted from a seasonal occurrence to a year-round phenomenon.

As to 2019, climate change has already increased wildfires frequency and power in Canada, especially in Alberta. "We are seeing climate change in action," says University of Alberta wildland fire Prof. Mike Flannigan. "The Fort McMurray fire was 1 1/2 to six times more likely because of climate change. The 2017 record-breaking B.C. fire season was seven to 11 times more likely because of climate change."

The mountain pine beetle epidemic raged from 1996 to 2015 as a result of milder winters in the boreal forest, allowing for the proliferation of the parasite. It resulted in 18 million hectares of dead trees and economic impacts for forest-dependent communities.

==== Arctic ====
Annual mean temperature over Northern Canada increased by 2.3 °C (likely range 1.7 °C–3.0 °C), which is approximately three times the global mean warming rate. The strongest rates of warming were observed in the northernmost regions of Yukon and the Northwest Territories where annual mean temperature increases of about 3.5 °C were observed between 1948 and 2016.

Climate change melts ice and increases the mobility of the ice. In May and June 2017 dense ice – up to 8 metres (25 ft) thick – was in the waters off the northern coast of Newfoundland, trapping fishing boats and ferries.

== Socioeconomic impact ==
=== Agriculture and food production ===
During the drought of 2002, Ontario produced sufficient crops to send hay to those hit the hardest in Alberta. However it is difficult to predict that this would be repeatable in future droughts. The drought caused a deficit in income for farmers resulting from the need to buy heads of cattle at higher prices and sell them for lower prices. Based on historical forecasts alone, makes it difficult to estimate the volume of rain in an upcoming growing season; This does not allow for the agricultural sector to plan accordingly.

In Alberta there has been a trend of high summer temperatures and low summer precipitation. This has led much of Alberta to face drought conditions. Drought conditions are harming the agriculture sector of this province, mainly the cattle ranching area. When there is a drought there is a shortage of feed for cattle (hay, grain). With the shortage on crops ranchers are forced to purchase the feed at the increased prices while they can. Those who cannot afford to pay top money for feed are forced to sell their herds.

=== Health ===
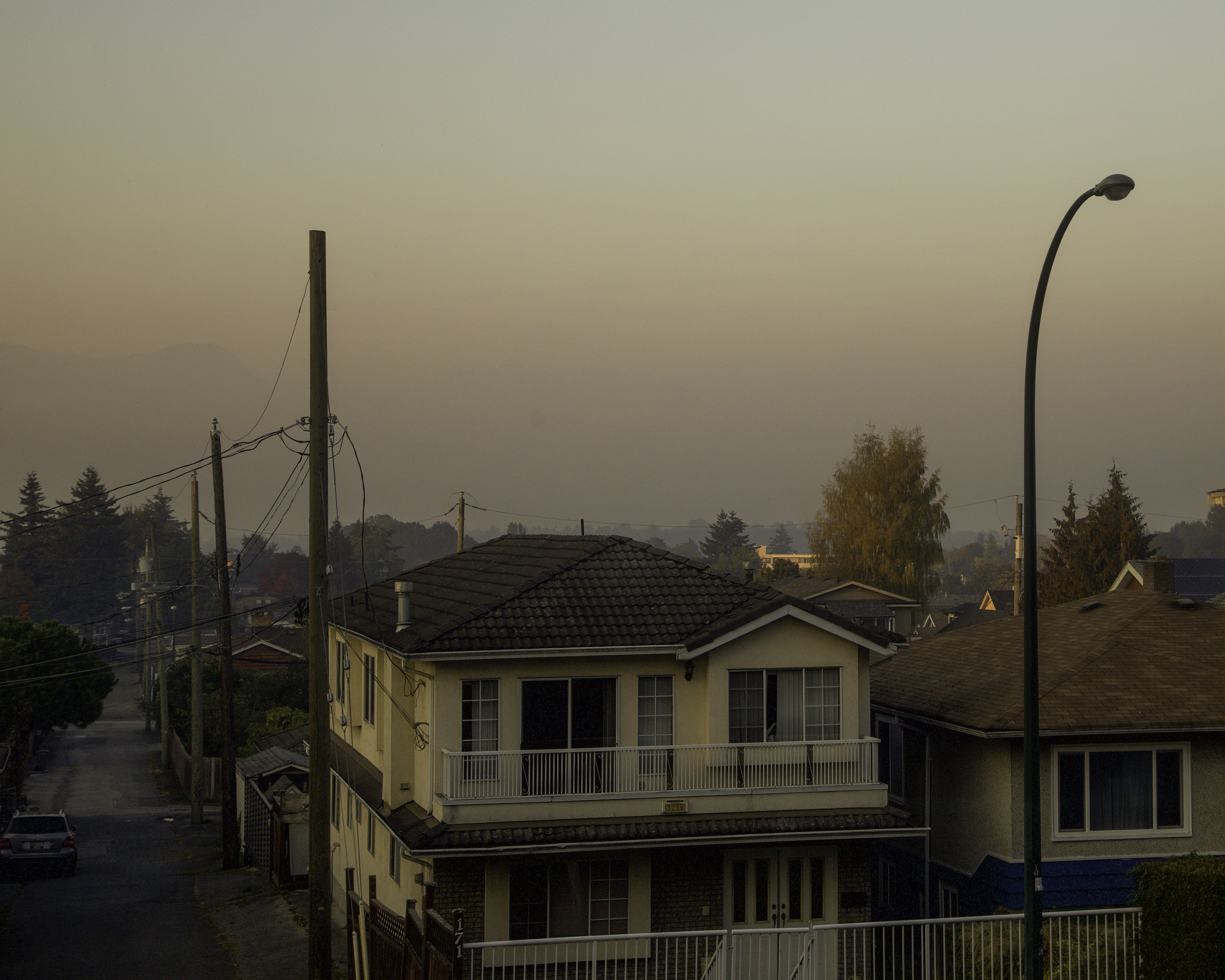
Wildfire smoke, Vancouver

The Public Health Agency of Canada reported that the number of reported Lyme disease cases in Canada increased from 144 cases in 2009 to 2,025 cases in 2017. Dr. Duncan Webster, an infectious disease consultant at Saint John Regional Hospital, links this increase in disease incidence to the increase in the population of blacklegged ticks. The tick population has increased due largely to shorter winters and warmer temperatures associated with climate change.

=== Indigenous peoples ===
Inuit who reside in Canada are facing significant difficulty maintaining their traditional food systems because of climate change. The Inuit have hunted mammals for hundreds of years. Many of their traditional economic transactions and cultural ceremonies were and still are centred around whales and other marine mammals. Climate change is causing the ocean to warm up and acidify, negatively impacting these species in these traditional areas and causing many to move elsewhere. While some believe a warming Arctic would cause food insecurity, already a problem for Canadian Inuit, to increase by taking away some of their primary food sources, others point to the resilience they have displayed in the past to changing temperatures and believe they will likely be able to adapt. Although ancestors to the modern Inuit would travel to other places in the Arctic based on these animals and adapt to changing migration routes, modern geopolitical boundaries and laws would likely prevent this from happening to the extent necessary to preserve these traditional food systems. Regardless of whether they can successfully modify their marine food systems, they will lose certain aspects of their culture. To hunt these whales and other marine mammals, they have used the same traditional tools for generations. Without these animals providing them subsistence, a core part of their culture would become obsolete.

The Inuit are also losing their access to ringed seal and polar bears, two key animals that are essential to the traditional Inuit diet. Climate change has led to drastic drops in the ringed seal population, which has led to serious harm to the Inuit subsistence winter economy. The ringed seal is the most prevalent subsistence species in all of Nunavut, with respect to both land and water. Without the ringed seal, the Inuit would lose their sense of ningiqtuq, or their cultural form of resource sharing. Ringed seal meat is one of the core meats of this type of sharing and has been utilized in this system for hundreds of years. With climate change, ningiqtuq would be drastically altered. Also, the ringed seal embodies the ideals of sharing, unity, and collectivism because of ningiqtuq. Its decline signifies loss of Inuit identity. The polar bear population is also declining because of climate change. Polar bears rely on ringed seals for food, so both of their declines are correlated. This decline is also harming ningiqtuq as polar bear meat is shared among Inuit.

For the Gwichʼin people, an Anthabaskan-speaking First Nations in Canada, caribou are central to their culture. They have coexisted with the Gwichʼin for thousands of years. As a result, their entire culture is at immediate risk. Caribou numbers are rapidly declining due to warmer temperatures and melting ice. Sarah James, a prominent Alaskan Gwichʼin activist, said, "We are the caribou people. Caribou are not just what we eat; they are who we are. They are the stories and songs and the whole way we see the world. Caribou are our life. Without caribou, we wouldn't exist."

=== Insurance claims ===
Climate change has led to increased costs from insurance claims from more severe wildfires and storms. As of September 2024, eight of Canada's 10 costliest natural disasters have occurred since 2013, though this does not account for the 2024 floods in Toronto and Montreal, nor a massive hailstorm in Calgary. The most expensive loss has been the 2016 Fort McMurray wildfire, which cost $5.96 billion.

=== Wood industry ===
Climate change causes challenges for the sustainable management and conservation of forests. It will have a direct impact on the productivity of the wood industry, as well as the health and regeneration of trees. The assisted migration of forests has been proposed as way to help the wood industry adapt to climate change.

== Mitigation and adaptation ==
=== Policies and legislation (national level) ===
==== Chretien government ====
The Government of Canada Action Plan 2000 on Climate Change was passed by the Chretien government in its 36th Canadian Parliament incarnation as part of its implementation of the 1997 Kyoto Accord.

==== Harper Government (2006–2015) ====
Under the tenure of Stephen Harper, who was Prime Minister from 2006 to 2015, the Clean Air Act was unveiled in October 2006.

In 2009, Canada's two largest provinces, Ontario and Quebec, became wary of federal policies shifting the burden of greenhouse reductions on them in order to give Alberta and Saskatchewan more room to further develop their oil sands reserves.

In 2010 Graham Saul, who represented the Climate Action Network Canada (CAN) – a coalition of 60 non-governmental organisations – commented on the 40-page CAN report "Troubling Evidence" which claimed that,

Canada's climate researchers are being muzzled, their funding slashed, research stations closed, findings ignored and advice on the critical issue of the century unsought by Prime Minister Stephen Harper's government.

— Leahy The Guardian 2010

In 2011 the Kyoto Accord was abandoned.

By 2014 award-winning American/Canadian limnologist, David Schindler, argued that Harper's administration had put "economic development ahead of all other policy objectives", in particular the environment.

It's like they don't want to hear about science anymore. They want politics to reflect economics 100 per cent – economics being only what you can sell, not what you can save.

— David Schindler 2014

==== Trudeau Government (2015–2025) ====
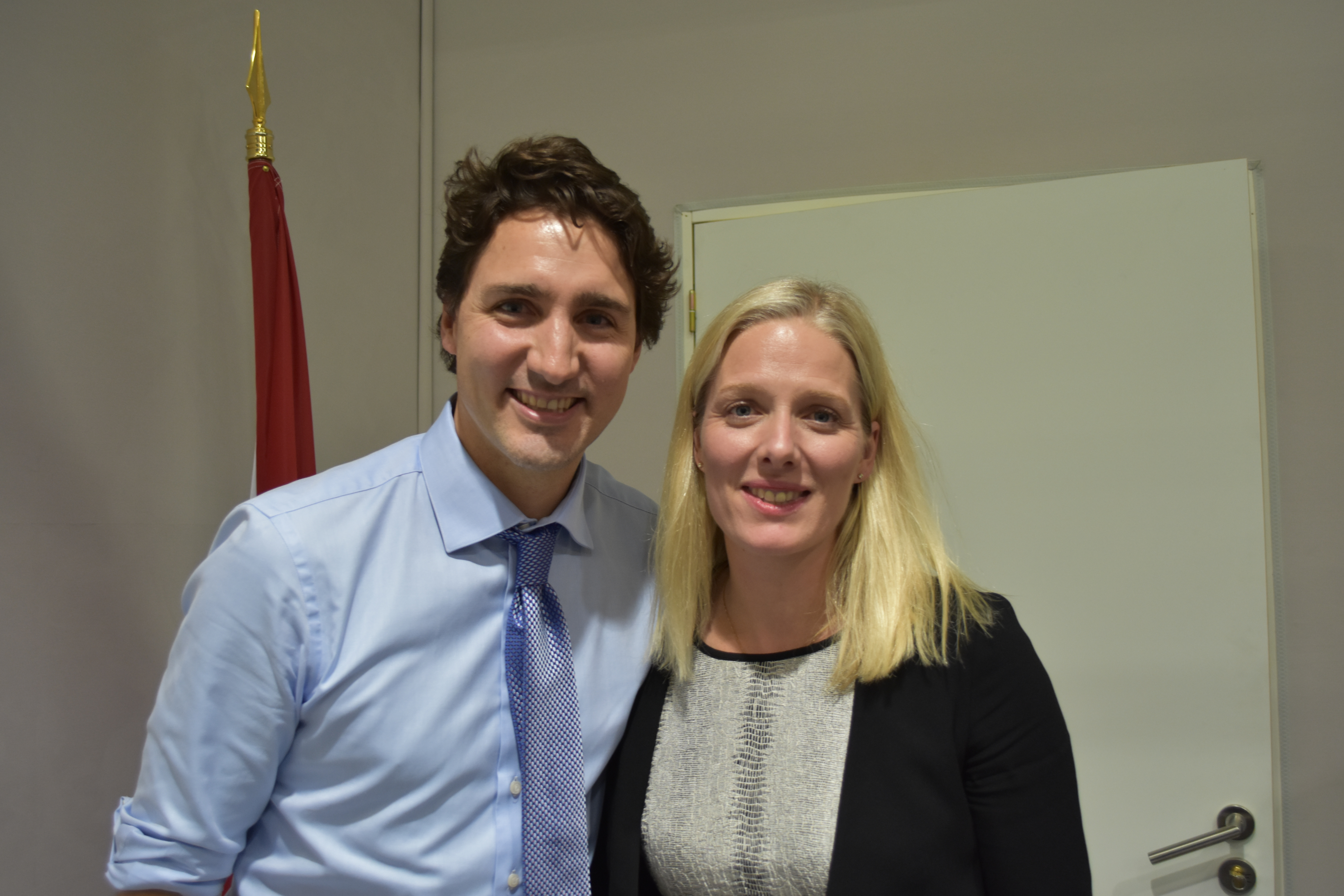
Prime Minister Justin Trudeau and Minister Catherine McKenna at the COP21 summit in Paris, on November 30, 2015

In its 2015 election platform, Justin Trudeau promised to tackle climate change, notably by phasing out fossil fuel subsidies, attending the 2015 Paris Climate Change Conference, developing a North American clean energy and environmental agreement with the United States and Mexico, and creating a $2 Billion Low Carbon Economy Trust. Trudeau made good on the three latter promises. However, he introduced new fossil fuel subsidies during his time in office.

Trudeau's Foreign affairs Minister was Stéphane Dion from 2015 to 2017. Dion is known as being very supportive of climate change policies. Catherine McKenna was Trudeau's Minister to the Environment and Climate Change from 2015 to 2019. McKenna is known for her legal work surrounding social justice.

Pan-Canadian Framework on Clean Growth and Climate Change, Trudeau's national climate strategy, was released in August 2017. Provincial premiers (except Saskatchewan and Manitoba) adopted the proposal on December 9, 2016. The core of the proposal is to implement carbon pricing regimes nationwide. The federal minister of Environment and Climate Change Canada, Catherine McKenna states that carbon taxes has been shown to be the most economical way of reducing emissions.

In April 2019, Environment commissioner Julie Gelfand described the country's lack of progress in reducing emissions as "disturbing" and noted that it was on track to miss its climate change targets.

In 2019, Environment and Climate Change Canada (ECCC) released a report called Canada's Changing Climate Report (CCCR). It is essentially a summary of the IPCC 5th Assessment Report, customised for Canada. The report states that coastal flooding is expected to increase in many areas due to global sea-level rise and local land subsidence or uplift.

The government of Justin Trudeau promised to step up the targets for the year 2030 and reach carbon neutrality in 2050. In 2020 it introduced a bill that will require the country to reach zero emission by 2050. Even though fossil fuels will be phased out in "the medium term" Trudeau has stated that the Kinder Morgan Pipeline will be built. The federal government has also approved the Woodfibre LNG Terminal in Vancouver. The Trudeau government has introduced a carbon tax. This tax was set at $20 a tonne in 2018 and will increase by $10 a year until it reaches $50 in 2022. It also places levies on natural gas, pump gas, propane, butane, and aviation fuel. Ontario Premier Doug Ford, Albertan Premier Jason Kenney (UCP) and Manitoba Premier Brian Pallister (PC) took the federal government to court on April 15, 2019, and the court ruled in favor (3–2) of the constitutionality of the carbon tax.

Following on a motion by prime minister Justin Trudeau, on June 12, 2019, the House of Commons voted to declare a national climate emergency. In December 2020 the government of Justin Trudeau introduced a bill that will require the country to reach zero emission by 2050 (Climate Change Action Plan 2001).

=== International cooperation ===
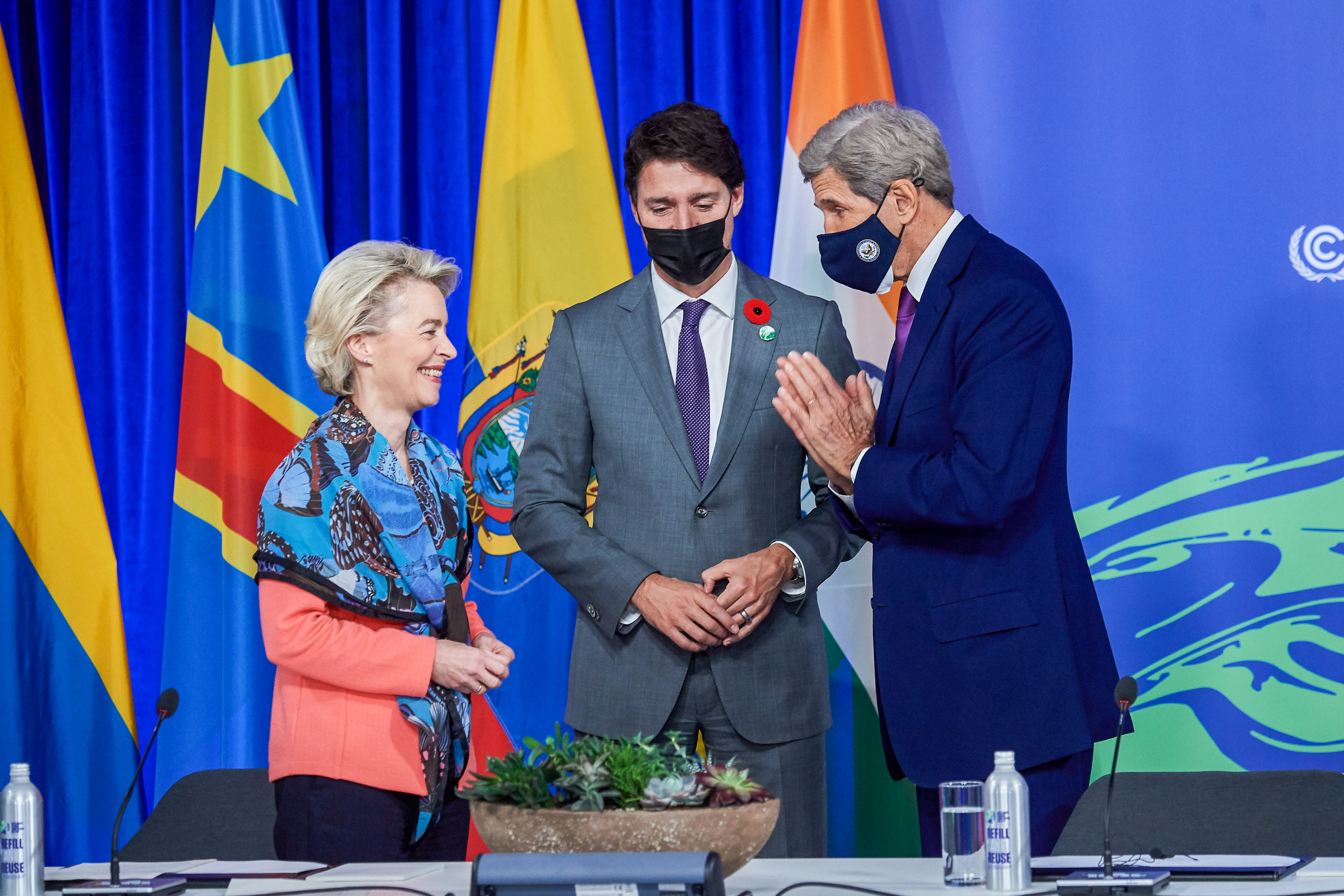
Prime minister Trudeau with Ursula von der Leyen and John Kerry at COP26

Canada is a signatory to the Kyoto Protocol. However, the Liberal government that later signed the accord took little action towards meeting Canada's greenhouse gas emission targets. Although Canada committed itself to a 6% reduction below the 1990 levels for the 2008–2012 as a signatory to the Kyoto Protocol, the country did not implement a plan to reduce greenhouse gasses emissions. Soon after the 2006 federal election, the new minority government of Conservative Prime Minister Stephen Harper announced that Canada could not and would not meet Canada's commitments. The House of Commons passed several opposition-sponsored bills calling for government plans for the implementation of emission reduction measures.

Canadian and North American environmental groups feel that Canada lacks credibility on environmental policy and regularly criticize Canada in international venues. In the last few months of 2009, Canada's attitude was criticized at the Asia-Pacific Economic Co-operation (APEC) conference, at the Commonwealth summit, and the Copenhagen conference.

In 2011, Canada, Japan and Russia stated that they would not take on further Kyoto targets. The Canadian government invoked Canada's legal right to formally withdraw from the Kyoto Protocol on December 12, 2011. Canada was committed to cutting its greenhouse emissions to 6% below 1990 levels by 2012, but in 2009 emissions were 17% higher than in 1990. Environment minister Peter Kent cited Canada's liability to "enormous financial penalties" under the treaty unless it withdrew. Canada's decision was strongly criticized by representatives of other ratifying countries, including France and China.

==== Paris Agreement ====
The Paris Agreement is a legally binding international agreement. Its main goal is to limit global warming to below 1.5 degrees Celsius, compared to pre-industrial levels. The Nationally Determined Contributions (NDCs) are the plans to fight climate change adapted for each country. Every party in the agreement has different targets based on its own historical climate records and country's circumstances and all the targets for each country are stated in their NDC.

Climate action tracker (CAT) is an independent scientific analysis that tracks government climate action and measures it against the globally agreed Paris Agreement. Climate action tracker found Canada actions to be "insufficient".

=== Policies and legislation (provincial level) ===
==== Mitigation ====
Greenhouse gas emissions (t CO2Eq) per capita (2016)
Jurisdiction	t CO2Eq
Quebec	9.55
Ontario	11.82
Prince Edward Island	12.60
British Columbia	13.34
Nunavut	13.91
Yukon	16.73
Manitoba	17.21
Nova Scotia	17.32
New Brunswick	18.74
Newfoundland and Labrador	19.24
Canada	20.14
Northwest Territories	28.72
Alberta	67.12
Saskatchewan	71.02

In the mid-2000s, mitigation measures in some provinces moved forward, though the federal government under Stephen Harper did not develop a federal monitoring and credible reduction regime. Several provincial governments established programs to reduce emissions in their respective territories. These measure were later integrated in the Pan-Canadian Framework on Clean Growth and Climate Change under the premiership of Justin Trudeau.

Ontario premier Doug Ford has been very vocal about his opposition to these programs, and abolished them when he came to office in Ontario. He maintains that the federal carbon tax imposed on his province will cause a recession. Economists have studied the issue and do not agree, citing the example of British Columbia, which has had a carbon tax since 2008 causing no economic downturn for the province.

===== Alberta =====
Alberta has an established "Climate Change Action Plan", released in 2008. The Specified Gas Emitters Regulation in Alberta made it the first jurisdiction in North America to have a price on carbon in 2007. and was renewed to 2017 with increased stringency. It requires "large final emitters", defined as facilities emitting more than 100,000 t CO_{2}eq per year, to comply with an emission intensity reduction which increases over time and caps at 12% in 2015, 15% in 2016 and 20% in 2017. Facilities have several options for compliance. They may actually make reductions, pay into the Climate Change and Emission Management Fund (CCEMF), purchase credits from other large final emitters or purchase credits from non-large final emitters in the form of offset credits. Criticisms against the intensity-based approach to pricing carbon include the fact that there is no hard cap on emissions and actual emissions may always continue to rise despite the fact that carbon has a price. Benefits of an intensity-based system include the fact that during economic recessions, the carbon intensity reduction will remain equally as stringent and challenging, while hard caps tend to become easily met, irrelevant and do not work to reduce emissions. Alberta has also been criticized that its goals are too weak, and that the measures enacted are not likely to achieve the goals. In 2015, the newly elected government committed to revising the climate change strategy.

As of 2008, Alberta's electricity sector was the most carbon-intensive of all Canadian provinces and territories, with total emissions of 55.9 million tonnes of CO_{2} equivalent in 2008, accounting for 47% of all Canadian emissions in the electricity and heat generation sector.

In November 2015, Premier Rachel Notley unveiled plans to increase the province's carbon tax to $20 per tonne in 2017, increasing further to $30 per tonne by 2018. This policy shift came about partly because of the rejection of the Keystone XL pipeline, which the premier likened to a "kick in the teeth". The province's new climate policies also include phasing out coal-fired power plants by 2030, and cutting emissions of methane by 45% by 2025.

===== British Columbia =====
BC has announced many ambitious policies to address climate change mitigation, particularly through its Climate Action Plan, released in 2008. It has set legislated greenhouse gas reduction targets of 33% below 2007 levels by 2020 and 80% by 2050. BC's revenue neutral carbon tax is the first of its kind in North America. It was introduced at $10/tonne of CO_{2}eq in 2008 and has risen by $5/tonne annual increases until it reached $30/tonne in 2012. In 2021, the carbon tax increased from $40/tonne to $45/tonne, and is scheduled to reach $50/tonne in 2022. It is required in legislation that all revenues from the carbon tax are returned to British Columbians through tax cuts in other areas.

BC's provincial public sector organizations became the first in North America to be considered carbon neutral in 2010, partly by purchasing carbon offsets. The Clean Energy Vehicles Program provides incentives for the purchase of approved clean energy vehicles and for charging infrastructure installation. There has been action across sectors including financing options and incentives for building retrofits, a Forest Carbon Offset Protocol, a Renewable and Low Carbon Fuel Standard, and landfill gas management regulation.

BC's GHG emissions have been going down, and in 2012 (based on 2010 data) BC declared it was within reach of meeting its interim target of a 6% reduction below 2007 levels by 2012. GHG emissions went down by 4.5% between 2007 and 2010, and consumption of all the main fossil fuels are down in BC as well while GDP and population have both been growing.

In 2018 it was announced that the province "after stalling on sustained climate action for several years, admitted they could not meet their 2020 target", the 33% reduction target had stalled at 6.5%. Provincially BC is the second-largest consumer of natural gas at 2.3 billion cubic feet per day.

===== Ontario =====
In August 2007, the Ontario government released Go Green: Ontario's Action Plan on Climate Change. The plan established three targets: a 6% reduction in emissions by 2014, 15% by 2020 and 80% by 2050. The government has committed to report annually on the actions it is taking to reduce emissions and adapt to climate change. With the initiatives currently in place, the government projects it will achieve 90% of the reductions needed to meet its 2014 target, and only 60% of those needed to meet the 2020 target.

The largest emissions reductions to date have come from the phase-out of coal-fired power generation by Ontario Power Generation. In August 2007, the government issued a regulation that required the end of coal burning at Ontario's four remaining coal-fired power plants by the end of 2014. Since 2003, emissions from these plants have dropped from 36.5 Mt to 4.2 Mt. In January 2013, the government announced that coal will be completely phased out one year early, by the end of 2013. The last coal generating station was closed on April 8, 2014, in Thunder Bay.

Through the Green Energy and Green Economy Act, 2009 Ontario implemented a feed-in tariff to promote the development of renewable energy generation. Ontario is also a member of the Western Climate Initiative. In January 2013, a discussion paper was posted on the Environmental Registry seeking input on the development of a greenhouse gas emissions reduction program for industry.

Over the years, transportation emissions have continued to increase. Growing from 44.8 Mt in 1990 to 59.5 Mt in 2010, transportation is responsible for the largest amount of greenhouse gas emissions in the province. Efforts to reduce these emissions include investing in public transit and providing incentives for the purchase of electric vehicles.

The government also recognizes the need for climate change adaptation and, in April 2011, released Climate Ready: Ontario's Adaptation Strategy and Action Plan 2011–2014.

As required by the Environmental Bill of Rights, 1993, the Environmental Commissioner of Ontario does an independent review and reports annually to the Legislative Assembly of Ontario on the progress of activities in the province to reduce greenhouse gas emissions.

On June 7, 2018, the Progressive Conservative Party of Ontario under Doug Ford was elected to a majority government. Since then there has been a great deal of controversy regarding the environmental policies of his government. Among the changes to environmental policy by Ford's government were the withdrawal of Ontario from the Western Climate Initiative emissions trading system, which had been implemented by the previous Liberal government, and eliminating the office of the Environmental Commissioner of Ontario, a non-partisan officer of the Legislative Assembly of Ontario charged with enforcing Ontario's Environmental Bill of Rights (EBR). The Ford government released a report indicating that the duties of the Environmental Commissioner would be transferred to the Auditor General of Ontario. Other criticisms levelled by Mike Schreiner of the Green Party of Ontario include cuts to the Ministry of the Environment, Conservation and Parks as well as making unspecified changes to the Endangered Species Act.

===== Quebec =====
Greenhouse gas emissions increased by 3.8% in Quebec between 1990 and 2007, to 85.7 megatonnes of CO_{2} equivalent before falling to 81.7 in 2015. At 9.9 tonnes per capita, Quebec's emissions are well below the Canadian average (20.1 tonnes) and accounted for 11.1% of Canada's total in 2015.

Emissions in the electricity sector spiked in 2007, due to the operation of the TransCanada Energy combined cycle gas turbine in Becancour. The generating station, Quebec's largest source of greenhouse gas emissions that year, released 1,687,314 tonnes of CO_{2} equivalent in 2007 or 72.1% of all emissions from the sector and 2% of total emissions. The plant was closed in 2008 in 2009 and in 2010.

Between 1990 – the reference year of the Kyoto Protocol – and 2006, Quebec's population grew by 9.2% and Quebec's GDP of 41.3%. The emission intensity relative to GDP declined from 28.1% during this period, dropping from 4,500 to 3,300 tonnes of CO_{2} equivalent per million dollars of gross domestic product (GDP).

In May 2009, Quebec became the first jurisdiction in the Americas to impose an emissions cap after the Quebec National Assembly passed a bill capping emissions from certain sectors. The move was coordinated with a similar policy in the neighboring province of Ontario and reflects the commitment of both provinces as members of the Western Climate Initiative.

On November 23, 2009, the Quebec government pledged to reduce its greenhouse gas emissions by 20% below the 1990 base year level by 2020, a goal similar to that adopted by the European Union. The government intends to achieve its target by promoting public transit, electric vehicles and intermodal freight transport. The plan also calls for the increased use of wood as a building material, energy recovery from biomass, and a land use planning reform. As of 2015 the rate of emissions has been reduced by 8.8%. In order to encourage electrification of the transportation sector, Quebec has introduced numerous policies to promote the purchase of electric vehicles. In 2018, the proportion of electric vehicles among all new passenger car sales in Quebec rose to 9.8%.

In January 2026, the government updated the goal to 37.5% below the 1990 base year, but brought the goal date further to 2035.

==== Adaptation ====
Many climate change adaptation policies are within provincial government's jurisdiction. However, adaptation is currently low in their list of environmental priorities, and most provinces have no climate adaptation plan at all.

===== Assisted migration of forests =====
However, some provinces implemented assisted colonization policies to guide their forests to their future optimal range. As the climate gets warmer, tree species' become less adapted to the conditions of their historical southern or downhill range and more adapted to the climatic condition of areas north or uphill of their historical range. In the late 2000s and early 2010s, the Canadian provinces of Alberta and British Columbia modified their tree reseeding guidelines to account for this phenomenon. British Columbia even gave the green light for the relocation of a single species, the Western Larch, 1000 km northward.

=== Policy assessments ===
According to data in 2021, for giving the world a 50% chance of avoiding a temperature rise of 2 degrees or more Canada should increase its climate commitments by 57%. For a 95% chance it should increase the commitments by 160%. For giving a 50% chance of staying below 1.5 degrees Canada should increase its commitments by 215%.

== Society and culture ==
=== Activism ===
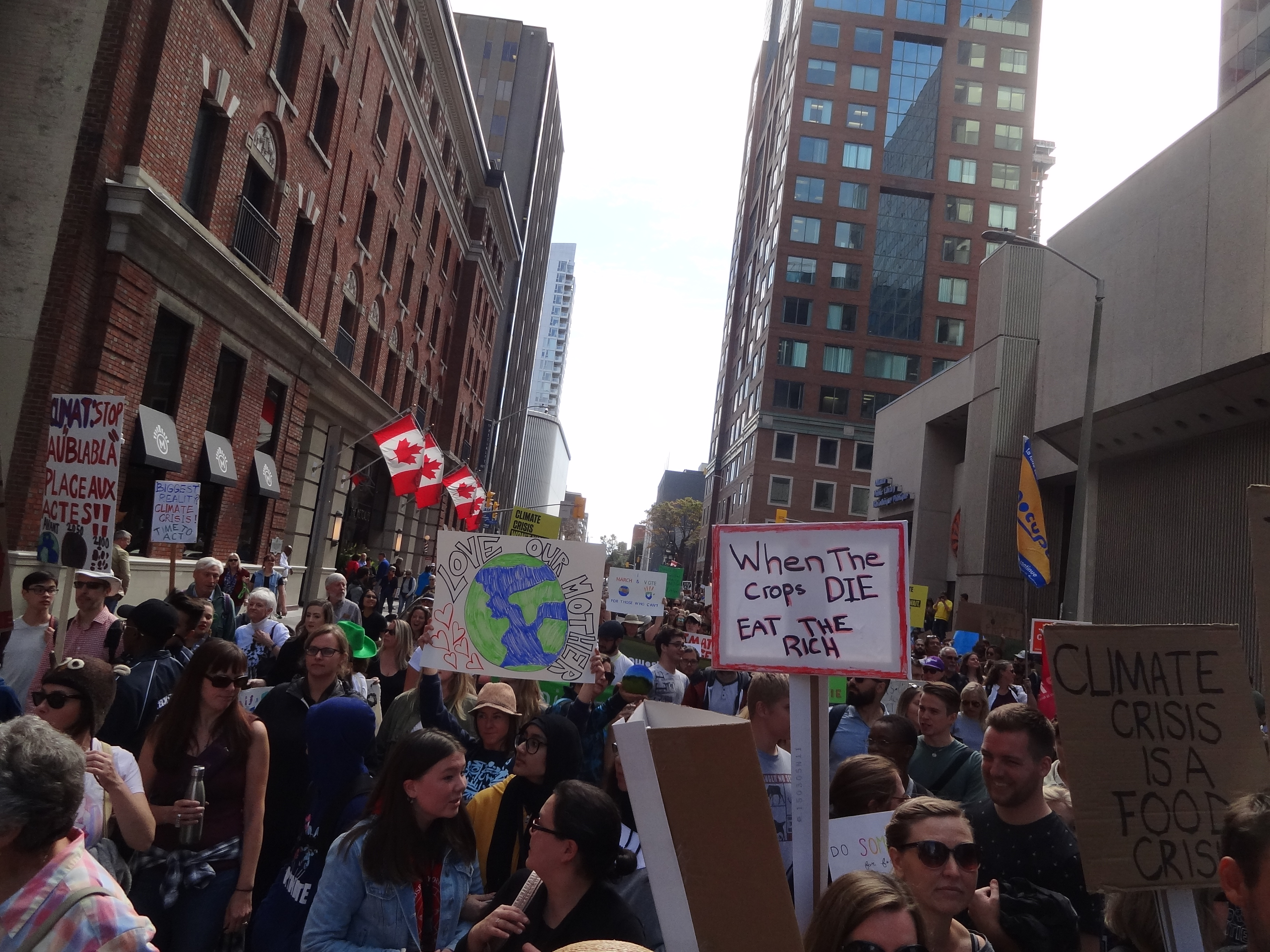
Protesters at the September 2019 climate strike in Ottawa

The Canadian Wildlife Federation (CWF), one of the largest conservation organisations in the country, lobbies for climate change mitigation. According to CWF the organization recognized the need for action in 1977. It published Checkerspot, a now discontinued biannual climate change magazine.

Some Canadian groups have also lobbied for fossil fuel divestment.

=== Public opinion ===
According to a 2020 survey of the Canadian Nuclear Association, climate change concerns Canadians more than any other issue.

In a 2021 survey, Nanos Research found that 30% of Canadians reported that climate change was their top worry, 2nd place behind inflation (36%) and ahead of the COVID-19 pandemic (29%).

Canadians think the threat posed by climate change is higher than their United States counterparts do, but slightly below the median opinion of other nations included in a Pew Research Center survey in 2018. However the majority of Canadians in every electoral riding of every province in Canada believe that climate is changing.

Rates of acceptance (belief) for ongoing climate change are highest in British Columbia and Quebec, and lowest in the prairie provinces of Alberta and Saskatchewan. In a survey published by the University of Montreal and colleagues, national belief that the earth was warming was at 83%, while 12% of respondents said the earth was not warming. However, when asked if this warming is due to human activity, only 60% of respondents said "yes". These numbers are consistent with a 2015 survey that showed 85% of Canadians believed the earth was warming, while only 61% felt this warming was due to human activity. Canadian public opinion that human activity is responsible for global warming slightly declined overall from 2007 to 2015. When asked whether their province has already felt the effects of climate change, 70% of Canadians responded "yes". This result was based on a majority of respondents in almost all electoral ridings. At the same time, the three ridings in Alberta where opinion was lowest each polled at 49% "yes", which is just below a majority. National support for action to stop climate change sits at 58%, with similar levels of support for either a cap and trade system (58%) or a direct tax on carbon emissions (54%).

A December 2018 Ipsos-Reid poll was conducted to gauge the public's opinion of Doug Ford's environmental policies in Ontario. The poll results were as follows:

- Negative – 45%
- Positive – 27%
- Neutral – 28%

In 2021, in the midst of the COP26, a poll concluded that 25% of Canadians were of the opinion that international conferences on climate change were useful to fight climate change.

A 2012 Canadian poll, found that 32% of Canadians said they believe climate change is happening because of human activity, while 54% said they believe it's because of human activity and partially due to natural climate variation. 9% believe climate change is occurring due to natural climate variation, and only 2% said they do not believe climate change is occurring at all.

=== Media coverage ===
During the Harper government (2006-2015), Canadian media, mostly notably the CBC, made little effort to balance the claims of global warming deniers with voices from science. The Canadian coverage appeared to be driven more by national and international political events rather than the changes to carbon emissions or various other ecological factors. The discourse was dominated by matters of government responsibility, policy-making, policy measures for mitigation, and ways to mitigate climate change; with the issue coverage by mass media outlets continuing to act as an important means of communicating environmental concerns to the general public, rather than introducing new ideas about the topic itself.

Within various provincial and language media outlets, there are varying levels of articulation regarding scientific consensus and the focus on ecological dimensions of climate change. Within Quebec, specifically, these outlets are more likely to position climate change as an international issue, and to link climate change to social justice concerns in order to depict Quebec as a pro-environmental society.

Across various nations, including Canada, there has been an increased effort in the use of celebrities in climate change coverage, which is able to gain audience attention, but in turn, it reinforces individualized rather than structural interpretations of climate change responsibility and solutions.

== Statistics on greenhouse gas emissions ==
Greenhouse gas emissions from International Panel on Climate Change sectors in Canada, 2005–2019
		in Mt CO_{2} equivalent								Change 1990–2019 (%)	Change 2005–2019 (%)	Share in 2019 (%)
		1990	2005	2014	2015	2016	2017	2018	2019	Change 1990–2019 (%)	Change 2005–2019 (%)	Share in 2019 (%)
Energy (stationary combustion sources)	Public electricity and heat generation	95	125	84	87	81	78	70	69	▼27%	▼45%	9%
Energy (stationary combustion sources)	Petroleum-refining industries	17	20	18	18	16	14	15	15	▼12%	▼25%	2%
Energy (stationary combustion sources)	Oil and gas extraction	31	63	96	97	99	102	106	105	▲339%	▲66%	14%
Energy (stationary combustion sources)	Mining	4.7	4.3	5.1	4.6	4.3	4.7	6.3	6.4	▲36%	▲49%	1%
Energy (stationary combustion sources)	Manufacturing industries	56	48	45	44	42	42	44	42	▼25%	▼14%	6%
Energy (stationary combustion sources)	Construction	1.9	1.5	1.3	1.3	1.3	1.3	1.4	1.4	▼26%	▼7%	0%
Energy (stationary combustion sources)	Commercial & institutional	26	33	31	30	30	32	33	34	▲30%	▲3%	5%
Energy (stationary combustion sources)	Residential	44	46	46	43	39	41	45	42	▼4%	▼9%	6%
Energy (stationary combustion sources)	Agriculture and forestry	2.4	2.2	3.8	3.6	3.8	3.7	3.8	3.7	▲54%	▲68%	1%
Energy (transport)	Aviation	7.5	7.7	7.6	7.6	7.5	7.9	8.7	8.5	▲13%	▲12%	1%
Energy (transport)	Road transportation	84	130	141	143	145	148	154	153	▲82%	▲18%	21%
Energy (transport)	Railways	6.9	6.6	7.5	7.1	6.5	7.5	7.6	7.7	▲12%	▲17%	1%
Energy (transport)	Marine	3.1	4.0	3.5	3.4	3.5	3.6	3.8	4.4	▲42%	▲10%	1%
Energy (transport)	Other transportation	44	42	39	40	39	40	43	43	▼2%	▲2%	6%
Energy (fugitives sources)	Coal mining	2.8	1.4	1.3	1.1	1.3	1.2	1.3	1.4	▼50%	-	0%
Energy (fugitives sources)	Oil and gas	46	60	61	58	53	54	53	52	▲13%	▼13%	7%
Total Energy Uses		472	591	584	585	566	578	588	589	▲25%	▼0%	81%
Industrial processes and product use		57	57	54	53	54	53	54	54	▼5%	▼5%	7%
Agriculture	Enteric fermentation	22	31	24	24	24	24	24	24	▲1%	▼23%	3%
Agriculture	Manure management	6.1	8.8	7.7	7.8	7.9	7.9	7.9	7.9	▲30%	▼10%	1%
Agriculture	Agricultural soils	17	19	23	24	25	24	25	25	▲47%	▲32%	3%
Agriculture	Liming, urea application and other carbon-containing fertilizers	1.2	1.4	2.5	2.6	2.5	2.5	2.6	2.6	▲117%	▲86%	0%
Waste		26	31	27	27	27	27	27	28	▲8%	▼10%	4%
Total non-energy sources		130	148	139	138	141	138	140	141	▲8%	▼5%	19%
Total GHG		602	739	723	723	707	716	728	730	▲21%	▼1%	100%

Greenhouse gas emissions in Canada by economic sector, 1990–2019
	in Mt CO_{2} equivalent									Change 1990–2018 (%)	Share in 2018 (%)
	1990	2005	2013	2014	2015	2016	2017	2018	2019	Change 1990–2018 (%)	Share in 2018 (%)
Oil and gas	106	158	185	191	191	187	188	193	191	▲82%	26%
Electricity	95	119	81	77	81	75	73	64	61	▼34%	9%
Transportation	121	161	174	172	172	174	179	186	186	▲54%	26%
Heavy Industry	97	87	79	80	79	77	76	78	77	▼20%	11%
Buildings	74	86	86	89	86	82	85	92	91	▲24%	13%
Agriculture	57	72	73	71	71	72	71	73	73	▲28%	10%
Waste & others	53	46	43	41	41	41	42	42	51	▼21%	6%
National GHG Total	603	730	721	721	720	706	714	729	730	▲21%	100.0%

Greenhouse gas emissions by Canadian province/territory, 1990–2019
	in Mt CO_{2} equivalent									Change 1990–2019 (%)	Change 2005-2019 (%)	Share in 2019 (%)
	1990	2005	2013	2014	2015	2016	2017	2018	2019	Change 1990–2019 (%)	Change 2005-2019 (%)	Share in 2019 (%)
Newfoundland and Labrador	9.8	11	11	11	11	11	11	11	11	▲12%	▲5.4%	1.5%
Prince Edward Island	2	2	1.8	1.7	1.6	1.7	1.7	1.7	1.8	▼15%	▼14%	0.25%
Nova Scotia	20	23	18	17	17	16	16	17	16	▼20%	▼30%	2.19%
New Brunswick	16	20	15	14	14	14	14	13	12	▼25%	▼38%	1.64%
Quebec	87	88	80	78	79	78	80	83	84	▼4%	▼4.4%	11.51%
Ontario	179	206	167	165	163	160	155	165	163	▼9%	▼21%	22.31%
Manitoba	18	21	21	21	21	21	21	22	23	▲28%	▲10%	3.15%
Saskatchewan	44	68	72	75	77	75	77	76	75	▲70%	▲10%	10.27%
Alberta	173	235	272	277	276	265	272	273	276	▲60%	▲17%	37.81%
British Columbia	52	63	60	60	59	62	63	66	66	▲27%	▲4.3%	9.04%
Yukon	0.5	0.6	0.6	0.5	0.5	0.5	0.5	0.6	0.7	▲40%	▲17%	0.10%
Northwest Territories	n/a	1.6	1.3	1.5	1.7	1.6	1.3	1.2	1.4	n/a	▼13%	0.19%
Nunavut	n/a	0.6	0.8	0.7	0.6	0.7	0.7	0.7	0.7	n/a	▲17%	0.10%
Canada	603	739	721	723	723	707	716	728	730	▲21%	▼1.1%	100%

== See also ==
- Arctic Climate Impact Assessment
- Climate change in the Arctic
- Climate change and indigenous peoples
- Environmental issues in Canada
- Hard Choices: Climate Change in Canada (2004 book)
- List of countries by greenhouse gas emissions per capita
- Renewable energy in Canada
- Regional effects of global warming
- Plug-in electric vehicles in Canada

== Report ==
- Bush, E. and Lemmen, D.S., editors (2019): Canada's Changing Climate Report; Government of Canada, Ottawa, ON. 444 p.
