= Ligeti (surname) =

Ligeti is a Hungarian surname. Notable persons with the surname include:

- András Ligeti (1953-2021), Hungarian violinist and conductor
- Antal Ligeti (1823–1890), Hungarian landscape painter
- Eva Ligeti (born 1950), Canadian lawyer and the first Environmental Commissioner of Ontario
- György Ligeti (1923–2006), Hungarian composer
- Lajos Ligeti (1902–1987), Hungarian orientalist and philologist
- Lukas Ligeti (born 1965), son of György Ligeti and composer/percussionist
- Miklós Ligeti (1871–1944), Hungarian sculptor

== See also ==
- Ligeti Ridge, an undersea ridge in the Southern Ocean
- Ligeti Stratos, 1980s Australian ultralight aircraft
- Liget
- Ted Ligety
