= Pan-Canadian Framework on Clean Growth and Climate Change =

Canada's national climate strategy

The Pan-Canadian Framework on Clean Growth and Climate Change (PCFCGCC or PCF; French: Cadre pancanadien sur la croissance propre et les changements climatiques, CPCPCC or CPC), Canada's national climate strategy, was released in August 2017 by the Government of Canada. Provincial premiers (except Saskatchewan and Manitoba) adopted the PCF on December 9, 2016.

== Background ==
According to a London School of Economics (LSE) December 2016 paper, "The Pan-Canadian Framework on Clean Growth and Climate Change (PCFCGCC)" provided an extensive description of "executive, mitigation and adaptation" strategies for a clean economy. that "lean[-ed] heavily on carbon pricing". The Canadian federal government's Pan-Canadian Framework on Clean Growth and Climate Change and promoted sustainable building programs.

The PCFCGCC's four main interrelated pillars are ""carbon pollution pricing", "complementary actions to reduce emissions", "adaptation and resilience", and "clean technology, innovation and jobs". The document also includes sections on "reporting and oversight" and "federal engagement and partnership with Indigenous Peoples."

== Carbon pollution pricing ==
Carbon pricing is a major keystone component of the Pan-Canadian Framework, which relies on existing provincial carbon pricing systems and a federal backstop to ensure that equivalent levels of carbon pricing apply across Canada.

== Adaptation and resilience ==
=== BRACE ===
"Building Regional Adaptation Capacity and Expertise (BRACE) is a program that is increasing the ability of communities, organizations, small and medium-sized enterprises and practitioners to access, use, and apply knowledge and tools on climate change adaptation in their work."

== Clean technology, innovation and jobs ==
=== Zero-energy building ===
Canada's Buildings Strategy, Build Smart, that focuses on increasing energy efficiency in buildings in pursuit of eventually attaining zero-energy buildings, is another key driver of Pan-Canadian Framework on Clean Growth and Climate Change.

The federal government represented by Natural Resources Canada, the provinces and territories endorsed Build Smart: Canada's Buildings Strategy in December 2017. The Build Smart strategy commits those who sign the agreement to a "net-zero energy ready" model building code by 2030 and to development and adoption of stringent model building codes starting in 2020.

In August 2017, British Columbia joined Canada's federal government, represented by Natural Resources Canada, and other provinces and territories in endorsing the Build Smart: Canada's Buildings Strategy. The strategy commits signatories to develop and adopt increasingly stringent model building codes, starting in 2020, with the goal that provinces and territories adopt a "net-zero energy ready" model building code by 2030. In British Columbia, the BC Energy Step Code serves as a technical policy pathway for British Columbia to deliver on that goal.

=== Fugitive gas emissions ===
The Framework includes plans that would reduce oil and gas sector emissions by 2025 to 40% below 2012 levels.

== Nunavut ==
According to a November 2017 article in the journal Climatic Change, the federal government placed "increased emphasis" on climate change as evident in the 2016 Pan-Canadian Framework on Clean Growth and Climate Change. While Nunavut had already made notable progress around in regards to "adaptation planning", which included examples of "adaptation champions", "pressing socio-economic problems", along with "institutional and governmental barriers", have impeded implementation of adaptation. The authors of the article noted that, at the federal level, "there is evidence of high-level leadership on adaptation, the creation of adaptation programs, and allocation of funds for adaptation." The focus they said "has been mostly on researching adaptation options as opposed to supporting actual actions or policy change." The authors recommended that the Government of Nunavut implement "legislative and regulatory requirements for adaptation" to increase "emphasis on adaptation". The Government of Nunavut created a "strategic planning document on adaptation—Upagiaqtavut, which is "mainstreamed for decision making across departments". According to the article, the role of the federal government with its "complex, multilevel political systems" under Canadian federalism, of "supporting provinces and territories on adaptation" which is outlined in the Pan-Canadian Framework, includes "providing information, coordination, and facilitation to draw attention to adaptation, engage public and private actors, and build support for policy objectives." The Pan-Canadian Framework is a federal commitment to collaborate with "communities and governments to create a Northern Adaptation Strategy for Canada’s Arctic territories."

== See also ==
- Climate change in Canada
- Technological Innovation for Climate Change Mitigation
- BC Energy Step Code
- Energy policy of Canada
- Efficient energy use
- Passive house
- California Green Building Standards Code
