= Eva Ligeti =

Environmental Commissioner of Ontario
- In office 1994–1999
- Succeeded by: Ivy Wile (interim)

Personal details
- Occupation: Lawyer

Eva Bobbi Ligeti (born 1950) is a Canadian lawyer and academic, with a particular focus on environmental law and regulation. She was the first Environmental Commissioner of Ontario.

== History ==
Eva Ligeti was appointed in 1994 as the first Environmental Commissioner of Ontario. Her selection was made by an all-party committee of Ontario provincial legislature.

Ligeti remained Commissioner until 1999, reviewing the government's compliance with the Environmental Bill of Rights and reporting to an all-party committee of the Ontario legislature. In her annual report of April, 1999, she warned of a public health crisis as a result of high levels of air pollution. Her five-year appointment was not renewed, as she was so advised by the government in August 1999. Her appointment had at that time already been subject to a three-month extension, based on the Legislature not being in a position to discuss a replacement, due to the 1999 Ontario general election in June.

The termination of Ligeti's appointment was controversial, in that it was made by order of Cabinet. Opposition members of the legislature objected, on the basis that Ligeti was an Officer of the Legislature, similar to the Provincial Auditor. Opposition members argued that her termination should therefore have been by a vote of Members of the Provincial Legislature. Ligeti was succeeded on an interim basis by Ivy Wile, a retired assistant deputy minister of the Ontario Ministry of the Environment, until the appointment of Gord Miller in 2000.

Ligeti is a past principal at Seneca College of Applied Arts and Technology and former chair of its School of Legal and Public Administration. A lawyer, Ligeti focussed on civil litigation and administration law in her practice with Iler, Campbell and Associates. She has served as legal counsel to the Canadian Environmental Law Association. Ligeti was executive director of the Clean Air Partnership from 2000 - 2014.
