= National Building Code of Canada =

Building code recommendation

The National Building Code of Canada is the model building code of Canada. It is issued by the National Research Council of Canada. As a model code, it has no legal status until it is adopted by a jurisdiction that regulates construction.

== History ==
The Constitution of Canada includes the regulation of building construction as a provincial responsibility. In a few cases, municipalities have been given the historic right of writing their own building code. In the early years of regulating building construction, this caused a patchwork of building codes across Canada.

In 1941, the federal government of Canada published the first National Building Code. This was adopted by the various provinces and municipalities in Canada during the next 20 years.

On 1 August 1947, the Division of Building Research, later named the Institute for Research in Construction (NRC-IRC) and today known as NRC Construction Research Centre, was established to provide a research service to the construction industry and to help ensure affordable and safe housing for a growing population of Canadians. Its founding head was Robert Legget. The new organization was also given the mandate to lead the development of the National Building Code of Canada. Since then, NRC's Construction Research Centre has grown to encompass emergent areas of research in support of the Canadian construction sector. Early photographs of activities are available in the archives.

The Northern Research Program was housed at the Division of Building Research over the period from 1950 to 1986, and information gleaned from the Building Materials Section in York Redoubt made its way into the Code.

Since 1960, there has been a revised document about every five years up to 1995. The 2000 edition of the building code was supposed to be an objective or performance-based building. However, this took considerably longer to write than foreseen and the next edition of the National Building Code of Canada was not published until 2005. The 2010 National Model Construction Codes was published on 29 November 2010. and the National Building Code of Canada 2010 incorporates energy efficiency requirements.

The first National Farm Building Code of Canada (NFBC) was first published in 1960. The Model National Energy Codes for Buildings and Houses were first published in 1997.

The Historical National Construction Codes on-line in PDF format is a single collection provided by the NRC of the English and French editions of all Code documents published between 1941 and 1998.

On behalf of the Canadian Commission on Building and Fire Codes (CCBFC) the National Research Council (NRC) Canadian Codes Centre publishes national model codes documents that set out minimum requirements relating to their scope and objectives. These include the National Building Code, the National Fire Code, the National Plumbing Code, the National Energy Code of Canada for Buildings (NECB) and other documents. The Canadian Standards Association (CSA) publishes other model codes that address electrical, gas and elevator systems.

Requirements on the specification of structural wood products and wood building systems is set forth in the National Building Code which is concerned with health, safety, accessibility and the protection of buildings from fire or structural damage. The Code applies mainly to new construction, but also aspects of demolition, relocation, renovation and change of building use. The current NBCC was published in 2015, and is usually updated on a five-year cycle. The next update began in 2020. While final public review of proposed changes to the 2015 edition ran from January 13-March 13, 2020, completion was delayed due to covid-19; reportedly the updated edition will be published in December 2021.

== Implementation ==
The National Building Code is the model building code that forms the basis for all of the provincial building codes. Some jurisdictions create their own code based on the National Building Code, other jurisdictions have adopted the National Building often with supplementary laws or regulations to the requirements in the National Building Code.

=== Alberta ===
By agreement with the National Research Council of Canada, Alberta is committed to using the National Building Code of Canada as its base document with changes and modifications to suit Alberta needs in regulating the design, construction, alteration, change of use and demolition of buildings.

The Alberta Building Code 2006 was established by the Building Technical Council, a technical council of the Safety Codes Council, after consultation with municipal authorities, provincial government departments, associations, other affected parties and Code users. The Code is published for Alberta by the National Research Council of Canada.

The Alberta Building Code 2006 was adopted by provincial regulation on 2 September 2007.

The National Building Code – 2019 Alberta Edition came into force on December 1, 2019. This code is based on the National Building Code of Canada 2015. It establishes design and construction standards, including barrier-free access in new buildings and energy efficiency for housing and small buildings. It also applies to the alteration, change of use and demolition of existing buildings.

Safety Codes in Alberta are developed and administered by Alberta Municipal Affairs. In addition to the production of the National Building Code - Alberta Edition, Municipal Affairs is responsible for the development and dissemination of code interpretations and alternatives known as STANDATA which come in three forms:

1. Building Code Variances - acceptable alternative solutions to the prescriptive requirements (known as Alternative Solutions) in Division B.
2. Building Code Interpretations - interpretations on Code items
3. Building Code Bulletins - additional explanatory information on Code items or general Code topics

=== British Columbia ===
The British Columbia Building Code is based on the core concepts of the National Building Code with some variations specific to the province. The Code applies throughout British Columbia, except for some Federal lands and the City of Vancouver. The Code is published by Crown Publications.

==== Vancouver ====
Under the Vancouver Building Bylaw, Vancouver has developed its own building code based on the National Building Code.

=== Ontario ===
The Ontario Building Code (OBC) is administered by the Building and Development Branch of the Ministry of Municipal Affairs and Housing.

Prior to the enactment of the first Ontario Building Code Act in 1974, individual municipalities were responsible for developing their own building codes, resulting in a fragmented and potentially confusing regulatory environment. The introduction of a provincial Building Code Act and a provincial Building Code addressed this problem by providing for uniform construction standards across Ontario.

As of Jan. 1, 2012 the benchmark requirements for energy efficiency regarding houses and large buildings was enhanced. Updated compliance paths for energy efficiency requirements in large buildings are set out in Supplementary Standard SB-10. Residential buildings intended for occupancy on a continuing basis during the winter months must meet the performance levels specified in Supplementary Standard SB-12.

As of July 1, 2012 the Ontario Building Code was amended to address the issue of balcony glass breaking on newly constructed buildings. The new amendment, Supplementary Standard SB-13, "Glass in Guards" is intended to help minimize the likelihood that balcony glass will break on newly constructed buildings and help reduce the chance of broken pieces falling to the ground below if balcony glass does break.

=== Quebec ===
The Building Act provides for the adoption of a Construction Code and a Safety Code for buildings, equipment intended for use by the public, and electric, plumbing, and pressure installations as well as installations intended to use, store, or distribute gas. Whereas the Construction Code applies to plan and estimate designers (architects, engineers, technologists) and contractors, the Safety Code is intended for owners of buildings, equipment, and facilities.

These two codes are adopted chapter by chapter and are progressively replacing the seven laws and thirty-odd regulations that were previously in effect. The goal of this process is, obviously, to simplify regulations, but also to better define the responsibilities of owners and construction professionals.

In force since November 7, 2000, the Code de construction du Québec consists of the National Construction Code – 2005, amended, and includes Part 10 for existing buildings.

The Quebec Code de Construction is not compulsory in the province. Municipalities have the option of adopting the code of their choice, with or without modifications. In fact, many municipalities do not have any building code officially in effect.

For example, since 2013 the Régie du bâtiment du Québec has adopted a new code (Bill 122) that requires all owners of buildings that are 5 storeys and higher which are older than 1958 to conduct a facade inspection of the building by an engineer. This code is exclusive to the province.

=== Other provinces ===
Prince Edward Island, Nova Scotia, and Newfoundland and Labrador have legislation enforcing the current version of the National Building Code of Canada. Manitoba, New Brunswick, and Saskatchewan have adopted the 2010 National Building Code as regulations under provincial acts.

=== Federal jurisdiction ===
For most construction under federal jurisdiction the National Building Code of Canada is the applicable Code. Property under federal jurisdiction includes military bases, federal government land and airports. First Nations land (as defined by the Indian Act - land set aside for the exclusive use of First Nations) may choose to adopt the National Building & Fire Codes through a Band Resolution or By Law, however the National Building and Fire codes are not legally enforceable.

== Content ==
The intent of the Building Code is to detail the minimum provisions acceptable to maintain the safety of buildings, with specific regard to public health, fire protection, accessibility and structural sufficiency. It is not a textbook for building design. The Building Code concerns construction, renovation, and demolition. It also covers change of use projects where the change would result in increased hazard and/or maintenance and operation in the existing building. The Code sets out technical requirements for the aforementioned project types and does not pertain to existing buildings.

The 1995 National Building Code is split into 9 parts.

- Part 1 Scope and Definitions
- Part 2 General Requirements
- Part 3 Fire Protection, Occupant Safety and Accessibility
- Part 4 Structural Design
- Part 5 Environmental Separation
- Part 6 Heating, Ventilating and Air-conditioning
- Part 7 Plumbing Services
- Part 8 Safety Measures at Construction and Demolition Sites
- Part 9 Housing and Small Buildings

Part 1 gives the definitions and describes how the building code is applied. Houses and certain other small buildings (less than 3 storeys high and 600 m^{2}) are considered "Part 9 Buildings" and Part 9 drives the majority of the code requirements, with references to other parts where the scope of Part 9 is exceeded. Larger buildings are considered "Part 4 buildings" and parts 1 through 8 apply. Part 4 is the largest and most complicated part of the building code. It is intended to be used by engineers and architects. Part 9 is very prescriptive and is intended to be able to be applied by contractors.

The building code also references hundreds of other construction documents that are legally incorporated by reference and thus part of the enforceable code. This includes many design, material testing, installation and commissioning documents that are produced by a number of private organizations. Most prominent among these are the Canadian Electrical Code, Underwriters Laboratories of Canada a subsidiary of Underwriters Laboratories, documents on fire alarm design, and a number of National Fire Protection Association documents.
