= California Energy Code =

Section of the California Building Standards Code

The California Energy Code (also titled Building Energy Efficiency Standards for Residential and Nonresidential Buildings), called simply Title 24 in industry, is the sixth section of the California Building Standards Code. The code was created by the California Building Standards Commission in 1978 in response to a legislative mandate to reduce California's energy consumption. These standards are updated periodically by the California Energy Commission. The code includes energy conservation standards applicable to most buildings throughout California.

The code's purpose is to advance the state's energy policy, develop renewable energy sources and prepare for energy emergencies. A 2020 study found that the 1978 energy code successfully reduced energy consumption, and that the implementation of the policy passed a cost-benefit test.

== History ==
California was the first state to implement minimum energy efficiency standards in 1974. It was the first to establish an energy regulation commission – the California Energy Commission. These regulations and codes have been in effect since 1974. California has the lowest per capita energy consumption in the US.

== Structure ==
The three general parts, which include all the responsibilities and criteria of the standards, are:

- Mandatory requirements
- Performance standards
- Prescriptive standards

All buildings must follow the mandatory requirements. Performance standards vary by the building location and type.

These parts are designed to accomplish the following:

- Forecast future energy need
- Support energy and technology research
- Develop renewable energy resources
- Develop renewable transportation fuels and technologies

== Climate zones ==
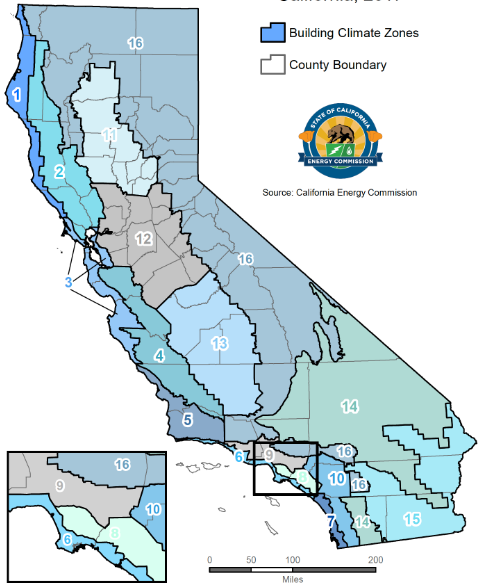
Climate zones in California

Standards vary based on climate zone. California is divided into 16 zones:

1. Arcata
2. Santa Rosa
3. Oakland
4. San Jose
5. Santa Maria
6. Torrance
7. San Diego
8. Fullerton
9. Burbank
10. Riverside
11. Red Bluff
12. Sacramento
13. Fresno
14. Palmdale
15. Palm Springs
16. Blue Canyon

== 2019 Code ==
The 2019 California Energy Code became effective on January 1, 2020. It focuses on such areas such as residential photovoltaic systems, thermal envelope standards and non-residential lighting requirements.

Homes built under this code are about 53% more energy efficient than those built to comply with the 2016 Energy Code. This code provides a market for "smart" technologies.

The 2019 Code added photovoltaic system requirements for low-rise residential buildings. Exceptions grant a reduction in size for photovoltaic systems.

== See also ==
- Energy law – Law governing the use and taxation of energy
- Global Warming Solutions Act of 2006 – California state law
- Green Building Initiative
- Greenhouse gas emissions – Greenhouse gases emitted from human activities
- Indoor air quality – Air quality within and around buildings and structures
