= Green building in the United States =

This article provides examples of green building programs in the United States. These programs span the public, private, and non-profit sectors, and all have the goal of increasing energy efficiency and the sustainability of the built environment.

== Sustainable Design Organizations and Green Building Programs ==
In the United States, governments and private organizations have established several sustainable design organizations and programs in green building.

The U.S. Green Building Council (USGBC) is a non-profit trade organization that promotes sustainability in how buildings are designed, built and operated. The USGBC is best known for the development of the Leadership in Energy and Environmental Design (LEED) rating system and Greenbuild, a green building conference that promotes the green building industry. As of September 2008, USGBC has more than 17,000 member organizations from every sector of the building industry and works to promote buildings that are environmentally responsible, profitable and healthy places to live and work. To achieve this, it has developed a variety of programs and services, and works closely with key industry and research organizations and federal, state and local government agencies. USGBC also offers a host of educational opportunities, including workshops and Web-based seminars to educate the public and industry professionals on different elements of the green building industry, from the basics to more technical information. Through its Green Building Certification Institute, USGBC offers industry professionals the chance to develop expertise in the field of green building and to receive accreditation as green building professionals.

The General Services Administration, an independent establishment and government corporation under the Federal Government, builds, manages, and preserves government buildings and leases and manages commercial real estate. GSA works to ensure that the important and complex mandates and standards for federal buildings are understood and followed. Many of these requirements require improving building efficiency and sustainability by applying green technology and practices to operations and management services.

The National Association of Home Builders, a trade association representing home builders, remodelers and suppliers to the industry, has created a voluntary residential green building program known as NAHBGreen. The program includes an online scoring tool, national certification, industry education, and training for local verifiers. The online scoring tool is free to builders and to homeowners.

The Green Building Initiative is a non-profit network of building industry leaders working to mainstream building approaches that are environmentally progressive, but also practical and affordable for builders to implement. The GBI has developed a web-based rating tool called Green Globes, which has been upgraded in accordance with ANSI procedures.

The United States Environmental Protection Agency's Energy Star program rates commercial buildings for energy efficiency and provides Energy Star qualifications for new homes that meet its standards for energy efficient building design.

The Collaborative for High Performance Schools is a non-profit green rating program specifically for K-12 schools. CHPS addresses energy efficiency and additional design considerations fostering healthy and environmentally responsible school buildings. On June 4, 2008, the U.S. House of Representatives passed the "21st Century Green High-Performing Public School Facilities Act," which would commit over $20 billion of funding over the next five years to high performance schools. CHPS is recognized as one of the standards that projects would need to meet in order to qualify for the H.R. 3021 legislation funding. H.R. 3021 was referred to the Senate on August 1, 2008.

The Green Communities Initiative provided the first National Green Building Program for new constructions and rehabilitation of affordable housing. It was launched in 2004 as a partnership between initiative taker Enterprise Community Partners (ECP), the Natural Resources Defense Council, Global Green USA, the American Institute of Architects, the American Planning Association, Southface and the National Center for Healthy Housing, along with a number of corporate, financial and philanthropic institutions. Enterprise Community Partners first committed to $555 million in grants, financing and equity to bring green affordable housing to the mainstream. ECP launched the "next generation" Green Communities in 2009 thereby committing to an additional $4 billion. The Green Communities Initiative created the Green Communities Criteria which address eight areas for green building projects and are compatible with LEED standards.

== Campus greening ==
Transformative work on American college campuses in the 2000s has done much to change the implicit evaluation of "progress" that green building attracts amongst academics. According to Ann Rappaport, a lecturer at Tufts School of Engineering who writes about climate change and universities, "[t]he value of campus greening [in the United States] goes well beyond resources saved; greening generates interest and invites members of the academic community to think differently about societal values, goods consumed, and the infrastructure for shelter and mobility, raising questions about how human needs can be met in new ways."

== Federal High-Performance Green Buildings ==
American Recovery and Reinvestment Act of 2009 has made available not less than $4.5 billion for measures necessary to convert General Services Administration facilities to High-Performance Green Buildings, as defined in the Energy Independence and Security Act of 2007 (Public Law 110-140).

== Green affordable housing ==
Green affordable housing is affordable housing that exhibits "green" or "sustainable" features. Several state and local governments have adopted programs that encourage or require building green when constructing affordable housing.

Mixed-income housing developer McCormack Baron Salazar was the first developer in the world to have received two U.S. Green Building Council LEED for Neighborhood Development (LEED-ND) Certifications for completed neighborhoods University Place, in Memphis, Tennessee and Renaissance Place in St. Louis, MO. Both are urban, mixed-income, affordable developments built under the Department of Housing and Urban Development’s HOPE VI program.

== State and local initiatives ==
=== California ===
The 2010 California Green Building Standards Code(Calgreen) is the first statewide green building code in the country and seeks to establish minimum green building standards for the majority of residential and commercial new construction projects across California.

San Francisco Mayor Gavin Newsom approved a green building ordinance in early August 2008 that imposes strict requirements on newly constructed residential and commercial buildings within the city, as well as building renovations.

For homes, the ordinance requires ratings from the GreenPoints rating system, developed by a non-profit organization called Build It Green. Starting next year, new "small" residential buildings (those with four dwellings or fewer) must achieve 25 GreenPoints (equal to the "Elements" rating), but do not need to be rated. For 2010 and 2011, the homes must be GreenPoint Rated and building applications must demonstrate that a minimum of 50 GreenPoints (equal to the "Whole House" rating) will be achieved. And starting in 2012, building applications for new homes must demonstrate that at least 75 GreenPoints will be achieved. The same rules apply for mid-size residential buildings, except that the requirement for 75 GreenPoints starts earlier, in 2011.

For commercial buildings and high-rise residential buildings, the ordinance adds in requirements from the U.S. Green Building Council's LEED (Leadership in Energy and Environmental Design) rating system. Starting in November (if the California Energy Commission has approved the legislation), new permit applications for high-rise residential buildings must include documentation to achieve LEED certification (or 50 GreenPoints), and starting in 2010, they must include documentation to achieve LEED Silver certification (or 75 GreenPoints). A number of specific LEED standards must also be met for landscaping, water use reduction, and construction debris management. Mid-size commercial buildings don't need to meet LEED certification requirements but must meet LEED standards for building commissioning, landscaping, water use, and construction debris management starting in 2009, and must meet enhanced commissioning standards and tighter water use requirements starting in 2010. Beginning in 2012, the buildings must also meet LEED standards for the use of on-site renewable energy or the purchase of renewable energy credits.

The toughest requirements apply to large commercial buildings. Starting in November, new permit applications for high-rise residential building must submit documentation to achieve LEED certification, and that requirement ratchets up to LEED Silver in 2009 and LEED Gold in 2012. There are also requirements to meet additional LEED standards, nearly equal to those for mid-size commercial buildings. Finally, for new large commercial interiors and major alterations to existing buildings, new permit applications must include documentation to achieve the same LEED rating requirements as for new large commercial buildings, and must also meet the LEED standards for materials that emit low levels of indoor pollutants. All new buildings must earn additional rating points if an older building was demolished to make room for it, and they must earn even higher points if the demolished building was historical. Building projects can also earn extra points by retaining historical features of the previous building.

Earning LEED credits within this framework is becoming cost neutral for most hotel developers, especially in the Napa Valley where the industry has caught up to speed. Since at least March 2008, green property builders have been giving them "real figures on what it costs to build a green property" after developer tax incentives.

=== Virginia ===
Charlottesville, Virginia became one of the first small towns in the United States to enact green building legislation. This presents a significant shift in construction and architecture as LEED regulations have formerly been focused on commercial construction. If US homeowner interest grows in "green" residential construction, the companies involved in the production and manufacturing of LEED building materials will become likely candidates for tomorrow's round of private equity and IPO investing.

=== Washington ===
In 2005, Washington state became the first state in the United States to enact green building legislation. According to the law, all major public agency facilities with a floor area exceeding 5,000 square feet (465 m²), including state funded school buildings, are required to meet or exceed LEED standards in construction or renovation. The projected benefits from this law are 20% annual savings in energy and water costs, 38% reduction in waste water production and 22% reduction in construction waste.

== See also ==
- Department of Housing and Urban Development (HUD)
- High-Performance Green Buildings
- United States Green Building Council
- 2010 California Green Building Standards Code (Calgreen)
