= California Building Standards Code =

The California Building Standards Code is the building code for California, and Title 24 of the California Code of Regulations (CCR). It is maintained by the California Building Standards Commission which is granted the authority to oversee processes related to the California building codes by California Building Standards Law. Code amendments are proposed by the California Department of Housing and Community Development. The California building codes under Title 24 are established based on several criteria: standards adopted by states based on national model codes, national model codes adapted to meet California conditions, and standards passed by the California legislature that address concerns specific to California.

Title 24 of the California Code of Regulations consist of 13 parts:

- Part 1-California Administrative Code
- Part 2-California Building Code
- Part 2.5-California Residential Code
- Part 3-California Electrical Code
- Part 4-California Mechanical Code
- Part 5-California Plumbing Code
- Part 6-California Energy Code (this section is commonly known as “Title 24” in the construction trade)
- Part 7- Reserved
- Part 8-California Historical Building Code
- Part 9-California Fire Code
- Part 10-California Existing Building Code
- Part 11-California Green Building Standards Code (also referred to as CALGreen)
- Part 12-California Referenced Standards Code

Portions of editions of the California building codes are published by the International Code Council (ICC), National Fire Protection Association (NFPA), International Association of Plumbing and Mechanical Officials (IAPMO), and BNi Building News. As they are, in effect, amended versions of copyright works such as the International Building Code (IBC) maintained by the International Code Council (ICC), the regulations have substantial portions under copyright, and hence may be withheld from the public or individuals, but still have the force of law. In 2008, Carl Malamud published the California Building Standards Code on Public.Resource.Org for free.

== Code adoption cycle ==
New editions of the California Building Standards Code are published every three years in a triennial cycle with supplemental information published during other years. Publication of triennial editions of the CCR began in 1989. The most recent version of the code was the 2019 edition published January 1, 2020. Changes made to each edition are based on proposals made by state agencies. Proposals are presented to the California Building Standards Commission and must provide thorough justification for proposed changes. Proposals go through multiple phases during the adoption cycle.
