= California Green Building Standards Code =

Part 11 of the California Building Standards Code

The California Green Building Standards Code (CALGreen Code) is Part 11 of the California Building Standards Code and is the first statewide "green" building code in the US.

== Background and purpose ==
The purpose of CALGreen is to improve public health, safety and general welfare by enhancing the design and construction of buildings through the use of building concepts having a reduced negative impact or positive environmental impact and encouraging sustainable construction practices in the following categories:

1. Planning and design
2. Energy efficiency
3. Water efficiency and conservation
4. Material conservation and resource efficiency
5. Environmental quality

To achieve CALGreen Tier 1, buildings must comply with the latest edition of "Savings By Design, Healthcare Modeling Procedures". To achieve CALGreen Tier 2, buildings must exceed the latest edition of "Savings By Design, Healthcare Modeling Procedures" by a minimum of 15%.

The provisions of this code are directed to:

1. State-owned buildings, including buildings constructed by the Trustees of the California State University, and to the extent permitted by California law, buildings designed and constructed by the Regents of the University of California and regulated by the California Building Standards Commission.
2. Energy efficiency standards regulated by the California Energy Commission.
3. Low-rise residential buildings constructed throughout California, including hotels, motels, lodging houses, apartment houses, dwellings, dormitories, condominiums, shelters for homeless persons, congregate residences, employee housing, factory-built housing and other types of dwellings containing sleeping accommodations.
4. Public elementary and secondary schools, and community college buildings regulated by the Division of the State Architect within the California Department of General Services.
5. Qualified historical buildings and structures and their associated sites regulated by the State Historical Building Safety Board within the Division of the State Architect within the California Department of General Services.
6. General acute care hospitals, acute psychiatric hospitals, skilled nursing and/or intermediate care facilities, clinics licensed by the Department of Public Health and correctional treatment centers regulated by the California Office of Statewide Health Planning and Development within the California Health and Human Services Agency.
7. Graywater systems regulated by the California Department of Water Resources and the California Department of Housing and Community Development.

=== Land use ===
In US urban land area quadrupled from 1945 to 2002, increasing at about twice the rate of population growth over this period. Estimated area of rural land used for residential purposes increased by 21,000,000 acres (85,000 km^{2}) (29%) from 1997 to 2002 (2002).

=== Water use ===
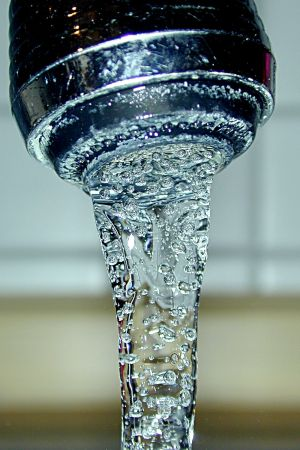

Water is a precious natural resource. At least two-thirds of the United States have experienced or are bracing for local, regional, or statewide water shortages. US population, and in particular California population has constantly increased during the last decades, so using water wisely is crucial in order to provide enough water also for the future generations.

During the 20th century, water diverted south through the California Aqueduct was economically essential to Los Angeles. But fisheries, wildlife and water quality in the bay and delta paid a heavy price. Water is becoming an increasingly important resource throughout California and the United States.

The largest single use of potable water in California is water used to irrigate for agriculture. The largest remaining segment of water use is that of public water supplies.

=== Air and atmosphere ===
Buildings in the United States contribute 38.9% of the nation's total carbon dioxide emissions, including 20.8% from the residential sector and 18.0% from the commercial sector (2008). On average, the energy use for typical buildings is assumed to consist of 67% electricity and 33% natural gas.

The annual mean air temperature of a city with 1 million people or more can be 1.8–5.4 °F (1.0–3.0 °C) warmer than its surroundings. In the evening, the difference can be as high as 22 °F (12 °C). Heat islands can increase summertime peak energy demand, air conditioning costs, air pollution and greenhouse gas emissions, heat-related illness and mortality. One study estimates that the heat island effect is responsible for 5–10% of peak electricity demand for cooling buildings in cities. HVAC systems was required to use MERV 13 filtration, up from MERV 8, (2019 CalGreen, effective January 1, 2020)

=== Materials and waste ===
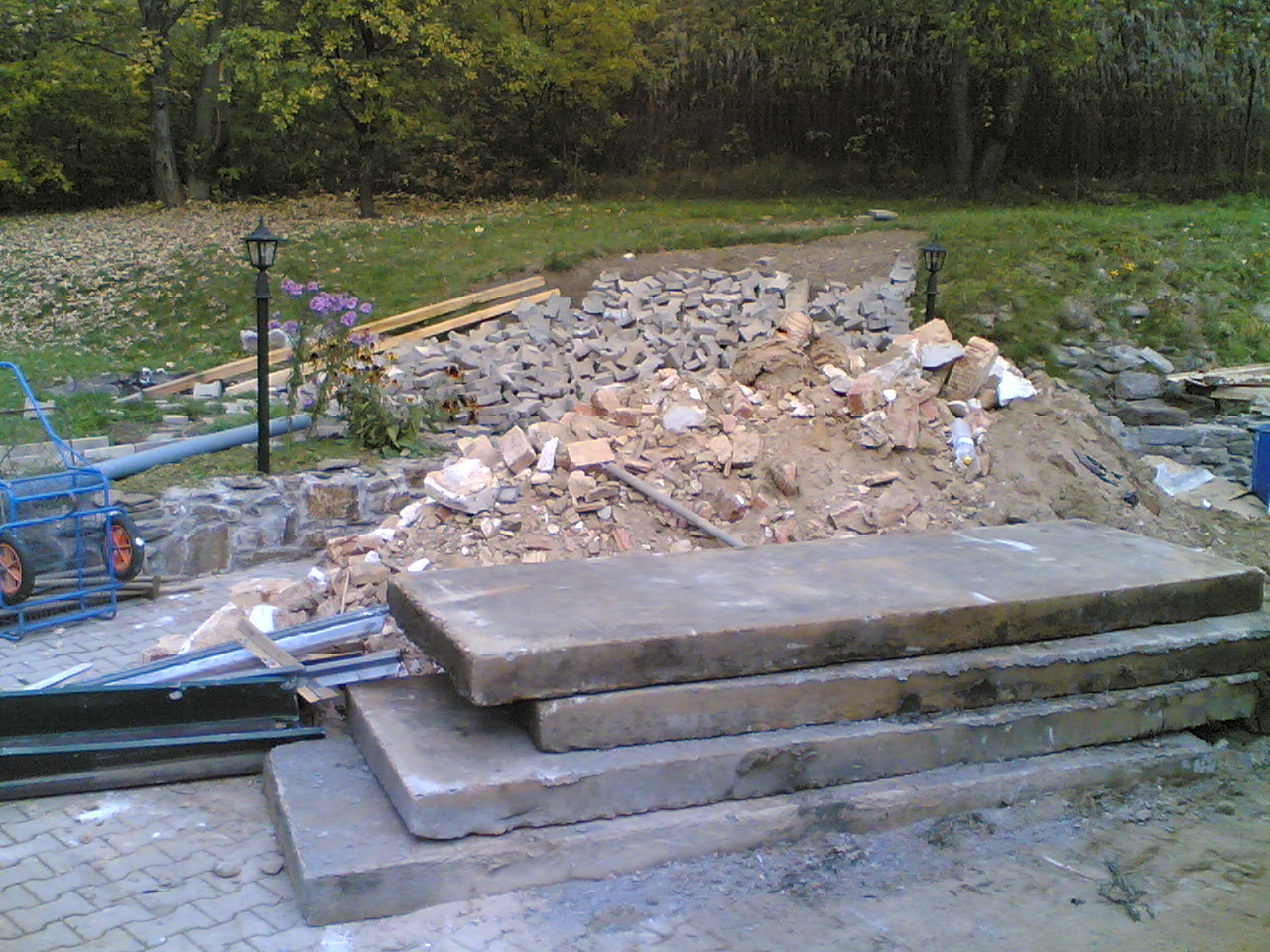
Demolition waste

Approximately 170 million tons of building-related C&D materials were generated in the U.S. during 2003. This is a 25% increase in generation from the 1996 estimate of 136 million tons (which was 25% to 40% of the national solid waste stream).

== Provisions ==
The residential mandatory measures are provided in chapter 4 and the non-residential ones in chapter 5 of CALGreen Code.

About the residential mandatory measures, the Code provides measures like storm water drainage and retention systems thought to prevent flooding of adjacent properties and prevent pollution from storm water runoff by retaining soil on-site or by providing filtering to restrict sedimentation from reaching storm water drainage systems and receiving streams or rivers. To comply, retention basin has to be sized and shown on the site plan, and water has to be filtered and routed to a public drainage system. The new residential structure has to also comply with local storm water ordinances.

The drainage system has to be shown on the site plan (swales, drain piping, retention areas, ground water recharge).

CALGreen does not regulate energy efficiency (both for residential and non-residential structures), instead remanding it to the California Energy Commission (CEC) and its California Energy Code.

Concerning the water issue, the code requires a 20% reduction of indoor water use and it uses both a prescriptive and performance method.

The prescriptive method provides some technical features that have to be followed:

- Showerheads ≤ 2.0 gpm (gallons per minute) @ 80 psi
- Lavatory faucets ≤ 1.5 gpm @ 60 psi
- Kitchen faucets ≤ 1.8 gpm @ 60 psi
- Urinals ≤ 0.5 gal/flush
- Waterclosets ≤ 1.28 gallon effective flush rate

The performance method uses the performance calculation worksheets in Chapter 8 (or other calculation acceptable to the enforcing agency).

CALGreen also specifies acceptable performance standards for plumbing fixtures with reduced water usage. Fixtures can be installed if they meet standards listed in Table 4.303.3.

Also outdoor water usage is regulated: the Code requires irrigation controls to be weather- or soil moisture-based and automatically adjust irrigation in response to changes in plants' needs as weather conditions change, or have rain sensors or communication systems that account for local rainfall.

About construction waste reduction, disposal, and recycling, the code says that at least 50% of nonhazardous construction and demolition debris have to be recycled and/or salvaged. This has to be done through the development of a waste management plan submitted for approval to the enforcing agency.

CALGreen Appendix A4 contains the voluntary measures (Tier 1 and Tier 2) that were developed in response to numerous stakeholder requests for a statewide method of enhancing green construction practiced beyond the Code's minimum levels. To meet Tier 1 or Tier 2, designers, builders, or property owners must increase the number of green building measures and further reduce percentages of water and energy use and waste to landfills in order to meet the threshold levels for each tier (these measures are listed in Section A4.601.4.2 (Tier 1) and Section A4.601.5.2 (Tier 2)).

Also for non-residential structures CALGreen demands 20% savings of potable water, standards for plumbing fixtures and fittings, a construction waste management plan, and a construction reduction waste of at least 50%.

The Code also requires a finish material pollutant control and an acoustical control for exterior noise transmission and interior sound.

The CALGreen 2010 Code was adopted by the California Building Standards Commission (CBSC), the California Department of Housing and Community Development (HCD), the Division of the State Architect (DSA) within the California Department of General Services, and the Office of Statewide Health Planning and Development (OSHPD) within the California Health and Human Services Agency.

CBSC has the responsibility to administer the program and review building standards proposed by state agencies, develop building standards for occupancies where no other state agency has the authority (non-residential) and adopt and approve building standards for publication.

The targets of the Code are designers, architects, builders, property owners, and also businesses and the government that have to take into consideration the new standards when they decide to build new structures.

== History ==
Several legislative bills like AB 35, AB 888, and AB 1058 were introduced during the 2007–2008 legislative session to require green building standards for state-owned or leased buildings, commercial buildings, and residential buildings respectively.

Development of CALGreen began in 2007 and, during the rulemaking process, CBSC collaborated with the Department of Housing and Community Development (HCD), stakeholder groups and others. The first result of this cooperation was the adoption of the 2008 California Green Building Standards Code (CGBC) that became effective since August 1, 2009.

The initial 2008 California Green Building Code publication provided a framework and first step toward establishing green building standards for low-rise residential structures. 2008 GBSC was used as a base document, analyzed and evaluated for necessary updates that lead to the 2010 CALGreen Code, but this is not the last step of the process: as new materials, technology, and designs are developed and become available, also CALGreen has to develop.

There are some enhancements from the 2008 Code to the 2010 one, among them: The previous code said that energy efficiency was regulated by the California Energy Code. Section 4.201.1 of CALGreen 2010 clarifies instead that the CEC adopts regulations to establish the minimum level of energy efficiency a structure that is heated or cooled must meet or exceed. About indoor water use, HCD adopted maximum flush rates for toilets and the CEC adopted appliance standards which limit water use of appliances and fixtures. Section 4.303.1 of 2010 CALGreen reduces indoor water use by at least 20% and it also provides a prescriptive and a performance method to meet the requirements. CALGreen 2010 also covers items that weren't covered before like multiple showerheads and irrigation controllers.

== Policy tools ==
CALGreen 2010 uses prescriptive regulation (it provides technical characteristics that have to be met in the construction of new buildings).

Economists and industry, often criticize this kind of regulation because it provides little reason for innovation once the regulated party has achieved the required standard. However CALGreen provides just the minimum standard to achieve and it delegates to Local authorities to increase the level of the standards to apply (depending on the particular characteristics of the local area).

This tool is the most effective to solve in the long run the environmental problems faced by this policy because fixing technical characteristics that have to be followed in the construction process it assures that all the new buildings will have certain desirable characteristics of efficiency.

CALGreen 2010 alleviates the environmental problems connected with residential and non-residential structures, but it doesn't solve them both because it is limited to the new buildings.

== Stakeholders ==
There are a lot of players interested in CALGreen and in its evolution. Policy targets are important stakeholders: designers, architects, builders, property owners and in general also businesses, the government and its agencies.

Some of the stakeholders try to influence the evolution of the policy participating to CBSC's and HCD's Green Building Focus Groups (stakeholder focus groups). They are: building officials; representatives from the construction industry; representatives from the environmental community; state agency representatives and public members.

There are also government agencies involved. A part from CBSC, HCD, DSA, and OSHPD, the following agencies contribute to the formulation of the policy: Air Resource Board (for standards concerning air pollutants), California Integrated Waste Management Board (CalRecycle) (for what concerns landfill disposals), the Department of General Services, the Department of Public Health, the Department of Water Resources and the Energy Resources Conservation and Development Commission (Energy Commission).

Building officials are interested in the policy because they want to know what are the new standards and what processes lead to them in order to understand how to do their job in the best way possible.

Construction Industry is very interested in influencing the policy because changes in the standards could mean changes in suppliers and maybe also increasing costs and they are mainly interested in minimizing costs.

Producers of plumbing fixtures or companies that produce insulation systems for the house are interested in CALGreen because it modifies their sectors (like it modify also the construction industry); the change can be encouraged by those companies that produce energy or water saving products or it can be obstructed by those that are not ready yet.

The environmentalists are interested in maximize the level of the mandatory provisions contained in the policy in order to maximize the benefits for the environment.

State agencies like the Office of Statewide Health Planning and Development are instead interested in protecting particular benefits for the community (in the case of OSHPD the health).

== Policy evaluation ==
HCD organizes annual and triennial focus group meetings among stakeholders to check the effectiveness of the policy adopted and to discuss proposed changes to the code.

CALGreen 2010 is effective since January 1, 2011, so it's still too early for evaluate its effectiveness.

However both GBIG and LEED are successful standards similar to CALGreen.

The system developed by Build-it-Green is called GreenPoint Rated Climate Calculator and initial project run-throughs using the Climate Calculator found emissions reductions of about 20% over conventional new construction built to code.

In March 2008 a study of New Buildings Institute found that on average, LEED-NC buildings deliver anticipated savings and that LEED energy use is similar to predictions: 25–30% better than the national average (average savings increase for the higher LEED levels).

== See also ==
- California Energy Code
- Green building
- Green building in the United States
- Autonomous building
- Zero-energy building
- EPA
