= Gord Miller (environmental commissioner) =

Candain environmentalist and politician

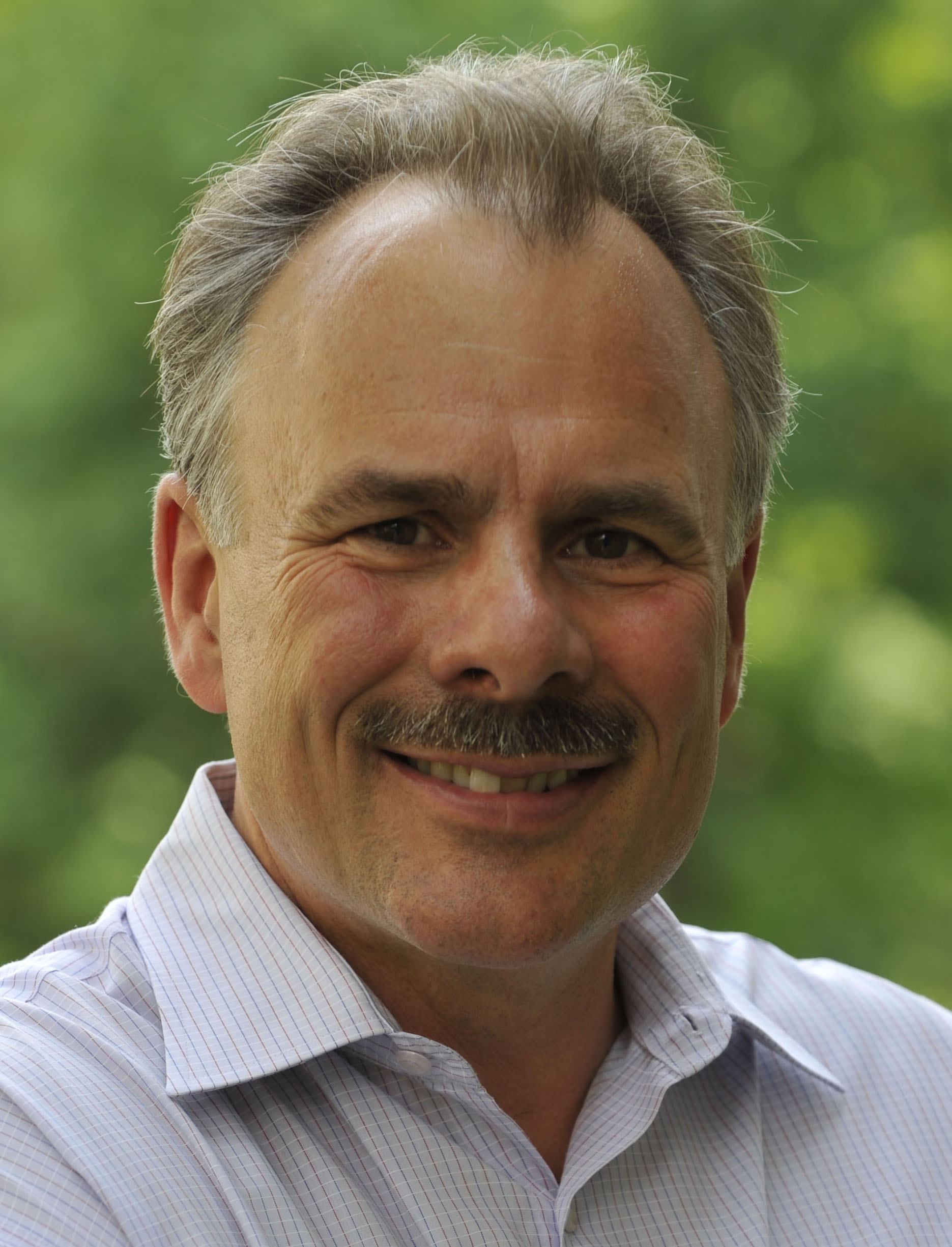

Environmental Commissioner of Ontario
- In office February 1, 2000 – May 18, 2015
- Preceded by: Ivy Wile (interim)
- Succeeded by: Ellen Schwartzel (interim)

Personal details
- Born: March 27, 1953 (age 73)
- Party: Green (federal); Ontario Green (provincial)
- Other political affiliations: Ontario PC (???-2015); Conservative (2003-2015)
- Education: University of Guelph

Gord Miller (born March 27, 1953) was the Environmental Commissioner of Ontario, having served from February 1, 2000 to May 18, 2015. He was appointed to a five-year term in 2000 and was reappointed to this position in 2005 and 2010 for two consecutive five-year terms. He also ran unsuccessfully for federal and provincial office in various Ontario electoral districts.

== Early life ==
Before his appointment, he worked for the Ontario Ministry of the Environment for 14 years as a scientist, manager of training and development, and as a district manager. He also helped to set up the advocacy organization Ontario Public Interest Group Guelph. Miller received an Honours Bachelor of Science degree in Biology in 1976 and a Master of Science degree in Plant ecology in 1978, both from the University of Guelph.

== Tenure as environment commissioner ==
As environment commissioner, Miller issued strongly-worded reports annually, calling the province to account on its environmental commitments. Starting in 2008, he added special reports on greenhouse gas emissions and energy conservation.

Miller did not shy away from direct criticism of government decisions and longstanding abuses in law. An early example was his direct condemnation of SLAPP lawsuits for their negative effect on public advocacy. Miller's reports very strongly supported "environmental activists" who argued, "the practice is widespread in the development industry and used to pacify activists and environmentalists", that is, silence them with fear of civil liability. Ontario passed an anti-SLAPP law in 2010.

In 2013 Miller called to public attention the fact that Ontario’s cabinet had allocated to itself, in the 2012 budget, the power to turn over public land to the exclusive control of private, multinational corporations. In a formal report Miller said that this, combined with cuts to staff and programs at Ministries of Natural Resources and the Environment, all "quietly and without public consultation", led to a situation with "no rules". Other actions were, Miller said, "gutting" protections for species at risk and that it was time for hydraulic fracturing regulation.

In 2014 Miller warned that Ontario had done "very little" other than closing coal plants to meet its 2020 emissions targets, and had failed to build transit and other efficient infrastructure.

=== Appointment controversy ===
Miller's sharp turn on the Harris government ended a longstanding controversy. Due to his two prior candidacies, Miller's initial appointment raised the perception by the NDP and Liberal caucuses that he was a Conservative partisan. Opposition parties at Queen's Park accused the Harris government of using its majority to name a Conservative as Ontario's environment commissioner. Miller was subsequently re-appointed twice by two successive parliaments headed by Liberal governments, whom he sharply criticized.

== Politics ==
Miller was, in addition to a former federal and provincial PC candidate, the president of the federal Conservative riding association in Nipissing, home riding of then-Premier Mike Harris.

On May 19, 2015, Miller sought the Green Party of Canada nomination for the seat of Guelph in the upcoming Canadian federal election, and on June 8, 2015, he was selected to run. He had gone to university there in 1977-79 and helped found the Ontario Public Interest Research Group in Guelph.

Miller had also previously run for provincial Progressive Conservatives in 1995 and in 1997 for Jean Charest's federal Progressive Conservatives. He said the 2015 Conservative Party of Canada "is not like and doesn't represent the points of view" of those parties: "We thought we were uniting the right, instead we united the wrong".

Miller was considered a star candidate by local media. From his first public appearance he sharply criticized all the other parties for "committing to pursuing an economy based on bitumen from Alberta that we'll never be able to extract", echoing former Bank of Canada head Mark Carney's formal raising of this issue at the Financial Stability Board and Bank of England in 2014. Miller also accused the government of "silencing" scientists and called Bill C-51 "a terrible piece of legislation."

== Electoral record ==
=== Federal ===
2019 Canadian federal election: Parry Sound—Muskoka
Party	Candidate	Votes	%	±%	Expenditures
Conservative	Scott Aitchison	22,845	41.8	-1.50	$77,914.80
Liberal	Trisha Cowie	16,615	30.4	-8.48	$71,267.46
Green	Gord Miller	8,409	15.4	+8.18	$55,284.74
New Democratic	Tom Young	6,417	11.7	+1.59	none listed
Independent	Daniel Predie Jr	377	0.7	–	none listed
Total valid votes/expense limit		54,663	100.0		
Total rejected ballots		392			
Turnout		55,055	66.4		
Eligible voters		82,930			
Conservative hold		Swing		+3.49	
Source: Elections Canada

2015 Canadian federal election: Guelph
Party	Candidate	Votes	%	±%	Expenditures
Liberal	Lloyd Longfield	34,303	49.10	+5.80	$213,387.97
Conservative	Gloria Kovach	18,407	26.35	-6.52	$59,899.61
New Democratic	Andrew Seagram	8,392	12.01	-4.72	$42,701.14
Green	Gord Miller	7,909	11.32	+5.19	$222,034.20
Libertarian	Alex Fekri	520	0.74	+0.42	$40.20
Marijuana	Kornelis Klevering	193	0.28	-0.01	–
Communist	Tristan Dineen	144	0.21	+0.04	–
Total valid votes/Expense limit		69,868	100.00	–	$239,632.86
Total rejected ballots		298	0.42	–	
Turnout		70,166	73.27	–	
Eligible voters		95,761			
Liberal hold		Swing		+6.16	
Source: Elections Canada

1997 Canadian federal election: Nipissing
Party	Candidate	Votes	%	±%	Expenditures
Liberal	Bob Wood	19,786	56.3	-6.5	–
Reform	Laurie Kidd	7,390	21.0	+4.1	–
Progressive Conservative	Gord Miller	5,666	16.1	-0.2	–
New Democratic	Art Campbell	2,280	6.5	+3.2	–
Total valid votes/Expense limit		35,122	100.0	–	–
Total rejected ballots		231	0.7	–	
Turnout		35,353	63.8	–	
Eligible voters		55,422			
Liberal hold		Swing		-6.5	
Source: Elections Canada

=== Provincial ===
1995 Ontario general election: Cochrane South
Party	Candidate	Votes	%	±%
New Democratic	Gilles Bisson	12,114	50.48	+1.27
Progressive Conservative	Gord Miller	6,587	27.45	+23.07
Liberal	Jim Brown	4,958	20.66	-19.54
Independent	Joel Vien	339	1.41	–
Total valid votes		23,098	100.00	
Total rejected, unmarked and declined ballots		192	0.83	
Turnout		23,290	60.36	
Eligible voters		38,584		
New Democratic hold		Swing		+1.27
Source: Elections Ontario

== See also ==
- Environmental Bill of Rights
