= Environmental Commissioner of Ontario =

- Commissaire à l’environnement de l’Ontario
- Legislative Assembly of Ontario
- Status: Abolished
- Seat: 1075 Bay Street, Suite 605, Toronto, Ontario
- Appointer: Legislative Assembly of Ontario
- Term length: 5 years
- Constituting instrument: Environmental Bill of Rights, 1993
- Formation: 1994
- First holder: Eva Ligeti
- Final holder: Dianne Saxe
- Abolished: 2019
- Superseded by: Auditor General of Ontario
- Website: eco.on.ca at the Wayback Machine (archived April 1, 2019)

The environmental commissioner of Ontario (ECO; French: commissaire à l’environnement de l’Ontario) was a non-partisan officer of the Legislative Assembly of Ontario charged with upholding the province's Environmental Bill of Rights (EBR). The commissioner did not report to any ministry, but rather to the Legislature itself, and was selected via recommendation by an all-party committee chaired by the speaker of the Legislative Assembly. The candidate was then appointed by unanimous vote of the Legislative Assembly of Ontario. The Office of the Environmental Commissioner of Ontario consisted of the commissioner and 24 staff, who supported the commissioner in overseeing the administration of the EBR and producing reports to the Legislature.

The office was abolished by the provincial government of Premier Doug Ford in 2019, with responsibilities for the enforcement and administration of the EBR transferred to the auditor general of Ontario.

== Mandate ==
The intent of the EBR is to give Ontarians rights to participate in environmental decision-making, and to hold ministries accountable for their decisions as they affect the environment. The EBR also established the Environmental Registry, an online database where ministries post environmentally significant proposals and decisions for public notice and comment.

In 2009, the EBR was amended to give the ECO the responsibility to report annually on Ontario's progress in reducing greenhouse gas emissions, and on conserving energy.

== Commissioners ==
Name	Term
Eva Ligeti	1994-1999
Ivy Wile	1999-2000 (interim)
Gord Miller	2000-2015
Ellen Schwartzel	2015 (interim)
Dianne Saxe	2015-2019

== Reports and Publications ==
The ECO issues several reports each year.

=== Environmental Protection Reports ===
Every year, the office released an Environmental protection report that covers ministry compliance with the Environmental Bill of Rights (EBR), and environmental protection issues related to ministries prescribed under the EBR. Up until 2016, this report was simply called the Annual Report, and was accompanied by a Supplement. The Supplement contained reviews of each application submitted under the EBR, and of ministries' use of the Environmental Registry. The Annual Report contained articles that elaborated on selected pieces from the Supplement, and articles about developing or significant issues of interest to the ECO.

Small Steps Forward, Volume 1: http://docs.assets.eco.on.ca/reports/environmental-protection/2015-2016/EPR-Small-Steps-Forward_Vol1-EN.pdf

Small Steps Forward, Volume 2: http://docs.assets.eco.on.ca/reports/environmental-protection/2015-2016/EPR-Small-Steps-Forward_Vol2-EN.pdf

Good Choices, Bad Choices: Environmental Rights and Environmental Protection in Ontario - 2017 - http://docs.assets.eco.on.ca/reports/environmental-protection/2017/Good-Choices-Bad-Choices.pdf

Back to Basics: 2018 Environmental Protection Report: http://docs.assets.eco.on.ca/reports/environmental-protection/2018/Back-to-Basics.pdf

=== Greenhouse Gas Progress Reports ===
Since 2008, the ECO has issued annual reports on the Ontario government's progress in reducing greenhouse gas emissions.

Facing Climate Change: http://docs.assets.eco.on.ca/reports/climate-change/2016/2016-Annual-GHG-Report-EN.pdf

Ontario's Climate Act: From Plan to Progress http://docs.assets.eco.on.ca/reports/climate-change/2017/From-Plan-to-Progress.pdf

=== Energy Conservation Progress Reports ===
Since 2008, the ECO has issued annual reports on activities in Ontario to reduce the use, or make more efficient use, of electricity, natural gas, propane, oil and transportation fuel. These reports are issued in two volumes: the first volume covers the broader policy framework affecting energy conservation in Ontario, and the second describes conservation initiatives underway, assesses energy savings derived from these initiatives, and measures progress on meeting targets.

Conservation: Let's get Serious- Annual Energy Conservation Progress Report – 2015/2016: http://docs.assets.eco.on.ca/reports/energy/2015-2016/ECO_Conservation_Lets_Get_Serious.pdf

Every Drop Counts: Reducing the Energy and Climate Footprint of Ontario's Water use - 2016/2017: http://docs.assets.eco.on.ca/reports/energy/2016-2017/Every-Drop-Counts.pdf

Every Joule Counts: Ontario's Energy Use and Conservation Year in Review - 2016/2017: http://docs.assets.eco.on.ca/reports/energy/2016-2017/Every-Joule-Counts.pdf

Making Connections: Straight Talk about Electricity in Ontario http://docs.assets.eco.on.ca/reports/energy/2018/Making-Connections.pdf

=== Special Reports ===
In addition to the above reports, the ECO may make a special report on any matter related to the EBR that, in the opinion of the Commissioner, should not be deferred until the annual report.

Developing the 2017 Long-Term Energy Plan: http://docs.assets.eco.on.ca/reports/special-reports/2016/LTEP-2016-Special-Report.pdf

EBR Performance Check-up - Respect for Ontario Environmental Rights 2015/2016: http://docs.assets.eco.on.ca/reports/special-reports/2016/EBR-Performance-Checkup_EN.pdf

Beyond the Blue Box: Ontario's Fresh Start on Waste Diversion and the Circular Economy - 2017 - http://docs.assets.eco.on.ca/reports/special-reports/2017/Beyond-the-Blue-Box.pdf
