= Ligeti Ridge =

Undersea ridge in the Southern Ocean

Ligeti Ridge (62°S 28°W) is an undersea ridge in the Southern Ocean. The name was approved by the Advisory Committee for Undersea Features in June 1987.
