= Vancouver Building Bylaw =

Vancouver is the only municipality in Canada that enacts its own building codes. Other cities instead use the National Building Code of Canada and the provincial codes that are derived from it. Vancouver's code is also derived from these but includes some local changes. The current code was enacted on November 1, 2019 (Building By-law No. 12511).
