= Environmental Registry =

The Environmental Registry ("the Registry") is an online database where Ontario government ministries publish notices of environmentally significant proposals or decisions, and invite the public to submit their comments. The ministries are obliged under the Environmental Bill of Rights to consider these comments when making their final decisions, and every year the Environmental Commissioner of Ontario reports on how well the various ministries used the Registry, including how well they considered the comments they received.

It is operated by the Ministry of the Environment, and is found at https://ero.ontario.ca/.
