= Market transformation =

Market transformation describes both a policy objective and a program strategy to promote the value and self-sustaining presence of energy-efficient technologies in the marketplace. It is a strategic process of market intervention which aims to alter market behavior by removing identified barriers and leveraging opportunities to further the internalization of cost-effective energy efficiency as a matter of standard practice. Market transformation has rapidly become the objective of many privately and publicly supported energy efficiency programs in the United States and other countries.

== Background ==
First coined in a paper presented at the ACEEE Summer Study in 1992, the term "market transformation" is underpinned by the classic microeconomic model of markets. The concept describes a downward-sloping demand curve and an upward-sloping, presumably short-run supply curve. In the energy efficiency market, however, standard price and quantity equilibria are often rendered inefficient because of structural market barriers like split incentives, asymmetric information, distorted market power, and hassle costs. Market transformation targets these barriers to optimal efficiency with strategies to shift entire market sectors into a more efficient product mix.

While it recognizes and harnesses the power of market forces and players, market transformation has also been conceptualized as a holistic, market-based marketing strategy, building on the diffusion of innovations theory through a strategic framework for justifying market intervention.

== Implementation ==
Contrary to traditional energy efficiency strategies, which often focus on small-scale procurement and installation of efficient products, the goal of market transformation is to produce new patterns of "business as usual" for all actors in the marketplace. Programs act on market inefficiencies by removing quantity or price constraints, or by lowering transaction and uncertainty costs. Market transformation program strategies can resemble demand side management (DSM) as well as supplier innovation interventions but with the added goal of long-term energy savings and changing standard business practices.

== See also ==
- American Council for an Energy-Efficient Economy(ACEEE)
- Energy efficiency
- Energy law
- Energy policy
- Environmental technology
- Independent System Operator
- Renewable energy commercialization
