= California Building Standards Commission =

The California Building Standards Commission (CBSC) is authorized by the state of California, through the California Building Standards Law, to manage the many process relating to development, adoption, approval, publication, and implementation of California's building codes. Created in 1953 by the California Building Standards Law, the CBSC falls under the California Department of General Services within the California Government Operations Agency. The commission is formally defined under the California Building Standards Law.

The California Building Standards Code, is the foundation for the design and implementation of building codes within California. The building codes include the implementation of improved safety methods, sustainability measures, consistency, new technology and construction methods, and reliability. These codes are revamped every 18 months through the Triennial and Intervening Code Adoption Cycle. These implementations are paramount to the development of building codes.

The building codes used by California are published every three years. Additionally, Intervening Code Adoption Cycles produce supplemental pages half-way, or 18 months, into each triennial period.

== History ==
The California Building Standards Commission was Established in 1953 by the California Building Standards Law, within the Department of General Services under the Government Operations Agency. CBSC members are appointed by the Governor and confirmed by the State Senate. Starting in 1989, CBSC has published triennial editions of Title 24 every three years.

== Objectives ==
- Analyzation and accepting building standards proposed and adopted by government agency.
- Ensuring stability and uniformity in the codification, nomenclature, and format of the code.
- Listening to disputes and clarifying for issues resulting from the implementation of state building standards.
- Reviewing and approving model codes and building standards for structures owned by the state, including those of the California State University and University of California system.
- Reviewing and approving model codes of state agencies that fail to adopt these codes.
- Receiving and reviewing local agency modifications to Title 24, California Code of Regulations.
- Organizing and supervising the code adoption process for state agencies.
- Systemize and publish approved building standards in the California Building Standards Code (Title 24).
- Managing and issuing California's building code adoption processes - (CBSC Flowchart).
- Resolving issues, disputes, and redundancy in building standards.

== Copyright ==
In September 2008, Carl Malamud of Public.Resource.Org made headlines by scanning safety and building codes of California.

== See also ==
- California Building Standards Code
