= Environmental Bill of Rights =

Ontario, Canada statute

The Environmental Bill of Rights, 1993 (French: Charte des droits environnementaux de 1993, EBR) is a provincial law in Ontario, Canada passed in 1993 to provide a bill of rights to Ontario residents for environmental matters. Significantly, it gives Ontario residents the right to participate in environmental decision-making. From 1993 to 2019 the provincial government's compliance with the EBR was monitored by the Environmental Commissioner of Ontario, a non-partisan officer of the Legislative Assembly of Ontario. Since the dissolution of the ECO's office in 2019, responsibility for overseeing the EBR has been the responsibility of the Auditor General of Ontario.

== Rights and responsibilities ==
The Environmental Bill of Rights (EBR) gives citizens the right, under specific circumstances:

- to be notified and to comment on environmentally significant government proposals, using the Environmental Registry;
- to ask a ministry to review a law or to investigate harm to the environment
- to appeal a ministry decision
- to sue for harm to a public resource
- to sue for public nuisance causing environmental harm
- to be protected from employer reprisals for using the above rights.

The EBR also lays out responsibilities for those ministries that are prescribed:

- to develop and publish a Statement of Environmental Values, a statement that guides the ministry when it makes decisions that might affect the environment. The ministry must consider its SEV when it makes an environmentally significant decision. The minister must consider the SEV when deciding to conduct a Review or Investigation under the EBR.
- to post notices on the Environmental Registry for environmentally significant Acts, regulations and policies, and to consider these comments when making their decisions.

== Reporting Requirements ==
=== Energy Conservation ===
Between 2009 and 2019, the EBR required the ECO to report annually "on the progress of activities in Ontario to reduce the use or make more efficient use of electricity, natural gas, propane, oil and transportation fuels." The ECO produced two-part annual reports on energy conservation, the first part on the broader policy framework affecting energy conservation in Ontario, and the second part on the results of initiatives that are underway. The energy conservation reports issued by Commissioner Dianne Saxe 2016-2019 are posted on the SaxeFacts website.

=== Climate Change ===
Between 2009 and 2019, the EBR required the ECO to report annually on the progress of activities in Ontario to reduce emissions of greenhouse gases. The Greenhouse Gas emission (climate change) reports issued by Commissioner Dianne Saxe 2016-2019 are posted on the SaxeFacts website.
