= List of Canada-related topics by provinces and territories =

This is a list of topics related to the provinces and territories of Canada, listed by topic type.

== Geography ==
| Geography | Census divisions | Communities |
|---|---|---|
| Canadian Provinces and Territories | Canadian Provinces and Territories | Canadian Provinces and Territories |
| Rivers | Capitals | Protected Areas |
| Canadian Provinces and Territories | Canadian Provinces and Territories | Canadian Provinces and Territories |

== Infrastructure ==
| Airports | Highways |
|---|---|
| Canadian Provinces and Territories | Canadian Provinces and Territories |

== History ==
| History | Symbols | Monarchy |
|---|---|---|
| Canadian Provinces and Territories | Canadian Provinces and Territories | Canadian Provinces and Territories |
National Historic Sites of Canada
Canadian Provinces and Territories

== Politics ==
| Politics | Monarchy | Lieutenant Governors |
|---|---|---|
| Canadian Provinces and Territories | Canadian Provinces and Territories | Canadian Provinces and Territories |
| Lists of Lieutenant Governors and Commissioners | Premier | Lists of premiers |
| Canadian Provinces and Territories | Canadian Provinces and Territories | Canadian Provinces and Territories |
| Parliament | Elections | Last Provincial Elections |
| Canadian Provinces and Territories | Canadian Provinces and Territories | Canadian Provinces and Territories |

== Other ==
| Scouting and Guiding | Same-sex marriage | Demographics |
|---|---|---|
| Canadian Provinces and Territories | Canadian Provinces and Territories | Canadian Provinces and Territories |
| Lists of Topics | Music | Higher Education |
| Canadian Provinces and Territories | Canadian Provinces and Territories | Canadian Provinces and Territories |
| Economy | First Nations of Canada | Postal codes |
| Canadian Provinces and Territories | Canadian Provinces and Territories | Canadian Provinces and Territories |
Climate change
Canadian Provinces and Territories

== Summary ==
| Topic | BC | AB | SK | MB | ON | QC | NB | NS | PEI | NL | YT | NT | NU |
|---|---|---|---|---|---|---|---|---|---|---|---|---|---|
| Politics | BC | AB | SK | MB | ON | QC | NB | NS | PEI | NL | YT | NT | NU |
| Lieutenant governors | BC | AB | SK | MB | ON | QC | NB | NS | PEI | NL | | NT | |
| Commissioners | | | | | | | | | | | YT | NT | NU |
| Lists of general elections | BC | AB | SK | MB | ON | QC | NB | NS | PEI | NL | YT | NT | NU |
| Legislative Assemblies | BC | AB | MN | SK | ON | QC | NB | NS | PEI | NL | YU | NT | NU |
| Lists of premiers | BC | AB | SK | MB | ON | QC | NB | NS | PEI | NL | YT | NT | NU |
| Premier | BC | AB | SK | MB | ON | QC | NB | NS | PEI | NL | YT | NT | NU |
| Monarchy | BC | AB | SK | MB | ON | QC | NB | NS | PEI | NL | YT | NT | NU |
| Same-sex marriage | BC | AB | SK | MB | ON | QC | NB | NS | PEI | NL | YT | NT | NU |
| Climate change | BC | AB | SK | MB | ON | QC | NB | NS | PEI | NL | YT | NT | NU |
| Geography | BC | AB | SK | MB | ON | QC | NB | NS | PEI | NL | YT | NT | NU |
| Demographics | BC | AB | SK | MB | ON | QC | NB | NS | PEI | NL | YT | NT | NU |
| Lists of communities | BC | AB | SK | MB | ON | QC | NB | NS | PEI | NL | YT | NT | NU |
| First Nations | BC | AB | SK | MB | ON | QC | NB | NS | PEI | NL | YT | NT | NU |
| Rivers | BC | AB | SK | MB | ON | QC | NB | NS | PEI | NL | YT | NT | NU |
| Census divisions | BC | AB | SK | MB | ON | QC | NB | NS | PEI | NL | YT | NT | NU |
| Parks | BC | AB | SK | MB | ON | QC | NB | NS | PEI | NL | YT | NT | NU |
| Lists of airports | BC | AB | SK | MB | ON | QC | NB | NS | PEI | NL | YT | NT | NU |
| Lists of highways | BC | AB | SK | MB | ON | QC | NB | NS | PEI | NL | YT | NT | NU |
| History | BC | AB | SK | MB | ON | QC | NB | NS | PEI | NL | YT | NT | NU |
| Symbols | BC | AB | SK | MB | ON | QC | NB | NS | PEI | NL | YT | NT | NU |
| Scouting and Guiding | BC | AB | SK | MB | ON | QC | NB | NS | PEI | NL | YT | NT | NU |
| Education | BC | AB | SK | MB | ON | QC | NB | NS | PEI | NL | YT | NT | NU |
| Higher education | BC | AB | SK | MB | ON | QC | NB | NS | PEI | NL | YT | NT | NU |
| Culture | BC | AB | SK | MB | ON | QC | NB | NS | PEI | NL | YT | NT | NU |
| Music | BC | AB | SK | MB | ON | QC | NB | NS | PEI | NL | YT | NT | NU |
| Tourism | BC | AB | SK | MB | ON | QC | NB | NS | PEI | NL | YT | NT | NU |
| Topics | BC | AB | SK | MB | ON | QC | NB | NS | PEI | NL | YT | NT | NU |

== Category ==
To display all subcategories below click on the ►

== See also ==
- Bibliography of Canadian provinces and territories
- Outline of Canada
