= Outline of Nunavut =

Overview and topical guide to Nunavut

The following outline is provided as an overview of and topical guide to Nunavut:

Flag of Nunavut

Coat of arms of Nunavut

Nunavut is the largest and newest territory of Canada. It was officially separated from the Northwest Territories via the Nunavut Act to provide the Inuit of the region a degree of self-government. Iqaluit is the capital and largest city.

== Geography of Nunavut ==
Geography of Nunavut

- Nunavut is: a territory of Canada
- Location:
  - The regions in which Nunavut is located are:
    - Northern Hemisphere, Western Hemisphere
      - Americas
        - North America
          - Northern America
            - Canada
              - Eastern Canada
  - Extreme points of Nunavut
- Population of Nunavut: 36,858
- Area of Nunavut: 2,093,190 km^{2} (808,190 sq mi)
- Atlas of Nunavut

=== Environment of Nunavut ===
- Protected areas of Nunavut
  - Historic places in Nunavut
    - National Historic Sites of Canada in Nunavut

==== Natural geographic features of Nunavut ====
- Lakes in Nunavut
- Rivers in Nunavut

==== Regions of Nunavut ====
- Communities in Nunavut
- Municipalities in Nunavut

=== Demographics of Nunavut ===
- Demographics of Nunavut

== Government and politics of Nunavut ==
- Elections of Nunavut
  - General elections of Nunavut
- Political parties in Nunavut

=== Government of Nunavut ===
==== Executive branch of the government of Nunavut ====
- Premier of Nunavut
  - Premiers of Nunavut
- Commissioner of Nunavut
- Executive Council of Nunavut

==== Legislative branch of the government of Nunavut ====
- Nunavut Legislative Assembly

==== Judicial branch of the government of Nunavut ====
- Nunavut Court of Justice
- Nunavut Court of Appeal

=== Law of Nunavut ===
- Same-sex marriage in Nunavut

== History of Nunavut ==
- History of Nunavut

== Culture of Nunavut ==
- Museums in Nunavut
- Music of Nunavut
- People of Nunavut
  - List of people from Nunavut
- Religion in Nunavut
  - Christianity in Nunavut
    - Diocese of the Arctic
- Scouting and Guiding in Nunavut
- Symbols of Nunavut
  - Coat of arms of Nunavut
  - Flag of Nunavut

== Economy and infrastructure of Nunavut ==
- Communication in Nunavut
  - Radio stations in Nunavut
  - Television transmitters in Nunavut
- Energy in Nunavut
  - Electricity generating stations in Nunavut
- Transport in Nunavut
  - Air transport in Nunavut
    - Airports in Nunavut
  - Vehicular transport in Nunavut
    - Vehicle registration plates of Nunavut
    - Road system in Nunavut
      - Territorial highways of Nunavut

== Education in Nunavut ==
- List of schools in Nunavut
- Museums in Nunavut
- Higher education in Nunavut
