= Bibliography of Canadian provinces and territories =

Works on the provinces and territories of Canada

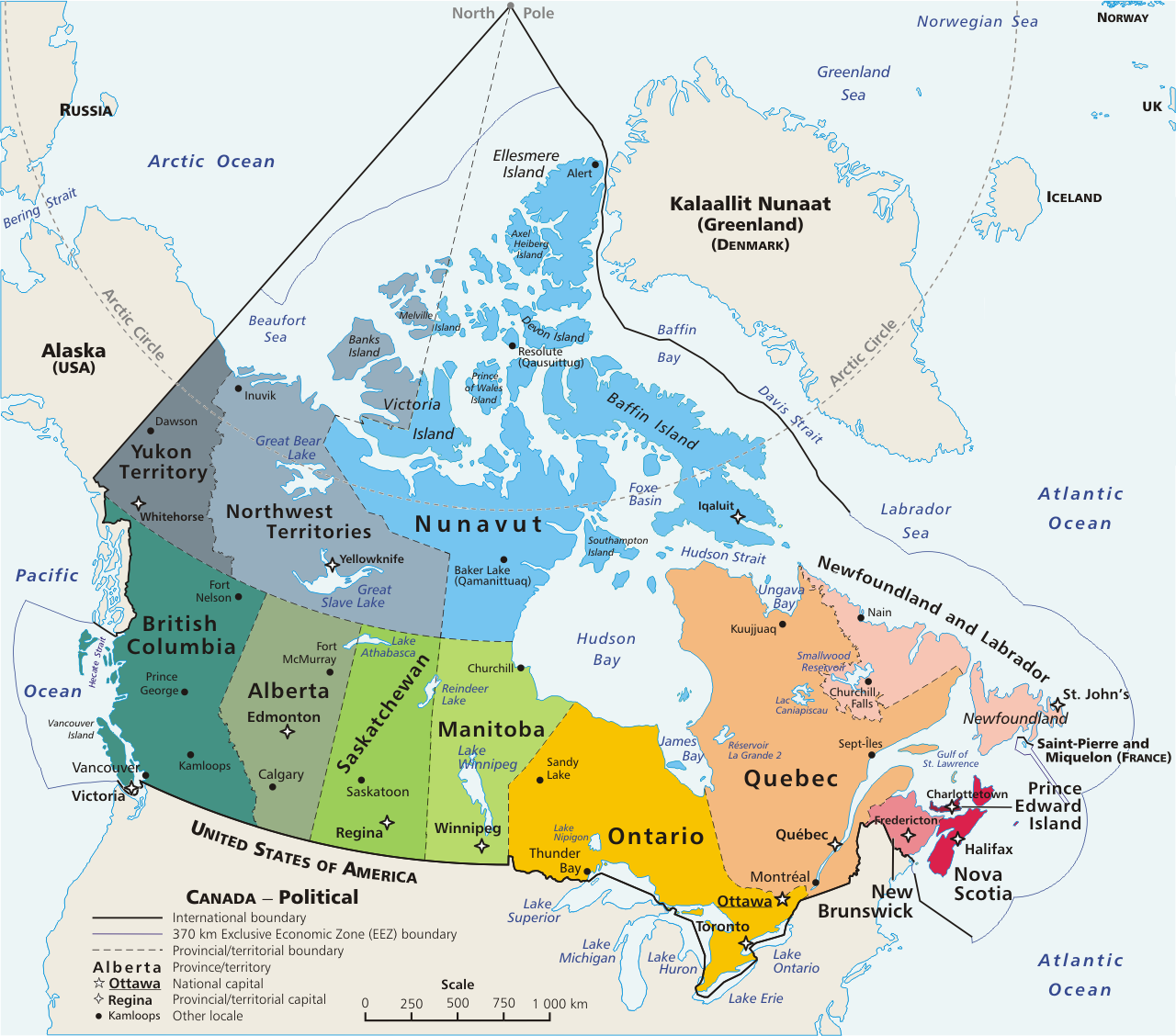
An enlargeable map of Canada, showing its ten provinces and three territories.

This is a bibliography of works on the Provinces and territories of Canada mainly compiled in 2011 from the Canadiana : the national bibliography with arbitrary additions since then.

== Provinces and territories ==
=== Alberta ===
- Berry, Susan; Jack Brink (2004), Aboriginal Cultures in Alberta: Five Hundred Generations, Provincial Museum of Alberta, ISBN 0-7785-2852-9
- Cavanaugh, Catherine Anne (2006), Alberta formed, Alberta transformed, Volume 1, University of Alberta Press, ISBN 1-55238-194-3
- Connors, Richard; John M. Law (2005), Forging Alberta's constitutional framework, University of Alberta - Centre for Constitutional Studies, ISBN 0-88864-457-4
- Holt, Faye Reineberg (2009), Alberta: A History in Photographs, Heritage House; Lancaster : Gazelle, ISBN 9781894974875
- Melnyk, George (1999), The literary history of Alberta, University of Alberta Press, ISBN 0-88864-296-2
- Taylor, Alison (2001), The politics of educational reform in Alberta, University of Toronto Press, ISBN 0-8020-4813-7

=== British Columbia ===
- Akrigg, G. P. V; Akrigg, Helen B (1997), British Columbia place names, Univ. of British Columbia Press, ISBN 0-7748-0636-2
- Barman, Jean (2007), The West beyond the West: a history of British Columbia, Univ. of Toronto Press, ISBN 978-0802093097
- Dawson, Michael (2005), Selling British Columbia: Tourism and Consumer Culture, 1890-1970, Univ. of British Columbia Press, ISBN 978-0-7748-1055-5
- Foster, Leslie T (2007), People, politics, and child welfare in British Columbia, Univ. of British Columbia Press, ISBN 9780774813723
- Harris, R Cole (1997), The resettlement of British Columbia : essays on colonialism and geographical change, Univ. of British Columbia Press, ISBN 0774805889
- McKee, Christopher (2000), Treaty talks in British Columbia: negotiating a mutually beneficial future, Univ. of British Columbia Press, ISBN 0-7748-0824-1
- McGillivray, Brett (2000), Geography of British Columbia: people and landscapes in transition, Univ. of British Columbia Press, ISBN 0774807849
- Muckle, Robert James (1998), The First Nations of British Columbia: an anthropological survey, Univ. of British Columbia Press, ISBN 0-7748-0663-X
- Thirkell, Fred; Bob Scullion (2002), British Columbia 100 years ago: portraits of a province, Heritage House Pub, ISBN 1-894384-49-0
- Ver Berkmoes, Ryan; John Lee (2007), Guide to "British Columbia", Lonely Planet, ISBN 9781741045840

=== Manitoba ===
- Friesen, Gerald; Potyondi, Barry. A Guide to the Study of Manitoba Local History. Winnipeg: University of Manitoba Press; 1981 (ISBN 0-88755-121-1)
- Hébert, Raymond M. Manitoba's French-Language Crisis: A Cautionary Tale. Montreal: McGill-Queen's University Press; 2004 (ISBN 0-7735-2790-7)

=== New Brunswick ===
- McNutt, W.S. New Brunswick: A history: 1784-1867 MacMillan, 1963 (still the standard history). 496 pp.
- MacFarlane, William G. New Brunswick Bibliography: The books and writers of the province. Saint John, 1895.

=== Newfoundland and Labrador ===
- Cadigan, Sean Thomas (2009). Newfoundland and Labrador: a history. University of Toronto Press. ISBN 978-0-8020-4465-5.
- Hiller, James; Neary, Peter (1994). Twentieth-century Newfoundland: explorations. Breakwater. ISBN 1-55081-072-3.
- Clarke, Sandra (2010). Newfoundland English. Edinburgh University Press. ISBN 978-0-7486-2616-8.
- Wilson, Donald; Ryan, Stanley (1990). Legends of Newfoundland & Labrador. Jesperson. ISBN 0-921692-40-4.

=== Nova Scotia ===
- "The Nova Scotia Atlas", Nova Scotia Geomatics Centre, Province of Nova Scotia, 2006, ISBN 0-88780-707-0
- Creighton, Helen (1966), Songs and Ballads from Nova Scotia, Dover Publications, ISBN 0-486-21703-5
- Griffiths, N.E.S. (2005). From Migrant to Acadian: A North American Border People, 1604-1755. McGill-Queen's University Press. ISBN 978-0-7735-2699-0.
- Grenier, John (2008). The Far Reaches of Empire: War in Nova Scotia, 1710-1760. University of Oklahoma Press. ISBN 978-0-8061-3876-3.
- John G. Reid. The 'Conquest' of Acadia, 1710: Imperial, Colonial, an Aboriginal Constructions University of Toronto Press. 2004 ISBN 0-8020-3755-0

=== Ontario ===
- Beckett, Harry (2001). Ontario. Weigl Educational Publishers Limited. ISBN 978-1-894705-04-2.
- Craig, Gerald M Upper Canada: the formative years 1784-1841 McClelland and Stewart, 1963, the standard history online edition
- Craven, Paul, ed. Labouring Lives: Work and Workers in Nineteenth-Century Ontario (University of Toronto Press, 1995)
- Dunham, Eileen Political unrest in Upper Canada 1815-1836 McClelland and Stewart, 1963.
- Errington, Jane The Lion, the Eagle, and Upper Canada: A Developing Colonial Ideology McGill-Queen's University Press, 1987.
- Drummond, Ian M. Progress Without Planning: The Economic History of Ontario from Confederation to the Second World War (1987)
- Montigny, Edgar-André; Chambers, Anne Lorene (2000). Ontario since Confederation: a reader. University of Toronto Press. ISBN 0-8020-4444-1.
- Schull, Joseph. Ontario since 1867 (1978) 400pp; general survey emphasizing politics
- Whitcomb, Dr. Ed. A Short History of Ontario. (Ottawa. From Sea To Sea Enterprises, 2006) ISBN 0-9694667-6-5. 79 pp.
- White, Randall (1985). Ontario, 1610-1985: a political and economic history. Dundurn Press. ISBN 0-919670-98-9. "Ontario.", general survey emphasizing politics

=== Prince Edward Island ===
- Whitcomb, Dr. Ed. A Short History of Prince Edward Island Ottawa. From Sea To Sea Enterprises, 2010. ISBN 978-0-9865967-1-1. 56 pp.

=== Quebec ===
- Courville, Serge; Richard Howard (2009), Quebec: A Historical Geography, Univ of British Columbia Press, ISBN 9780774814263
- Dickinson, John Alexander; Brian J. Young (2003), A short history of Quebec, McGill-Queen's University Press, ISBN 0-7735-2393-6
- Gauvreau, Michael (2005), The Catholic origins of Quebec's Quiet Revolution, 1931-1970, McGill-Queen's University Press, ISBN 0-7735-2874-1
- Kokker, Steve (2002), Québec, Lonely Planet, ISBN 1-74059-024-4
- Maclure, Jocelyn (2003), Quebec identity: the challenge of pluralism, McGill-Queen's University Press, ISBN 0-7735-2553-X
- Taucar, Christopher Edward (2002), Canadian Federalism and Quebec Sovereignty, Peter Lang, ISBN 0-8204-6242-X
- Scott, Colin (2001), Aboriginal autonomy and development in northern Quebec and Labrador, UBC Press, ISBN 0-7748-0844-6

=== Saskatchewan ===
- Bennett, John W. and Kohl, Seena B. Settling the Canadian-American West, 1890-1915. University of Nebraska Press, 1995. 311 pp.
- Lipset, Seymour M. Agrarian Socialism: The Cooperative Commonwealth Federation in Saskatchewan: A Study in Political Sociology. University of California Press, 1950.
- Porter, Jene M (2008), Perspectives of Saskatchewan, University of Manitoba Press, ISBN 978-0-88755-183-3
- Veldhuis, Niels (2009), Saskatchewan Prosperity: Building on Success, Fraser Institute

=== Northwest Territories ===
- Coates, Kenneth (1985), Canada's colonies: a history of the Yukon and Northwest Territories, Lorimer, ISBN 0-88862-931-1
- Choquette, Robert (1995), The Oblate assault on Canada's northwest, University of Ottawa Press, ISBN 0-7766-0402-3
- Ecosystem Classification Group, and Northwest Territories. Ecological Regions of the Northwest Territories Taiga Plains.
- Morrison, William (1998), True North: The Yukon and Northwest Territories, Oxford University Press, ISBN 9780195410457

=== Nunavut ===
- Alia, Valerie. (2007) Names and Nunavut Culture and Identity in Arctic Canada. New York: Berghahn Books. ISBN 1-84545-165-1
- Henderson, Ailsa. (2007) Nunavut: Rethinking Political Culture. Vancouver: University of British Columbia Press. ISBN 0-7748-1423-3
- Dahl, Jens; Hicks, Jack; Jull, Peter (2002), Nunavut : Inuit regain control of their lands and their lives, International Work Group for Indigenous Affairs, ISBN 87-90730-34-8
- Kulchyski, Peter Keith. (2005) Like the Sound of a Drum: Aboriginal Cultural Politics in Denendeh and Nunavut. Winnipeg: University of Manitoba Press. ISBN 0-88755-178-5

=== Yukon ===
- Coates, Kenneth (1985), Canada's colonies: a history of the Yukon and Northwest Territories, Lorimer, ISBN 0-88862-931-1
- Coates, Ken S. & Morrison, William R. (1988), Land of the Midnight Sun: A History of the Yukon, Edmonton: Hurtig Publishers, ISBN 0-88830-331-9
- Cody, William J (2000), Flora of the Yukon Territory, National Research Press, ISBN 0-660-18110-X
- Hart, Ann (2000), Alaska and the Yukon, JPM Publications, ISBN 2-88452-051-1
- Laguna, Frederica De (2000), Travels among the Dena : exploring Alaska's Yukon Valley, Univ. of Washington Press, ISBN 0-295-97902-X
- O'Reilly, Shauna; Brennan O'Reilly (2009), Alaska Yukon Pacific Exposition, Arcadia Pub, ISBN 978-0-7385-7132-4
- Webb, Melody (1993), Yukon: The Last Frontier, University of British Columbia Press, ISBN 0-7748-0441-6

== History by region ==
=== Atlantic ===
- Beck, J. Murray. The Government of Nova Scotia (1957), a standard history
- Beck, J. Murray. Politics of Nova Scotia. vol 2: 1896-1988. (1985) 438 pp
- Cadigan, Sean T. Newfoundland and Labrador: A History U. of Toronto Press, 2009. Standard scholarly history
- Choyce, Lesley. Nova Scotia: Shaped by the Sea. A Living History. (1996). 305 pp.
- Faragher, John Mack. A Great and Noble Scheme: The Tragic Story of the Expulsion of the French Acadians from Their American Homeland(2005), 562 p.
- Fay, C. R.; Life and Labour in Newfoundland University of Toronto Press, 1956
- Gwyn, Julian. Excessive Expectations: Maritime Commerce and the Economic Development of Nova Scotia, 1740-1870(1998) 291 pp.
- Harris, Leslie. Newfoundland and Labrador: A Brief History (1968)
- MacKay; R. A. Newfoundland; Economic, Diplomatic, and Strategic Studies Oxford University Press, (1946)
- McGahan, E., Ritcey, J., MacLeod, J., & Pigot, F. (1996). Recent Publications Relating to the History of the Atlantic Region. Acadiensis, 26(1), 102–135.
- Rowe, Frederick. History of Newfoundland and Labrador (1980).
- Smallwood, Joseph, ed. The Encyclopedia of Newfoundland and Labrador (2nd ed. 1984), 2 vol.; also cd-rom edition
- Whitelaw, William Menzies; The Maritimes and Canada before Confederation (1934) online

=== Prairies and BC ===
- Archer, John H. Saskatchewan: A History. Saskatoon: Western Producer Prairie Books, 1980. 422 pp.
- Barman, Jean. The West Beyond the West: A History of British Columbia U. of Toronto Press, 1991. 430pp
- Barnhart, Gordon L., ed. Saskatchewan Premiers of the Twentieth Century. Regina: Canadian Plains Research Center, 2004. 418 pp.
- Bocking, D. H., ed. Pages from the Past: Essays on Saskatchewan History. Saskatoon: Western Producer Prairie Books, 1979. 299 pp.
- Boswell, Randy. Province with a Heart: Celebrating 100 Years in Saskatchewan (2005) 224pp, popular history excerpts and text search
- Encyclopedia of Saskatchewan (2006) from U. of Regina Canadian Plains Research Center, (2005); 1071pp in print edition; article by experts on a very wide range of topics
- Francis, Daniel, ed. Encyclopedia of British Columbia. Madeira Park, B.C.: Harbour, 2000. 806 pp.
- Friesen, Gerald. The Canadian Prairies: A History (2nd ed. 1987)
- Griffin, Harold. Radical Roots: The Shaping of British Columbia. Vancouver: Commonwealth Fund, 1999.
- Heritage Community Foundation. Alberta Online Encyclopedia, online 2009, a short encyclopedia
- Johnston, Hugh, ed. The Pacific Province: A History of British Columbia. (Douglas & McIntyre, 1996). 352 pp.
- Loewen, Royden. "On the Margin or in the Lead: Canadian Prairie Historiography," Agricultural History 73, no. 1 (Winter 1999): 27–45. in JSTOR
- MacGregor, James A. A History of Alberta. Edmonton, Alta.: Hurtig, 1972. 335 pp.
- McGillivray, Brett. Geography of British Columbia: People and Landscapes in Transition (U. of British Columbia Press, 2000). 235pp
- Ormsby, Margaret A. (1958). British Columbia: A History. Macmillan – via Questia.
- Palmer, Howard. Alberta: A New History (1999), standard survey by leading historian
- Pitsula, James M. "Disparate Duo" Beaver 2005 85(4): 14–24, a comparison of Saskatchewan with Alberta, Fulltext in EBSCO
- Porter, Jene M., ed. Perspectives of Saskatchewan (University of Manitoba Press, 2009.) Pp. 377, 18 essays by scholars in several disciplines
- Richards, J. Howard and K.I. Fung, eds. Atlas of Saskatchewan (1969)
- Waiser, Bill. Saskatchewan: A New History (2005), 563 pp. a major scholarly survey
- Wardhaugh, Robert A., ed. Toward Defining the Prairies: Region, Culture, and History. (2001). 234 pp.
- Woodcock, George. British Columbia: A History of the Province. Vancouver: Douglas & McIntyre, 1990. 288 pp.

== Primary sources ==
- Owram, Douglas R., ed. The Formation of Alberta: A Documentary History. Calgary: Hist. Soc. of Alberta, 1979. 403 pp. primary sources
- Moore, Christopher; Slavin, Bill; Janet Lunn (2002), The Big Book of Canada: Exploring the Provinces and Territories, Tundra Books, ISBN 0-88776-457-6

== See also ==
- Bibliography of Canada
- Bibliography of Canadian history
- Bibliography of Canadian military history
- Canadian provincial and territorial name etymologies
- List of Canada-related topics by provinces and territories
- List of Canadian provinces and territories by gross domestic product
- Population of Canada by province and territory
- Territorial evolution of Canada
