= Index of Nunavut-related articles =

Articles relating to Nunavut include:

== 0-9 ==
- .nt.ca

== A ==
- Airports in Nunavut
- Airlines in Nunavut

== C ==
- Coat of arms of Nunavut
- Climate of Nunavut
- Culture of Nunavut
- Communities in Nunavut

== D ==
- Demographics of Nunavut

== E ==
- Economy of Nunavut
- Executive Council of Nunavut

== Z ==
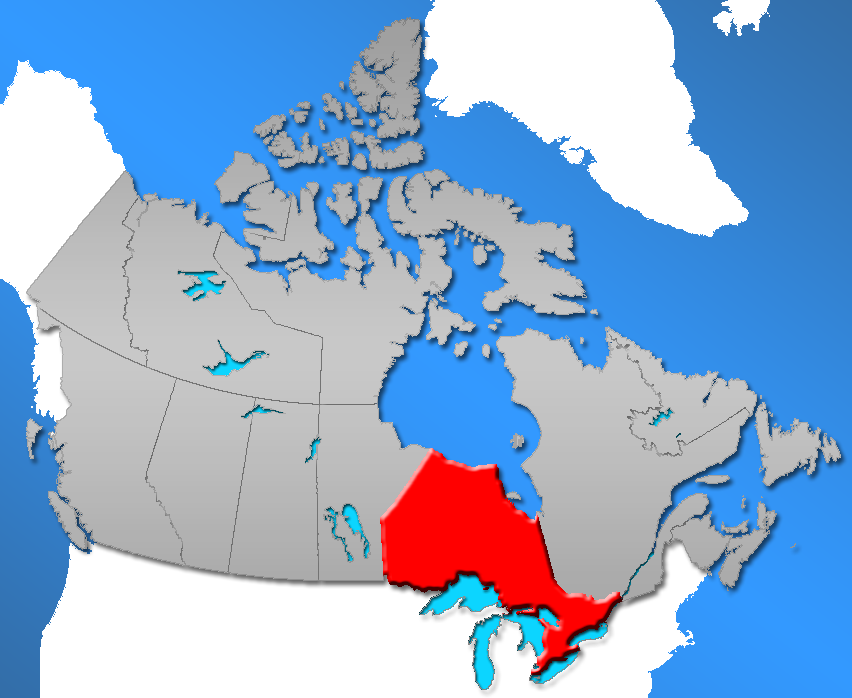
Lists of topics by provinces and territories
