= Climate change in Nunavut =

Climate change in Nunavut affects various environments and industries.

== Greenhouse gas emissions ==
Between 2005 and 2021, annual greenhouse gas emissions increased by 25%.

== Impacts of climate change ==
=== Country food ===
Climate change is reducing access to country food.

=== Hunting ===
Hunting has been made more difficult due to ice melting.

=== Polar bear attacks ===
Attacks by polar bear have increased due to melting ice forcing them to spend more time on land.

== Response ==
On two separate occasions, the Nunavut government released strategy documents relating to dealing with climate change but did not release implementation plans, partially due to human resources issues.

=== Policies ===
In 2018, Nunavut had no target for greenhouse gas emission reduction.

After the federal government imposed a carbon tax, Nunavut residents received a tax credit - originally this was $308 but this was later decreased to $100.

The Government of Nunavut pushed the government to allow tourism, recreational and outfitting activities in the Tuvaijuittuq Marine Protected Area in the High Arctic.

== See also ==
- Climate change in Canada
