= Climate change in Nova Scotia =

Climate change in Canadian province

Climate change in the Canadian province of Nova Scotia affects various environments and industries, including fishing.

== Greenhouse gas emissions ==
In 2024, 40.5% of the province's emissions were due to electricity generation, transmission and distribution. Emissions in the province decreased by 30% over the period from 2005 to 2014.

== Impacts of climate change ==
Climate change has led to reduced productivity for farming.

== Response ==
=== Policies ===
In 2024, the Nova Scotia government released its climate action plan, which was criticized by the Canadian Centre for Policy Alternatives as relying too much on technological change and not relying enough on cultural change. In 2025, the Nova Scotia government moved to revoke the uranium mining ban, which had been in place since 2009.

=== Legislation ===
==== Environmental Goals and Climate Change Reduction Act ====
Management of Greenhouse Gas Act

Nova Scotia House of Assembly
- Citation: SNS 2021, c 20

Legislative history
- Bill citation: Bill No. 57
- Introduced by: Tim Halman, Minister of Environment and Climate Change
- First reading: 2021-10-27
- Second reading: 2021-10-28
- Third reading: 2021-11-04

Keywords
- emissions targets, carbon tax
- Status: In force

The Act included provision for:

- phasing out coal to generate electricity by 2030
- requiring reducing emissions 53% compared to 2030
- phasing in renewable energy to generate 80% of all electricity in the province by 2030
- requiring at least 20% of total land and water mass in the province
- developing a provincial food strategy and supporting consumption of "local food"
- modernizing the environmental assessment process to include consideration of "cumulative impacts"
- requiring that at least 30% of vehicles sold in the province are would be zero-emission

At the amendments committee for the bill, many people suggested strengthening the targets.

== See also ==
- Climate change in Canada
- Uranium mining in Nova Scotia
