= Climate change in Manitoba =

Climate and Green Plan Act

Legislative Assembly of Manitoba
- Citation: C.C.S.M. c. C134
- Assented to: 2018-11-08
- Commenced: 2018-11-08
- Bill citation: Bill 16, Schedule A

Keywords
- emissions targets, carbon tax
- Status: In force

Climate change in Manitoba affects various environments and industries, including agriculture.

== Greenhouse gas emissions ==
Emissions in Manitoba increased by 20% compared to 2007.

== Impacts of climate change ==
=== Temperature ===
Hot spells are expected to become hotter and longer in duration, and cold spells are expected to become colder and longer in duration.

== Response ==
=== Policies ===
Manitoba implemented an electric vehicle rebate scheme to increase take-up, which had been suggested by the automotive industry after the federal government released plans for new cars to become emission-free by 2035. The first zero-emission fuel cell bus was unveiled in February 2025 as part of a target to reach a fully zero-emission fleet by 2045.

=== Legislation ===
==== Climate and Green Plan Act ====
The Manitoba government released what it called the "Made-in-Manitoba Climate and Green Plan". The plan outlined a carbon tax, with exemptions for "purple fuel".

The Act was planned to implement a $25 per tonne carbon tax. This was described as the Manitoba government thumbing its nose at the federal government.government, because it was half the federal government's target of $50 per tonne.

== See also ==
- Climate change in Canada
