= Tourism in Nunavut =

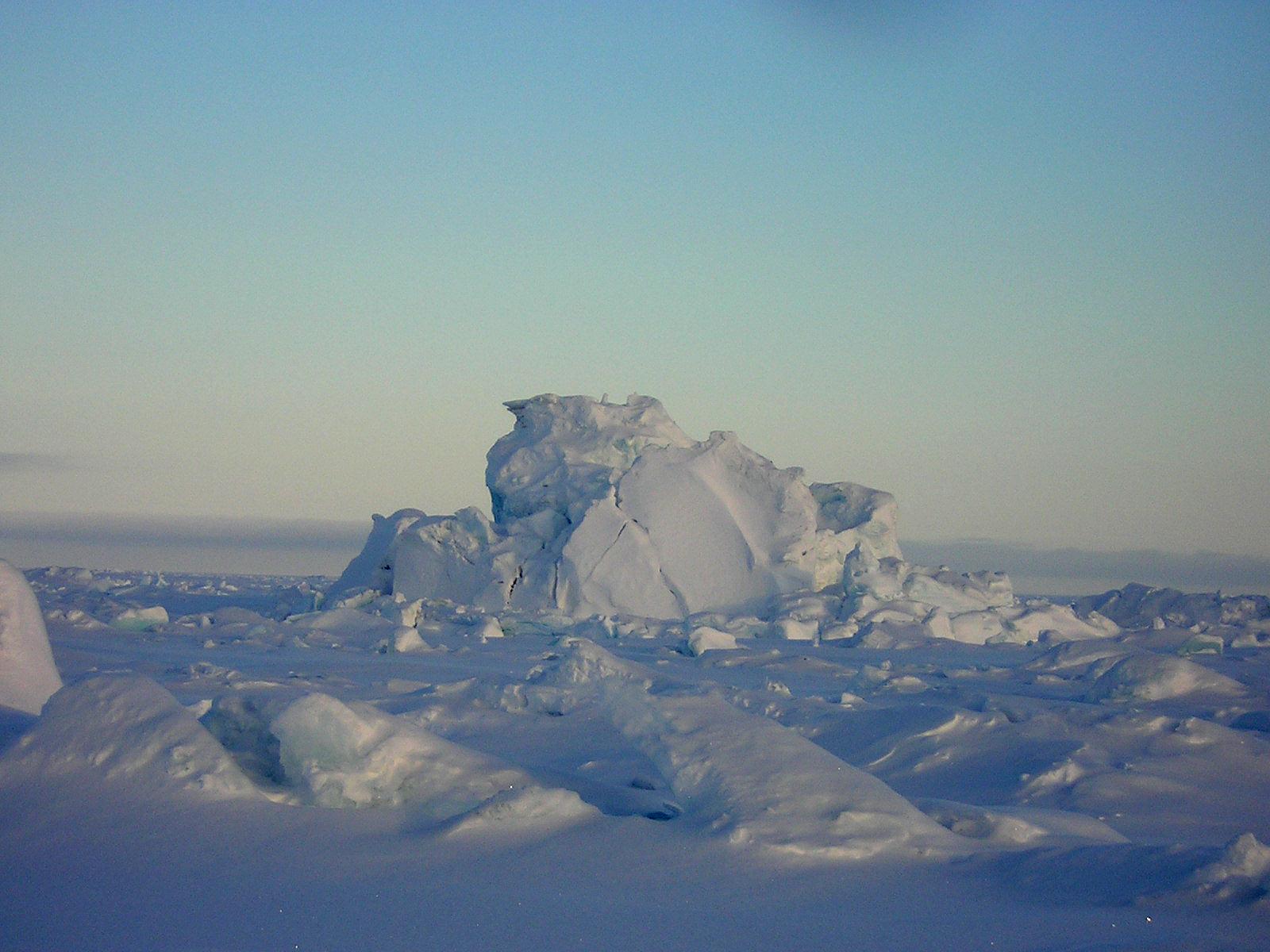
An iceberg at Resolute Bay

Tourism in Nunavut focuses on outdoor activities and on the culture of the local Inuit, the indigenous people of Nunavut. Wildlife watching is a popular attraction, as the territory holds a number of wildlife and bird sanctuaries; walrus, polar bears, belugas and a wide variety of birds can be seen across the territory. Outdoor adventure activities are also popular. Nunavut's long river system supports canoeing and kayaking for experienced travellers, and its expanse of uninhabited land offers opportunities for hiking and camping. The extreme conditions and remote location mean that a guide is usually necessary, even for experienced campers.

Nunavut Tourism does not regularly publish tourism statistics. An exit survey conducted by the Department of Economic Development and Transportation between June and October 2008 recorded 33,378 visitors during that period, up from 28,802 in June–October 2006. Most visitors are Canadian: 96 percent of business travellers were domestic, though the leisure market is less dominated by Canadians, who accounted for 72 percent of leisure arrivals.

== Attractions ==
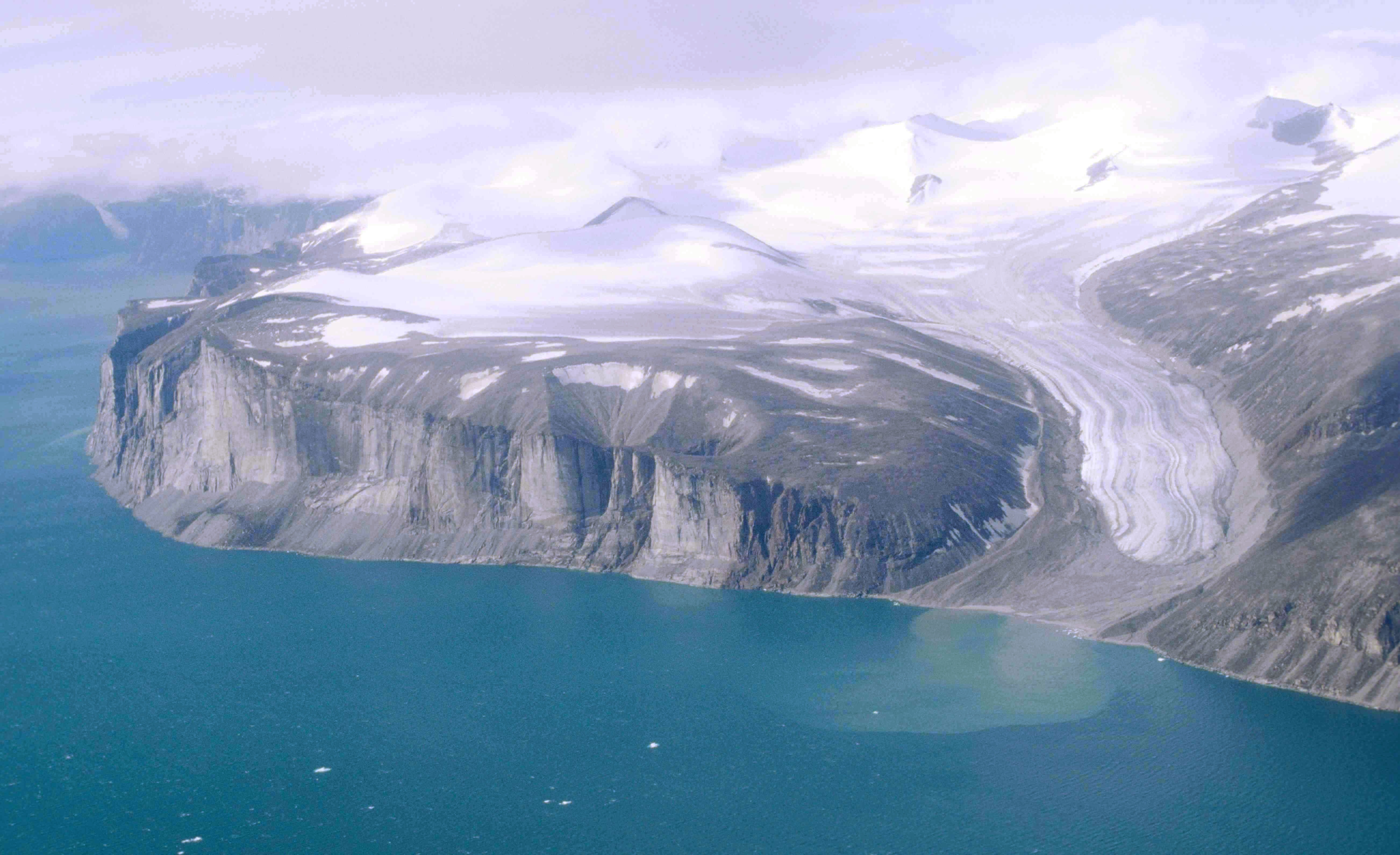
Coast of the Remote Peninsula in Sam Ford Fjord in northeast Baffin Island

Nunavut's vast uninhabited area supports a range of outdoor adventure activities. Wildlife watching is one of the more popular – the territory is home to walrus and belugas, as well as eleven bird sanctuaries housing millions of birds. Muskox are also found throughout Nunavut, although the territory's tourism authority does not promote 'muskox watching' trips specifically. The territory is also home to a population of polar bears, and trips designed to increase tourists' chances of spotting a polar bear are common. A number of private operators offer wildlife, bird, polar and whale watching tours, in addition to other activities.

Other popular activities involve the Canadian territory's opportunities for adventuring. Canoeing and kayaking are possible on the territory's long rivers, the best known of which is the Thelon River. The Thelon is busiest in summer. It has no direct road access, but many visitors canoe or kayak it each year, as it is less difficult to navigate than some other rivers in Nunavut. Hiking is another popular activity. Nunavut Tourism lists both short and long routes, and promotes camping at sites including caribou birthing grounds and the river at Whale Cove. Because of the rugged terrain and extreme conditions, it recommends that anyone camping overnight use a guide.

One activity particular to the Arctic north is iceberg watching. Between April and July, icebergs can be watched moving down rivers as the surrounding ice melts. Watching the floe edge is also popular in this period, because of the wildlife movement it brings. Whales can often be seen swimming metres from the ice, polar bears can be observed swimming briefly in the icy water and amphibious animals often bring themselves up onto dry land or onto the ice to sunbathe.

== Statistics ==
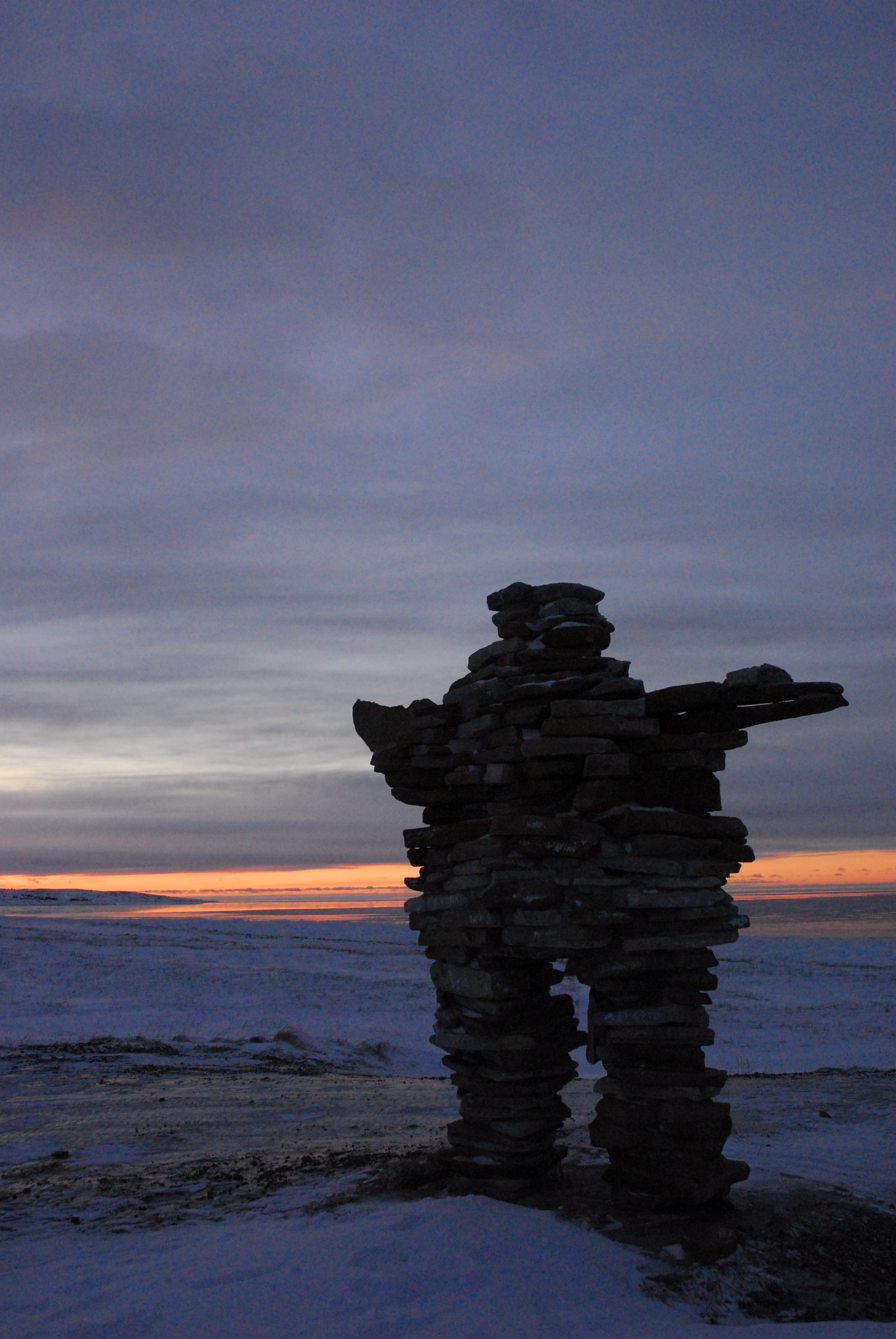
An inukshuk at sunset.

Nunavut Tourism did not, as of 2002, produce detailed statistics about tourism numbers, trends and characteristics. However, by 2010, this appeared to have changed, with Nunavut Tourism providing media outlets with general figures on trends in tourism in Nunavut. Tourism brings approximately CAD $30 million to Nunavut's economy each year according to Nunavut Tourism, with one in five of its tourists arriving on cruise ships. Between June and October 2008, 33,378 people visited Nunavut by air and sea, according to the territory's Department of Economic Development and Transportation. That was an increase of almost 16 percent over the 28,802 recorded for the same period in 2006. In 2019, over 4200 cruise ship visitors came to Nunavut. The average age of people arriving in Nunavut was 46 during the period in 2008 that the Department of Economic Development and Transportation conducted its survey, and the majority of visitors were in the territory for business purposes. 96 percent of all business travellers entering the territory were domestic travellers (Canadian residents). Among leisure travellers the domestic proportion is lower: Canadians account for 72 percent of arrivals, with the United States (20 percent) and other countries (8 percent) making up the difference. September and July account for 46 percent of arrivals, making them the busiest arrival months.

The most popular tourist destination among arrivals to Nunavut was Qikiqtaaluk (Baffin Island), home to the territory's capital, Iqaluit. Visitors to Baffin Island comprised 63 percent of all travellers to Nunavut. 11 percent visited the Kivalliq Region, seven percent travelled to the Kitikmeot Region and the remainder were cruise ship passengers who visited a number of Nunavut towns during their journeys. 76 percent of visitors to the Kivalliq Region travelled for business, leisure tourism was the most popular reason given for travel to the Kitikmeot Region, and visiting friends and family was the most popular reason given for travel to Baffin Island. 21 cruise ships visited Nunavut communities in 2009.

== Market issues ==
In the 2002 Nunavut Tourism publication The Time is Right: A Vision and Strategy for Tourism Development in Nunavut, a number of issues facing Nunavut tourism operators were highlighted. One major issue for the industry is the territory's remoteness, which imposes high travel costs on visitors and drives numbers down. Nunavut's position north of the Arctic Circle also reduces the scope for spring activities and produces a strongly seasonal market, which limits year-round employment. Many tourism organisations and operators faced difficulty attracting high-quality staff members to their ranks, and experienced high levels of turnover. There are limited links between tourism operators, inhibiting opportunities for inter-sector growth.

Governmental and human resource issues also exist. Training levels among tourism employees are often low. Interest in tourism development is limited in many Nunavut governmental organisations and in the private sector, and a policy intended to prevent "market disruption" by new businesses has led to licences being denied because of the competition the applicants would bring. That policy has restricted both competition and industry growth. Finally, a lack of in-depth and relevant statistics about trends and growth in tourism in Nunavut has prevented businesses from planning for their short- and long-term futures.
