= Climate change in Prince Edward Island =

Climate change in the Canadian province of Prince Edward Island affects various environments and industries, including fishing and farming.

== Greenhouse gas emissions ==
As of 2025, Prince Edward Island's emissions are 16% below its 2005 emissions. Prince Edward Island's greenhouse gas targets would require less than 1.2 million tonnes of emissions per year in 2030.

== Impacts of climate change ==
=== Fish and farming ===
In 2020, there was an increase in the number of "chub" mackerel being caught by PEI fishermen and the number of lobster landings in PEI waters, compared to previous years. Potato yields would be expected to decrease by between 5% to 10% over the 50 years from 2024.

=== Infrastructure and built environment ===
There are expected to be 500 buildings in downtown Charlottestown which would become "at risk" over the 75 years from 2025 to 2100.

== Response ==
=== Policies ===
==== Shoreline management plans ====
The Prince Edward Island government has developed plans to manage coastal areas, but they lack a land-use component.

=== Legislation ===
==== Climate Leadership Act ====
Climate Leadership Act

Legislative Assembly of Prince Edward Island
- Citation: RSPEI 1988, c C-9.1

Keywords
- emissions targets, carbon tax
- Status: In force

The Climate Leadership Act was implemented the province's carbon tax of 4.4 cents per litre on gasoline and 4.4 cents per litre on diesel. This was introduced at the same time as a separate bill which reduced the carbon tax, which was criticised as being more about politics rather than reducing emissions. The Green Party of Prince Edward Island proposed changing the emissions target in the legislation from 1.4 million tonnes of greenhouse gases to 1.2 million tonnes.

==== Net-zero Carbon Act ====
Net-zero Carbon Act

Legislative Assembly of Prince Edward Island
- Citation: SPEI 2020, c 90

Keywords
- emissions targets
- Status: In force

Following the proposal from the Green Party, the Climate Leadership Act was amended, with the amendment bill receiving support from all three parties in the Legislative Assembly. The Act requires Prince Edward Island to reach net zero emissions by 2040. The Act has been described very positively: "foundations of a good climate plan". The Act requires the implementation of a multistakeholder advisory panel.

In the one year after the passage of the Act, emissions rose by 2.8%.

== See also ==
- Climate change in Canada
