= Climate change in Quebec =

Climate change has social, environmental and economic effects on the province of Quebec, and the topic is present in the province's public discussion, politics and thought. Climate in Quebec has been found to be warming at a higher rate than the average worldwide change, with some sources alleging a rate twice the global average. This is consistent with findings that northern environments tend to heat up faster than the global average for multiple reasons, including changes in albedo due to diminishing ice and snow cover, particularly in the Arctic.

== Impacts of climate change in Quebec ==
=== Forest fires ===
The risk and intensity of forest fires in Quebec and the rest of Canada have been shown to be increased by anthropogenic climate change.

==== 2023 forest fires ====
Summer 2023's intense, record-breaking fire season was fuelled by unusually hot and dry weather conditions and early snowmelt associated to climate change. The province's forest cover was extensively damaged, with an approximative 4.5 million hectares burnt in Quebec alone, and a total of 15 million hectares across Canada. Several impacts, beyond the impacts on the forests' ecosystems, occurred, Smoke traveled extreme distances and reduced air quality, reaching New York City, Europe and even northwestern China. Some communities (Non-Indigenous and Indigenous) were forced to evacuate to avoid the fires. From a monetary perspective, the economic damage has been estimated by some to be approximately 8 billion dollars (CAD).

=== Changes in precipitation patterns ===
With climate change, precipitation patterns, abundance and the frequency of extreme events are changing. Yearly precipitations have increased over the past decades, and intense precipitation events in Quebec are projected to become more common as climate change worsens. These increases may in turn lead to an increase in flood risk and therefore likelihood of climate-related damages.

==== Floods ====
Increases in flood frequency, extent and intensity linked to climate change are projected for Quebec. Some papers also suggest that climate change-linked increases in floods are already ongoing. Floods are particularly dangerous by...

- physically harming people directly (drowning, blunt force) but also indirectly (through the spread of diseases);
- psychologically harming people;
- damaging or destroying infrastructure

Changes in flood predictions have caused ripples in the public sphere due to their impact on property values and property building.

=== Agriculture ===
Impacts of climate change on agriculture in Quebec are mixed. The main positive impact is an increase in yearly productivity for certain crops due to a longer growing season. However, other crops may instead see their productivity decline. Dry periods, intense precipitation, changes in freeze-thaw patterns, and new invasive species now surviving in Quebec due to the warmer annual temperatures can also destroy crops. Some of these climate change-related impacts were felt by some vegetable producers in 2023.

=== Seasonal changes ===
Winters in Quebec are expected to see warmer temperatures, less snow and more rain. This may have significant impacts on activities that depend on snow, such as ski, their operation and associated economic revenue.

=== Pest proliferation ===
Warming associated to climate change supports the rapid spread northwards of the black-legged tick (Ixodes scapularis), which can transmit the bacteria causing Lyme disease to humans in Quebec.

=== Eco-anxiety ===
Many Quebec residents have reported feeling eco-anxiety related to climate change. A 2021 Léger poll revealed that 73% of consulted adults between the ages of 18 and 34 in Quebec reported feeling eco-anxiety, and in 2022-2023, the governmental Institut de la statistique du Québec conducted a research on secondary school students, of which the majority disclosed feeling eco-anxiety at least "sometimes".

== Government ==
=== Ministère de l’Environnement, de la Lutte contre les changements climatiques, de la Faune et des Parcs (MELCCFP) ===
The Ministère de l'Environnement, de la Lutte contre les changements climatiques, de la Faune et des Parcs, often abbreviated to MELCCFP, is the province's main governmental institution responsible for the provincial government's fight against climate change. It is headed by the Ministre de l’Environnement, de la Lutte contre les changements climatiques, de la Faune et des Parcs. Its mandate covers climate action and policy, but also biodiversity conservation, national parks, hydroelectric dam safety, and many other environment-related issues.

=== Policies ===
==== Système de plafonnement et d’échange de droits d’émission de gaz à effet de serre (SPEDE) ====
The SPEDE is a Quebec-specific cap-and-trade carbon pricing scheme linked with California's as part of the Western Climate Initiative (WCI). Quebec introduced its system in 2013 and linked it to California's the next year, in 2014. Canada's federal Greenhouse Gas Pollution Pricing Act requires provinces to either use the federal carbon pricing system or create an equivalent or more stringent provincial scheme; the SPEDE formally fulfills that role.

The latter persists despite the Canadian federal government's removal of the fuel charge component of its carbon pricing scheme in 2025. According to the Quebec government, all proceeds from the SPEDE are invested in a climate change fund.

==== Plan pour une économie verte 2030 ====
The Plan pour une économie verte 2030 is the Quebec government's main roadmap for climate goals and action. It sets a goal of a 37.5% reduction of the province's GHG emissions from 1990 levels by 2030, and emphasizes electrification as a means to reach it (94% of electricity in Quebec was already produced by hydroelectric dams in 2023). However, the precise steps to reach this goal are set by the Plan de mise en oeuvre du Plan pour une économie verte 2030, "a 5-year plan reviewed annually" and "centred on three guiding pillars":

1. "Réduire les émissions de GES et accélérer la transition énergétique" (Reduce GHG emissions and accelerate the energy transition)
2. "S'adapter aux impacts des changements climatiques" (Adapt to the impacts of climate change)
3. "Soutenir la transformation de la société et de l'économie" (Support society's and the economy's transformation)

=== Agreements and memberships ===
==== Stated support for the Paris Agreement ====
In 2017, the Government of Quebec has confirmed its support for the Paris Agreement in the Assemblée nationale, Quebec's national assembly. However, as a province, it is not a signatory to the Agreement itself.

==== Western Climate Initiative ====
Quebec joined the Western Climate Initiative (WCI) in 2008, an institution that promotes and supports emissions trading in North America.

==== Under2 Coalition ====
Quebec is a member of the Under2 Coalition.

== Public mobilization ==
Several displays of public mobilization have occurred in Quebec relating to climate change, such as Fridays for Future, Marche Climat Montréal and Rage Climatique.

=== 2019 Fridays for Future march ===
In 2019, Montreal had a Fridays for Future march with the notable presence of activist Greta Thunberg, reportedly rallying over 500,000 people.
