= Demographics of the Northwest Territories =

Demographics of region

The Northwest Territories is a territory of Canada. It has an area of 1,171,918 square kilometres and a population of 41,070 as of the 2021 Canadian census.

== Population history ==
Timeline of the divisions of Canada; size of the Northwest Territories changes throughout 1870 to 1999, introducing large instant changes in its population
Note: Population drops occurred because land was ceded to other territories in Canada at times. View chart definition.

Census year	Population	5-year % change	10-year % change	Rank among provinces and territories	Notes on changes impacting area and attendant population, and count provinces and territories
1871	48,000	n/a	n/a	5	In 1870, the Rupert's Land and North-Western Territory Order, a British order in council, transfers ownership of those two areas of land from the Hudson's Bay Company to the new (1867) Dominion of Canada, becoming the North-West Territories (NWT); In 1871, Canada had 1 territory and 6 provinces
1881	56,446	n/a	17.6	7	In 1874, NWT ceded land to the expansion of the province of Ontario.; In 1876, NWT ceded land to the creation of District of Keewatin.; In 1880, NWT gained the British Arctic Territories, transferred to Canada from the United Kingdom.; In 1881, NWT ceded land to the expansion of Manitoba.; In 1881, Canada had 2 territories and 7 provinces
1891	98,967	n/a	75.3	7	In 1886, NWT gained land back from District of Keewatin.; In 1891, Canada had 2 territories and 7 provinces
1901	184,430	n/a	86.4	6	In 1895, NWT ceded land to the expansion of District of Keewatin.; In 1898, NWT ceded land to the creation of Yukon Territory and the expansion of the province of Quebec.; In 1901, Canada had 3 territories and 7 provinces
1911	6,507	n/a	-96.5	11	In 1905, NWT ceded land to the creation of the provinces of Alberta and Saskatchewan, while District of Keewatin rejoined NWT.; In 1906, North-West Territories renamed Northwest Territories (NT); In 1911, Canada had 2 territories and 9 provinces
1921	8,143	n/a	25.1	10	In 1912, NT ceded land to the expansion of the provinces of Manitoba, Ontario and Quebec.; In 1921, Canada had 2 territories and 9 provinces
1931	9,316	n/a	14.4	10	In censuses of 1931 and 1941, Canada had 2 territories and 9 provinces
1941	12,028	n/a	29.1	10	In censuses of 1931 and 1941, Canada had 2 territories and 9 provinces
1951	16,004	n/a	33.1	10	In censuses of 1951 through 1996, Canada had 2 territories and 10 provinces
1956	19,313	20.7	n/a	11	In censuses of 1951 through 1996, Canada had 2 territories and 10 provinces
1961	22,998	19.1	43.7	11	In censuses of 1951 through 1996, Canada had 2 territories and 10 provinces
1966	28,738	25.0	48.8	11	In censuses of 1951 through 1996, Canada had 2 territories and 10 provinces
1971	34,807	21.1	51.3	11	In censuses of 1951 through 1996, Canada had 2 territories and 10 provinces
1976	42,609	22.4	48.3	11	In censuses of 1951 through 1996, Canada had 2 territories and 10 provinces
1981	45,740	7.3	31.4	11	In censuses of 1951 through 1996, Canada had 2 territories and 10 provinces
1986	52,235	14.2	22.6	11	In censuses of 1951 through 1996, Canada had 2 territories and 10 provinces
1991	57,649	10.3	26.0	11	In censuses of 1951 through 1996, Canada had 2 territories and 10 provinces
1996	64,402	11.7	23.2	11	In censuses of 1951 through 1996, Canada had 2 territories and 10 provinces
2001	37,360	-42.0	-35.2	11	In 1999, NT ceded land to the creation of Nunavut.; In 2001, Canada had 3 territories and 10 provinces
2006	41,464	11.0	-35.6	11	Since 2001 census, Canada has 3 territories and 10 provinces
2011	41,462	0.0	10.9	11	Since 2001 census, Canada has 3 territories and 10 provinces
2016	41,786	0.1	0.1	11	Since 2001 census, Canada has 3 territories and 10 provinces
2021	41,070	-1.7	-0.9	11	Since 2001 census, Canada has 3 territories and 10 provinces

Source: Statistics Canada, with Social Science Federation of Canada for 1871–1901

== Population geography ==
=== Ten largest population centres ===
Ten largest municipalities by population
Municipality	2011	2006	2001	1996
Yellowknife	19,234	18,700	16,541	17,275
Hay River	3,606	3,648	3,510	3,611
Inuvik	3,463	3,484	2,894	3,296
Fort Smith	2,093	2,364	2,185	2,441
Behchokǫ̀	1,926	1,894	1,552	1,662
Fort Simpson	1,238	1,216	1,163	1,257
Tuktoyaktuk	854	870	930	943
Fort McPherson	792	776	761	878
Fort Providence	734	727	753	748
Norman Wells	727	761	666	798

== Ethnic Origins ==
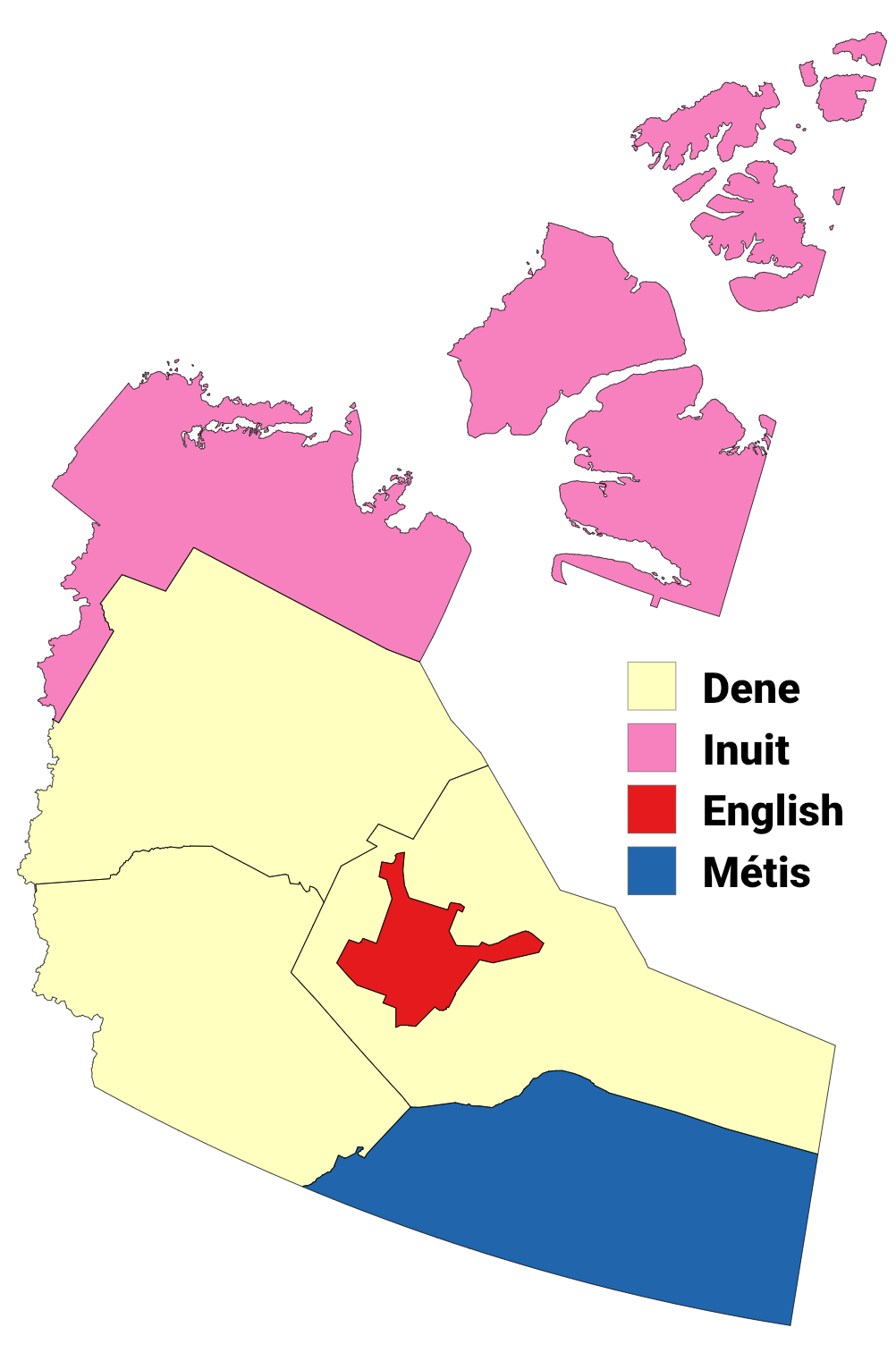
Largest ethnic origins by census division, 2021 census

== Visible minorities and Indigenous peoples ==
Indigenous identity by community, 2021

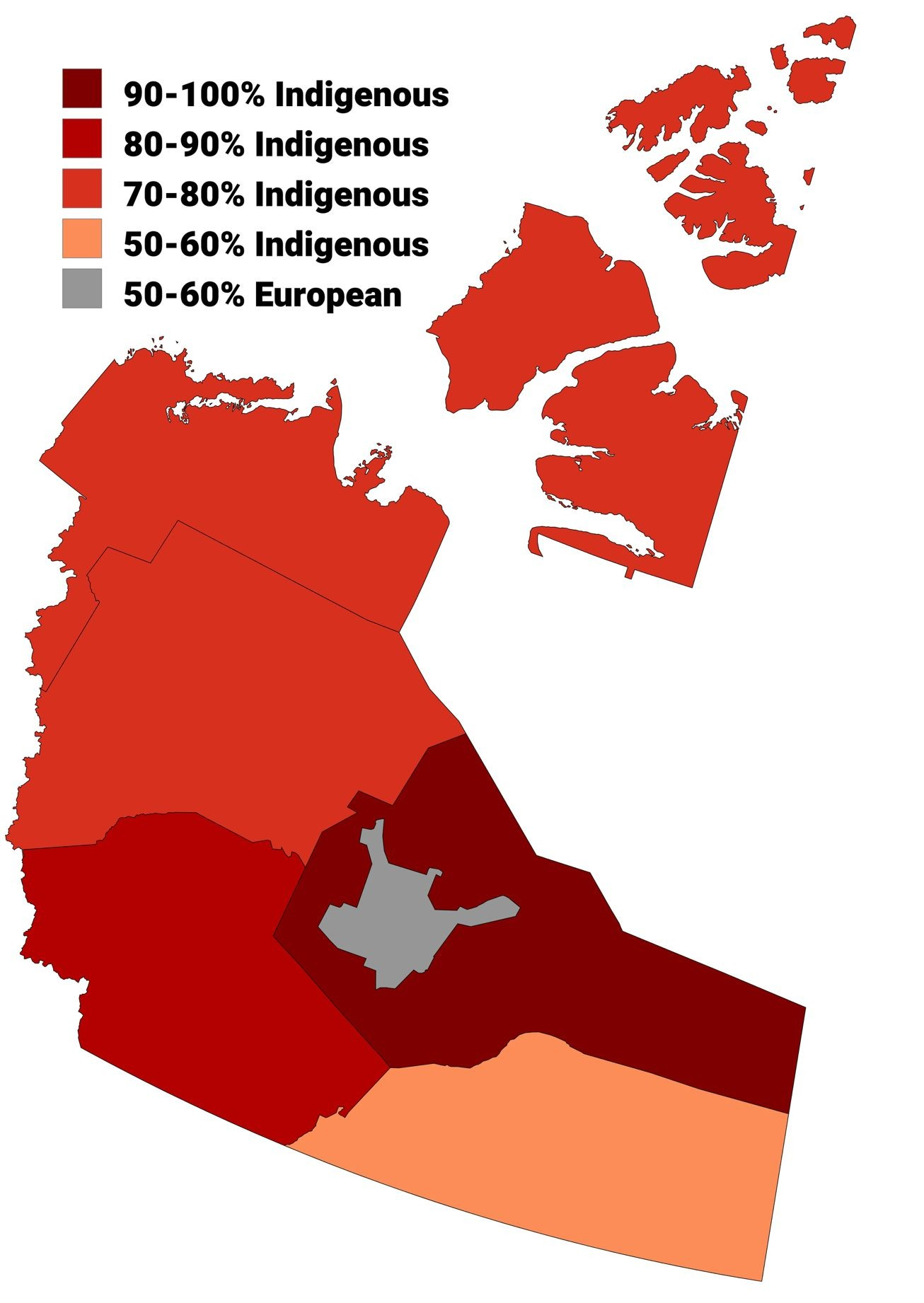
Largest panethnic groups in NWT by percentage of total population by census division, 2021 census

Visible minority & Indigenous population in Northwest Territories (1986–2021)
Group	Population	2021 census		2016 census		2011 census		2006 census		2001 census		1996 census		1991 census		1986 census	
Group	Population	Pop.	%	Pop.	%	Pop.	%	Pop.	%	Pop.	%	Pop.	%	Pop.	%	Pop.	%
Indigenous (Note: Statistics Canada defines Indigenous identity as persons who identify with the Indigenous Peoples of Canada.) group	First Nations	12,315	30.5%	13,180	32.04%	13,345	32.71%	12,640	30.79%	10,615	28.61%	11,065	17.26%	11,100 (Note: Including multiple Indigenous responses.)	19.33%	8,420	16.18%
Indigenous group	Inuk (Inuit)	4,155	10.29%	4,080	9.92%	4,335	10.63%	4,160	10.13%	3,910	10.54%	24,505	38.21%	21,355	37.18%	18,115	34.82%
Indigenous group	Métis	2,890	7.16%	3,385	8.23%	3,250	7.97%	3,580	8.72%	3,580	9.65%	3,745	5.84%	4,315	7.51%	2,965	5.7%
Indigenous group	Multiple Indigenous responses	405	1%	155	0.38%	45	0.11%	105	0.26%	180	0.49%	190	0.3%	—N/a	—N/a	995	1.91%
Indigenous group	Indigenous responses, n.i.e.	275	0.68%	55	0.13%	180	0.44%	145	0.35%	445	1.2%	—N/a	—N/a	—N/a	—N/a	—N/a	—N/a
Total Indigenous population (Note: Single responses only unless otherwise specified.)		20,035	49.62%	20,860	50.71%	21,160	51.86%	20,635	50.26%	18,730	50.48%	39,510	61.61%	35,465	61.75%	30,550	58.72%
Non-Indigenous / non-visible minority group	British Isles (Note: Including multiple responses.) (Note: 1996-present census populations for British Isles and French origins may be undercounts, due to the creation of the "Canadian" ethnic origin category. All citizens of Canada are classified as "Canadians" as defined by Canada's nationality laws. However, "Canadian" as an ethnic group has since 1996 been added to census questionnaires for possible ancestry. "Canadian" was included as an example on the English questionnaire and "Canadien" as an example on the French questionnaire. "The majority of respondents to this selection are from the eastern part of the country that was first settled. Respondents generally are visibly European (Anglophones and Francophones), however no-longer self identify with their ethnic ancestral origins. This response is attributed to a multitude or generational distance from ancestral lineage. Source 1: Jack Jedwab (April 2008). "Our 'Cense' of Self: the 2006 Census saw 1.6 million 'Canadian' Canadians Return to British and French origins" (PDF). Association for Canadian Studies. p. 2. Archived from the original (PDF) on October 2, 2011. "Virtually all persons who reported "Canadian" in 1996 had English or French as a mother tongue, were born in Canada and had both parents born inside Canada. This suggests that many of these respondents were people whose families have been in this country for several generations. In effect the "new Canadians" were persons that previously reported either British or French origins. Moreover in 1996 some 55% of people with both parents born in Canada reported Canadian (alone or in combination with other origins). By contrast, only 4% of people with both parents born outside Canada reported Canadian. Thus the Canadian response did not appeal widely to either immigrants or their children. Most important however was that nearly half of those persons reporting Canadian origin in 1996 were in Quebec this represented a majority of the mother tongue francophone population[...]In the 2001 Census, 11.7 million people, or 39% of the total population, reported Canadian as their ethnic origin, either alone or in combination with other origins. Some 4.9 million Quebecers out of 7.1 million individuals reported Canadian or "Canadien" thus accounting for nearly seven in ten persons (nearly eighty percent of francophones in Quebec)." Source 2: Don Kerr (2007). The Changing Face of Canada: Essential Readings in Population. Canadian Scholars' Press. pp. 313–317. ISBN 978-1-55130-322-2. Source 3: Jantzen (2006) Footnote 5: Note that Canadian and Canadien have been separated since the two terms mean different things. In English, it usually means someone whose family has been in Canada for multiple generations. In French it is referring to "Les Habitants", settlers of New France during the 17th and 18th centuries who earned their living primarily from agricultural labour. Source 4: Jantzen (2006): The reporting of French New World ancestries (Canadien, Québécois, and French-Canadian) is concentrated in the 4th+ generations; 79% of French-Canadian, 88% of Canadien and 90% of Québécois are in the 4th+generations category. Source 5: Jantzen (2005): According to Table 3, the 4th+ generations are highest because of a strong sense of belonging to their ethnic or cultural group among those respondents reporting the New World ancestries of Canadien and Québécois. Source 6: Jantzen (2006): For respondents of French and New World ancestries the pattern is different. Where generational data is available, it is possible to see that not all respondents reporting these ancestries report a high sense of belonging to their ethnic or cultural group. The high proportions are focused among those respondents that are in the 4th+ generations, and unlike with the British Isles example, the difference between the 2nd and 3rd generations to the 4th+ generation is more pronounced. Since these ancestries are concentrated in the 4th+ generations, their high proportions of sense of belonging to ethnic or cultural group push up the 4th+ generational results.)	11,430	28.31%	12,815	31.15%	12,530	30.71%	13,200	32.15%	11,540	31.1%	16,505	25.74%	17,995	31.33%	16,735	32.17%
Non-Indigenous / non-visible minority group	French	4,090	10.13%	4,510	10.96%	4,095	10.04%	4,405	10.73%	3,925	10.58%	5,445	8.49%	5,560	9.68%	5,040	9.69%
Non-Indigenous / non-visible minority group	Western European	4,010	9.93%	4,480	10.89%	4,185	10.26%	4,495	10.95%	3,850	10.38%	5,140	8.02%	5,480	9.54%	4,325	8.31%
Non-Indigenous / non-visible minority group	Eastern European	2,230	5.52%	2,865	6.96%	2,600	6.37%	2,840	6.92%	2,435	6.56%	3,195	4.98%	3,080	5.36%	2,320	4.46%
Non-Indigenous / non-visible minority group	Northern European	1,680	4.16%	1,720	4.18%	1,615	3.96%	1,865	4.54%	1,420	3.83%	2,040	3.18%	1,775	3.09%	1,280	2.46%
Non-Indigenous / non-visible minority group	Southern European	1,105	2.74%	1,215	2.95%	1,135	2.78%	1,145	2.79%	870	2.34%	1,070	1.67%	940	1.64%	900	1.73%
Non-Indigenous / non-visible minority group	European, n.i.e. & n.o.s.	770	1.91%	255	0.62%	515	1.26%	175	0.43%	115	0.31%	205	0.32%	155	0.27%	110	0.21%
Total non-Indigenous / non-visible minority population		15,425	38.2%	16,320	39.67%	16,915	41.46%	18,155	44.22%	16,830	45.36%	22,945	35.78%	20,495	35.69%	20,380	39.17%
Visible minority (Note: Statistics Canada defines visible minorities as defined in the Employment Equity Act which defines visible minorities as "persons, other than Aboriginal peoples, who are non-Caucasian in race or non-white in colour".) group	Filipino	1,665	4.12%	1,300	3.16%	900	2.21%	690	1.68%	465	1.25%	430	0.67%	250	0.44%	200	0.38%
Visible minority group	Black	1,060	2.63%	760	1.85%	555	1.36%	375	0.91%	170	0.46%	225	0.35%	275	0.48%	210	0.4%
Visible minority group	South Asian	775	1.92%	615	1.5%	185	0.45%	210	0.51%	190	0.51%	245	0.38%	215	0.37%	100	0.19%
Visible minority group	Chinese	335	0.83%	305	0.74%	380	0.93%	315	0.77%	255	0.69%	330	0.51%	355	0.62%	260	0.5%
Visible minority group	Southeast Asian	305	0.76%	255	0.62%	225	0.55%	355	0.86%	190	0.51%	200	0.31%	110	0.19%	195	0.37%
Visible minority group	Arab	230	0.57%	105	0.26%	110	0.27%	90	0.22%	85	0.23%	—N/a	—N/a	—N/a	—N/a	—N/a	—N/a
Visible minority group	Multiple visible minorities	170	0.42%	90	0.22%	30	0.07%	40	0.1%	35	0.09%	30	0.05%	40	0.07%	10	0.02%
Visible minority group	Latin American	125	0.31%	135	0.33%	105	0.26%	85	0.21%	55	0.15%	45	0.07%	35	0.06%	30	0.06%
Visible minority group	Japanese	105	0.26%	145	0.35%	45	0.11%	15	0.04%	40	0.11%	40	0.06%	60	0.1%	50	0.1%
Visible minority group	Korean	75	0.19%	105	0.26%	45	0.11%	15	0.04%	20	0.05%	15	0.02%	20	0.03%	20	0.04%
Visible minority group	Visible minority, n.i.e.	45	0.11%	95	0.23%	75	0.18%	30	0.07%	20	0.05%	15	0.02%	15	0.03%	10	0.02%
Visible minority group	West Asian	35	0.09%	50	0.12%	65	0.16%	40	0.1%	20	0.05%	—N/a	—N/a	—N/a	—N/a	—N/a	—N/a
Visible minority group	Arab/West Asian	—N/a	—N/a	—N/a	—N/a	—N/a	—N/a	—N/a	—N/a	—N/a	—N/a	110	0.17%	100	0.17%	30	0.06%
Total visible minority population		4,920	12.18%	3,955	9.61%	2,725	6.68%	2,265	5.52%	1,545	4.16%	1,670	2.6%	1,470	2.56%	1,095	2.1%
Total responses		40,380	98.32%	41,135	98.44%	40,800	98.4%	41,055	99.01%	37,105	99.32%	64,125	99.57%	57,430	99.62%	52,025	99.6%
Total population		41,070	100%	41,786	100%	41,462	100%	41,464	100%	37,360	100%	64,402	100%	57,649	100%	52,235	100%

== Languages ==
French was made an official language in 1877 by the appointed government, after lengthy and bitter debate resulting from a speech from the throne in 1888 by Lt. Governor Joseph Royal. The members voted on more than one occasion to nullify and make English the only language used in the assembly. After some conflict with Ottawa and a decisive vote on January 19, 1892, the issue was put to rest as an English-only territory.

In the early 1980s, the government of Northwest Territories was again under pressure by the federal government to reintroduce French as an official language. Some native members walked out of the assembly, protesting that they would not be permitted to speak their own language. The executive council appointed a special committee of MLAs to study the matter. They decided that if French was to be an official language, then so must the other languages in the territories.

The Northwest Territories's Official Languages Act recognizes the following eleven official languages, which is more than any other political division in Canada:

- Chipewyan
- Cree
- English
- French
- Gwich’in
- Inuinnaqtun
- Inuktitut
- Inuvialuktun
- North Slavey
- South Slavey
- Tłįchǫ

NWT residents have a right to use any of the above languages in a territorial court and in debates and proceedings of the legislature. However, laws are legally binding only in their French and English versions, and the government only publishes laws and other documents in the territory's other official languages when the legislature asks it to. Furthermore, access to services in any language is limited to institutions and circumstances where there is significant demand for that language or where it is reasonable to expect it given the nature of the services requested. In reality, this means that English language services are universally available and there is no guarantee that other languages, including French, will be used by any particular government service except for the courts.

The 2006 Canadian census showed a population of 41,464. Of the 40,680 singular responses to the census question concerning 'mother tongue' the most commonly reported languages (official languages in bold) were:

	Mother tongue	Speakers	Share
1.	**English**	31,545	77.54%
2.	Athapaskan languages	4,710	11.58%
	**Dogrib**	1,950	4.79%
	**South Slavey**	1,285	3.16%
	**North Slavey**	835	2.05%
	**Chipewyan**	390	0.96%
	**Gwich'in**	190	0.47%
	Dene	50	0.12%
3.	**French**	975	2.40%
4.	**Inuktitut**	695	1.71%
5.	Malayo-Polynesian languages	530	1.30%
	Tagalog	505	1.24%
6.	Vietnamese	305	0.75%
7.	Chinese	260	0.64%
	Cantonese	120	0.29%
8.	Algonquian languages	250	0.61%
	**Cree**	190	0.47%
	Ojibway	35	0.09%
9.	German	190	0.47%
10=	Arabic	105	0.26%
10=	Creole	105	0.26%
12.	Dutch	95	0.23%
13.	Spanish	90	0.22%
14.	Niger-Congo languages	80	0.20%
	Bantu languages	55	0.14%
15.	Yugoslavian languages	60	0.15%
16=	**Inuinnaqtun**	55	0.14%
16=	Italian	55	0.14%

There were also about 40 single-language responses for Ukrainian; 35 for the Scandinavian languages, Slovak and Urdu; and 30 for Hungarian, the Iranian languages and Polish. In addition, there were also 320 responses of both English and a 'non-official language'; 15 of both French and a 'non-official language; 45 of both English and French, and about 400 people who either did not respond to the question, or reported multiple non-official languages, or else gave some other unenumerated response. The Northwest Territories' official languages are shown in bold. Figures shown are for the number of single language responses and the percentage of total single-language responses.)

== Religion ==
Religious groups in Northwest Territories (1981−2021)
Religious group	2021 Canadian census		2011 Canadian census		2001 Canadian census		1991 Canadian census		1981 Canadian census	
Religious group	Pop.	%	Pop.	%	Pop.	%	Pop.	%	Pop.	%
Christianity	22,275	55.16%	27,050	66.3%	29,645	79.89%	50,755	88.38%	42,185	92.63%
Irreligion	16,070	39.8%	12,450	30.51%	6,600	17.79%	6,020	10.48%	2,960	6.5%
Islam	730	1.81%	275	0.67%	175	0.47%	55	0.1%	30	0.07%
Indigenous spirituality	330	0.82%	500	1.23%	235	0.63%	55	0.1%	45	0.1%
Buddhism	250	0.62%	170	0.42%	155	0.42%	75	0.13%	50	0.11%
Hinduism	200	0.5%	70	0.17%	70	0.19%	70	0.12%	20	0.04%
Sikhism	110	0.27%	20	0.05%	45	0.12%	65	0.11%	10	0.02%
Judaism	50	0.12%	40	0.1%	30	0.08%	60	0.1%	70	0.15%
Other	370	0.92%	220	0.54%	135	0.36%	280	0.49%	170	0.37%
Total responses	40,380	98.32%	40,800	98.4%	37,105	99.32%	57,430	99.62%	45,540	99.56%
Total population	41,070	100%	41,462	100%	37,360	100%	57,649	100%	45,741	100%

== Migration ==
=== Immigration ===
Northwest Territories immigration
Year	Immigrant percentage	Immigrant population	Total population
1881	0.8%	453	56,446
1891	18.9%	18,712	98,967
1901	0.7%	147	20,129
1911	1.8%	116	6,507
1921	2.5%	207	8,143
1931	5.7%	534	9,316
1941	6.8%	818	12,028
1951	6.5%	1,042	16,004
1961	8.5%	1,963	22,998
1971	6.5%	2,245	34,805

The 2021 census reported that immigrants (individuals born outside Canada) comprise 4,145 persons or 10.3 percent of the total population of the Northwest Territories.

Immigrants in Northwest Territories by country of birth
Country of birth	2021 census		2016 census		2011 census		2006 census		2001 census		1996 census		1991 census		1986 census		1981 census		1971 census		1961 census		1951 census		1941 census	
Country of birth	Pop.	%	Pop.	%	Pop.	%	Pop.	%	Pop.	%	Pop.	%	Pop.	%	Pop.	%	Pop.	%	Pop.	%	Pop.	%	Pop.	%	Pop.	%
Philippines	1,175	28.3%	955	25.9%	630	21.9%	555	19.8%	355	14.9%	320	10.4%	170	6.1%	120	4.2%	95	3.4%	—N/a	—N/a	—N/a	—N/a	—N/a	—N/a	—N/a	—N/a
United Kingdom	275	6.6%	320	8.7%	280	9.7%	340	12.1%	460	19.3%	690	22.4%	715	25.6%	780	27.5%	820	29.4%	740	33%	537	27.4%	308	29.6%	222	27.1%
India	265	6.4%	180	4.9%	70	2.4%	30	1.1%	55	2.3%	75	2.4%	85	3%	25	0.9%	40	1.4%	30	1.3%	14	0.7%	3	0.3%	2	0.2%
United States	175	4.2%	220	6%	225	7.8%	235	8.4%	215	9%	320	10.4%	305	10.9%	290	10.2%	385	13.8%	270	12%	300	15.3%	248	23.8%	168	20.5%
Vietnam	165	4%	175	4.7%	95	3.3%	245	8.7%	140	5.9%	150	4.9%	95	3.4%	150	5.3%	40	1.4%	—N/a	—N/a	—N/a	—N/a	—N/a	—N/a	—N/a	—N/a
Germany & Austria	125 (Note: Germany: 115 / Austria: 10)	3%	135 (Note: Germany: 125 / Austria: 10)	3.7%	120 (Note: Germany: 110 / Austria: 10)	4.2%	130 (Note: Germany: 130 / Austria: 0)	4.6%	155 (Note: Germany: 145 / Austria: 10)	6.5%	220 (Note: Germany: 205 / Austria: 15)	7.2%	215 (Note: Germany: 200 / Austria: 15)	7.7%	305 (Note: Germany: 285 / Austria: 20)	10.8%	270 (Note: Germany: 250 / Austria: 20)	9.7%	240	10.7%	306	15.6%	35	3.4%	30	3.7%
China & Taiwan	110 (Note: China: 100 / Taiwan: 10)	2.7%	120 (Note: China: 110 / Taiwan: 10)	3.3%	170 (Note: China: POP / Taiwan: 0)	5.9%	100 (Note: China: POP / Taiwan: 0)	3.6%	60 (Note: China: POP / Taiwan: 0)	2.5%	75 (Note: China: POP / Taiwan: 0)	2.4%	65 (Note: China: POP / Taiwan: 0)	2.3%	70 (Note: China: POP / Taiwan: 0)	2.5%	70 (Note: China: 35 / Taiwan: 35)	2.5%	55	2.4%	16	0.8%	4	0.4%	3	0.4%
Eritrea & Ethiopia	90 (Note: Eritrea: 50 / Ethiopia: 40)	2.2%	50 (Note: Eritrea: 20 / Ethiopia: 30)	1.4%	40 (Note: Eritrea: 40 / Ethiopia: 0)	1.4%	15 (Note: Eritrea: 0 / Ethiopia: 15)	0.5%	10 (Note: Eritrea: 0 / Ethiopia: 10)	0.4%	0	0%	0	0%	0	0%	0	0%	—N/a	—N/a	—N/a	—N/a	—N/a	—N/a	—N/a	—N/a
South Africa	90	2.2%	40	1.1%	35	1.2%	40	1.4%	50	2.1%	45	1.5%	55	2%	75	2.6%	15	0.5%	—N/a	—N/a	8	0.4%	2	0.2%	1	0.1%
Sudan & South Sudan	85	2.1%	80	2.2%	80	2.8%	10	0.4%	10	0.4%	10	0.3%	0	0%	0	0%	0	0%	—N/a	—N/a	—N/a	—N/a	—N/a	—N/a	—N/a	—N/a
Zimbabwe	80	1.9%	70	1.9%	145	5%	10	0.4%	10	0.4%	10	0.3%	15	0.5%	5	0.2%	5	0.2%	—N/a	—N/a	—N/a	—N/a	—N/a	—N/a	—N/a	—N/a
Bangladesh	80	1.9%	95	2.6%	0	0%	10	0.4%	0	0%	0	0%	0	0%	0	0%	0	0%	—N/a	—N/a	—N/a	—N/a	—N/a	—N/a	—N/a	—N/a
Pakistan	75	1.8%	70	1.9%	15	0.5%	40	1.4%	10	0.4%	10	0.3%	10	0.4%	5	0.2%	0	0%	5	0.2%	—N/a	—N/a	—N/a	—N/a	—N/a	—N/a
Nigeria & Ghana	75 (Note: Nigeria: 55 / Ghana: 20)	1.8%	65 (Note: Nigeria: 35 / Ghana: 30)	1.8%	20 (Note: Nigeria: 10 / Ghana: 10)	0.7%	135 (Note: Nigeria: 30 / Ghana: 105)	4.8%	10 (Note: Nigeria: 0 / Ghana: 10)	0.4%	20 (Note: Nigeria: 10 / Ghana: 10)	0.7%	10	0.4%	0	0%	0	0%	—N/a	—N/a	—N/a	—N/a	—N/a	—N/a	—N/a	—N/a
Australia & New Zealand	75	1.8%	35	0.9%	20	0.7%	50	1.8%	50	2.1%	50	1.6%	45	1.6%	40	1.4%	50	1.8%	60	2.7%	23	1.2%	4	0.4%	8	1%
Somalia	65	1.6%	25	0.7%	10	0.3%	20	0.7%	10	0.4%	25	0.8%	0	0%	0	0%	0	0%	—N/a	—N/a	—N/a	—N/a	—N/a	—N/a	—N/a	—N/a
Jamaica & Trinidad and Tobago	60 (Note: Jamaica: 60 / Trinidad and Tobago: 0)	1.4%	85 (Note: Jamaica: 75 / Trinidad and Tobago: 10)	2.3%	40 (Note: Jamaica: 40 / Trinidad and Tobago: 0)	1.4%	35 (Note: Jamaica: 20 / Trinidad and Tobago: 15)	1.2%	45 (Note: Jamaica: 35 / Trinidad and Tobago: 10)	1.9%	45 (Note: Jamaica: 30 / Trinidad and Tobago: 15)	1.5%	55 (Note: Jamaica: 30 / Trinidad and Tobago: 25)	2%	55 (Note: Jamaica: 25 / Trinidad and Tobago: 30)	1.9%	20	0.7%	20	0.9%	7 (Note: All individuals born in the British West Indies.)	0.4%	1	0.1%	5	0.6%
France & Belgium	60 (Note: France: 50 / Belgium: 10)	1.4%	45 (Note: France: 35 / Belgium: 10)	1.2%	35 (Note: France: 35 / Belgium: 0)	1.2%	55 (Note: France: 45 / Belgium: 10)	2%	45 (Note: France: 35 / Belgium: 10)	1.9%	45 (Note: France: 45 / Belgium: 0)	1.5%	55 (Note: France: 45 / Belgium: 10)	2%	65 (Note: France: 50 / Belgium: 15)	2.3%	80 (Note: France: 60 / Belgium: 20)	2.9%	75	3.3%	76	3.9%	59	5.7%	62	7.6%
Kenya & Tanzania & Uganda	60 (Note: Kenya: 0 / Tanzania: 15 / Uganda: 45)	1.4%	35 (Note: Kenya: 10 / Tanzania: 0 / Uganda: 25)	0.9%	40 (Note: Kenya: 15 / Tanzania: 10 / Uganda: 15)	1.4%	20 (Note: Kenya: 0 / Tanzania: 10 / Uganda: 10)	0.7%	20 (Note: Kenya: 10 / Tanzania: 10 / Uganda: 0)	0.8%	40 (Note: Kenya: 20 / Tanzania: 10 / Uganda: 10)	1.3%	10 (Note: Kenya: 10 / Tanzania: 0 / Uganda: 0)	0.4%	0	0%	5	0.2%	—N/a	—N/a	—N/a	—N/a	—N/a	—N/a	—N/a	—N/a
Syria & Lebanon	50 (Note: Syria: 40 / Lebanon: 10)	1.2%	10 (Note: Syria: 10 / Lebanon: 0)	0.3%	20 (Note: Syria: 0 / Lebanon: 20)	0.7%	30 (Note: Syria: 0 / Lebanon: 30)	1.1%	35 (Note: Syria: 10 / Lebanon: 25)	1.5%	30 (Note: Syria: 10 / Lebanon: 20)	1%	0	0%	0	0%	5	0.2%	—N/a	—N/a	—N/a	—N/a	—N/a	—N/a	3	0.4%
Algeria & Tunisia	50 (Note: Algeria: 35 / Tunisia: 15)	1.2%	10 (Note: Algeria: 10 / Tunisia: 0)	0.3%	15 (Note: Algeria: 15 / Tunisia: 0)	0.5%	0	0%	10 (Note: Algeria: 10 / Tunisia: 0)	0.4%	10 (Note: Algeria: 10 / Tunisia: 0)	0.3%	0	0%	0	0%	0	0%	—N/a	—N/a	—N/a	—N/a	—N/a	—N/a	—N/a	—N/a
Hong Kong	45	1.1%	35	0.9%	20	0.7%	60	2.1%	50	2.1%	75	2.4%	65	2.3%	35	1.2%	45	1.6%	—N/a	—N/a	—N/a	—N/a	—N/a	—N/a	—N/a	—N/a
South Korea	45	1.1%	75	2%	10	0.3%	10	0.4%	15	0.6%	10	0.3%	10	0.4%	20	0.7%	0	0%	—N/a	—N/a	—N/a	—N/a	—N/a	—N/a	—N/a	—N/a
Armenia	45	1.1%	20	0.5%	70	2.4%	0	0%	10	0.4%	0	0%	—N/a	—N/a	—N/a	—N/a	—N/a	—N/a	—N/a	—N/a	—N/a	—N/a	—N/a	—N/a	—N/a	—N/a
Morocco	40	1%	25	0.7%	0	0%	0	0%	10	0.4%	15	0.5%	0	0%	0	0%	0	0%	—N/a	—N/a	—N/a	—N/a	—N/a	—N/a	—N/a	—N/a
Italy	35	0.8%	40	1.1%	25	0.9%	45	1.6%	35	1.5%	55	1.8%	70	2.5%	130	4.6%	110	3.9%	125	5.6%	93	4.7%	5	0.5%	4	0.5%
Netherlands	35	0.8%	35	0.9%	25	0.9%	65	2.3%	65	2.7%	100	3.3%	95	3.4%	80	2.8%	110	3.9%	75	3.3%	36	1.8%	14	1.3%	8	1%
Japan	35	0.8%	70	1.9%	20	0.7%	10	0.4%	10	0.4%	10	0.3%	10	0.4%	5	0.2%	0	0%	5	0.2%	4	0.2%	1	0.1%	1	0.1%
Sierra Leone	30	0.7%	10	0.3%	20	0.7%	0	0%	0	0%	10	0.3%	—N/a	—N/a	—N/a	—N/a	—N/a	—N/a	—N/a	—N/a	—N/a	—N/a	—N/a	—N/a	—N/a	—N/a
El Salvador & Guatemala & Nicaragua	25 (Note: El Salvador: 15 / Guatemala: 0 / Nicaragua: 10)	0.6%	35 (Note: El Salvador: 25 / Guatemala: 0 / Nicaragua: 10)	0.9%	15 (Note: El Salvador: 15 / Guatemala: 0 / Nicaragua: 0)	0.5%	15 (Note: El Salvador: 15 / Guatemala: 0 / Nicaragua: 0)	0.5%	30 (Note: El Salvador: 10 / Guatemala: 10 / Nicaragua: 10)	1.3%	30 (Note: El Salvador: 10 / Guatemala: 10 / Nicaragua: 10)	1%	0	0%	0	0%	0	0%	—N/a	—N/a	—N/a	—N/a	—N/a	—N/a	—N/a	—N/a
Namibia	25	0.6%	25	0.7%	0	0%	0	0%	0	0%	0	0%	—N/a	—N/a	—N/a	—N/a	—N/a	—N/a	—N/a	—N/a	—N/a	—N/a	—N/a	—N/a	—N/a	—N/a
Malaysia & Singapore	25 (Note: Malaysia: 15 / Singapore: 10)	0.6%	20 (Note: Malaysia: 10 / Singapore: 10)	0.5%	15 (Note: Malaysia: 15 / Singapore: 0)	0.5%	10 (Note: Malaysia: 10 / Singapore: 0)	0.4%	20 (Note: Malaysia: 10 / Singapore: 10)	0.8%	30 (Note: Malaysia: 20 / Singapore: 10)	1%	25 (Note: Malaysia: 15 / Singapore: 10)	0.9%	15 (Note: Malaysia: 15 / Singapore: 0)	0.5%	—N/a	—N/a	—N/a	—N/a	—N/a	—N/a	—N/a	—N/a	—N/a	—N/a
Mexico	25	0.6%	20	0.5%	15	0.5%	10	0.4%	10	0.4%	10	0.3%	10	0.4%	0	0%	5	0.2%	—N/a	—N/a	—N/a	—N/a	—N/a	—N/a	—N/a	—N/a
Ireland	25	0.6%	20	0.5%	15	0.5%	25	0.9%	25	1.1%	45	1.5%	40	1.4%	45	1.6%	25	0.9%	50	2.2%	95	4.8%	43	4.1%	27	3.3%
Hungary	25	0.6%	10	0.3%	20	0.7%	15	0.5%	20	0.8%	30	1%	45	1.6%	15	0.5%	45	1.6%	35	1.6%	34	1.7%	4	0.4%	2	0.2%
Romania	25	0.6%	10	0.3%	20	0.7%	10	0.4%	10	0.4%	10	0.3%	0	0%	0	0%	10	0.4%	5	0.2%	4	0.2%	4	0.4%	4	0.5%
Czech Republic & Slovakia	20	0.5%	50	1.4%	40	1.4%	55	2%	45	1.9%	50	1.6%	50	1.8%	40	1.4%	25	0.9%	35	1.6%	22	1.1%	15	1.4%	2	0.2%
Iran	20	0.5%	35	0.9%	15	0.5%	20	0.7%	10	0.4%	15	0.5%	15	0.5%	5	0.2%	5	0.2%	—N/a	—N/a	—N/a	—N/a	—N/a	—N/a	—N/a	—N/a
Poland	20	0.5%	20	0.5%	25	0.9%	15	0.5%	35	1.5%	55	1.8%	55	2%	45	1.6%	65	2.3%	45	2%	57	2.9%	75	7.2%	19	2.3%
Russia & Ukraine	20 (Note: Russia: 20 / Ukraine: 0)	0.5%	15 (Note: Russia: 15 / Ukraine: 0)	0.4%	45 (Note: Russia: 30 / Ukraine: 15)	1.6%	20 (Note: Russia: 10 / Ukraine: 10)	0.7%	25 (Note: Russia: 15 / Ukraine: 10)	1.1%	25 (Note: Includes total persons born in all republics of the Soviet Union.)	0.8%	25	0.9%	10	0.4%	30	1.1%	35	1.6%	49	2.5%	36	3.5%	19	2.3%
Bulgaria	20	0.5%	10	0.3%	10	0.3%	15	0.5%	10	0.4%	15	0.5%	10	0.4%	0	0%	—N/a	—N/a	—N/a	—N/a	—N/a	—N/a	—N/a	—N/a	0	0%
Scandinavia (Note: Includes Denmark, Finland, Iceland, Norway and Sweden.)	15	0.4%	20	0.5%	25	0.9%	45	1.6%	45	1.9%	65	2.1%	75	2.7%	85	3%	100	3.6%	100	4.5%	153	7.8%	150	14.4%	176	21.5%
Colombia	15	0.4%	15	0.4%	10	0.3%	20	0.7%	10	0.4%	10	0.3%	10	0.4%	0	0%	—N/a	—N/a	—N/a	—N/a	—N/a	—N/a	—N/a	—N/a	—N/a	—N/a
Former Yugoslavia	10	0.2%	40	1.1%	40	1.4%	55	2%	70	2.9%	70	2.3%	55	2%	50	1.8%	65	2.3%	75	3.3%	38	1.9%	19	1.8%	3	0.4%
Sri Lanka	10	0.2%	15	0.4%	10	0.3%	10	0.4%	10	0.4%	20	0.7%	15	0.5%	5	0.2%	0	0%	—N/a	—N/a	—N/a	—N/a	—N/a	—N/a	—N/a	—N/a
Brazil	10	0.2%	15	0.4%	10	0.3%	0	0%	10	0.4%	10	0.3%	10	0.4%	0	0%	0	0%	—N/a	—N/a	—N/a	—N/a	—N/a	—N/a	—N/a	—N/a
Guyana	10	0.2%	10	0.3%	10	0.3%	20	0.7%	10	0.4%	0	0%	15	0.5%	30	1.1%	5	0.2%	—N/a	—N/a	—N/a	—N/a	—N/a	—N/a	—N/a	—N/a
Grenada	10	0.2%	10	0.3%	10	0.3%	10	0.4%	0	0%	0	0%	—N/a	—N/a	—N/a	—N/a	—N/a	—N/a	—N/a	—N/a	—N/a	—N/a	—N/a	—N/a	—N/a	—N/a
Venezuela	10	0.2%	10	0.3%	0	0%	0	0%	0	0%	0	0%	—N/a	—N/a	—N/a	—N/a	—N/a	—N/a	—N/a	—N/a	—N/a	—N/a	—N/a	—N/a	—N/a	—N/a
Portugal	10	0.2%	0	0%	0	0%	0	0%	10	0.4%	15	0.5%	10	0.4%	25	0.9%	30	1.1%	10	0.4%	—N/a	—N/a	—N/a	—N/a	—N/a	—N/a
Spain	10	0.2%	0	0%	0	0%	10	0.4%	10	0.4%	0	0%	10	0.4%	10	0.4%	5	0.2%	5	0.2%	—N/a	—N/a	—N/a	—N/a	0	0%
Cameroon & DR Congo	10 (Note: Cameroon: 10 / DR Congo: 0)	0.2%	0	0%	0	0%	0	0%	10 (Note: Cameroon: 0 / DR Congo: 10)	0.4%	10	0.3%	0	0%	0	0%	0	0%	—N/a	—N/a	—N/a	—N/a	—N/a	—N/a	—N/a	—N/a
Total immigrants	4,145	10.3%	3,685	9%	2,880	7.1%	2,810	6.8%	2,380	6.4%	3,075	4.8%	2,795	4.9%	2,835	5.4%	2,785	6.1%	2,245	6.5%	1,963	8.5%	1,042	6.5%	818	6.8%
Total responses	40,375	98.3%	41,135	98.4%	40,800	98.4%	41,060	99%	37,100	99.3%	64,120	99.6%	57,430	99.6%	52,020	99.6%	45,540	99.6%	34,805	100%	22,998	100%	16,004	100%	12,028	100%
Total population	41,070	100%	41,786	100%	41,462	100%	41,464	100%	37,360	100%	64,402	100%	57,649	100%	52,238	100%	45,741	100%	34,807	100%	22,998	100%	16,004	100%	12,028	100%

=== Recent immigration ===
The 2021 Canadian census counted a total of 810 people who immigrated to the Northwest Territories between 2016 and 2021.

Recent immigrants to Northwest Territories by country of birth (2016 to 2021)
Country of birth	Population	% recent immigrants
Philippines	275	34%
India	95	11.7%
Sudan	35	4.3%
Syria	35	4.3%
South Africa	25	3.1%
France	25	3.1%
China	20	2.5%
Zimbabwe	20	2.5%
Bangladesh	20	2.5%
Pakistan	20	2.5%
Jamaica	20	2.5%
Somalia	20	2.5%
Eritrea	20	2.5%
Ethiopia	20	2.5%
Netherlands	15	1.9%
United Kingdom	15	1.9%
Argentina	10	1.2%
Portugal	10	1.2%
Nigeria	10	1.2%
Uganda	10	1.2%
Egypt	10	1.2%
Namibia	10	1.2%
Vietnam	10	1.2%
Total recent immigrants	810	100%

=== Internal migration ===
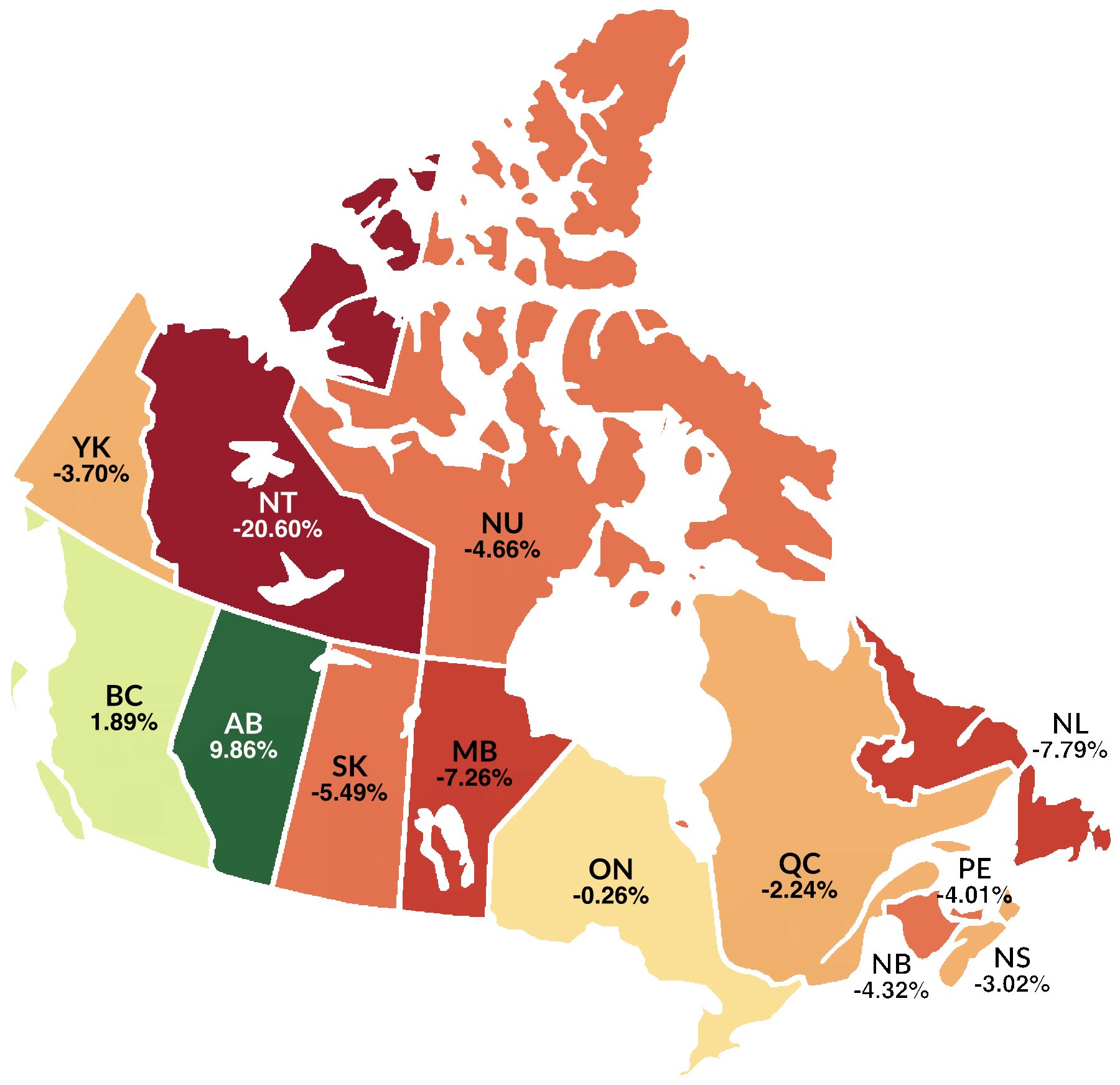
Net cumulative interprovincial migration per Province from 1997 to 2017, as a share of population of each Provinces

A total of 12,100 people moved to the Northwest Territories from other parts of Canada between 1996 and 2006 while 15,955 people moved in the opposite direction. These movements resulted in a net influx of 825 from Newfoundland and Labrador, 295 from Nunavut, 235 from Quebec and 195 from Nova Scotia; and a net outmigration of 3,955 to Alberta, 705 to British Columbia, 260 to Manitoba, 245 to Ontario and 230 to the Yukon. (All inter-provincial movements and official minority movements of more than 100 persons are given.)

== See also ==
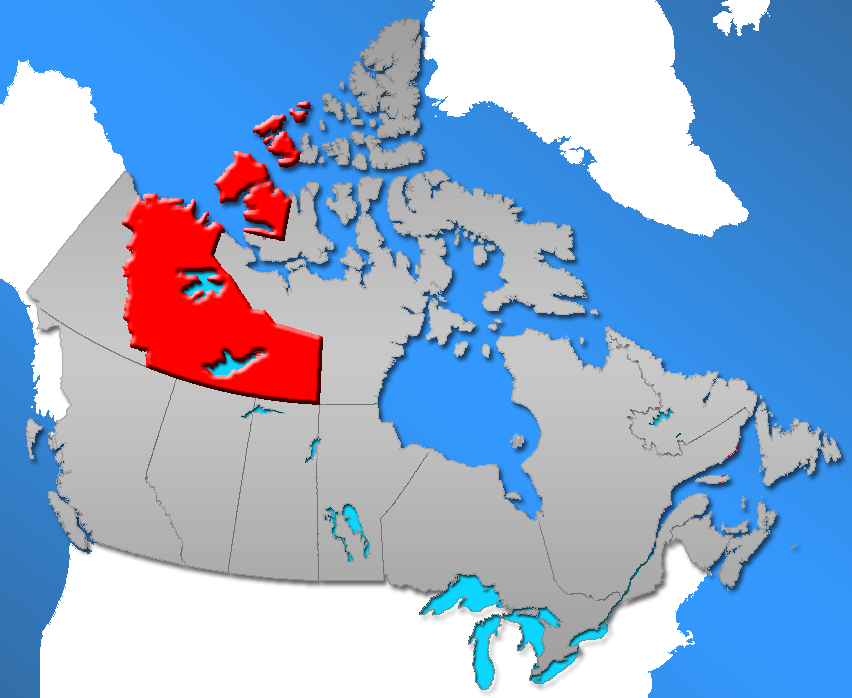
Demographics of Canada's provinces and territories
- Demographics of Canada
- Population of Canada by province and territory
