= Climate change in Alberta =

Climate change in Alberta affects various environments and industries, including agriculture.

== Greenhouse gas emissions ==
As of 2008, Alberta's electricity sector was the most carbon-intensive of all Canadian provinces and territories, with total emissions of 55.9 million tonnes of CO_{2} equivalent in 2008, accounting for 47% of all Canadian emissions in the electricity and heat generation sector.

In November 2015, Premier Rachel Notley unveiled plans to increase the province's carbon tax to $20 per tonne in 2017, increasing further to $30 per tonne by 2018. This policy shift came about partly because of the rejection of the Keystone XL pipeline, which the premier likened to a "kick in the teeth". The province's new climate policies also include phasing out coal-fired power plants by 2030, and cutting emissions of methane by 45% by 2025.

== Impacts of climate change ==
=== Water supply ===
The water supply will be reduced due to reduced snowpack in the mountains.

== Response ==
Alberta has an established "Climate Change Action Plan", released in 2008. The Specified Gas Emitters Regulation in Alberta made it the first jurisdiction in North America to have a price on carbon in 2007. and was renewed to 2017 with increased stringency. It requires "large final emitters", defined as facilities emitting more than 100,000 t CO_{2}eq per year, to comply with an emission intensity reduction which increases over time and caps at 12% in 2015, 15% in 2016 and 20% in 2017. Facilities have several options for compliance. They may actually make reductions, pay into the Climate Change and Emission Management Fund (CCEMF), purchase credits from other large final emitters or purchase credits from non-large final emitters in the form of offset credits.

Criticisms against the intensity-based approach to pricing carbon include the fact that there is no hard cap on emissions and actual emissions may always continue to rise despite the fact that carbon has a price. Benefits of an intensity-based system include the fact that during economic recessions, the carbon intensity reduction will remain equally as stringent and challenging, while hard caps tend to become easily met, irrelevant and do not work to reduce emissions. Alberta has also been criticized that its goals are too weak, and that the measures enacted are not likely to achieve the goals. In 2015, the newly elected government committed to revising the climate change strategy.

=== Legislation ===
==== Emissions Management and Climate Resilience Act ====
Emissions Management and Climate Resilience Act

Legislative Assembly of Alberta
- Citation: SA 2003, c E-7.8
- Assented to: 2002
- Bill citation: Bill 32, 2002
- Introduced by: Lorne Taylor
- Introduced: 2002-11-19

Keywords
- emissions targets
- Status: In force (amended)

Under the Emissions Management and Climate Resilience Act, companies, which exceed certain emissions caps, are required to pay for carbon offsets.

In 2023, the Act was amended to simplify it and remove an obsolete provision for extending loan guarantees.

In 2023, 25 charges were filed for the first time under the Act, against a carbon offset firm, on the basis that the business provided false information related to carbon offsets. An employee was subsequently fined $10,000.

==== Fuel Tax Act ====
Fuel Tax Act

Legislative Assembly of Alberta
- Citation: SA 2006, c F-28.1
- Assented to: 2006-05-24
- Bill citation: Bill 32, 2002
- Introduced by: Lorne Taylor
- Introduced: 2002-11-19

Keywords
- fuel tax
- Status: Amended

The Fuel Tax Act implements a $0.09 per liter fuel tax on gasoline, diesel, kerosene, biodiesel sold in Alberta and a $0.02 per liter carbon tax on aviation fuel.

Alberta had the lowest fuel tax on gasoline by jurisdiction in Canada in 2008. There is no restriction on the source of ethanol for the tax to apply, unlike other provinces.

In 2022, the Premier of Alberta announced that the Government would pause collection of the fuel tax, in order to reduce cost-of-living.

==== Carbon Capture and Storage Funding Act ====
Carbon Capture and Storage Funding Act

Legislative Assembly of Alberta
- Citation: SA 2009, c C-2.5
- Assented to: 2009-06-04
- Bill citation: Bill 14, 2009
- Introduced by: Mel Knight
- Introduced: 2002-11-19

Keywords
- carbon capture and storage
- Status: In force (amended)

The Carbon Capture and Storage Funding Act allocates $2,000,000,000 of funding for carbon capture and storage development. carbon capture and storage development. The Act funded $223,000,000 for the Alberta Carbon Trunk Line, which was the world's biggest carbon capture and storage project at the time of construction.

The Act has been criticised for its negative impacts on indigenous people.

==== Climate Leadership Implementation Act ====
Climate Leadership Implementation Act

Legislative Assembly of Alberta
- Citation: SA 2016, c 16
- Assented to: 2019-06-04

Legislative history
- Bill citation: Bill 20, 2016
- Introduced by: Shannon Phillips
- First reading: 2016-05-24

Keywords
- general carbon tax
- Status: Amended

The Alberta New Democratic Party implemented a general carbon tax.

At the time, the NDP government declared that the Wildrose Party opposition did not believe in man-made climate change, noting that.Angela Pitt, a member of the legislative assembly, referred to “unicorn farts" and the Wildrose Party had never laid out a plan to reduce greenhouse gas emissions. Finance Critic Derek Fildebrandt described "alarmism" on climate change. Though the leader of the Wildrose Party did reject this, and say that the party did believe in man-made climate change.

The Act provides a rebate for most citizens.

In 2016, thousands of people protested against the carbon tax.

The initial rate of the carbon tax was $20 per tonne.

An Act to Repeal the Carbon Tax

An Act to Repeal the Carbon Tax

Legislative Assembly of Alberta
- Citation: SA 2019, c 1
- Assented to: 2019-06-04

Legislative history
- Bill citation: Bill 1, 2019
- Introduced by: Jason Kenney
- First reading: 2019-05-22

Keywords
- carbon tax repeal
- Status: In force

The United Conservative Party pledged to repeal certain aspects of the provincial carbon tax in the 2019 Alberta provincial election. The repeal of the carbon tax also created doubt over how projects like Energy Efficiency Alberta would be funded.

The Act does fully repeal the provincial carbon tax.

Subsequently to the passage of the legislation, it became possible for the Canadian government to impose the federal carbon tax, which had not received parliamentary approval yet.

==== Alberta Sovereignty Within a United Canada Act ====
Under the Alberta Sovereignty Within a United Canada Act, the Alberta government suggested that it would not abide by the federal emissions cap, which has been criticised as potentially unconstitutional. The motion to formally apply the Act to the federal emissions cap was passed in 2023.

The use of the Act was criticized as premature for occurring before the federal regulations were released.

== See also ==
- Climate change in Canada
