= Climate change in Yukon =

Climate change in Yukon affects various environments and industries.

== Greenhouse gas emissions ==
Annual greenhouse gas emissions increased by 6% between 2010 and 2022, when excluding the mining industry. Per capita emissions decreased by 12% during this time period, when excluding the mining industry. Total annual emissions increased by 24% between 2009 and 2019.

When emissions from the mining industry are included, total emissions increased by 10% between 2010 and 2022.

== Impacts of climate change ==
=== Precipitation ===
Precipitation would increase by between 13% and 17% over the 50 years from 2022 and 2072.

=== Snow cover ===
Snow cover decreased between 5% and 10% for each decade between 1981 and 2021, and this would be set to continue.

== Response ==
=== Policies ===
The Yukon government has considered subsidizing the mining industry to make the investments to reduce emissions.

The Yukon government and the Canadian federal government funded residents installing heat pumps. The program was paused due to high demand.

==== Grid Connect Project ====
The Canadian federal government made $40,000,000 for connecting Yukon to the North American power grid and infrastructure for mining for "critical minerals". Previously the Premier of Yukon had suggested that $60,000,000 would be necessary for investing in the power-grid connection. The territory had previously struggled with matching its building of infrastructure to its population growth.

=== Legislation ===
==== Clean Energy Act ====
Clean Energy Act

Legislative Assembly of Yukon
- Citation: SY 2022, c 14
- Assented to: 2022-11-16

Legislative history
- Bill citation: Bill 17 of 2022
- Introduced by: John Streicker
- First reading: 2022-10-11
- Second reading: 2022-10-13
- Third reading: 2022-11-27

Keywords
- emissions targets, electric vehicles targets
- Status: In force (amended)

At the time of the bill passing, Yukon had just experienced a historic wildfire season.

For non-mining sector emissions the Act commits the province to achieving emissions reductions corresponding to:

- 45 per cent below 2010 levels by 2030
- net-zero emissions by 2050.

The Act also commits the territory to achieving a reduction of 45% in mining emissions by 2035 compared to 2010 levels.

== See also ==
- Climate change in Canada
