= Scouting and Guiding in Nunavut =

Scouting in Nunavut did not develop until 1970, as a section of the Northwest Territories of Canada.

== Anglophone Scouting in Nunavut ==
Nunavut Council

The Northwest Territories Council of Scouts Canada was founded in 1970, with Denny R. May, son of pilot Wop May, as executive director. May also designed the logo for the Council, which depicts three Inuit in a circle with their hands linked in brotherhood. The Nunavut-specific design borrows the polar bear from the local government.

When the Northwest Territories was divided and the new territory of Nunavut was created in 1999, the Council was renamed as the NWT and Nunavut Council' This Council later merged into the Northern Lights Council of Alberta in the early 2000s. Today Nunavut falls under Voyageur Council of Ontario. Groups in Nunavut are supported under the Council Groups Area.

== Girl Guiding in Nunavut ==
Northwest Territories & Nunavut Council

Guides were served by the Girl Guides of Canada - Northwest Territories & Nunavut Council until approximately 2008, at which point Nunavut Guiding became part of Ontario Council.

== See also ==
- Greenland Guide and Scout Association
Scouting and Guiding in Canada's provinces and territories
