= Climate change in the Northwest Territories =

Climate change in the Northwest Territories is causing significant changes to the territory's natural environment, infrastructure, and the community. The Northwest Territories (NWT) are currently warming at approximately four times the global average rate. This rapid temperature increase has led to accelerating permafrost thaw, shorter winter ice road seasons, severe wildfire risks, and shifting wildlife habitats. These environmental changes directly impact regional economic industries and the traditional lifestyles of Indigenous communities throughout the territory.

== Greenhouse gas emissions ==
Between 2005 and 2021, annual greenhouse gas emissions decreased by 16%.

== Impacts of climate change ==
=== Lake ice ===
Lake ice melting has made traveling to Délı̨nę more difficult.

== Response ==
=== Policies ===
In 2024, the government of the Northwest Territories has not committed to reaching net zero emissions by 2050, but stated that this would require assistance by the federal government.

In 2024, the Northwest Territories government started to monitor archaeological sites affected by climate change. In 2024, Sahtu Renewable Resources Board started monitoring how caribou populations were affected by climate change through their feces.

Dry conditions prompted the Northwest Territories Power Corporation to apply to reduce the minimum level for which it is able to draw water from the Big Spruce reservoir.

In 2023, The NWT Association of Communities described the approach to climate change in NWT communities as piecemeal. NWT climate projects led to savings by residents, communities, businesses and the government itself of more than $12,000,000 during 2023.

== See also ==
- Climate change in Canada
