= Climate change in New Brunswick =

Köppen climate types of New Brunswick

Climate change in the Canadian province of New Brunswick affects various environments and industries, including forestry, wildlife, and coastal development. Over the last three decades, New Brunswick has seen a 1.1 °C increase in mean annual temperature. The University of Waterloo's Intact Centre on Climate Adaptation has projected a significant rise in over-30 °C days in the province by 2050.

== Greenhouse gas emissions ==
New Brunswick went from 14.7 million tonnes of greenhouse gas emissions in 1990 to over 22 million tonnes in 2004; the growth percentage of 47% made the province the second-highest percentage increase in Canada.

In April 2007, the Conservation Council of New Brunswick (CCNB) reported that New Brunswick's largest source of greenhouse gas emissions was by NB Power's generation company, with a combined total of 7.8 million tonnes emitted by the Coleson Cove, Belledune and Dalhousie generating stations. The Irving Oil Refinery, the largest oil refinery in Canada, is the largest source of emissions in the province, accounting for about 25% of total emissions in New Brunswick as of 2024.

== Impacts of climate change ==
=== Sea level rise ===
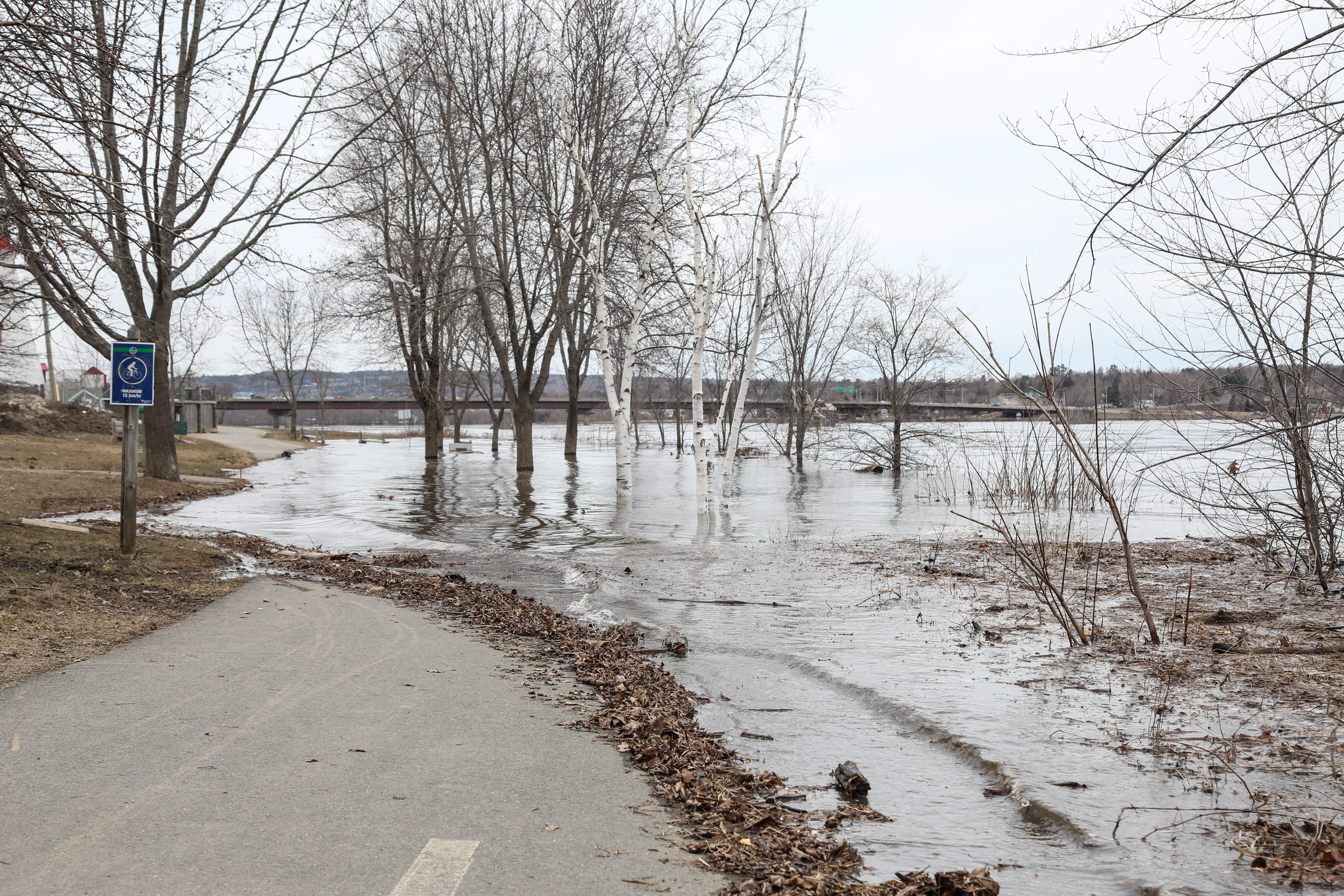
Flooded street in Fredericton

New Brunswick predicted a sea level rise of 1 metre (3.3 ft) by 2100. Given the Bay of Fundy's high tidal range, sea level rise will cause increased flood elevations, greater risks that impact the severity and frequency of coastal flooding, and lead to coastal erosion risks. Sea level rise as a result of climate change will be present and cause greater risk to coastal communities within the province such as Saint John, and will pose significant risk to geographically important areas in the province like the Isthmus of Chignecto, a small isthmus connecting the province to Nova Scotia whose protective dikes do not adequately protect the area from being prone to flooding. This will significantly impact transportation links between the two provinces such as the Canadian National Railway line and the Trans-Canada Highway, as well as nearby communities in both provinces such as Sackville in New Brunswick.

Sea level rise in New Brunswick will also result in coastal erosion, which will impact the province's coastal communities.

=== Ecosystems ===
Climate change is affecting New Brunswick's aquatic life due to warmer air and water temperatures, posing a risk to fish due to the increasing temperatures leading to faster metabolism and less energy.

=== Precipitation ===
New Brunswick has been expected to experience annual increases in the amount of precipitation, particularly in the northern part of the province. Throughout 16 communities surveyed in New Brunswick, the average precipitation rates ranged between 991 millimetres to 1,243 millimetres between 1976 and 2005, with a 6–7% annual increase within each community.

== Response ==
The Government of New Brunswick's Department of Environment released its first Climate Change Action Plan in 2007 for the years 2007–2012. Another edition was released in April 2014 for the years 2014–2020, and another, titled Transitioning to a Low-carbon Economy, was released in December 2016. Its most recent climate change action plan was released on September 21, 2022, for the years 2022–2027. Under the Climate Change Act, the action plan has a five-year review window.

On December 14, 2017, Tracadie-Sheila legislative member Serge Rousselle introduced the Climate Change Act. It was granted royal assent on March 16, 2018. Included within the act are target levels and regulations set for the reduction of greenhouse gas emissions, along with the ensured establishment of a Climate Change Action Plan as well as a Climate Change Fund.

In December 2019, members of the Legislative Assembly of New Brunswick (MLAs) unanimously approved for the creation of a standing committee, the Standing Committee on Climate Change and Environmental Stewardship. Members of the committee are all-party MLAs. As of the formation of the 61st New Brunswick Legislature in November 2024, the committee chair is Jacques LeBlanc.

== See also ==
- Climate change in Canada
