= First Nations in Prince Edward Island =

Groups of indigenous people who live on Prince Edward Island

There are two First Nations on Prince Edward Island: the Abegweit First Nation and the Lennox Island First Nation. Ethnically, they are both Mi’kmaq. Each of these nations have two reserves. Of PEI's 1,405 registered Mi'kmaq (2021), only 615 live on one of the four reserves.

== Band governments ==
- Abegweit First Nation
- Lennox Island First Nation
