= Climate change in Newfoundland and Labrador =

Climate change in the Canadian province of Newfoundland and Labrador affects various environments and industries, including fishing.

== Greenhouse gas emissions ==
In 2019, the government committed to reducing emissions to 7.4 million tonnes, by 2030, which would be a reduction of 30% compared to its 2005 emissions.

== Impacts of climate change ==
In 2022, the province's coastal roads have collapsed in multiple places.

Forest fires would be enabled and an increase in the rate at which forest fires occur is expected.

== Response ==
=== Policies ===
In 2022, the Newfoundland and Labrador government has approved significant numbers of oil extraction projects. As Premier, Andrew Furey attended COP26 to promote oil and gas projects in the province as aof energy with "low emissions". In 2023, the Federal Government released its new regulatory framework with an acknowledgement that Newfoundland and Labrador's oil and gas projects were different due to being offshore. For most communities in Newfoundland and Labrador, their local government had not started planning for climate change, as of 2022.

=== Legislation ===
==== Management of Greenhouse Gas Act ====
Management of Greenhouse Gas Act

House of Assembly of Newfoundland and Labrador
- Citation: SNL 2016, c M-1.001

Keywords
- emissions targets, carbon tax
- Status: In force

The Management of Greenhouse Gas Act regulates industrial greenhouse gas emissions. Upon introducing the bill, the Environment Minister described it as striking the "right balance". The Minister also described the previous state of affairs as making the province a laggard, because there was no provincial legislation to regulate greenhouse gases.

The Act establishes a "Green Transition Fund" for supporting the development of renewables.

== See also ==
- Climate change in Canada
