= Scouting and Guiding in the Northwest Territories =

Scouting in the Northwest Territories did not develop until 1970, due to the sparse population of the Northwest Territories.

== Anglophone Scouting in the Northwest Territories ==
The Northwest Territories Council of Scouts Canada was founded in 1970, with Denny R. May (1935–2021), son of pilot Wop May, as executive director. May also designed the logo for the council, which depicts three Inuit in a circle with their hands linked in brotherhood.

When the Northwest Territories was divided and the new territory of Nunavut was created in 1999, the council was renamed as the NWT and Nunavut Council This Council later merged into the Northern Lights Council of Alberta in the early 2000s. Today Nunavut falls under Voyageur Council (Ottawa Valley and surrounding region).

== Girl Guiding in the Northwest Territories ==
Guides are served by the Guiding in Canada - Northwest Territories & Nunavut Council

== See also ==
Scouting and Guiding in Canada's provinces and territories
