= Demographics of Nunavut =

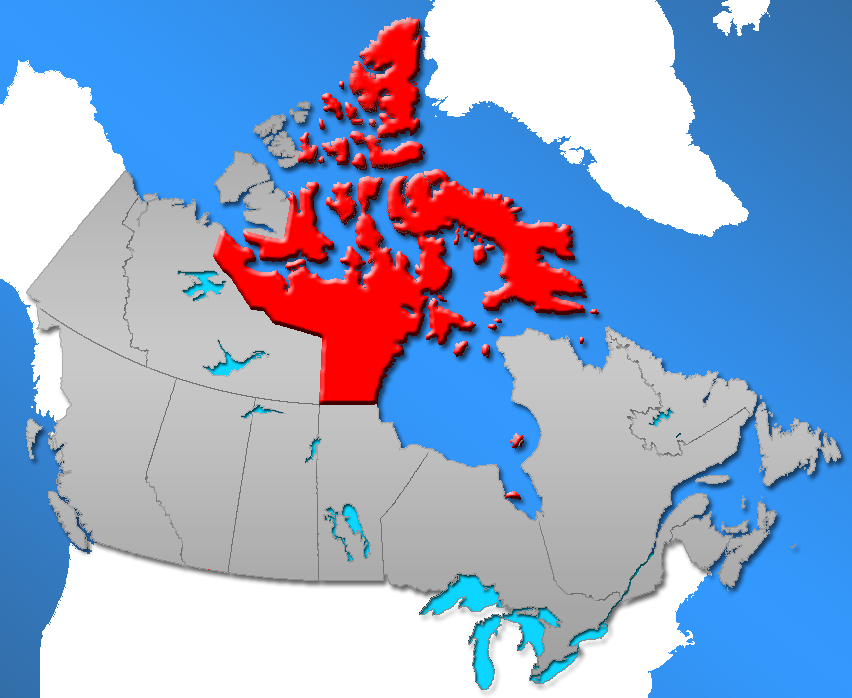
Demographics of Canada's provinces and territories

Nunavut is the largest and northernmost territory of Canada. It has a land area of 1,877,787.62 km^{2} (725,017.85 sq mi). It has a population of 36,858 in the 2021 Census. In the 2016 census the population was 35,944, up 12.7% from the 2011 census figure of 31,906. In 2016, 30,135 people identified themselves as Inuit (83.8% of the total population), 190 as North American Indian (0.5%), 165 Métis (0.5%) and 5,025 as non-aboriginal (14.0%).

Nunavut's small and sparse population makes it unlikely the territory will be granted provincial status in the foreseeable future.

== Age structure ==
The median age in Nunavut is 25.1 years, according to the 2016 census. This is significantly younger than the median age of Canada (41.2 years). Those aged 65 years and over account for 3.8% of the population.

== Population history ==
View chart definition.

Historical population
Year	Pop.	±%
1996	24,730	—
2001	26,745	+8.1%
2006	29,474	+10.2%
2011	31,906	+8.3%
2016	35,944	+12.7%
2021	36,858	+2.5%

== Population geography ==
=== Communities with more than 1,000 people ===
Municipality	2011	% change	2006	% change	2001	% change
Iqaluit^{a}	6,699	8.3	6,184	18.1	5,236	24.1
Arviat	2,318	12.5	2,060	8.5	1,899	21.8
Rankin Inlet^{a}	2,266	-3.9	2,358	8.3	2,177	5.8
Baker Lake	1,872	8.3	1,728	14.7	1,507	8.8
Cambridge Bay^{a}	1,608	8.9	1,477	12.8	1,309	-3.1
Pond Inlet	1,549	17.8	1,315	7.8	1,220	5.7
Igloolik	1,454	-5.5	1,538	19.6	1,286	5.5
Kugluktuk	1,450	11.4	1,320	7.4	1,212	0.9
Pangnirtung	1,425	7.5	1,325	3.8	1,276	2.7
Kinngait	1,363	10.3	1,236	7.7	1,148	2.7
Gjoa Haven	1,279	20.2	1,064	10.8	960	9.2

== Visible minorities and Indigenous peoples ==
Visible minority & Indigenous population in Nunavut (2001–2021)
Group	Population	2021 census		2016 census		2011 census		2006 census		2001 census	
Group	Population	Pop.	%	Pop.	%	Pop.	%	Pop.	%	Pop.	%
Indigenous (Note: Statistics Canada defines Indigenous identity as persons who identify with the Indigenous Peoples of Canada.) group	Inuk (Inuit)	30,865	84.33%	30,135	84.7%	27,070	85.39%	24,640	84.02%	22,560	84.61%
Indigenous group	Multiple Indigenous responses	195	0.53%	55	0.15%	20	0.06%	30	0.1%	0	0%
Indigenous group	First Nations	180	0.49%	190	0.53%	130	0.41%	100	0.34%	95	0.36%
Indigenous group	Métis	120	0.33%	165	0.46%	135	0.43%	125	0.43%	55	0.21%
Indigenous group	Indigenous responses, n.i.e.	30	0.08%	10	0.03%	15	0.05%	20	0.07%	10	0.04%
Total Indigenous population (Note: Single responses only unless otherwise specified.)		31,390	85.77%	30,555	85.88%	27,360	86.31%	24,915	84.96%	22,720	85.21%
Non-Indigenous / non-visible minority group	British Isles (Note: Including multiple responses.) (Note: 1996-present census populations for British Isles and French origins may be undercounts, due to the creation of the "Canadian" ethnic origin category. All citizens of Canada are classified as "Canadians" as defined by Canada's nationality laws. However, "Canadian" as an ethnic group has since 1996 been added to census questionnaires for possible ancestry. "Canadian" was included as an example on the English questionnaire and "Canadien" as an example on the French questionnaire. "The majority of respondents to this selection are from the eastern part of the country that was first settled. Respondents generally are visibly European (Anglophones and Francophones), however no-longer self identify with their ethnic ancestral origins. This response is attributed to a multitude or generational distance from ancestral lineage. Source 1: Jack Jedwab (April 2008). "Our 'Cense' of Self: the 2006 Census saw 1.6 million 'Canadian' Canadians Return to British and French origins" (PDF). Association for Canadian Studies. p. 2. Archived from the original (PDF) on October 2, 2011. "Virtually all persons who reported "Canadian" in 1996 had English or French as a mother tongue, were born in Canada and had both parents born inside Canada. This suggests that many of these respondents were people whose families have been in this country for several generations. In effect the "new Canadians" were persons that previously reported either British or French origins. Moreover in 1996 some 55% of people with both parents born in Canada reported Canadian (alone or in combination with other origins). By contrast, only 4% of people with both parents born outside Canada reported Canadian. Thus the Canadian response did not appeal widely to either immigrants or their children. Most important however was that nearly half of those persons reporting Canadian origin in 1996 were in Quebec this represented a majority of the mother tongue francophone population[...]In the 2001 Census, 11.7 million people, or 39% of the total population, reported Canadian as their ethnic origin, either alone or in combination with other origins. Some 4.9 million Quebecers out of 7.1 million individuals reported Canadian or "Canadien" thus accounting for nearly seven in ten persons (nearly eighty percent of francophones in Quebec)." Source 2: Don Kerr (2007). The Changing Face of Canada: Essential Readings in Population. Canadian Scholars' Press. pp. 313–317. ISBN 978-1-55130-322-2. Source 3: Jantzen (2006) Footnote 5: Note that Canadian and Canadien have been separated since the two terms mean different things. In English, it usually means someone whose family has been in Canada for multiple generations. In French it is referring to "Les Habitants", settlers of New France during the 17th and 18th centuries who earned their living primarily from agricultural labour. Source 4: Jantzen (2006): The reporting of French New World ancestries (Canadien, Québécois, and French-Canadian) is concentrated in the 4th+ generations; 79% of French-Canadian, 88% of Canadien and 90% of Québécois are in the 4th+generations category. Source 5: Jantzen (2005): According to Table 3, the 4th+ generations are highest because of a strong sense of belonging to their ethnic or cultural group among those respondents reporting the New World ancestries of Canadien and Québécois. Source 6: Jantzen (2006): For respondents of French and New World ancestries the pattern is different. Where generational data is available, it is possible to see that not all respondents reporting these ancestries report a high sense of belonging to their ethnic or cultural group. The high proportions are focused among those respondents that are in the 4th+ generations, and unlike with the British Isles example, the difference between the 2nd and 3rd generations to the 4th+ generation is more pronounced. Since these ancestries are concentrated in the 4th+ generations, their high proportions of sense of belonging to ethnic or cultural group push up the 4th+ generational results.)	4,110	11.23%	5,815	16.34%	4,810	15.17%	4,260	14.53%	3,825	14.34%
Non-Indigenous / non-visible minority group	French	1,175	3.21%	1,645	4.62%	1,125	3.55%	980	3.34%	850	3.19%
Non-Indigenous / non-visible minority group	Western European	850	2.32%	980	2.75%	800	2.52%	680	2.32%	510	1.91%
Non-Indigenous / non-visible minority group	Eastern European	455	1.24%	515	1.45%	400	1.26%	375	1.28%	320	1.2%
Non-Indigenous / non-visible minority group	Northern European	440	1.2%	675	1.9%	385	1.21%	345	1.18%	295	1.11%
Non-Indigenous / non-visible minority group	Southern European	415	1.13%	420	1.18%	390	1.23%	240	0.82%	190	0.71%
Non-Indigenous / non-visible minority group	European, n.i.e. & n.o.s.	410	1.12%	340	0.96%	200	0.63%	100	0.34%	50	0.19%
Total non-Indigenous / non-visible minority population		3,890	10.63%	4,120	11.58%	3,830	12.08%	3,990	13.61%	3,735	14.01%
Visible minority (Note: Statistics Canada defines visible minorities as defined in the Employment Equity Act which defines visible minorities as "persons, other than Aboriginal peoples, who are non-Caucasian in race or non-white in colour".) group	Black	565	1.54%	330	0.93%	115	0.36%	100	0.34%	65	0.24%
Visible minority group	Filipino	310	0.85%	230	0.65%	130	0.41%	80	0.27%	35	0.13%
Visible minority group	South Asian	180	0.49%	115	0.32%	95	0.3%	85	0.29%	30	0.11%
Visible minority group	Chinese	65	0.18%	70	0.2%	65	0.21%	75	0.26%	35	0.13%
Visible minority group	Latin American	60	0.16%	40	0.11%	30	0.09%	20	0.07%	10	0.04%
Visible minority group	Multiple visible minorities	50	0.14%	15	0.04%	0	0%	15	0.05%	0	0%
Visible minority group	Arab	35	0.1%	40	0.11%	15	0.05%	15	0.05%	10	0.04%
Visible minority group	Visible minority, n.i.e.	25	0.07%	20	0.06%	0	0%	10	0.03%	0	0%
Visible minority group	Southeast Asian	20	0.05%	25	0.07%	25	0.08%	10	0.03%	10	0.04%
Visible minority group	Japanese	10	0.03%	0	0%	10	0.03%	10	0.03%	0	0%
Visible minority group	Korean	0	0%	10	0.03%	10	0.03%	10	0.03%	10	0.04%
Visible minority group	West Asian	0	0%	10	0.03%	10	0.03%	0	0%	10	0.04%
Total visible minority population		1,320	3.61%	905	2.54%	510	1.61%	420	1.43%	210	0.79%
Total responses		36,600	99.3%	35,580	98.99%	31,700	99.35%	29,325	99.49%	26,665	99.7%
Total population		36,858	100%	35,944	100%	31,906	100%	29,474	100%	26,745	100%

== Language ==
The 2016 Canadian census showed a population of 35,944. In terms of 'mother tongue', 34,960 people were reported as learned a single language first. The languages most commonly reported were:

1.	Inuktitut^{b}	22,070	63.1%
2.	English^{b}	11,020	31.5%
3.	French^{b}	595	1.7%
4.	Inuinnaqtun^{b}	495	1.4%
5.	Indo-European languages	270	0.8%
6.	Tagalog	135	0.4%
	Other languages	375	1.1%

There were also 735 responses of both English and a 'non-official language' (mainly Inuktitut); 10 of both French and a 'non-official language; 25 of both English and French; and about 140 people who either did not respond to the question, or reported multiple non-official languages, or else gave some other unenumerated response. Only English and French were counted as official languages in the census. Figures shown are for the number of single language responses and the percentage of total single-language responses.

== Religion ==
The dominant religion in Nunavut is Christianity; Catholicism, Anglicanism and Pentecostalism are highly prevalent.

Religious groups in Nunavut (1991−2021)
Religious group	2021 Canadian census		2011 Canadian census		2001 Canadian census		1991 Canadian census	
Religious group	Pop.	%	Pop.	%	Pop.	%	Pop.	%
Christianity	26,915	73.53%	27,255	85.99%	24,855	93.19%	20,290	95.73%
Irreligion	9,115	24.9%	4,100	12.94%	1,655	6.21%	775	3.66%
Indigenous spirituality	180	0.49%	135	0.43%	30	0.11%	10	0.05%
Islam	140	0.38%	50	0.16%	30	0.11%	10	0.05%
Hinduism	60	0.16%	35	0.11%	10	0.04%	10	0.05%
Judaism	35	0.1%	10	0.03%	10	0.04%	10	0.05%
Buddhism	20	0.05%	20	0.06%	20	0.07%	20	0.09%
Sikhism	10	0.03%	10	0.03%	10	0.04%	10	0.05%
Other	135	0.37%	85	0.27%	70	0.26%	65	0.31%
Total responses	36,605	99.31%	31,695	99.34%	26,670	99.72%	21,195	100%
Total population	36,858	100%	31,906	100%	26,745	100%	—N/a	—N/a

== Migration ==
=== Immigration ===
The 2021 census reported that immigrants (individuals born outside Canada) comprise 1,165 persons or 3.2 percent of the total population of Nunavut. Five years prior, the 2016 census counted a total of only about 920 immigrants in Nunavut, including about 185 from the Philippines, 80 from the United Kingdom, 60 from the United States, 35 from Zimbabwe and 30 each from India, Nigeria and Pakistan.

Immigrants in Nunavut by country of birth
Country of birth	2021 census		2016 census		2011 census		2006 census		2001 census	
Country of birth	Pop.	%	Pop.	%	Pop.	%	Pop.	%	Pop.	%
Philippines	260	22.3%	185	20.1%	100	16.3%	40	8.9%	25	5.6%
United States	65	5.6%	60	6.5%	65	10.6%	40	8.9%	55	12.4%
Nigeria	65	5.6%	30	3.3%	15	2.4%	10	2.2%	10	2.2%
Zimbabwe	60	5.2%	35	3.8%	0	0%	0	0%	0	0%
Cameroon	60	5.2%	20	2.2%	0	0%	0	0%	0	0%
India	60	5.2%	30	3.3%	35	5.7%	20	4.4%	10	2.2%
United Kingdom	55	4.7%	80	8.7%	100	16.3%	90	20%	125	28.1%
Jamaica	45	3.9%	25	2.7%	10	1.6%	10	2.2%	10	2.2%
Pakistan	30	2.6%	30	3.3%	10	1.6%	10	2.2%	10	2.2%
China	25	2.1%	20	2.2%	25	4.1%	20	4.4%	10	2.2%
Total immigrants	1,165	3.2%	920	2.6%	615	1.9%	450	1.5%	445	1.7%
Total responses	36,600	99.3%	35,580	99%	31,700	99.4%	29,325	99.5%	26,665	99.7%
Total population	36,858	100%	35,944	100%	31,906	100%	29,474	100%	26,745	100%

=== Recent immigration ===
The 2021 Canadian census counted a total of 250 people who immigrated to Nunavut between 2016 and 2021.

Recent immigrants to Nunavut by country of birth (2016 to 2021)
Country of birth	Population	% recent immigrants
Philippines	50	20%
Nigeria	20	8%
India	20	8%
United States	15	6%
Jamaica	15	6%
Zimbabwe	10	4%
Cameroon	10	4%
United Kingdom	10	4%
Pakistan	10	4%
China	10	4%
Ethiopia	10	4%
France	10	4%
Ghana	10	4%
Mexico	10	4%
Brazil	10	4%
Ukraine	10	4%
Libya	10	4%
Morocco	10	4%
Total recent immigrants	250	100%

=== Internal migration ===
While there is some internal migration from the rest of Canada to Nunavut (usually on a temporary basis), there is very little external migration from outside of Canada to Nunavut.

A total of 4,940 people moved to Nunavut from other parts of Canada between 1996 and 2006 while 5,615 people moved in the opposite direction. These movements resulted in a net influx of 355 from Newfoundland and Labrador; and a net outmigration of 355 to Alberta, 295 to the Northwest Territories, 235 to Ontario and 160 to Quebec. There was a net outmigration of 150 francophones from Nunavut to Quebec during this period. (All net inter-provincial and official minority movements of more than 100 persons are given).

== See also ==
- List of communities in Nunavut
- Demographics of Canada
- Population of Canada by province and territory

== Notes ==
- ^a Iqaluit is both the capital of Nunavut and the regional centre for the Qikiqtaaluk Region, while Rankin Inlet and Cambridge Bay are the regional centres for the Kivalliq and Kitikmeot Regions respectively.
- ^b Official language of Nunavut
