= Tryggvi Julius Oleson =

Canadian historian

Professor Tryggvi Julius Oleson FRSC
- Born: 1912; Glenboro, Manitoba
- Died: October 9, 1963 (aged 50–51); Winnipeg
- Occupation: Professor of History
- Years active: 1936–1963
- Title: Professor
- Awards: Fellow of the Royal Society of Canada; Guggenheim Fellowship, 1956

Academic background
- Education: University of Toronto – Pontifical Institute of Mediaeval Studies
- Thesis: The Witenagemot in the Reign of King Edward the Confessor
- Doctoral advisor: Bertie Wilkinson

Academic work
- Discipline: History (European and North America)
- Sub-discipline: Early Medieval and Norse history
- Notable works: Early Voyages and Northern Approaches
- Notable ideas: Thule culture was a merger of Norse culture and Dorset culture

Tryggvi Julius Oleson, (1912–1963) was a Canadian historian from Manitoba. Of Icelandic heritage, he specialised in the early medieval period and Norse history. He was the author of Early Voyages and Northern Approaches, the first volume in the Canadian Centenary Series, a collection of historical texts by leading historians to commemorate the centennial of Canada in 1967.

Early Voyages and Northern Approaches proved controversial because of Oleson's theory that the Thule culture, the predecessor of the Inuit, was the result of inter-mingling between Norse people from Greenland and Iceland, and Arctic inhabitants of the pre-existing Dorset culture. This thesis helped explain the origins of the Thule culture, and the contemporaneous gradual disappearance of the Norse settlements in Greenland. The book attracted considerable academic criticism, but Oleson was not able to publish any rebuttals as he died shortly after it was published.

== Early life and family ==
Oleson was born in 1912 in the village of Glenboro, Manitoba, to Gudni Julius Oleson and Gudrun Kristin Thomson, who were from the Icelandic community at Gimli, Manitoba. He studied history at the University of Manitoba with an interest in early medieval European history and the Norse culture, graduating with an MA in Roman history in 1936. He went on to post-graduate studies at the University of Toronto, including studying at the Pontifical Institute of Mediaeval Studies. His dissertation was published in 1955 as The Witenagemot in the Reign of King Edward the Confessor.

He married Elva Hulda Eyford. The couple had three children.

== Academic career ==
=== Teaching ===
Returning to Manitoba, Oleson began his teaching career at the Jon Bjarnason Academy, a private Icelandic school in Winnipeg. He later lectured in history at the University of British Columbia and at United College (now the University of Winnipeg). In 1950, he joined the history department at the University of Manitoba, becoming a full professor in 1957. Oleson was awarded a Guggenheim Fellowship in 1956. He was inducted as a Fellow of the Royal Society of Canada.

=== Early Voyages and Northern Approaches ===
In the early 1960s, two major Canadian historians, Donald Creighton and W.L. Morton, planned the Canadian Centenary Series as a centennial project to commemorate the centennial of Canadian Confederation. They envisioned a multi-volume historical series written by leading historians, covering the history of Canada up to 1967. They asked Oleson to write the first volume in the series, covering the early European explorations in what became Canada.

Oleson published Early Voyages and Northern Approaches in 1963. The book covered two different aspects of the early European explorations: the westward expansion of the Norse, to Iceland, Greenland and the northern portions of Canada, and later European explorations in the Arctic, primarily by English explorers searching for the North-West Passage to Asia. His primary thesis in relation to the early Norse explorations was that the Thule culture of the High Arctic was the result of inter-marriage and cultural fusions between the Norse settlers of Greenland, moving west into the Arctic, and the pre-existing Dorset culture.

In support of this thesis, Oleson relied on his interpretation of archaeological evidence, such as the structure of stone shelters in the eastern Arctic which he saw as similar to Icelandic structures; the development of a sea-culture including whaling from small boats, which he saw as similar to Norse practices, and a body of academic historical research from Icelandic scholars, which was not generally available to Canadian researchers. He also relied on the Norse sagas, which have several descriptions of encounters between Norse and indigenous peoples of the Arctic. Oleson's thesis also helped to explain the gradual disappearance of the Norse settlements in Greenland. In his view, they did not simply disappear; rather, the Norse gradually fused with the Dorset peoples of the High Arctic.

=== Academic response ===
Oleson's thesis was controversial and attracted considerable opposition and critical reviews, particularly from practitioners of Arctic archaeology. The prevailing interpretation was that the Thule culture had its origins in Alaska and had moved eastward. Oleson's thesis was that the Thule originated in the eastern Arctic and gradually moved westward. Several reviewers challenged Oleson's interpretation, particularly William Taylor, who was one of the leading experts in Arctic archaeology at the National Museum of Canada, as well as Wilcomb E. Washburn from the Smithsonian Institution. The one contemporary review which was more favourable was from Thomas E. Lee, another archaeologist from the National Museum of Canada, who wrote that he had read Oleson's "tremendous work" six times, cover to cover, and thought it was "...by far the most important and instructive single work to come out of Arctic research in this field in recent times."

The general editors of the Centenary Series were somewhat taken aback by the criticism and sometimes hostile reaction to Oleson's book, but were hampered in their ability to respond by his death. The approach which they took was to re-issue the book five years later, and to include some of the critical response to the thesis of cultural fusion as a forward to the text.

More recently, there has been a re-examination of Oleson's work and treatment of his sources, and a more favourable view of his position has sometimes been stated.

== Death ==
Oleson died in 1963, shortly after Early Voyages and Northern Approaches was published.

== Publications ==
Dictionary of Canadian Biography, Volume I (numerous entries): Introductory Essay: The Northern Approaches to Canada [in collaboration with W. L. Morton]; Bjarni Herjólfsson; Saint Brendan; John Cunningham; Eirikr (Eric) upsi Gnupsson; Eirikr Thorvaldsson (Eric the Red); Leifr heppni Eiriksson (Leif the Lucky); Nicholas of Lynne; Snorri Thorfinnsson; Thorfinnr karlsefni Thordarson; Nicolò and Antonio Zeno.

Early Voyages and Northern Approaches, Volume 1 of the Canadian Centenary Series (Toronto: McClelland and Stewart Ltd., 1963; re-issued with additional material, 1968).

The Norsemen in America (Ottawa: Canadian Historical Association, 1963) (CHA Historical Booklet No. 14).

Saga Islendinga i Vesturheimi (History of the Icelanders in the Western Hemisphere), volumes 4 and 5 (Reykjavik, 1955–1953).
