= Glazebrook (surname) =

Glazebrook is a surname, and may refer to:

- Allison Glazebrook (born 1966), Canadian classicist
- Bob Glazebrook (born 1956), American football player
- Chrissie Glazebrook (1945–2007), British writer
- George Glazebrook (1899–1989), Canadian historian and diplomat
- Harriet A. Glazebrook (1847–1937), English author and temperance movement activist
- Hugh De Twenebrokes Glazebrook (1855–1937), British painter, brother of Michael George Glazebrook
- James Glazebrook (1744–1803), English cleric, controversialist and writer
- Jane Glazebrook, American botanist
- Karl Glazebrook (born 1965), Anglo-Australian astronomer
- Michael George Glazebrook (1853–1926), British educator and athlete
- Otis Allan Glazebrook (1845–1931), Episcopal priest, U.S. Consul, founder of Alpha Tau Omega
- Peter Glazebrook, English vegetable grower
- Philip Glazebrook (1880–1918), British politician
- Sir Richard Glazebrook (1854–1935), English physicist
- Susan Glazebrook (born 1956), New Zealand judge
- Tom Glazebrook, Australian rugby league footballer
