= Arthur Silver Morton =

Canadian historian, archivist, and academic

Arthur Silver Morton FRSC
- Born: 16 May 1870; Iere Village, Trinidad and Tobago
- Died: 26 January 1945 (aged 74)

Academic background
- Education: University of Edinburgh

Academic work
- Discipline: History
- Institutions: University of Saskatchewan; Provincial Archives of Saskatchewan
- Notable works: A History of the Canadian West to 1870–71 (1939)

Arthur Silver Morton FRSC (1870–1945) was a Canadian historian, archivist, and academic.

Born in Iere Village, Trinidad, on 16 May 1870, Morton studied at the University of Edinburgh before moving to Canada to become a Presbyterian minister. He was chief librarian and head of the history department at the University of Saskatchewan. He also served as the first provincial archivist of Saskatchewan from 1938 until 1945.

His publications included The History of Prairie Settlement and History of the Canadian West to 1870–71. He was named a Person of National Historic Significance in 1952. He was also a Fellow of the Royal Society of Canada and a recipient of the Tyrrell Medal.

Morton died on 26 January 1945.

== Works ==
- The Way To Union, (1912)
- Under Western Skies: Pen-Pictures Of The Canadian West, (1937)
- The History of Prairie Settlement, (1938)
- A History Of The Canadian West To 1870-71, (1939)
- Sir George Simpson: Hudson's Bay Company, (1944)

Awards
Preceded by Chester Martin	J. B. Tyrrell Historical Medal; 1941	Succeeded by D. C. Harvey
