= Canadian Historical Association =

Canadian not-for-profit organization

- Abbreviation: CHA
- Formation: 1922
- Type: Historical association
- Legal status: Active
- Purpose: Foster the scholarly study and communication of history in Canada
- Headquarters: Ottawa, Ontario, Canada
- Region served: Canada
- Members: 900+
- Official language: English, French
- President: Colin M. Coates
- Affiliations: CFHSS
- Website: www.cha-shc.ca

The Canadian Historical Association (CHA; French: Société historique du Canada, SHC) is a Canadian organization founded in 1922 for the purposes of promoting historical research and scholarship. It is a bilingual, not-for-profit, charitable organization, the largest of its kind in Canada. According to the Association, it "seeks to encourage the integration of historical knowledge and perspectives in both the scholarly and public spheres, to ensure the accessibility of historical resources, and to defend the rights and freedoms of emerging and professional historians in the pursuit of historical inquiry as well as those of history degree holders who utilize the analytical, research, communication, and writing skills they acquired during their studies to pursue a variety of career paths inside or outside of academia."

== Activities ==
The CHA represents historians in Canada and acts as a public advocate for the field. Within the historical profession, the CHA helps to set ethical standards for research and has published a Statement on Research Ethics. The Association organizes annual meetings for members and publishes the Journal of the Canadian Historical Association, The CHA Bulletin and series of booklets featuring concise treatments of particular aspects of Canadian history in an international context. The CHA has also created a microsite, What Can you Do With a History Degree? , which profiles individuals with history degrees who work in a variety of fields. Other activities include lobbying government agencies, libraries, and archives on matters related to document preservation and availability.

The current CHA president is Colin M. Coates of York University.

An affiliated committee of the Canadian Historical Association, the Canadian Committee on Labour History, publishes the journal Labour/Le Travail. It holds an annual conference together with other scholarly groups as part of the Congress of the Canadian Federation for the Humanities and Social Sciences (the "Learneds").

Other affiliated committees include:

- Aboriginal History Group
- Active History Group
- Canadian Business History Association
- Canadian Committee for Digital History
- Canadian Committee on the History of Sexuality
- Canadian Committee on Labour History
- Canadian Committee on Migration, Ethnicity and Transnationalism
- Canadian Committee on Military History
- Canadian Committee on Women's History
- Canadian Network for Economic History
- Canadian Network on Humanitarian History
- Canadian Oral History Association
- Committee on the Second World War
- Canadian Urban History Caucus
- Environmental History Group
- Graduate Students' Committee
- History of Children and Youth Group
- International Committee of Historical Sciences
- Media And Communication History Committee
- Political History Group
- Public History Group

== History ==
=== Early years ===
The Canadian Historical Association was founded in 1922 by Lawrence Burpee. That year, Burpee presented a new constitution for the Historic Landmarks Association (founded in 1907), which was adopted, changing the name and objectives of the organization. Burpee's model for the Canadian Historical Association was based on the American Historical Association, which was founded in 1884.

The first Canadian Historical Association Executive and Council included George Wrong, Chester Martin, Arthur Doughty, Pierre-Georges Roy, James Kenny, Lawrence Burpee, William Douw Lighthall, and Frederic William Howay. Marius Barbeau was its founding Secretary. Lighthall nominated Burpee for the presidency of the Canadian Historical Association, and Burpee was president from 1923 to 1925 and continued his involvement as chairman of the management committee until 1934.

Over the course of the 1920s, the Canadian Historical Association saw its annual meeting become a scholarly conference. It also became a social event for historians to reconnect with each other. In 1926, Frank Underhill wrote a letter to Charles Cochrane, the Secretary-Treasurer at the time, encouraging the Canadian Historical Association to model its annual meeting after the American Historical Association. Underhill later suggested that the annual meeting be organized around a particular theme. Cochrane agreed to both suggestions. In 1927, the annual meeting was held at the University of Toronto. The format in 1927 became the basic format of the annual meeting. In 1928, the annual meeting was held in Winnipeg.

In 1929, Rodolphe Lemieux became president, he was succeeded by Robert Borden. In 1931, Frederic William Howay became president and he was succeeded by John Clarence Webster in 1932.

In 1933, the Canadian Historical Association held its annual meeting in conjunction with the Canadian Political Science Association. They met separately, but gathered for a joint session and some social events. Based on the success of their joint meeting, they established a joint membership in 1936 at the cost of four dollars.

In 1937, the CHA was invited by the CBC to prepare a series of radio broadcasts on forgotten Canadians. The Association created a Radio Committee with Toronto's George Glazebrook as chair. Over twelve months the committee paired specific historians with specific topics in a series of twenty-seven broadcasts.

In late 1939, the Royal Society of Canada approached the CHA with an offer to become a subgroup of the Society, but after Donald Creighton and Reginald Trotter met with representatives of the Society it was decided that the Canadian Historical Association would not accept this offer.

=== Recent years ===
In 2017, in response to public conversations about the legacies of Canadian historical figures and in particular their roles in the genocide of Indigenous peoples, the CHA council proposed changing the name of one of its flagship awards, the Sir John A. Macdonald Prize. The award was an annual prize established in 1977 and given to the book making the most significant contribution to Canadian historical understanding. In 2014, the prize had been awarded to James Daschuk for his book Clearing the Plains: Disease, Politics of Starvation, and the Loss of Aboriginal Life, which in part highlighted Macdonald's role in the forced starvation of Plains Indigenous peoples in the late 19th century. Daschuk noted that winning the award for this book was "ironic" and was vocally in favour of rebranding the prize. In May 2018 at its annual meeting in Regina, CHA members voted overwhelmingly in favour of the name change, by a margin of 121–11. The prize was renamed the CHA Best Scholarly Book in Canadian History Prize.

== Controversy ==
Several Canadian historians are concerned that the CHA has been recently "more about activism than good scholarship" or that from the 1990s onwards the CHA has moved too close to social history at the expense of political history, diplomatic history and military history. For example, on 1 July 2021, the CHA issued a statement regarding Canada's past treatment of Indigenous peoples, claiming the existence of a "broad consensus" among historical experts that "genocidal intent has been amply established". In response, on 12 August The Dorchester Review published an open letter from 53 historians (many of whom were past members of the CHA) disputing this claim. Authors included Margaret MacMillan; Robert J. Young; Robert Bothwell; J.L. Granatstein, author of Who Killed Canadian History?; and Prof Jim Miller, emeritus professor of history at the University of Saskatchewan. This letter was in turn criticized immediately by seven historians in Native American studies.

== Prizes ==
As part of its mandate to promote and recognize excellence in historical research, the CHA administers the following prizes:

- François-Xavier Garneau Medal, awarded every five years honours an outstanding Canadian contribution to historical research
- CHA Best Scholarly Book in Canadian History Prize, an annual prize for non-fiction work of Canadian history judged to have made the most significant contribution to an understanding of the Canadian past
- The Wallace K. Ferguson Prize, an annual prize for an outstanding scholarly book in a field of history other than Canadian history
- The Clio Prizes, given for meritorious publications or for exceptional contributions by individuals or organizations to regional history
- The Albert B. Corey Prize, an award once every two years jointly with the American Historical Association, for best book dealing with the history of Canadian-American relations or the history of both countries
- The John Bullen Prize, awarded for the outstanding historical dissertation written for a doctoral degree at a Canadian university
- The CHA Journal Prize, awarded every year for the best essay published each year in the Journal of the Canadian Historical Association
- CCWH Book Prize in Women's and Gender History, awarded every two years to the best book published in the field in the previous two years, in either English or French
- The Hilda Neatby Prize, awarded annually for the best articles in French and English on women's history
- Other prizes include: The Canadian Aboriginal History Book Prize, Political History Prize – Best Book, Political History Prize – Best Article, Public History Prize, The Eugene Forsey Prize, The Neil Sutherland Article Prize and Best article on the History of Sexuality.

== Presidents ==
- L. J. Burpee, 1922–25
- Thomas Chapais, 1925–26
- George M. Wrong, 1926–27
- A. G. Doughty, 1927–28
- Chester Martin, 1928–29
- Rodolphe Lemieux, 1929–30
- Sir Robert Borden, 1930–31
- F. W. Howay, 1931–32
- J. C. Webster, 1932–33
- Duncan McArthur, 1933–34
- F. J. Audet, 1934–35
- E. R. Adair, 1935–36
- Chester W. New, 1936–37
- D. C. Harvey, 1937–38
- R. G. Trotter, 1938–39
- J. B. Brebner, 1939–40
- Gustave Lanctôt, 1940–41
- Fred Landon, 1941–42
- Arthur Lower, 1942–43
- George W. Brown, 1943–44
- W. N. Sage, 1944–45
- Frank H. Underhill, 1945–46
- H. N. Fieldhouse, 1946–47
- Fred H. Soward, 1947–48
- Arthur Maheux, 1948–49
- A. L. Burt, 1949–50
- George E. Wilson, 1950–51
- Jean Bruchési, 1951–52
- C. P. Stacey, 1952–53
- M. H. Long, 1953–54
- J. J. Talman, 1954–55
- G. F. G. Stanley, 1955–56
- Donald Creighton, 1956–57
- W. Kaye Lamb, 1957–58
- Antoine d'Éschambault, 1958–59
- W. L. Morton, 1959–60
- Wallace K. Ferguson, 1960–61
- R. A. Preston, 1961–62
- Hilda Neatby, 1962–63
- Marcel Trudel, 1963–64
- Mason Wade, 1964–65
- Margaret Ormsby, 1965–66
- R. M. Saunders, 1966–67
- J. M. S. Careless, 1967–68
- P. B. Waite, 1968–69
- Fernand Ouellet, 1969–70
- W. R. Graham, 1970–71
- Ivo N. Lambi, 1971–72
- Lewis G. Thomas, 1972–73
- S. F. Wise, 1973–74
- J. B. Conacher, 1974–75
- Jacques Monet, 1975–76
- Margaret E. Prang, 1976–77
- David M. L. Farr, 1977–78
- Desmond Morton, 1978–79
- Robert C. Brown, 1979–80
- Pierre Savard, 1980–81
- John Kendle, 1981–82
- Jean-Pierre Wallot, 1982–83
- Ramsay Cook, 1983–84
- Susan M. Trofimenkoff, 1984–85
- William Acheson, 1985–86
- René Durocher, 1986–87
- H. Blair Neatby, 1987–88
- Cornelius J. Jaenen, 1988–89
- Jean-Claude Robert, 1989–90
- J. E. Rea, 1990–91
- Gail Cuthbert Brandt, 1991–92
- Phillip Buckner, 1992–93
- Veronica Strong-Boag, 1993–94
- James A. Leith, 1994–95
- Nadia Fahmy-Eid, 1995–96
- James R. Miller, 1996–97
- Judith Fingard, 1997–98
- Gregory Kealey, 1998–99
- Irving Abella, 1999-00
- Chad Gaffield, 2000–01
- Mary Vipond, 2001–03
- Gerald Friesen, 2003–05
- Margaret Conrad, 2005–07
- Craig Heron, 2007–09
- Mary Lynn Stewart, 2009–11
- Lyle Dick, 2011–13
- Dominique Marshall, 2013–15
- Joan Sangster, 2015–17
- Adele Perry, 2017–19
- Penny Bryden, 2019–21
- Steven High, 2021-23
- Donald Wright, 2023-25
- Colin M. Coates, 2025-

== See also ==
- List of Canadian historians
- Historiography of Canada
- List of learned societies
