= Canadian Centenary Series =

Canadian history series

- I Early Voyages and Northern Approaches, 1000–1632; II The Beginnings of New France, 1524–1663; III Canada Under Louis XIV, 1663–1701; IV New France, 1701–1744: A Supplement to Europe; V New France: The Last Phase, 1744–1760; VI Quebec, The Revolutionary Age 1760–1791; VII Upper Canada: The Formative Years 1784–1841; VIII Lower Canada, 1791–1840: Social Change and Nationalism; IX The Atlantic Provinces: The Emergence of Colonial Society, 1712–1857; X The Union of the Canadas: The Growth of Canadian Institutions, 1841–1857; XI The Fur Trade and the Northwest to 1857; XII The Critical Years: The Union of British North America, 1857–1873; XIII The Opening of the Canadian North, 1870–1914; XIV Canada 1874–1896: Arduous Destiny; XV Canada, 1896–1921: A Nation Transformed; XVI The Northward Expansion of Canada 1914–1967; XVII Canada 1922–1939: Decades of Discord; XVIII The Forked Road: Canada, 1939–1957; XIX Canada 1957–1967: The Years of Uncertainty and Innovation
- Edited by: W. L. Morton (Executive Editor, 1963–1980); Ramsay Cook (Executive Editor, 1980–1987); Donald Creighton (Advisory Editor, 1963–1979)
- Translator: Patricia Claxton (Vol. II)
- Country: Canada
- Language: English
- Discipline: Canadian history
- Publisher: McClelland & Stewart, Toronto (hardcover and paperback); Kindle Store (electronic)
- Published: 1963 (first volume) – 1987 (last volume)
- Media type: Hardcover; paperback; Amazon Kindle
- No. of books: 19

The Canadian Centenary Series is a nineteen-volume history of Canada published between 1963 and 1987 as an extended Canadian Centennial project. The collection resulted from the initiative of two of Canada's leading 20th century historians, W. L. Morton and D. G. Creighton. Morton served as the initial executive editor, and Creighton served as the advisory editor. The editors approached leading Canadian historians to write the individual volumes. The series was published by the Canadian publishing house, McClelland & Stewart.

One of the volumes, Lower Canada, 1791–1840: Social Change and Nationalism by Fernand Ouellette was also published in French and won the Governor General's Award for French language non-fiction. Another volume, Canada 1922–1939: Decades of Discord by John Herd Thompson and Alan Seager, was shortlisted for the 1985 Governor General's Award for English-language non-fiction.

== Structure of the series ==
The editors conceived the Centenary Series as a contribution to Canada's Centennial in 1967

In their general preface to each volume, Morton and Creighton explain that their goal is to have a series of volumes, covering the history of the regional communities which have made up the Canadian nation in its first century. As the general editors of the series, Morton and Creighton planned the general outline and the format. Each volume would be written by a specialist in that particular aspect of Canadian history, but using a common character and common method. Each volume would take a narrative approach, and deal in a balanced way with economic, social and political history. The editors hoped that this would take advantage of co-operative scholarship, while ensuring that each volume would have the unity and distinctive character of individual authorship. The goal was that each volume would be scholarly and readable, "at once useful to the student and of interest to the general reader." Each volume would be supported by detailed footnotes and a general bibliography.

== Developments in the series ==
The original plan for the series is indicated in the first volume to be published, Upper Canada: The Formative Years, 1784–1841. The editors initially envisaged seventeen volumes, with generic placeholder titles. As each author prepared their volume, the generic titles would be fleshed out. For example, the first volume went from the generic title "The North to 1632" to Early Voyages and Northern Approaches, 1000–1632.

As the series developed, there were some changes to the general plan. The projected volume "The North, 1670–1857" by E.E. Rich became The Fur Trade and the Northwest to 1857, while the projected volume "The North, 1870–1965" by Morris Zaslow became two volumes: The Opening of the Canadian North, 1870–1914 and The Northward Expansion of Canada 1914–1967. Similarly, the proposed final volume with the generic title "Epilogue, 1940–1967", with no author initially assigned, was split into two volumes: The Forked Road: Canada, 1939–1957 by Creighton himself, and Canada 1957–1967: The Years of Uncertainty and Innovation by Jack Granatstein.

There were also changes to some of the authors of the volumes. For example, the original plan was that Guy Frégault, a noted Quebec historian, would write two volumes: "New France, 1702–1743" and "New France, 1744–1760". However these two volumes were instead written by Dale Miquelon and George F. G. Stanley, respectively, presumably because Frégault was appointed the Deputy Minister of the Quebec Ministry of Cultural Affairs (1961–1966; 1970–1975). Similarly, P.B. Waite replaced J.T. Saywell for "Canada, 1874–1896"; Robert Craig Brown joined Ramsay Cook in writing "Canada, 1896–1921"; and John Herd Thompson and Alan Seager replaced F.W. Gibson as author of "Canada, 1922–1939".

The original plan was that the series would be completed by the Centennial year, 1967. Most of the pre-Confederation volumes were done by 1967, but of the post-Confederation volumes only Morton met this deadline. John Herd Thompson, himself one of the authors of a post-Confederation volume, jokingly commented that the delays were so lengthy that the series was in danger of becoming the "Canadian Bi-Centenary series". The final volume to be published, New France, 1701–1744: A Supplement to Europe by Dale Miquelon, did not appear until 1987, although it was the fourth volume in terms of chronology.

The series was not completed by the time of the deaths of the two original editors, Creighton in 1979 and Morton in 1980. Ramsay Cook took over as executive editor in 1983, at the request of Jack McClelland, president of McClelland & Stewart.

Each volume in the series was initially published in hard-bound versions, followed by paperback versions. As of 2025, the entire series is available from Amazon as Kindle editions.

== Individual volumes ==
=== Early Voyages and Northern Approaches, 1000–1632 ===
Written by Tryggvi J. Oleson, a Manitoba historian of Icelandic descent, Early Voyages and Northern Approaches was the second volume to be published, in 1963. Oleson examined two different aspects of European exploration of the Canadian Arctic: by the Norse settlers of western Greenland, and later by other Northern European explorers, mainly from England, who were searching for the North-West Passage.

Oleson's primary thesis was that the Thule culture of the High Arctic was a fusion of the Norse culture from Greenland and the indigenous Dorset culture. In support of this thesis, Oleson relied on his interpretation of archaeological evidence, such as the structure of stone shelters in the Eastern Arctic which he saw as similar to Icelandic structures; the development of a sea-culture including whaling from small boats, which he saw as similar to Norse practices; and a body of academic historical research from Icelandic scholars, which was not generally available to Canadian researchers. He also relied on the Norse sagas, which have several descriptions of encounters between Norse and indigenous peoples of the Arctic. This thesis also had the advantage of explaining the gradual disappearance of the Norse settlements on Greenland. In Oleson's view, the Norse did not simply disappear or die out; they fused with the indigenous people of the Dorset culture.

Oleson's theories attracted considerable academic criticism. Several reviews of the book were critical of this thesis, arguing that it went against the archaeological evidence. The prevailing interpretation was that the Thule culture had its origins in Alaska and had moved eastward. Oleson's thesis was that the Thule originated in the eastern Arctic and gradually moved westward. Several reviewers challenged Oleson's interpretation, particularly William Taylor, who was one of the leading experts in Arctic archaeology at the National Museum of Canada, as well as Wilcomb E. Washburn from the Smithsonian Institution. The one contemporary review which was more favourable was from Thomas E. Lee, another archaeologist from the National Museum of Canada, who wrote that he had read Oleson's "tremendous work" six times, cover to cover, and thought it was "...by far the most important and instructive single work to come out of Arctic research in this field in recent times." More recently, there has been some favourable re-examination of Oleson's thesis, emphasizing his careful scholarship and reliance on works in Icelandic which were not accessible to most Canadian academics.

The criticism of Oleson's thesis, particularly its sometimes personal tone, appears to have caught the general editors of the Centenary Series by surprise. They were also hampered in responding to the criticism by the untimely death of Oleson shortly after Early Voyages and Northern Approaches was published. In response, when the text was re-issued some five years later, the general editors included extracts from some of the criticisms as a forward, but did not alter Oleson's text at all.

=== The Beginnings of New France, 1524–1663 ===
The Beginnings of New France was written by Marcel Trudel, a Quebec historian in French, and translated by Patricia Claxton. Published in 1973, it was the first volume of the series to appear which dealt with the history of New France.

Trudel was one of the first specialists in the history of New France prior to the British Conquest, and this volume is a condensation of three of his earlier texts: Les vaines tentatives, 1524–1603; Le comptoir, 1604–1627; La seigneurie des Cent-Associés, 1627–1663. It also drew on data from two of his other books, Le terrier du Saint-Laurent en 1663, which examined the land settlement patterns under the seigneurial system, and La population du Canada en 1663. Overall, the thesis of the volume is the difficulties which France had in establishing a colony in North America, particularly compared to the successes of the English and Dutch colonies in the same period. Part of the difficulty was in finding an appropriate area of settlement, both in Acadia and in the Saint Lawrence valley, but another part was the economic basis for the colonies. There was a continual tension between the economy based on the fur trade, and the attempts to establish permanent settlements. The initial attempts at colonial settlement relied on a succession of grants of rights to the fur trade to commercial groups, with an added requirement to bring in settlers (habitants). However, the immediate profits from the fur trade always tended to take priority for the commercial groups over the costly, and not profitable, requirement to bring settlers to the new colonies. Even by the end of the period of the book, the numbers of French settlers in New France were very low, compared to the other European colonies.

Trudel also explores in detail the relations with the Indians (First Nations). He makes it clear that they were not simply passive traders with the French, and explores the various economic conflicts between the different Indian groups, who all wanted to control the fur trade with the French and the profits it would bring. The economic interests of the various Indian tribes hampered French attempts at exploration. The Indian tribes which acted as middlemen in the fur trade realised that if the French were to explore the upper reaches of the Saint Lawrence and the Great Lakes, they would be able to make contact with the tribes of those areas and trade directly with them. The economic conflicts over the fur trade also led to military conflicts between the different Indian tribes, which resulted in the Iroquois in particular being in constant conflict with the French and the Hurons of the Great Lakes region. The conflict, known as the Beaver Wars, resulted in an Iroquois victory, and the Hurons fleeing from their homeland in the Great Lakes area to new settlements near the town of Quebec.

Trudel also explores the religious history of New France, coupled with the development of civil government. He concludes that the primary reason that the French government emphasised missionary work in New France was to bolster its claims to support from the papacy against other European powers which were colonising North America. He also reviews the sporadic growth in civil government, and concludes that even at the end of the period of his volume, civil government was not well-established.

The volume ends with a major change in French colonial policy. The government of the young Louis XIV and his main minister, Jean-Baptiste Colbert, ends the monopoly of the last of the trading companies, the Compagnie des Cent-Associés (Company of one Hundred Associates), and assumes direct governance of the colony.

Given Trudel's stature amongst the historians of New France, the volume appears to have been well received. One reviewer commented that Trudel's pattern of opposing the different interests of individuals and groups served to illustrate some of the difficulties of the colonial efforts, but perhaps masked some of the larger economical and political reasons for the uncertain progress of the French colony, such as the weakness of French maritime power; the number of enemies France had in Europe, which made it difficult for the French settlements to develop in peace; and the impossibility of establishing a monopoly over the fur trade, given the large number of competitors. The same reviewer took issue with Trudel's conclusion that by the end of the period under study, New France was still largely a rural population.

=== Canada Under Louis XIV, 1663–1701 ===
Written by W. J. Eccles, Canada Under Louis XIV, 1663–1701 deals with the crucial period when the royal government of Louis XIV took over the management of the colony. New to the throne, Louis XIV cancelled the charter of the Company of 100 Associates and made New France into a royal province, under his direct rule. The colony was not large, especially compared to the growing English colonies to the south, and was not strong economically. It was small in size, along the St. Lawrence River. By the end-point of the volume, 1701, New France was well-established as a continental empire. Acadia had been regained and the French had explored the Great Lakes and down the Mississippi, establishing a much greater presence in the fur trade.

Louis was prepared to put considerable economic and military resources into the development of the colony, which was under the supervision of his able minister, Jean-Baptiste Colbert.

=== Subsequent volumes ===
- New France, 1701–1744: A Supplement to Europe by Dale Miquelon, an historian from Saskatchewan. It was originally planned to be written by Guy Frégault, a Quebec historian. It was the last volume to be published, in 1987.
- New France: The Last Phase, 1744–1760, by George F. G. Stanley. It was also originally planned to be written by Guy Frégault.
- Quebec, The Revolutionary Age 1760–1791, by Hilda Neatby, a Saskatchewanian historian. It was published in both English and French.
- Upper Canada: The Formative Years 1784–1841, by Gerald M. Craig, was the first to be published.
- Lower Canada, 1791–1840: Social Change and Nationalism, by Fernand Ouellet; published in French as Le Bas-Canada 1791–1840 — Changements structuraux et crise; winner of Governor General's Literary Award for French Language Non-Fiction in 1976.
- The Atlantic Provinces: The Emergence of Colonial Society, 1712–1857, by William Stewart MacNutt.
- The Union of the Canadas: The Growth of Canadian Institutions, 1841–1857 by J. M. S. Careless.
- The Fur Trade and the Northwest to 1857, the only one written by a non-Canadian. Edwin Ernest Rich was an English historian who specialized in the economic history of the British Empire.
- The Critical Years: The Union of British North America, 1857–1873 by William Lewis Morton, the first executive editor of the series.
- The Opening of the Canadian North, 1870–1914 by Morris Zaslow. It was originally planned as a single volume covering the century from 1867 to 1967, but grew too large for one volume and was split into two.
- Canada 1874–1896: Arduous Destiny by Peter Busby Waite, a Nova Scotian historian who specialized in the Confederation period. Waite replaced J.T. Saywell, who was originally planned to be the author of this volume.
- Canada, 1896–1921: A Nation Transformed by Robert Craig Brown and Ramsay Cook. It was originally planned that Cook alone would be the author.
- The Northward Expansion of Canada 1914–1967, the second volume on the north, written by Morris Zaslow.
- Canada 1922–1939: Decades of Discord, originally intended to be written by F.W. Gibson, but John Herd Thompson and Alan Seager were substituted as authors. It was one of the last volumes to be published, in 1985. It was shortlisted for the Governor-General's Award in the English non-fiction category for that year.
- The Forked Road: Canada, 1939–1957, by the advisory editor to the series, Donald Creighton. It was originally to be one volume, covering the period from 1940 to 1967, tentatively entitled "Epilogue", but it was split into two.
- Canada 1957–1967: The Years of Uncertainty and Innovation, the second volume from the split of the proposed "Epilogue" volume. Written by Jack Granatstein, it was one of the last to be published, in 1986.
