= Canadian Forum =

Canadian magazine

The Canadian Forum
- Categories: Literary; political
- Format: Magazine
- Publisher: Canadian Forum Limited
- Founded: 1920; 106 years ago
- Final issue: 2000; 26 years ago
- Country: Canada
- Language: English
- ISSN: 0008-3631
- OCLC: 1553097

The Canadian Forum was a literary, cultural and political publication and Canada's longest running continually published political magazine (1920–2000).

== History and profile ==
The Canadian Forum, A Monthly Journal of Literature and Public Affairs, was founded on 14 May 1920 by Barker Fairley at the University of Toronto as a forum for political and cultural ideas. Its first directors were G. E. Jackson, chairman, Barker Fairley, literary editor, C. B. Sissons, political editor, Peter Sandiford, business manager and Huntly Gordon, press editor. Throughout its publishing run it was Canadian nationalist and progressive in outlook.

Politically, it was a forum for thinkers such as Frank Underhill, F. R. Scott, Ramsay Cook, Mel Watkins, John Alan Lee, Eugene Forsey and Robert Fulford. Poetry and short stories by Irving Layton, Earle Birney, A. J. M. Smith, Helen Weinzweig, Margaret Atwood, Al Purdy and E. J. Pratt, appeared as well as editorials, reviews and articles discussing art and artists, sometimes written by the artists themselves, such as A. Y. Jackson, or Lawren Harris. J. E. H. MacDonald and Bertram Brooker even contributed their poetry. From 1928 on, critic Robert Ayre began to contribute reviews.

The Forum prided itself on reproducing a picture by a Canadian artist in each issue, "selected by competent critics", though leaning towards the progressive side in art, at least in the early years. Art editors included Pegi Nicol MacLeod. Among the artists who lent their work to the publication the most often used was Thoreau MacDonald but a pen sketch by Tom Thomson (now lost) also appeared. It published the art work of the Group of Seven and many other artists in black-and-white, one work per issue. The full range of the artists published in the Forum was discussed in the Fiftieth Anniversary issue in a lengthy article by the then art editor (1970-1975) Joan Murray.

In 1934, publisher Steven Cartwright purchased the periodical from J.M. Dent & Sons. After owning it for about a year, Cartwright unloaded the money-losing venture for one dollar to Graham Spry a member of the socially progressive think tank the League for Social Reconstruction (LSR). It was printed using Spy's printing press company, Stafford Printers, which also printed the Ontario CCF's newspaper The New Commonwealth. Spry purchased the press with financial help from both the LSR and English socialist Sir Stafford Cripps, hence the name Stafford Press. in 1936, the LSR bought the Forum for one-dollar from Spry, and assumed all its debts. University of Toronto Classics professor George Grube, a member of the LSR, became the editor in 1937. During his tenure, the periodical was the LSR's official organ. Grube stepped down as editor in 1941, about a year before the LSR officially disbanded. It has also been operated at times as a co-operative and was owned for a number of years by James Lorimer and Co.

Editors have included Mark Farrell, G. M. A. Grube, J. Francis White, Northrop Frye, Milton Wilson, Abraham Rotstein, Denis Smith and the final editor Duncan Cameron.

The magazine suspended publication following its summer 2000 issue. The Canadian Forum Archives (1953–1978) is at Trent University Library and Archives in Peterborough, Ontario.
