= J. B. Tyrrell Historical Medal =

Canadian history award

The J. B. Tyrrell Historical Medal is an award of the Royal Society of Canada "for outstanding work in the history of Canada." It was established in 1927, endowed by the Canadian geologist and amateur historian Joseph Burr Tyrrell. The medal is awarded every two years if there is a suitable candidate. The award consists of a gold plated silver medal.

== Recipients ==
- 2024 - Steven High
- 2022 - Afua Cooper
- 2020 - Allan Greer, FRSC
- 2018 - William Waiser, FRSC
- 2016 - Michael Behiels, FRSC
- 2014 - Gerald Friesen, FRSC
- 2012 - Veronica Strong-Boag, FRSC
- 2010 - Robert Bothwell, FRSC
- 2006 - H. V. Nelles
- 2004 - Chad Gaffield
- 2002 - David Bercuson
- 2000 - Joy Parr, FRSC
- 1998 - Jean-Claude Robert, MSRC
- 1996 - Yves Roby, MSRC
- 1994 - Cornelius J. Jaenen, FRSC
- 1992 - Jack L. Granatstein, FRSC
- 1990 - Hubert Charbonneau, MSRC et Jacques Légaré
- 1988 - J. Michael Bliss, FRSC
- 1986 - John W. Holmes, FRSC
- 1984 - Carl Berger, FRSC
- 1982 - Jean-Pierre Wallot, MSRC
- 1979 - W. J. Eccles
- 1975 - George Ramsay Cook, FRSC
- 1972 - Jean Hamelin, FRSC
- 1970 - Fernand Ouellet, FRSC
- 1968 - Gerald William L. Nicholson
- 1966 - Edgar McInnis
- 1965 - W. Kaye Lamb, FRSC
- 1964 - Marcel Trudel
- 1963 - Frank H. Underhill, FRSC
- 1962 - James Maurice S. Careless, FRSC
- 1961 - Guy Frégault
- 1960 - Samuel Delbert Clark, FRSC
- 1959 - Arthur Maheux
- 1958 - William Lewis Morton, FRSC
- 1957 - George F.G. Stanley, FRSC
- 1956 - Olivier Maurault, MSRC
- 1955 - Charles Perry Stacey, FRSC
- 1954 - G.P. de T. Glazebrook
- 1953 - Séraphin Marion, MSRC
- 1952 - Charles Bruce Sissons, FRSC
- 1951 - Jean Bruchési, MSRC
- 1951 - Donald Grant Creighton, FRSC
- 1950 - John Bartlet Brebner
- 1949 - Reginald G. Trotter, FRSC
- 1948 - Lionel Groulx, MSRC
- 1947 - Arthur R.M. Lower, FRSC
- 1946 - A. LeRoy Burt
- 1945 - Fred Landon, FRSC
- 1944 - Harold Adam Innis, FRSC
- 1943 - Gustave Lanctot, MSRC
- 1942 - D. C. Harvey, FRSC
- 1941 - Arthur Silver Morton, FRSC
- 1940 - Chester Martin, FRSC
- 1939 - Édouard-Zotique Massicotte, MSRC
- 1938 - William Wood, FRSC
- 1937 - Aegidius Fauteux, MSRC
- 1936 - W. Stewart Wallace, FRSC
- 1935 - Ernest Alexander Cruikshank, FRSC
- 1934 - John Clarence Webster, FRSC
- 1933 - Frederick W. Howay, FRSC
- 1932 - Pierre-Georges Roy, FRSC
- 1931 - Lawrence J. Burpee, FRSC
- 1930 - Adam Shortt, FRSC
- 1929 - George Mackinnon Wrong, FRSC
- 1928 - Thomas Chapais, FRSC

== See also ==
- List of history awards
