= Glazebrook (disambiguation) =

Glazebrook can refer to:

- Glazebrook, a village near Warrington in Cheshire, England
  - Glazebrook railway station
  - Rixton-with-Glazebrook, English civil parish
- 10099 Glazebrook, an outer main-belt asteroid named after Karl Glazebrook

People with surname Glazebrook

- Glazebrook (surname)

== See also ==
- Glaze Brook, a river in the North West of England
