= Marcel Martel =

Marcel Martel may refer to:

- Marcel Martel (musician) (1925–1999), French Canadian singer-songwriter and composer
- Marcel Martel (historian), French Canadian historian
