= Michael D. Behiels =

Canadian historian

Michael D. Behiels FRSC
- Born: Michael Derek Behiels; 1946 (age 79–80)

Academic background
- Education: University of Alberta; York University
- Thesis: Prelude to Quebec's "Quiet Revolution" (1978)
- Doctoral advisor: Ramsay Cook
- Influences: Michael Kelway Oliver

Academic work
- Discipline: History
- Sub-discipline: Canadian political history
- Institutions: Acadia University; University of Ottawa

Michael Derek Behiels FRSC (born 1946) is a Canadian historian who served as a professor and University Research Chair in the Department of History at the University of Ottawa, specializing in twentieth-century Canadian politics. A student of Ramsay Cook, he is a prominent defender of Pierre Trudeau's conception of federalism: no special status for Quebec and maintenance of linguistic minority rights. In 1985, while a faculty member at Acadia University, his published doctoral dissertation Prelude to Quebec's Quiet Revolution was nominated for the Governor General's Award for English-language non-fiction. Thanks to this book's success, he is still considered to be a major authority on the thought of former Le Devoir editor André Laurendeau.

He frequently appears in the media to comment on current events, most notably on CPAC's weekly call-in show Goldhawk Live.

Behiels in 2010 has argued that Canada has recently undergone a political realignment, of the sort that occurs rarely and makes a long term shift in the political alignment of the parties. The patterns of the 2004, 2006, and 2008 elections and the continuance of Harper's government, argues Behiels, has led many of Canada's political experts to the conclusion that a new political party paradigm has emerged. Behiels says they find its basis in a right-wing political party capable of reconfiguring the role of the state – federal and provincial – in twenty-first-century.

In 2011, he was made a Fellow of the Royal Society of Canada.

== Bibliography ==
- The Essential Laurendeau, ed. (1976);
- Prelude to Quebec's Quiet Revolution (1985);
- Quebec Since 1945, ed. (1987);
- The Meech Lake Primer ed. (1989);
- Canada: Its Regions and People (1998);
- Futures and Identities: Aboriginal Peoples in Canada ed. (1999);
- Essays in Honour of Ramsay Cook co-ed with Marcel Martel (2000);
- Canada's Francophone Minority Communities (2003)

== See also ==
- Canadian federalism

Awards
Preceded by Gerald Friesen	J. B. Tyrrell Historical Medal; 2016	Succeeded by Bill Waiser
