= Lawrence Kirk =

Canadian agronomist

- Born: Lawrence Eldred Kirk; 27 May 1887; Bracebridge, Ontario, Canada
- Died: 27 November 1969 (aged 83); Saskatoon, Saskatchewan, Canada
- Occupation: agronomist
- Awards: Order of Canada

Lawrence Eldred Kirk, SM (27 May 1886 – 27 November 1969) was a Canadian agronomist best known for introducing crested wheatgrass to Canada and helping to control the Dust Bowl in the 1930s.

Born in Bracebridge, Ontario, he received a Bachelor of Arts degree in 1916, a Bachelor of Science degree in 1917, and a Master of Science in agriculture in 1922 from the University of Saskatchewan. In 1927, he received a Doctor of Philosophy from the University of Minnesota.

From 1917 to 1919, he was an instructor in agronomy at the University of Saskatchewan. From 1919 to 1920, he taught agriculture at Moose Jaw Collegiate. From 1920 to 1931, he was a Professor of Field Husbandry at University of Saskatchewan. In 1931, he was appointed Dominion Agrostologist and Head of the Division of Forage Crops of the Experimental Farms Service in Ottawa, Ontario. In 1937, he was appointed Dean of the College of Agriculture at the University of Saskatchewan. In 1947, he became Chief of the Plant Industry Branch in the Agricultural Division of the Food and Agriculture Organization of the United Nations in Rome. He retired in 1955.

In 1968, he was awarded the Medal of Service (S.M.) of the Order of Canada "for his service in various branches of agriculture at home and abroad". In 1949, he was awarded an honorary Doctor of Laws from the University of Saskatchewan.
