= Franca Iacovetta =

Canadian historian

- Born: 1957 (age 68–69)

Academic background
- Education: York University
- Thesis: Working-Class Immigrants (1988)
- Doctoral advisor: Ramsay Cook

Academic work
- Discipline: History
- School or tradition: Feminism
- Institutions: University of Toronto

Franca Iacovetta (born 1957) is a historian of labour and migration currently working at the University of Toronto.

Her dissertation, published as Such Hardworking People: Italian Immigrants in Postwar Toronto, was supervised by York University's Ramsay Cook. She has since edited numerous collections of case studies, examining the lives of so-called "marginalized peoples" in Canada and the United States. Her most recent book Gatekeepers was awarded the Canadian Historical Association's John A. Macdonald Prize in 2008.

She has been critical of J. L. Granatstein, who questioned the dominance of social history in recent Canadian historical-writing in Who Killed Canadian History?, calling it a "clearly offensive", "ill-conceived little book".

== Selected bibliography ==
- Such Hardworking People: Italian Immigrants in Postwar Toronto (MQUP 1992)
- Enemies Within: Italian and Other Wartime Internments in Canada and Beyond, co-ed with R. Perin and A. Principe (UTP 2000)
- Women, Gender and Transnational Lives: Italy's Workers of the World, co-ed with D. Gabaccia (UTP 2002)
- Sisters or Strangers?: Immigrant, Ethnic and Racialized Women in Canadian History, co-ed with M. Epp and F. Swyripa (Toronto 2003);
- Gatekeepers: Reshaping Immigrant Lives in Cold War Canada (Toronto, 2006) ISBN 9781897071113
