= Massicotte =

Massicotte is a surname. Notable people with the surname include:

- Édouard-Zotique Massicotte (1867–1947), Canadian historian
- Georges Massicotte (1930–2020), Canadian politician, Quebec MNA
- Paul Massicotte (born 1951), Canadian politician, Quebec senator
- Stephen Massicotte (born 1969), Canadian playwright

== See also ==
- Massicot
