= Leslie Francis Stokes Upton =

English and Canadian historian (1931–1980)

- Born: 8 December 1931; England
- Died: 29 March 1980 (aged 48); Vancouver, Canada
- Other names: L. F. S. Upton, Leslie F. S. Upton
- Education: St. John's College, Oxford (BA); University of Minnesota
- Occupations: Historian, author, educator, researcher
- Employer: University of British Columbia

Leslie Francis Stokes Upton, also known as Leslie F. S. Upton, (8 December 1931 – 29 March 1980) was an English and Canadian historian, researcher, educator, and author. He specialized in the history of the American Revolutionary War and the Loyalists.

== Early life and education ==
Leslie Francis Stokes Upton was born on 8 December 1931, in England.

Upton graduating with an honors Bachelor of Arts degree in history from St John's College, Oxford, a constituent college of the University of Oxford in England; and a Ph.D. in 1957 from the University of Minnesota, where he focused his study on American colonial history and studied under Alfred Leroy Burt.

== Career ==
He started as a professor of history at the University of British Columbia in 1964, also serving at St. John's College in Winnipeg for seven years of his career. He served as an assistant professor at the St. Johns College. During his time as a professor, he engaged in research on American colonial history, centered around loyalists and the nature and development of the English Canadian cultural identity.

His last book, Micmacs and colonists: Indian-White relations in the Maritimes, was published in 1979, at the end of his life.

Upton died of cancer on 29 March 1980, in Vancouver. An obituary was published in the Canadian Historical Association's newsletter in both English and French.

== Publications ==
He is the author of a number of books, journal articles, and academic manuscripts, including:

- Upton, L. F. S. (1957). William Smith, Chief Justice of New York and Quebec, 1728–93 (PhD thesis). University of Minnesota.
- Upton, L. F. S., ed. (1965). The Diary and Selected Papers of Chief Justice William Smith, 1784–1793. Volume II, The Diary, October 6, 1785 to May 18, 1787; Selected Papers, 1785 to 1793. Vol. XLII. Toronto, Canada: Champlain Society. pp. xli, 335.
- Upton, L. F. S. (1967). The United Empire Loyalists: Men and Myths. Issues in Canadian History. Toronto, Canada: Copp Clark Publishing Company.
- Upton, Leslie Francis Stokes (1968). Revolutionary Versus Loyalist: The First American Civil War, 1774–1784. Waltham, Massachusetts: Blaisdell Pub. Co.
- Upton, Leslie F. (1969). The Loyal Whig: William Smith of New York & Quebec. University of Toronto Press. ISBN 0802052061.
- Upton, L. F. S. (October 10, 1976). "Indians and Islanders: The Micmacs in Colonial Prince Edward Island". Acadiensis: 21–21. ISSN 1712-7432.
- Upton, Leslie Francis Stokes (1979). Micmacs and Colonists: Indian-White Relations in the Maritimes, 1713–1867. Vancouver, Canada: University of British Columbia Press. ISBN 978-0-7748-0114-0.
