= Francis-Joseph Audet =

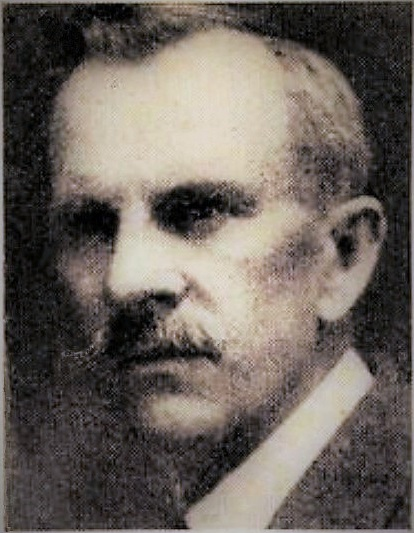

Francis-Joseph Audet, FRSC (July 29, 1867 Detroit – September 13, 1954) was an American-born Canadian historian and archivist.

Audet was President of the Canadian Historical Association for 1934–1935.

His archive is held at Canadiana.
