= Chester W. New =

Canadian historian (1882–1960)

Chester William New, FRSC (9 October 1882 – 31 August 1960) was a Canadian historian, known for his biographies of Lord Durham and Henry Brougham.

New was educated at the University of Toronto, McMaster University, and the University of Chicago, having also been ordained a Baptist minister before his graduate studies. He taught at Brandon College from 1913 and McMaster University from 1920 to 1950, where he was Professor of History and sometime head of the Department of History.

Elected a fellow of the Royal Society of Canada in 1937, New was President of the Canadian Historical Association from 1936 to 1937.

He was the Progressive Conservative candidate for Hamilton West in the 1945 Canadian federal election.
