= Alfred Leroy Burt =

Canadian historian (1888–1971)

Alfred Leroy Burt, FRSC (November 28, 1888 – June 21, 1971) was a Canadian historian. He had a particular interest in the relationship between French and English Canada, Burt was professor of history at the University of Alberta in Edmonton, then at the University of Minnesota from 1930 to 1957. One of his former students at the University of Minnesota was historian Leslie Francis Stokes Upton.

Alfred Leroy Burt was born on November 28, 1888, in Listowel, Ontario, Canada. He was educated at the University of Toronto, and the University of Oxford, where he was a Rhodes scholar.

A fellow of the Royal Society of Canada, Burt won its J. B. Tyrrell Historical Medal in 1946. He was also president of the Canadian Historical Association.

== Works ==
- Imperial Architects, (1913)
- A Short History Of The League Of Nations, (1924)
- High School Civics, (1928)
- The Romance Of The Prairie Provinces, (1930)
- Guy Carleton, Lord Dorchester, 1724-1808, (1930)
- The Old Province Of Quebec, (1933)
- The Romance Of Canada, (1937)
- The United States, Great Britain, And British North America..., (1940)
- A Short History Of Canada For Americans, (1942/1944)
- The United States And Its Place In World Affairs [with ?], (1943)
- The Evolution Of The British Empire...The American Revolution, (1956)
