= Ramsay Cook =

Canadian historian (1931–2016)

Ramsay Cook OC FRSC
- Born: George Ramsay Cook; 28 November 1931; Alameda, Saskatchewan, Canada
- Died: 14 July 2016 (aged 84); Toronto, Ontario, Canada
- Spouse: Eleanor Cook

Academic background
- Education: United College; Queen's University; University of Toronto
- Doctoral advisor: Donald Creighton
- Other advisor: Arthur R. M. Lower

Academic work
- Discipline: History
- Sub-discipline: Canadian history; social history
- Institutions: University of Toronto; York University
- Doctoral students: Michael D. Behiels; Michael Bliss; Michiel Horn; Franca Iacovetta; Marcel Martel

George Ramsay Cook OC FRSC (28 November 1931 – 14 July 2016) was a Canadian historian and general editor of the Dictionary of Canadian Biography. He was professor of history at the University of Toronto, 1958–1968; York University, 1969–1996; Visiting Professor of Canadian Studies, Harvard University, 1968–1969; Visiting Professor, and Yale University, 1978–1979 and 1997. Through his championing of so-called "limited identities", Cook contributed to the rise of the New Social History, which uses "class, gender and ethnicity" as its three main categories of analysis. Cook's conception of "limited identities" was famously formulated in an article in the International Journal in 1967, Canada's centenary year, reviewing the state of contemporary scholarship on Canadian nationalism:

After six new books on the great Canadian problem — our lack of unity and identity — are we getting any nearer the source of the problem? Undoubtedly something is achieved: if nothing else one can wonder if the search is worth the effort. Certainly we should continue to try to understand ourselves; an unexamined nation is not worth living in. But it may be that the frame of reference is wrong. Perhaps instead of constantly deploring our lack of identity, we should attempt to understand and explain the regional, ethnic and class identities that we do have. It might just be that it is in these limited identities that "Canadianism" is found, and that except for our over-heated nationalist intellectuals, Canadians find this situation quite satisfactory.

During his teaching career, Cook supervised the work of 39 PhD students and many prominent social historians such as Franca Iacovetta.

In 1997, the Ramsay Cook Research Scholarship was established at York University to honour his contribution to the field of history.

He publicly supported Pierre Elliott Trudeau in his successful attempt to gain the leadership of the Liberal Party of Canada in 1968.

He was married to Eleanor Cook, an English professor at the University of Toronto.

== Honours ==
Cook received the Governor General's Award for non-fiction in 1985 for The Regenerators: Social Criticism in Late Victorian English Canada. He is a Fellow of the Royal Society of Canada and was made an Officer of the Order of Canada in 1986. He was awarded the Order of the Sacred Treasure by the Japanese government in 1994. In 2005, Cook received the Molson Prize in Social Sciences and Humanities.

== Selected works ==
- The Politics of John W. Dafoe and the Free Press, 1963.
- Canada and the French Canadian Question, 1966.
- The Maple Leaf Forever: Essays on Nationalism and Politics in Canada, 1971.
- Canada 1896–1921: A Nation Transformed, with Robert Craig Brown, 1975. (Part of The Canadian Centenary Series.)
- The Regenerators: Social Criticism in Late Victorian English Canada, 1985.
- Canada, Quebec and the Uses of Nationalism, 1986.
- The Teeth of Time, Remembering Pierre Elliot Trudeau, 2006.

Professional and academic associations
Preceded by Jean-Pierre Wallot	President of the Canadian Historical Association; 1983–1984	Succeeded by Susan Mann
Awards
Preceded by Jean Hamelin	J. B. Tyrrell Historical Medal; 1975	Succeeded by W. J. Eccles
Preceded by Maria Campbell	Molson Prize; 2005; With: Iain Baxter&	Succeeded by Nicole Brossard
Preceded by Richard Tremblay	Molson Prize; 2005; With: Iain Baxter&	Succeeded by Henry Mintzberg
