= Hilda Neatby =

Canadian historian and educator (1904–1975)

- Born: Hilda Ada Marion Neatby; February 19, 1904; Sutton, England, UK
- Died: May 14, 1975 (aged 71); Saskatoon, Saskatchewan, Canada
- Education: University of Saskatchewan; University of Minnesota; University of Paris
- Scientific career
- Workplaces: University of Saskatchewan

Hilda Marion Ada Neatby CC (February 19, 1904 – May 14, 1975) was a Canadian historian and educator.

== Early life and education ==
Hilda Marion Ada Neatby was born on February 19, 1904, in Sutton (then in Surrey), to Andrew Neatby and Ada Fisher. The family moved to Saskatchewan when Hilda was 2. She received a BA and MA from the University of Saskatchewan and a PhD from the University of Minnesota. She taught history at the University of Saskatchewan and was head of the history department from 1958 to 1969. Fluent in French, she studied at the Sorbonne in Paris.

== Career ==
In 1966, she published Quebec, The Revolutionary Age 1760–1791, part of The Canadian Centenary Series. The book examined the transitional events between 1760 and 1791 in the province of Quebec following victory by British forces over the French Army and the decision made by Louis XV to hand over Quebec to the British in the 1763 Treaty of Paris that ended the Seven Years' War.

From 1949 to 1951 she was the only female member of the Royal Commission on National Development in the Arts, Letters and Sciences, which recommended the establishment of the Canada Council.

Her book So Little for the Mind (1953) criticized contemporary reforms in the Canadian educational system that were based on John Dewey’s philosophical ideas.

In 1969, the board of trustees at Queen's University in Kingston, Ontario, commissioned Neatby to write the history of that institution. Queen's University, Volume I, 1841-1917: And Not to Yield was published in 1978, after her death.

Neatby died in Saskatoon on May 14, 1975.

== Awards and honours ==
In 1967, Neatby was made a companion of the Order of Canada. In 1953, she received an honorary degree from the University of Toronto. Since 1982, the Canadian Historical Association has awarded the Hilda Neatby Prize for works on women's history. In 2000, Canada Post issued a stamp in her honour. In 2005, the former Place Riel Theatre (a former cinema, later converted into a lecture theatre) at the University of Saskatchewan was renamed the Neatby-Timlin Theatre, in honour of her and former economics professor Mabel Timlin.

== Bibliography ==
- So Little for the Mind (1953)
- Neatby, Hilda (April 1955). "The Challenge of Education to the Christian Church" (PDF). The Canadian Journal of Theology. I (1): 35–43.
- Quebec, The Revolutionary Age 1760–1791 (1966)
- The Quebec Act: Protest and Policy (1972)
- Queen's University, Volume 1: 1841–1917: To Strive, to Seek, to Find, and Not to Yield (1978)
- So Much to Do, So Little Time-the Writings of Hilda Neatby (1983)

== Works cited ==
- Kuffert, Leonard B. (2003). A Great Duty: Canadian Responses to Modern Life and Mass Culture in Canada, 1939–1967. McGill–Queen's University Press. ISBN 978-0-7735-2600-6.
