= Edmond-Joseph Massicotte =

Canadian artist (1875–1929)

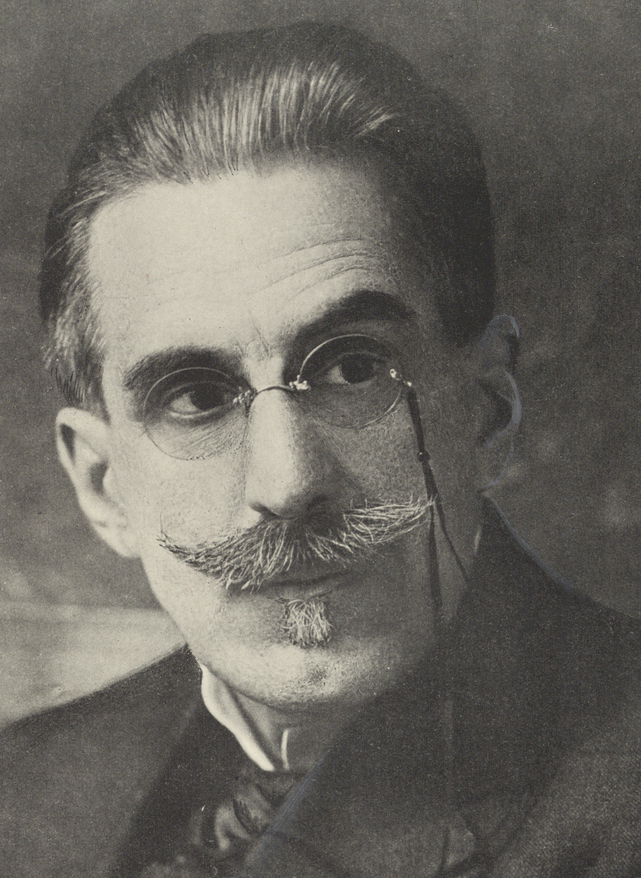
- Born: December 1, 1875; Sainte-Cunégonde, Montreal, Quebec
- Died: March 1, 1929 (aged 53); Montreal, Quebec
- Education: Council of Arts and Manufactures
- Notable work: Nos Canadiens d'autrefois
- Spouse: Aldine Émond (m. 1914)
- Children: 1

Edmond-Joseph Massicotte (baptized Joseph-Edmond; December 1, 1875 – March 1, 1929) was a Canadian artist in Quebec.

== Early life and education ==
Massicotte was born in Sainte-Cunégonde, Montreal. He was the son of Édouard Massicotte, a shoemaker, and Adèle Massicotte (née Bertrand). He was the brother of historian and journalist Édouard-Zotique Massicotte. Edmonad and Édouard were educated at the Council of Arts and Manufactures in Montreal.

== Career ==
During his studies, Massicotte was tutored by Edmond Dyonnet. He continued studying until 1895. He continued his apprenticeship with William Brymner at the Art Association of Montreal. He worked for the French satirical newspaper Le Canard from 1896 to 1898 as a caricaturist. Massicotte published the Nos Canadiens d'autrefois in 1923, which consists of 12 compositions created by him.

== Personal life ==
Massicotte married Aldine Émond in 1914. They had one daughter.

He died on March 1, 1929 in Montreal, Quebec, aged 53.
