= Fred Landon =

Canadian journalist (1880-1969)

- Born: November 5, 1880; London, Ontario
- Died: August 1, 1969 (aged 88); London, Ontario
- Occupations: Professor, historian
- Spouse: Margaret Smith (m. 1914)
- Writing career
- Period: 20th century
- Genre: History

Fred Landon FRSC (November 5, 1880 – August 1, 1969) was a Canadian journalist, historian, librarian, teacher, administrator and specialist in Ontario history.

== Biography ==
He was born in London, Ontario in 1880 and died there in 1969. He married twice. Landon graduated from the University of Western Ontario in 1906. For ten years he worked as a journalist for the London Free Press. In 1916 he became chief librarian at the London Public Library where he established a local history collection.

After completing his M.A. in history at the University of Western Ontario, Landon was appointed the university's first full-time librarian in 1923, a position he held until 1946 when he became university vice-president and dean of graduate studies. Professor James J. Talman replaced Landon as university librarian. He received the Royal Society of Canada's J. B. Tyrrell Historical Medal in 1945. Landon retired in 1950, and in that year was awarded honorary doctorates by UWO and McMaster University.

Landon made a significant contribution to the historiography of Ontario, particularly that of southwestern Ontario, with a focus on social history. In his view, "Without social history, economic history is barren, and political history is unintelligible."

Landon was also a member of the interracial board of London's civil right organization - the Canadian League for the Advancement of Coloured People.

He produced over 300 books and essays, many of which were on the history of Blacks in Canada. He is regarded by many as the "founder" of Black Canadian History. His work also included Great Lakes history, the aftermath of the Rebellion of 1837, and the cross-border effects of the American Civil War. His 1941 book Western Ontario and the American Frontier was part of a series of 25 volumes on Canadian-American relations (sponsored by the Carnegie Endowment for International Peace under the direction of James T. Shotwell of Columbia University) by the most respected Canadian and American historians of the era, which cast a new framework for understanding North American history. Most of his essays were prepared for the journals Ontario History and Inland Seas. His most notable work was the five volume The Province of Ontario; a history, 1615-1927, co-edited with Jesse E. Middleton in 1928. He also pioneered the study of African Canadian history.

Landon served at various times as president of the London & Middlesex Historical Society, the Ontario Library Association, the Ontario Historical Society, the Canadian Historical Association, and the Bibliographical Society of Canada, and as Chair of the Historical Sites and Monuments Board of Canada.

== Bibliography ==
A complete list of Landon's publications was compiled by Hilary Bates in Ontario History, Volume LXII, No. 1, March 1970, 5-16.

- "Canadian Opinion of Southern Secession, 1860–61." Canadian Historical Review 1.3 (1920): 255-266.
- "The Trent Affalr of 1861." Canadian Historical Review 3.1 (1922): 48-55.
- "The American Civil War and Canadian Confederation." (Royal Society of Canada, 1927).
- "Some Effects of the American Civil War on Canadian Agriculture." Agricultural History 7.4 (1933): 163-169.
- "The Agricultural Journals of Upper Canada (Ontario)." Agricultural History 9.4 (1935): 167-175.
- "The Common Man in the Era of the Rebellion in Upper Canada." Report of the Annual Meeting. Vol. 16. No. 1. The Canadian Historical Association/La Société historique du Canada, 1937. online
- "Ulrich Bonnell Phillips: Historian of the South." The Journal of Southern History 5.3 (1939): 364-371.
- Landon, Fred. Western Ontario and the American Frontier (1941).
- Lake Huron. Bobbs-Merrill, 1944.
- Ontario's African-Canadian Heritage: Collected Writings by Fred Landon, 1918-1967. (Dundurn, 2009).
