= H. Noel Fieldhouse =

Canadian historian

Horace Noel Fieldhouse, FRSC (died November 25, 1983), known as H. Noel Fieldhouse and H. N. Fieldhouse, was a Canadian historian and academic administrator.

A native of Gibraltar, Fieldhouse was educated at the University of Sheffield and the University of Oxford. During the First World War, he served as a pilot. After teaching at Sheffield and the University of Manitoba, where he was head of the History department, he arrived at McGill University in 1945. After serving as Dean of Arts and Science, Fieldhouse was appointed Vice-Principal of McGill in 1962.

He was President of the Canadian Historical Association in 1946–7.

The H. Noel Fieldhouse Award for Distinguished Teaching at McGill University is named in his honour.
