= Donald Creighton =

Canadian historian (1902–1979)

Donald Creighton CC FRSC
- Born: Donald Grant Creighton; 15 July 1902; Toronto, Ontario, Canada
- Died: 19 December 1979 (aged 77); Brooklin, Ontario, Canada
- Political party: Progressive Conservative
- Spouse: Luella Creighton (m. 1926)
- Children: Philip Creighton; Cynthia Flood
- Parents: Laura Harvie Creighton; William Black Creighton

Academic background
- Education: Victoria College, Toronto; Balliol College, Oxford
- Influences: R. G. Collingwood; James Anthony Froude; Edward Gibbon; Harold Innis; A. J. P. Taylor; G. M. Trevelyan

Academic work
- Discipline: History
- Sub-discipline: Canadian history
- Doctoral students: Ramsay Cook; H. V. Nelles; P. B. Waite
- Notable works: The Commercial Empire of the St. Lawrence (1937); John A. Macdonald (1952–1955)
- Notable ideas: Laurentian thesis

Donald Grant Creighton CC FRSC (15 July 1902 – 19 December 1979) was a Canadian historian whose major works include The Commercial Empire of the St-Lawrence, 1760–1850 (first published in 1937), a detailed study on the growth of the English merchant class in relation to the St Lawrence River in Canada. His biography of John A. Macdonald, published into two parts between 1952 and 1955, was considered by many Canadian historians as re-establishing biographies as a proper form of historical research in Canada. By the 1960s Creighton began to move towards a more general history of Canada.

Creighton's later years were preoccupied with criticizing the then ruling Liberal Party of Canada under William Lyon Mackenzie King and his successor Louis St. Laurent. Creighton denounced the Liberal Party for undermining Canada's link with the United Kingdom and moving towards closer relations with the United States, a policy which he strongly disliked.

== Background ==
Creighton was born on July 15, 1902, in Toronto, to William Black Creighton, a Methodist minister and editor of The Christian Guardian, and Laura Harvie Creighton. He attended Victoria College, in the University of Toronto, where he received his BA in 1925.

He then attended Balliol College at Oxford University, where he received his MA before returning to Canada to teach history, at the University of Toronto for his entire career. Creighton belonged to a generation of English Canadians who were proud of the British Empire, and his anglophilia was often expressed in his books.

In 1926, Creighton married Luella Bruce. Their daughter, Cynthia Flood, is also a noted Canadian fiction writer.

He received the Royal Society of Canada's J. B. Tyrrell Historical Medal in 1951, along with Jean Bruchési.

Creighton died in his sleep on 18 December 1979, from cancer, in Brooklin, Ontario, aged 77.

In 1967, Creighton was made a Companion of the Order of Canada.

== Creighton as an historian ==
Creighton was heavily influenced by Harold Innis and took an economic approach to Canadian history. His significant contribution to the field was the development of the Laurentian thesis, which defined the basis of Canadian history through geography and the nation's dependence on its major centres. Creighton's first works were studies in the Rebellion of 1837–38 in Lower Canada, which Creighton believed to be the product of a clash between the economic traditionalism of French Canada and the relentless drive of the Anglo business elite of Montreal. In turn, this led Creighton to the study of that elite, and hence into the study of the St. Lawrence in Canadian history.

In The Commercial Empire of the St. Lawrence, Creighton argued that the economic potential of the St. Lawrence system inspired successive generations of adventurers, explorers and businessmen to try to link the vast natural resources of the interior of North America with Europe. Despite heroic efforts, the dream of the St. Lawrence failed to come to life as too many impenetrable portions of the river meant it could not live up to its potential, and the development of a railroad system in the US proved to be more economical. Creighton was well known for arguing that the "natural" basis of trade in Canada ran east–west rather than north–south. In Creighton's view, the failure of commercial elites to properly develop the St. Lawrence is what led to Confederation. Creighton argued that since impassable waterfalls and rapids prevented an economic empire from being built, Canadian elites embraced a political empire, namely Confederation as a consolation prize. The theme of Confederation as a poor substitute for an economic empire was underlined in The Road To Confederation and Creighton's biography of Macdonald.

Creighton's two most important works are The Commercial Empire of the St. Lawrence (1937) and his two-volume biography of Sir John A. Macdonald, entitled Young Politician and Old Chieftain. Both volumes won the Governor General's Award for best non-fiction book in 1952 and 1955, were major best-sellers, and were credited with creating a major reassessment of Macdonald's role in Canadian history. In Creighton's view, Macdonald sought Confederation as a way of bringing to life the political St. Lawrence empire.

Creighton saw history as a literary art and rejected calls for history to be seen as social science. Creighton was famous for spending as much time crafting his prose as he did in research, and Creighton often claimed that the best historical work should read like a well written novel. Creighton disliked what he called "fat funereal volumes" of unreadable biographies, and argued that well-written books should be the historian's objective. Creighton's major influences were R. G. Collingwood, James Anthony Froude, G. M. Trevelyan, Edward Gibbon, and A. J. P. Taylor.

Creighton's vision of Canadian history was ultimately a deeply pessimistic and tragic one as he felt Canada had the potential to be the world's greatest country if only Canadians would follow the vision of the Fathers of Confederation, especially Macdonald's. In his view, most Canadian leaders had chosen to neglect that vision and had instead allowed Canada's potential to be squandered. The only leaders who merited the description of statesmen, in his view, were Macdonald and Sir Robert Borden. According to Creighton, Macdonald's time in office was Canada's Golden Age and without the exception of Borden every leader who came after Macdonald had allowed Canada to deteriorate. Thus for Creighton, Canadian history after 1891 was for the most part the story of missed opportunities, thwarted ambition, and hopes scattered as the dream that was Canada was slowly allowed to unravel.

Though Creighton normally tried to maintain a formal and cold pose, he was well known for his outspoken and passionate nature. His eruptions of rage led his publisher John Gray to call him "the terrible-tempered Mr. Bang". Creighton often engaged in feuds with historians whose interpretations he disliked, but he was known to be kind-hearted and munificent towards his students, albeit severe with those who engaged in work that he thought was wrong-headed. He made no effort at objectivity and was openly subjective and partisan in regards to his likes and dislikes. Creighton was fond of contrasting Canada's participation in the First World War and the Second World War. In Creighton's view, Robert Borden was a tough and able leader who, despite initial mistakes and missteps, was able to fully mobilize Canada and ensure that Canada contributed disproportionately to the Allied victory in 1918. Borden took the necessary steps to win the war despite the unpopularity of many of his measures. Creighton saw the rest of Canadian history as one long slide, which he largely blamed on the Liberal Party. In contrast, Creighton saw William Lyon Mackenzie King as a weak and indecisive figure who was more concerned with safeguarding the electoral fortunes of the Liberals than winning the war, and who kept Canadian troops out of combat as long as possible to avoid difficult decisions on conscription. In Creighton's opinion, thanks to Mackenzie King, Canada did not play as large a share as possible in the Allied victory.

Creighton was regarded by many as the foremost historian of his day, and his influence is still strongly felt. His books received wide public attention. Many of Canadian historians studied under Creighton, including Ramsay Cook, H. V. Nelles, and Michael Bliss. Creighton's view of Canadian history is still often studied. He helped initiate the Canadian Centenary Series, a nineteen-volume history of Canada, and served as its advisory editor. His book, The Forked Road: Canada, 1939–1957, was part of the Centenary Series.

The 1959 CBC Television miniseries A Long View of Canadian History featured a conversation between Creighton and political scientist Paul Fox.

== Creighton as a nationalist ==
As the Cold War grew hotter after 1947, historian Harold Innis, a major influence on Creighton, grew increasingly hostile to the United States. Innis warned urgently that Canada was becoming a subservient colony to its much more powerful southern neighbour. "We are indeed fighting for our lives," he warned, pointing especially to the "pernicious influence of American advertising. ...We can only survive by taking persistent action at strategic points against American imperialism in all its attractive guises." This anti-Americanism moved Creighton to a growing conviction that Canada risked being absorbed by the United States culturally, economically and politically.

In later years, Creighton frequently expressed himself through the mass media. An intense Canadian nationalist, his opinions have often been criticized, particularly by those, such as historian Susan Mann, who saw Creighton as anti-Quebec. Creighton felt that the position of the French language in Canada should be more or less what the British North America Act had prescribed. As such, Creighton was not enamoured with changes such as official bilingualism that was introduced in the 1960s and 1970s. The Quiet Revolution of the 1960s had led to a more assertive French Canadian nationalism that Creighton had no sympathy with. In 1964, when anti-British riots erupted in Quebec City when Queen Elizabeth II visited la belle province, a furious Creighton wrote Elizabeth had been "humiliated". A strong supporter of the Progressive Conservatives and small "c" conservative, Creighton's heroes were Macdonald, Robert Borden, and John Diefenbaker, for whom Creighton served as a speech writer. Likewise, Creighton was proud of Canada's British past, and regarded efforts to erase that past as a national disgrace. In his later years, Creighton moved towards the left and he was regarded as a Red Tory by the time of his death. In 1972, Creighton emerged as a leading critic of the proposed Pickering Airport.

Creighton disliked the Liberal Party as he saw the Liberals as the party of continentalism (i.e. moving Canada closer to the United States) and for taking steps that Creighton saw as an attack on Canada's British heritage, such as replacing the Canadian Red Ensign with the Maple Leaf flag in 1965. Of all the Liberal leaders, it was Lester Pearson who Creighton disliked the most. Creighton attacked the Liberal continentalist Frank Underhill as almost a traitor, imaging in one essay a smug Underhill well satisfied after 1945 with the British Empire in decline, the United States ascendant and Canada falling into the American sphere of influence. In regard to federal–provincial relations, Creighton shared Macdonald's view of a highly centralized confederation with the provinces subservient to the federal government. In Creighton's opinion, it had been a great mistake on Ottawa’s part to allow the growth of provincial powers in the 20th century. In particular, Creighton was strongly opposed to the demands made by the Quebec government for more power at the expense of the federal government during the Quiet Revolution and afterwards. Creighton saw this as the first steps towards separatism. Creighton favored a tough line against the Parti Québécois government of René Lévesque, and was one of the first to advocate partitioning Quebec in the event of a vote to leave Confederation, writing that northern Quebec was historically part of Rupert's Land and was given to Quebec by the Dominion government only in 1912.

Creighton's determination to maintain British traditions, his close association with Diefenbaker, and his dislike of continentalism led him to be accused of anti-Americanism. Later, Creighton cemented his reputation for anti-American views with his only novel, 1978's The Take-Over. As its title implies, the book dealt with an imaginary US take-over of Canada. Creighton saw himself as a lonely crusader not only against what he called the "Authorized Version" of Canadian history (i.e., the Liberal interpretation), but also against what he regarded as the widespread indifference and apathy felt by most Canadians towards their history. In Creighton's view, the so-called "Liberal Interpretation" of Canadian history would ultimately lead to Canada being absorbed into the United States. Creighton frequently proclaimed the aphorism that a people who forget their past are also doomed not to have a future. Throughout his life, Creighton struggled hard to raise the profile of history in Canadian life, and to convince Canadians that they had a grand and glorious history worth celebrating.

== Works ==
- The Commercial Empire of the St. Lawrence, 1760-1850. 1937.
  - Reprinted as Creighton, Donald (2002). The Empire of the St. Lawrence: A Study in Commerce and Politics. University of Toronto Press. ISBN 978-0-8020-8418-7. JSTOR 10.3138/j.ctt1287sz2.
- Dominion of the North: A History of Canada. 1944.
- John A. Macdonald, 2 volumes, 1952–1955.
  - John A. Macdonald: the Young Politician. 1952.
  - John A. Macdonald: the Old Chieftain. 1955.
- Creighton, Donald (1957). Harold Adams Innis: Portrait of a Scholar. University of Toronto Press. JSTOR 10.3138/j.ctt1h1hrkh.
- The Story of Canada. 1959. revised ed. 1971.
- The Road to Confederation: The Emergence of Canada, 1863-1867. 1964.
- "Myth of Biculturalism or the Great French Canadian Sales Campaign". Saturday Night: 35–40. September 1966.
- Confederation: Essays. 1967.
- Canada's First Century, 1867-1967. 1970.
- Towards the Discovery of Canada: Selected Essays. 1972.
- Canada, the Heroic Beginnings. 1974.
- The Forked Road: Canada, 1939-57. 1976.
- The Passionate Observer: Selected Writings. 1980.

Awards
Preceded by John Bartlet Brebner	J. B. Tyrrell Historical Medal; 1951; With: Jean Bruchési	Succeeded by Charles Bruce Sissons
