= Reginald George Trotter =

Reginald George Trotter, FRSC (14 July 1888–7 April 1951) was a Canadian historian. He was the Douglas Professor in Canadian and Colonial History at Queen's University, Kingston from 1924 until his death.

He was President of the Canadian Historical Association for 1938–39.

He received the J. B. Tyrrell Historical Medal in 1949.

The mathematician Hale Trotter was his son.
