= A Long View of Canadian History =

1959 Canadian television history miniseries

- Country of origin: Canada
- Original language: English
- No. of seasons: 1
- No. of episodes: 2

Production
- Producer: Cliff Solway
- Running time: 30 minutes

Original release
- Network: CBC Television
- Release: 16 June – 30 June 1959

A Long View of Canadian History is a Canadian historical television miniseries that aired on CBC Television in 1959.

== Premise ==
The series concerns Canadian history and consists of a discussion between historian Donald Creighton and political scientist Paul Fox, both professors at the University of Toronto. Two hours of film were recorded from their five-and-a-half-hour conversation, which in turn was edited to fit two half-hour episodes which aired at 10:30 p.m. (Eastern) on 16 and 30 June 1959.

CBC's Publication Branch published the text of this conversation in book form that year.
