= Aegidius Fauteux =

Canadian journalist and historian (1876–1941)

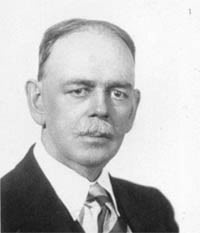
- Aegidius Fauteux, 1903
- Born: 27 September 1876; Sainte-Cunégonde, Quebec
- Died: 22 April 1941 (aged 64); Montréal, Quebec
- Resting place: Notre Dame des Neiges Cemetery
- Occupations: Journalist, Librarian, Historian
- Spouse: Antonia Chevrier
- Children: Marie-Laure Fauteux
- Parent(s): Hercule Fauteux, Exilda Dagenais

Aegidius Fauteux (27 September 1876 – 22 April 1941) was a journalist, librarian and historian. He was designated a Person of National Historic Significance by the Canadian Government in 1955. Rue Aegidius-Fauteux in Montreal is named after him.

== Biography ==
Aegidius Fauteux was born on 27 September 1876 to Hercule Fauteux and Exilda Dagenais. He completed a classical education at the Collège de Montréal. Fauteux felt a calling to the priesthood so he studied theology at the Grand Séminaire de Montréal between the years of 1887–1893. Discovering that his vocation was not in the clergy, he enrolled in law school at the Université Laval de Montréal. He was called to the bar in July 1903, but never practised.

In 1902, he founded the newspaper Le Rappel. He remained its publisher until 1904. In 1905, he became parliamentary correspondent for the Quebec newspaper La Patrie until 1909. His last encounter with journalism was being the editor-in-chief to the newspaper La Presse from 1909 to 1912.

In 1911, he married Antonia Chevrier.

In 1912, he began working at the Bibliothèque St. Sulpice, Montreal. The Great Depression caused the closure of the library in 1931, but Fauteux was hired by the city and worked as a librarian until his death in 1941. In 1937, he was the director and co-founder of the École de bibliothéconomie de l'Université de Montréal.

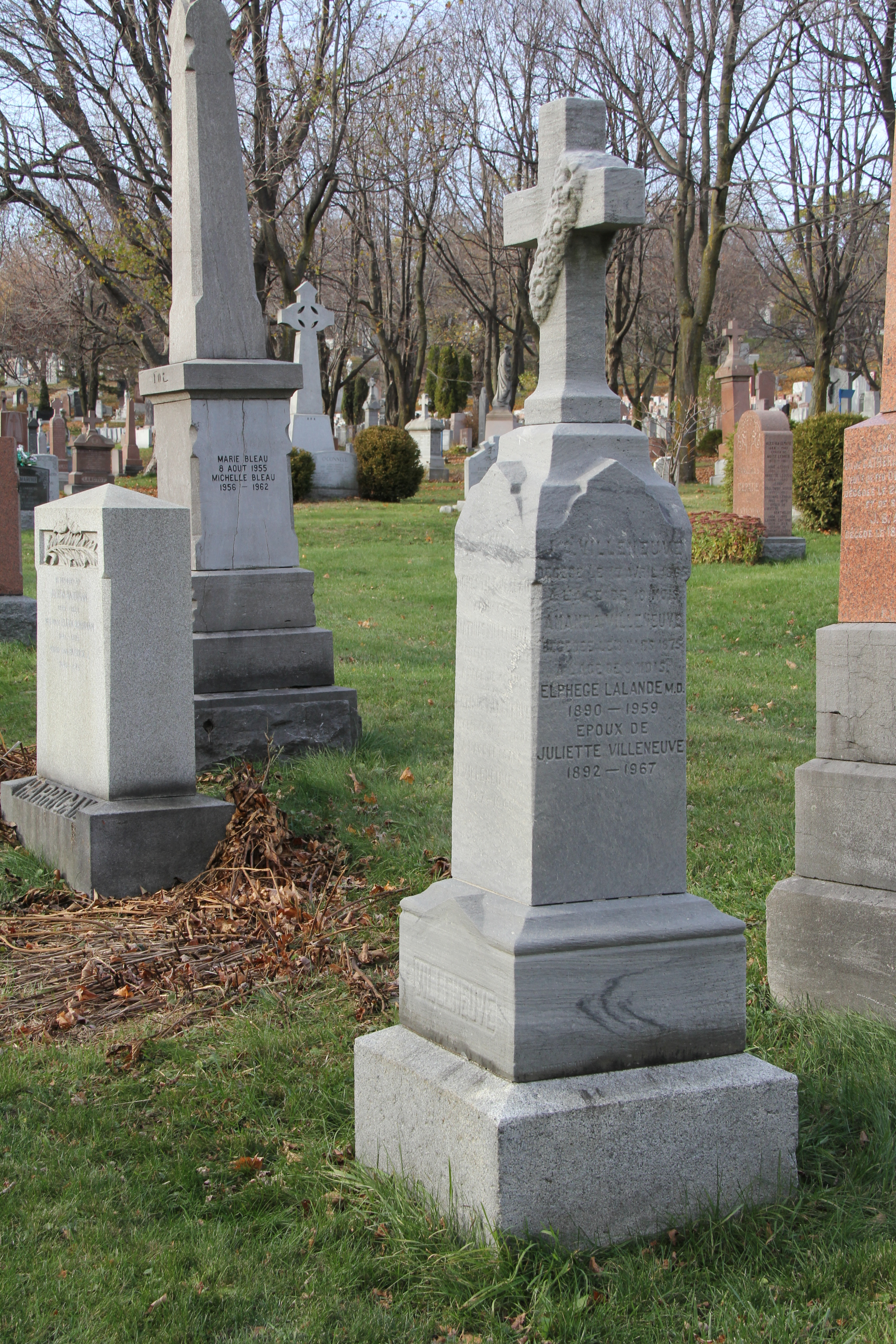
Aegidius Fauteux's tombstone in Notre-Dame-des-Neiges Cemetery (P71), Montreal.

Fauteux died a widower in Montréal on 22 April 1941, leaving an adopted daughter, Marie-Laure. He was entombed at the Notre Dame des Neiges Cemetery in Montreal.

During his life he produced six volumes of literary works and a dozen of critical editions. He wrote several bibliographies, conferences, studies and articles.

== Honours ==
- Prix du concours de littérature française, Université Laval de Montréal, 1900, 1901 and 1902
- Ruban violet d'officier de l'Académie française, 1930
- Lorne Pierce Medal in History; Honorary Doctorate of Letters, Université de Montréal, 1936
- J. B. Tyrrell Historical Medal of the Royal Society of Canada, 1937
- Medal of the Société historique de Montréal for the best history book, 1941
- Person of National Historic Significance, 1955
