= Luella Creighton =

Canadian writer (1901–1996)

- Born: Luella Sanders Bruce; August 25, 1901; Stouffville, Ontario, Canada
- Died: March 6, 1996 (aged 94); Brooklin, Ontario, Canada
- Education: Victoria College, Toronto
- Occupations: novelist, non-fiction
- Spouse: Donald Creighton
- Children: Cynthia Flood
- Writing career
- Period: 1950s–1960s
- Notable work: High Bright Buggy Wheels

Luella Sanders Creighton, née Bruce (August 25, 1901 – March 6, 1996) was a Canadian novelist and non-fiction writer. She is best known to contemporary audiences for her 1951 novel High Bright Buggy Wheels, which was reprinted by McClelland & Stewart's New Canadian Library series in 1978.

== Biography ==
Creighton was born on August 25, 1901, in Stouffville, Ontario, to James William Bruce and Luella Sanders. She taught school locally before attending Victoria College at the University of Toronto and later studying at the Sorbonne in Paris, France. She married Donald Creighton, a historian, on June 23, 1926, and operated a real estate office in Toronto before moving to Brooklin in 1962. Their daughter, Cynthia Flood, is a noted Canadian writer.

Creighton's work included historical fiction, non-fiction and children's literature. She also authored several textbooks, served as a member of the Central Ontario Regional Library Board, and assisted her husband with his writing projects.

Creighton died on March 6, 1996, in Brooklin.

== Bibliography ==
- High Bright Buggy Wheels (1951)
- Turn East, Turn West (1954)
- Canada, The Struggle for Empire (1960)
- Canada, Trial and Triumph (1963)
- Tecumseh, the Story of the Shawnee Chief (1965)
- Miss Multipenny and Miss Crumb (1966)
- The Elegant Canadians (1967)
- The Hitching Post (1969).
