= Quebec, The Revolutionary Age 1760–1791 =

Quebec, The Revolutionary Age 1760–1791 is a book (ISBN 0-7710-6658-9) by Canadian historian Dr. Hilda Neatby, published in 1966 in both the French and English languages as part of The Canadian Centenary Series.

The books examines the transitional events between 1760 and 1791 in the colonial province of Quebec, Canada. It examines the events following the British forces' victory over the French army, and the decision made by the King of France to hand over Quebec to the British in the Treaty of Paris (1763), which ended the Seven Years' War.
