= Cynthia Flood =

Canadian writer

- Born: Cynthia Creighton; September 17, 1940 (age 85); Toronto, Ontario, Canada
- Occupation: fiction writer
- Relatives: Donald Creighton, father Luella Creighton, mother
- Writing career
- Period: 1980s-present
- Notable works: My Father Took a Cake to France, Making a Stone of the Heart, Red Girl Rat Boy

Cynthia Flood (born September 17, 1940) is a Canadian short-story writer and novelist. The daughter of novelist Luella Creighton and historian Donald Creighton, she grew up primarily in Toronto. After attending the University of Toronto and the University of California, Berkeley she spent some years in the United States, where she married Maurice Flood before moving to Vancouver, British Columbia in 1969.

She has been active in many socialist, feminist, anti-war, and environmental groups, and in the faculty union while an English instructor at Langara College (1971-2001). Maurice came out as gay in the 1970s, and was a prominent organizer with the Gay Alliance Toward Equality. In 1973, both Maurice and Cynthia actively campaigned to have the federal New Democratic Party more explicitly include gay rights in its platform. She and Maurice separated in 1981. Cynthia continued activity in the NDP and in the women's movement for years after that. As a member of Women Against the Budget, she participated in Vancouver's Solidarity movement (1985). As the 80s went on, she began to focus on her writing.

After retirement, she briefly taught creative writing in Simon Fraser University's writing and publishing program.

Flood's first three books of short fiction are The Animals in Their Elements, My Father Took a Cake to France (Talonbooks, 1987 and 1992), and The English Stories (Biblioasis 2009). The title story from My Father Took a Cake to France won the Journey Prize in 1990, and she has also won awards from Western Magazines and Prism International. Her work has been widely anthologized, and has been repeatedly included in Best Canadian Stories. Her novel Making a Stone of the Heart (Key Porter, 2002) was nominated for the City of Vancouver Book Award that year.

Her collection, The English Stories was published in April 2009 by Biblioasis. These short fictions are set in 1950s England. One, "Religious Knowledge," won the National Magazine Gold Award in 2000, after its publication in PRISM International. Another, "Learning to Dance," is included in Best Canadian Stories 2008, edited by John Metcalf.

Flood's 2013 collection, Red Girl Rat Boy (Biblioasis), was chosen by January Magazine and Quill & Quire as one of 2013's notable books. It was shortlisted for the Ethel Wilson Fiction Prize from BC Book Prizes, and long-listed for the Frank O'Connor Short Story award. Her work appears regularly in literary magazines, e. g. Fireweed, Queen's Quarterly, A Room of One's Own, Wascana Review, and in "Best Canadian Stories".

In 2017 Biblioasis published her fifth book of short fictions, "What Can You Do." As with her other books, many of the stories appeared first in literary magazines.

Most recently, a Selected book of Cynthia Flood's stories has appeared, titled "You Are Here" (Biblioasis). This book contains 20 of Flood's best stories from her five collections.
