= John Kendle =

Canadian historian (born 1937)

John Edward Kendle is a historian who was born in England but immigrated as a child to Canada, where he has spent most of his life. He was formerly the President of the Canadian Historical Association and for many years chaired the Department of History at the University of Manitoba. In addition he chaired the Historic Sites Advisory Board of Manitoba. In the academic year 1985-86 he was the Commonwealth Fellow at St John's College, Cambridge. Among his books are works on Walter Long, John Bracken, and the Round Table Movement.

== See also ==
- St. John's College, Manitoba
