= William J. Eccles =

Canadian historian of New France

William John Eccles (17 July 1917 – 2 October 1998) was a British-born Canadian historian and academic, specialising in the history of New France.

== Early life and education ==
Born in Thirsk, North Yorkshire, England, his family immigrated to Canada in the 1920s. He grew up in Montréal, Québec. He studied at McGill University. Following graduation, he did post-graduate studies at McGill under historian Edward Robert Adair. He later dedicated his book Canada under Louis XIV to Adair.

During World War II, he served overseas with the Royal Canadian Air Force. He then did further graduate study at the Sorbonne in Paris.

== Academic career ==
=== Faculty positions ===
Upon his return from France, Eccles joined the faculty at the University of Manitoba. He taught there for four years, from 1953 to 1957, then moved to the University of Alberta, where he taught from 1957 to 1963. In 1963, he was appointed to a professorship at the University of Toronto, where he taught for 20 years.

Eccles held visiting Professorships at the University of Chile, McGill University, College of William and Mary (Virginia), and the University of Western Ontario.

=== Analysis of the history of New France ===
==== Revisionist approach and critique of Francis Parkman ====
Eccles is credited with leading a revival of interest in the history of New France amongst anglophone Canadian historians, and also influencing francophone historians who were re-examining their own understandings of their history. He took a revisionist approach to the image of French Canada which had developed in the 19th century. In his first book, Frontenac, The Courtier Governor, he challenged the myth of Frontenac as an heroic governor. He went on to heavily criticise the work of the American historian Francis Parkman and accused him of an Anglo-American bias and a prejudiced view of First Nations peoples and the French. Eccles also argued that Parkman had misinterpreted the French sources based on Parkman's own personal biases: "In short, his appeal is to innate chauvinism". In another book, Eccles wrote: "Francis Parkman's epic work La Salle and the Discovery of the Great West (Boston, 1869) is doubtless a great literary work, but, as history, it is, to say the least, of dubious merit." Eccles was later characterised as a "fearsome iconoclast" in his historical writings.

==== Conflict between colonial policy and fur trade expansion ====
Instead of the anglocentric view, which he considered to be espoused by Parkman, Eccles argued that the formative value of New France was the 17th-century French nobility, which emphasised the hierarchy of the seigneurial class and the value of the military establishment. He also developed the thesis that there was an inherent tension between the colonial policy of the French government, and the economic realities of the fur trade. Eccles argued that the French government wanted to develop a "compact colony", of settlers farmers and minor industries, based on the Saint Lawrence River, which was the vision of Jean-Baptiste Colbert, the chief minister to the Sun King from 1661 to 1683. He discouraged attempts to build elaborate fur-trading chains to the Great Lakes and the Ohio Country, which he considered would overextend the resources of the colony and the ability of France to defend it. The settlers of New France, however, repeatedly ignored those restrictions and steadily expanded trade chains to the west.

== Later life ==
Eccles retired from the University of Toronto in 1983. He died in Toronto on 2 October 1998 after a brief illness. He was survived by his wife, a son and a daughter, another son having predeceased him.

His papers are located in the archives of McMaster University.

== Awards ==
His book Frontenac: The Courtier Governor received the 1959 Award of the Pacific Coast Branch of the American Historical Association.

In 1979, the Royal Society of Canada awarded him the J. B. Tyrrell Historical Medal for his contributions to the history of Canada even though he had refused to allow his name to stand for election to the Royal Society.

He received an honorary doctorate from the University of Genoa, Italy.

== Bibliography ==
- Frontenac: The Courtier Governor (1959) French ed. (1963). New ed. (2003)
- Canada Under Louis XIV (1964)
- Canadian Society During the French Regime (1968)
- The Canadian Frontier, 1534-1760 (1969) Rev. ed. (1983)
- France in America (1972) Rev. ed. (1990)
- Essays on New France (1987)
- The French in North America, 1500-1783 Rev. ed. (1998)
