= Pierre-Georges Roy =

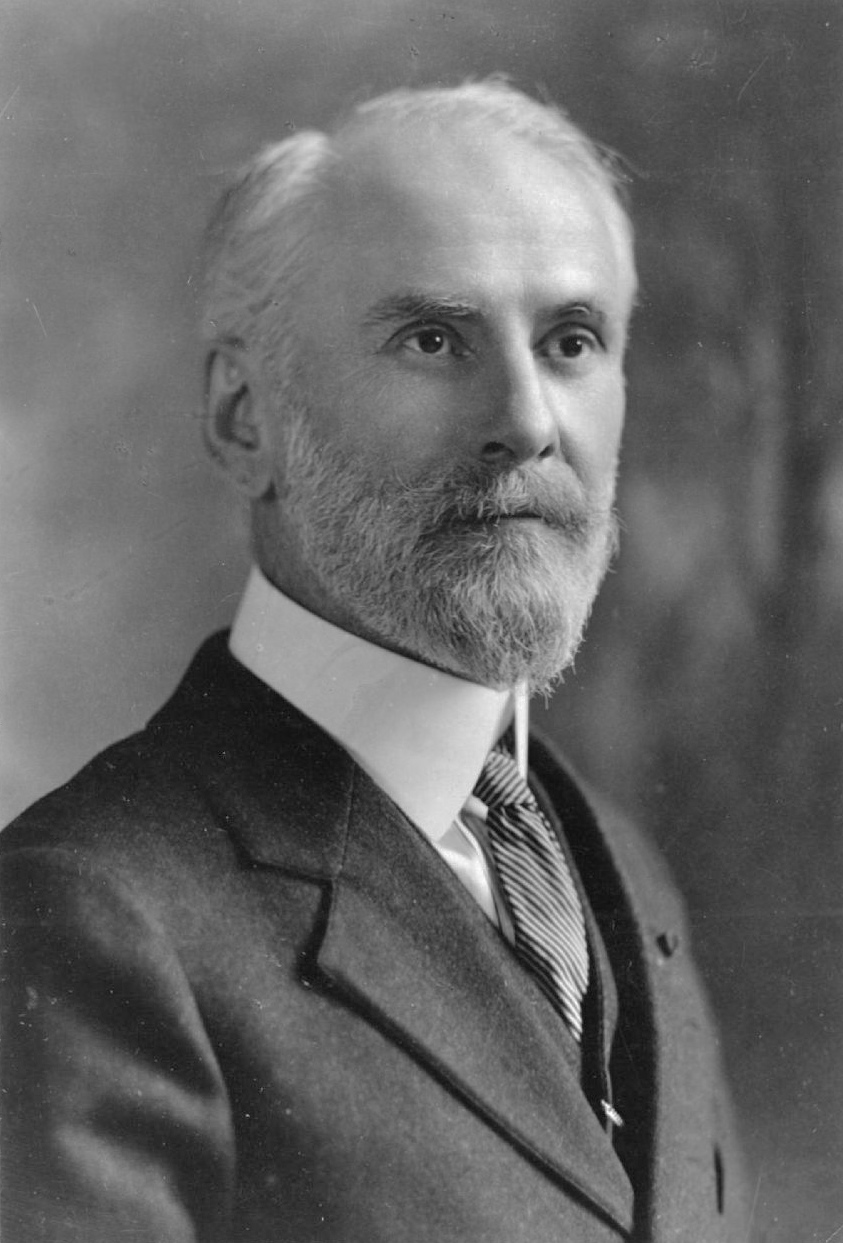
- Born: October 23, 1870; Lévis, Quebec
- Died: November 4, 1953 (aged 83); Lévis, Quebec

Pierre-Georges Roy, KCSG, FRSC (French pronunciation: [pjɛʁ ʒɔʁʒ ʁwa]; 23 October 1870 – 4 November 1953) was a Canadian journalist, historian, and archivist.

Born in Lévis, Quebec, Roy was a journalist for the Canadien and the Quotidien. In 1895, he founded the Bulletin des recherches historiques. In 1920, he was appointed the first Chief Archivist of the province of Quebec. He died in 1953 in Lévis.

== Honours ==
In 1919, he was made a Knight Commander of the Order of St. Gregory the Great. In 1927, he was made a Knight of the Legion of Honour. In 1932, he was awarded the Royal Society of Canada's J. B. Tyrrell Historical Medal.
