= Chester Martin =

Canadian historian

Chester Bailey Martin, FRSC (1882 – 2 April 1958) was a Canadian historian. (Note: His name is given as Chester Baily Martin in some sources.)

Martin was educated at the University of New Brunswick, before becoming one of the first Canadian Rhodes Scholars in 1904. He attended Balliol College, Oxford, where he won the Gladstone Memorial Prize, the Brassey Studentship, and the Beit Scholarship. He became Professor of History at the University of Manitoba in 1909, before moving to the University of Toronto in 1929, where he succeeded George MacKinnon Wrong.

Elected a fellow of the Royal Society of Canada in 1920, Martin was President of the Canadian Historical Association (of which he was a founding member) from 1928 to 1929. He received the J. B. Tyrrell Historical Medal in 1940.
