= George Glazebrook =

Canadian historian (1899–1989)

George Parkin de Twenebrokes Glazebrook (1899–1989) was a Canadian historian and civil servant.

Born in London, Ontario, the son of Arthur and Lucy Glazebrook, George Glazebrook was educated at the University of Toronto (University College) and the University of Oxford. He was on the staff of the history department of the University of Toronto from 1924 until 1941 or 1942, when he joined the staff of the Department of External Affairs.

He returned to Toronto in 1946, but resigned in 1949 to become Director of the Joint Intelligence Bureau of the Department of External Affairs. He retired from the public service in 1963 and returned to the University as a special lecturer, a post he held until 1967.

He received the Royal Society of Canada's J. B. Tyrrell Historical Medal in 1954.

== Works ==
- A History of Transportation in Canada (The Ryerson Press and Yale University Press, 1938)
- Life in Ontario: A Social History (University of Toronto Press, 1968)
- The Story of Toronto (University of Toronto Press, 1971)
