= Tom Glazebrook =

Australian rugby league footballer

Playing information
- Position: Lock
Club
| Years | Team | Pld | T | G | FG | P |
|---|---|---|---|---|---|---|
| 1918 | Eastern Suburbs | 7 | 1 | 0 | 0 | 3 |

Tom Glazebrook was an Australian rugby league player. A lock, he played seven matches for the Eastern Suburbs in 1918, scoring one try against Newtown.
