= Allison Glazebrook =

Professor at Brock University

- Born: 1966 (age 59–60)

Academic background
- Education: University of Alberta, Queen's University at Kingston, University at Buffalo

Academic work
- Discipline: Culture of Greece
- Institutions: Brock University
- Notable works: Themes in Greek Society and Culture

Allison Glazebrook (born 1966) is a Canadian classicist, Professor of Greek Social and Cultural History, Gender and Sexuality, and Greek Oratory at Brock University. She was President of the Classical Association of Canada 2018–20.

== Education and early career ==
Glazebrook undertook her BA at the University of Alberta before completing her MA at Queen's University at Kingston and her PhD at the University at Buffalo. Glazebrook taught at Stanford University before joining Brock University in 2003.

== Work ==
Glazebrook's work focuses on Greek social history, working in particular on sexuality and gender. She is well known for her work on prostitutes in Athens and commented in 2019 that:

"In part, my work is a reaction to scholarship that idealizes the ancient hetaira, and attempts to look at how prostitution affected the lives of women across ancient Athenian society."

Glazebrook was the 2019 Visiting Speaker for the Western Tour (Manitoba, Alberta and British Columbia) of the Classical Association of Canada.

The Canadian Embassy in Athens invited Glazebrook to deliver three lectures on working women in ancient Athens in celebration of International Women's Day 2019.

From 2018 to 2020 Glazebrook was the President of the Classical Association of Canada, and now serves as Past President (2020–2022).

== Select publications ==
- (2021) Sexual Labor in the Athenian Courts, University of Texas Press ISBN 978-1-4773-2440-0
- “Female Sexual Agency and an Enslaved “Olynthian”: Demosthenes 19.196-8” in Slavery and Sexuality in Classical Antiquity. eds. D. Kamen and C.W. Marshall (2021) University of Wisconsin Press. 141–58. ISBN 978-0-299-33190-0
- ed. with Christina Vester (2017) Themes in Greek Society and Culture: An Introduction to Ancient Greece (New York: Oxford University Press) ISBN 978-0-19-902065-2; second edition (2022) ISBN 978-0-19-903681-3
- ed. with Barbara Tsakirgis (2016) Houses of Ill Repute: The Archaeology of Brothels, Houses, and Taverns in the Greek World (Philadelphia: University of Pennsylvania Press) ISBN 978-0-8122-4756-5
- "Prostitutes, Plonk, and Play: Female Banqueters on a Red-figure Psykter from the Hermitage" Classical World Volume 105, Number 4, Summer 2012 pp. 497–524
- ed. with Madeleine M. Henry (2011) Greek Prostitutes in the Ancient Mediterranean, 800 BCE to 200 CE (Wisconsin studies in classics. Madison: University of Wisconsin Press) ISBN 978-0-299-23564-2
- "Prostituting Female Kin (Plut. Sol. 23.1-2)" Dike 8 pp. 33–53
