= Édouard-Zotique Massicotte =

Canadian journalist and historian (1867–1947)

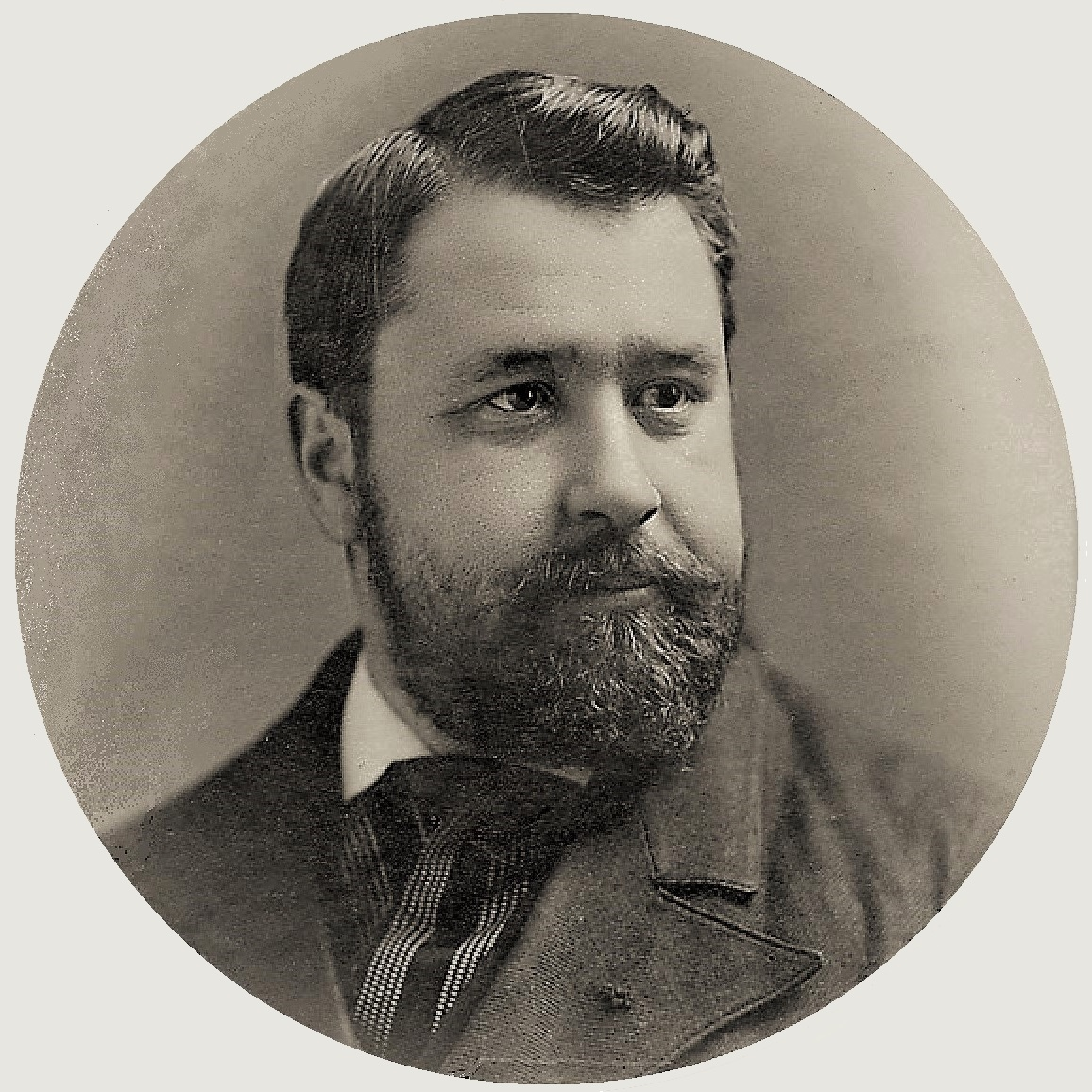
Édouard-Zotique Massicotte

Édouard-Zotique Massicotte, MRSC (24 December 1867 – 8 November 1947) was a Canadian historian, archivist, journalist, and literary critic.

== Biography ==
In 1883, Massicotte became interested in Quebec folklore and began collecting songs in the Montreal area. After he became acquainted with Marius Barbeau in 1917, they began collaboratively collecting songs in Montreal and in the region of Trois-Rivières.

Massicotte was elected to the Royal Society of Canada in 1920 and won its J. B. Tyrrell Historical Medal in 1939.

He was the brother of the illustrator Edmond-Joseph Massicotte.
