= Iere Village =

Coordinates: 10°17′N 61°23′W

Iere Village is a small village in southern Trinidad, north west of Princes Town. Though small in size, the village is rich in history. It is the site of the first Presbyterian church, the first Islamic mosque and the first government funded school in Trinidad. The village is located on the Naparima Mayaro Road just outside Princes Town. The village's primary school, Iere Government Primary, has been rebuilt and located further up the road from its original location on Richmond.

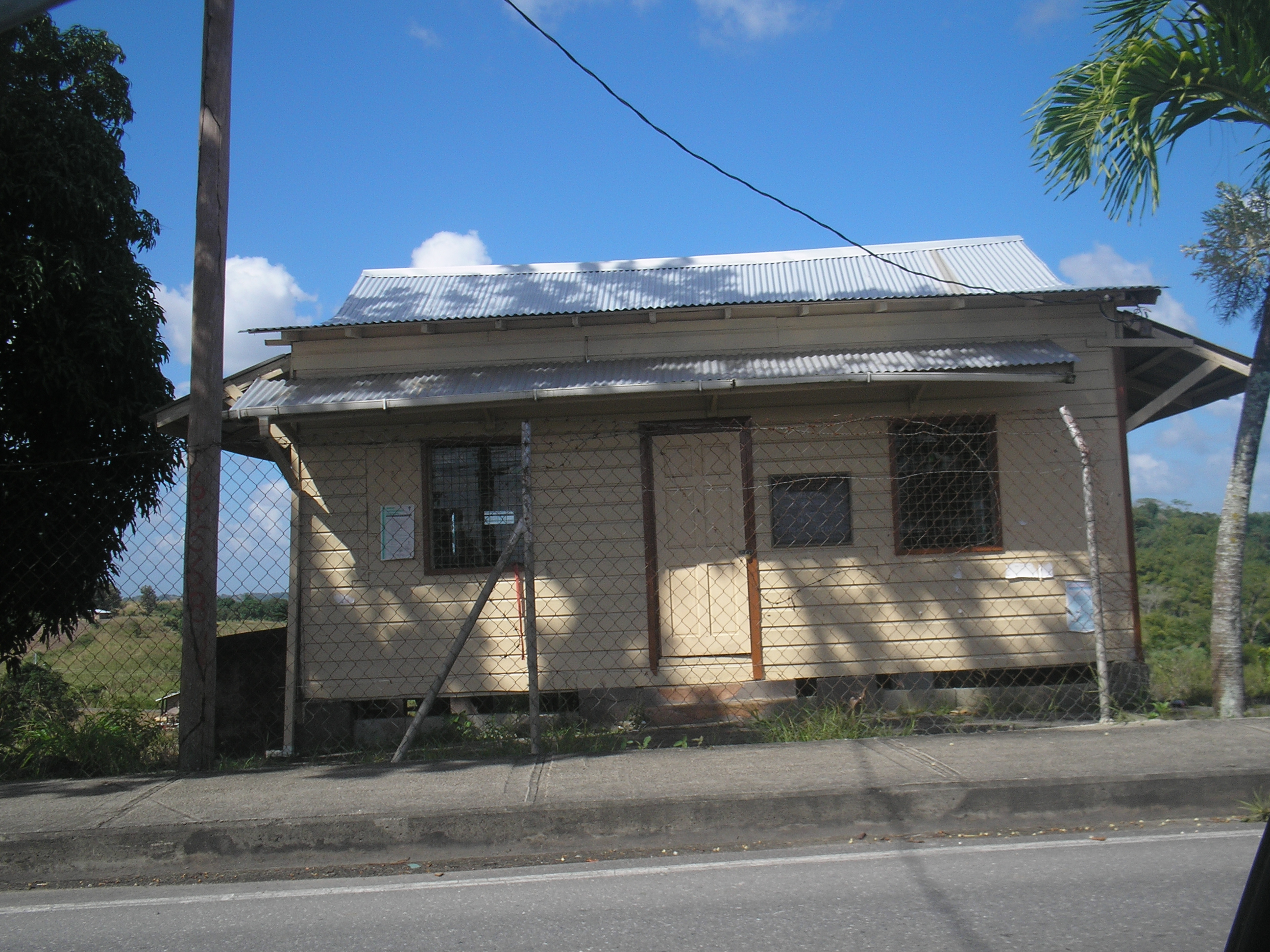
All that is left of the first primary school in Trinidad. The annex.

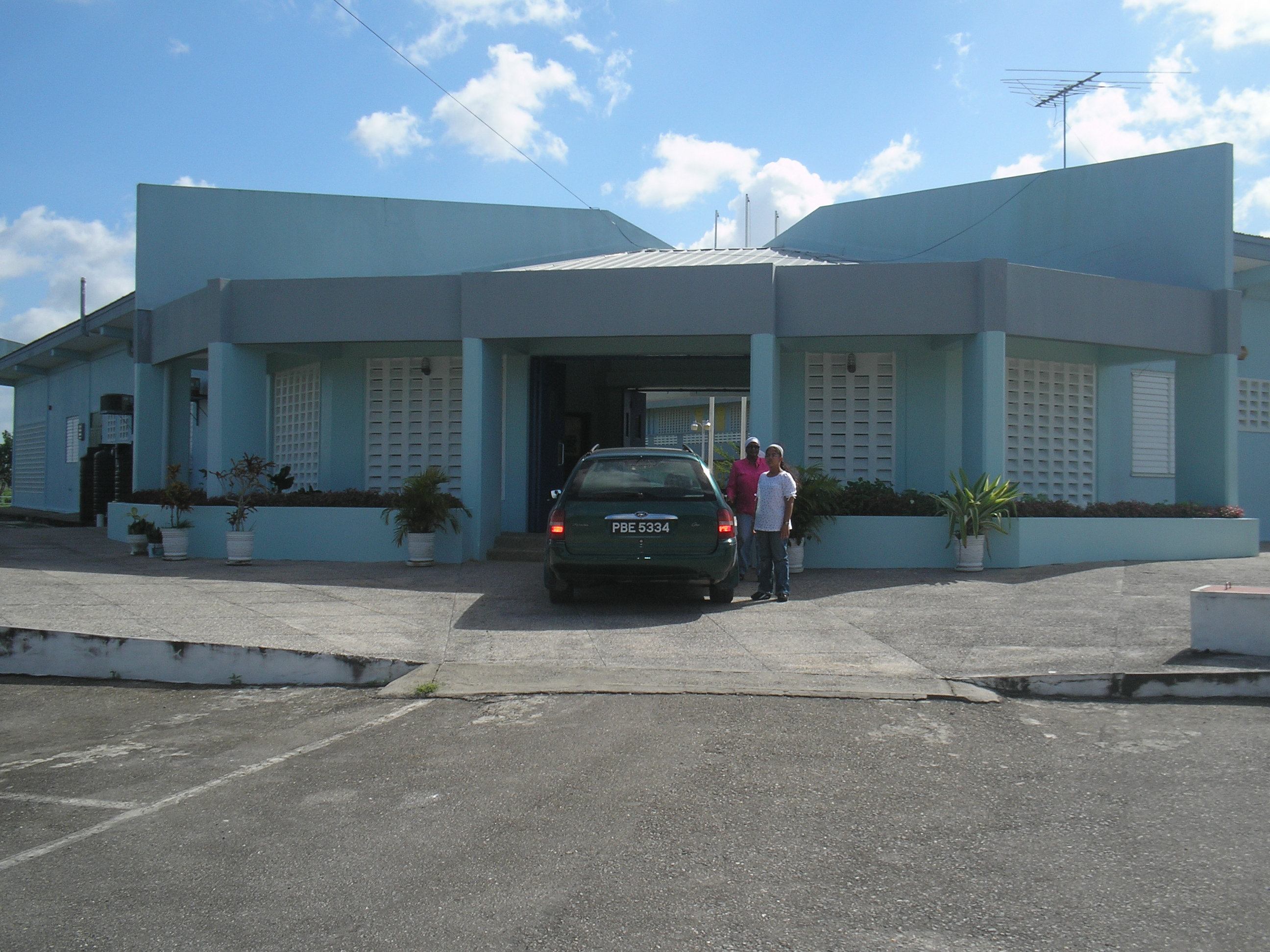
Iere Village Government Primary School

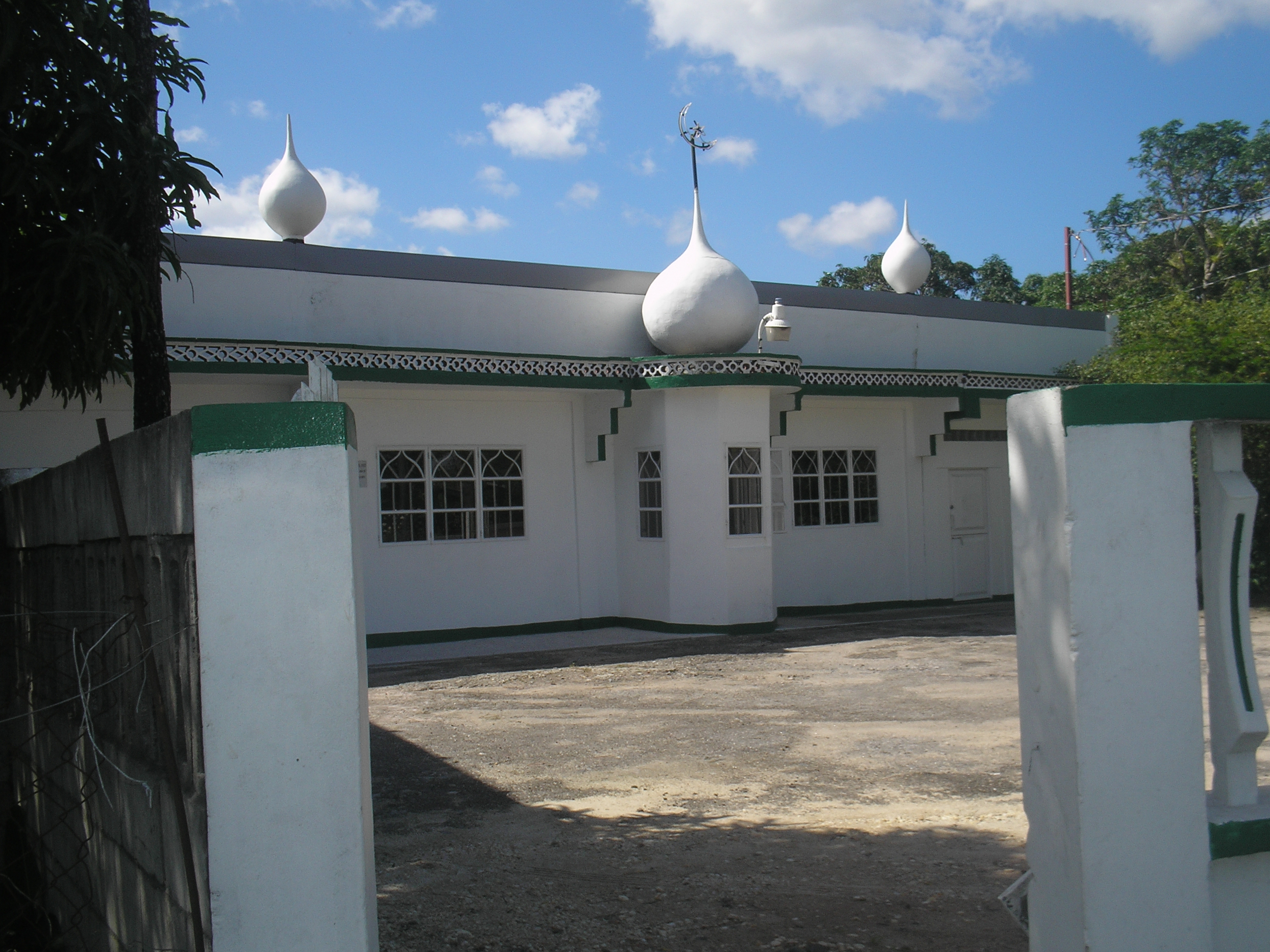
The first Masjid in Trinidad

The first Presbyterian church in Trinidad

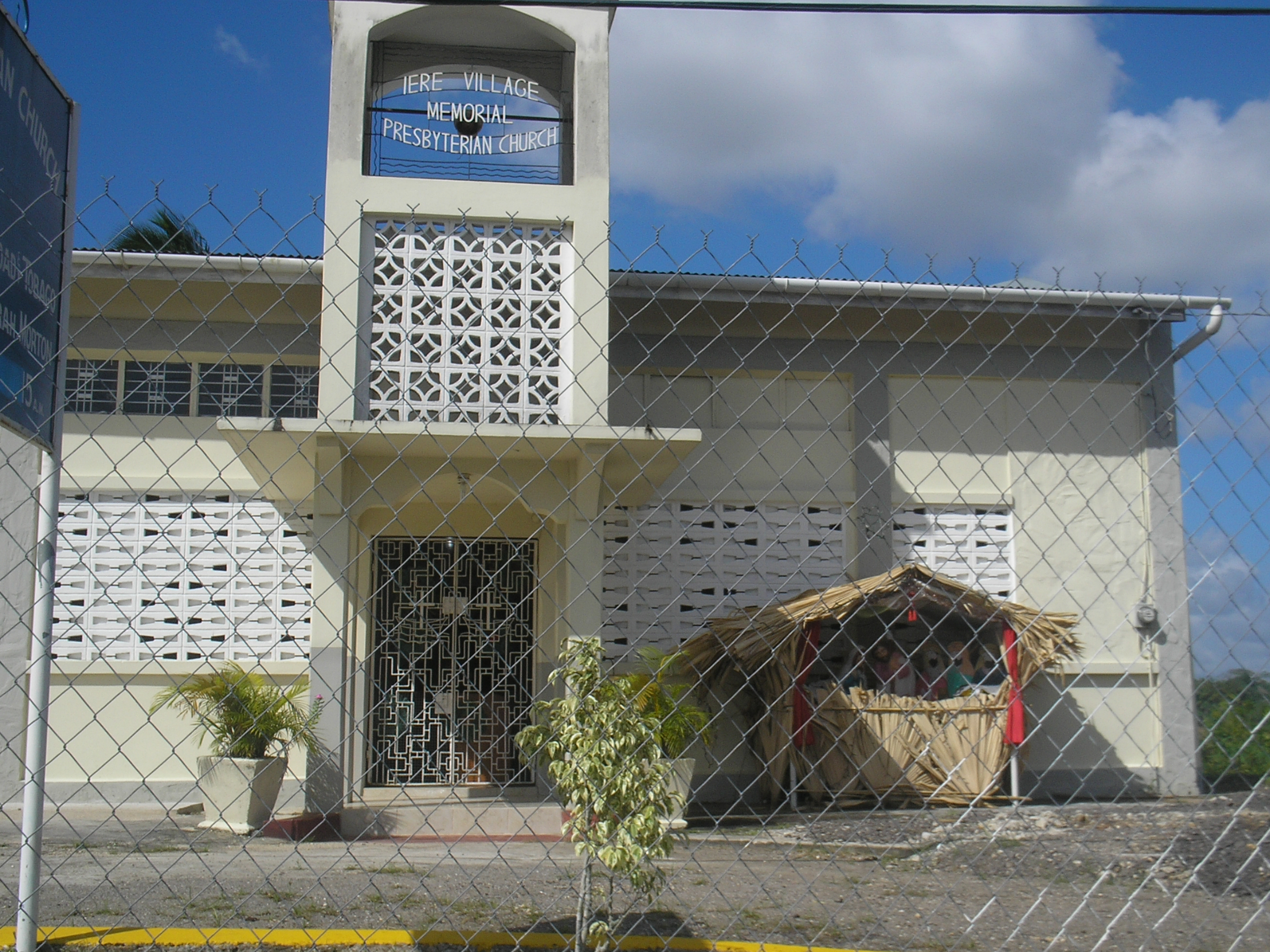
The actual church.

== See also ==
- List of cities and towns in Trinidad and Tobago
