= Edward Robert Adair =

British historian (1888–1965)

Edward Robert Adair, FRHistS (April 26, 1888 – April 12, 1965) was a British and Canadian historian.

== Life and career ==
Born in London, Adair was the son of Colonel Edward A. Adair, a Confederate States Army officer who declined to take the oath of amnesty after the American Civil War and went into exile. He was educated at London University and Peterhouse, Cambridge, where he won the Gladstone Memorial Prize. Rejected for military service during the First World War for medical reasons, he became a senior history master at Felsted School.

He became a senior lecturer in 1919 at University College, London, and went to McGill University in 1925 as associate professor, eventually becoming chairman of the History Department from 1942 to 1947. He retired from McGill University in 1954 and died in Austin, Texas a year later.

A fellow of the Royal Historical Society, he was President of the Canadian Historical Association for 1935–1936.
