= W. L. Morton =

Canadian historian (1908–1980)

W. L. Morton OC FRHistS FRSC
- Born: 13 December 1908; Gladstone, Manitoba, Canada
- Died: 7 December 1980 (aged 71); Medicine Hat, Alberta, Canada
- Political party: Progressive Conservative
- Parent: William Morton

Academic background
- Education: University of Manitoba; St John's College, Oxford

Academic work
- Discipline: History
- Sub-discipline: Canadian history
- Institutions: University of Manitoba; Trent University

William Lewis Morton OC FRHistS FRSC (13 December 1908 – 7 December 1980) was a Canadian historian who specialized in the development of the Canadian west. Along with Arthur R. M. Lower and Donald Creighton he is regarded as one of the dominant Canadian historians of his generation.

== Biography ==
Morton was born on 13 December 1908 in Gladstone, Manitoba. He won a Rhodes Scholarship and attended the University of Oxford, where he studied history. He returned to Canada to teach at Brandon College, the University of Manitoba, and then at Trent University. W. L. Morton served as head of the Department of History and Provost of University College of the University of Manitoba. He helped initiate the Canadian Centenary Series project and served as the Executive Editor for the nineteen-volume authoritative history of Canada. He served as president of the Canadian Historical Association from 1959 to 1960. Morton was one of the most prominent early faculty members of Trent University at Peterborough, Ontario, and was the first Master of the university's Champlain College.

Morton was a strong supporter of the Progressive Conservative Party and was very much a Red Tory. In 1969, he was made an Officer of the Order of Canada "for his contributions as an historian, teacher and author of several books on Canadian History."

Morton was a passionate nationalist and a conservative who fought against the liberal ideas that dominated Canadian thought after 1960, when the younger generation focused more on race, class, and gender as opposed to the national themes that intrigued Morton.

Morton died on 7 December 1980 in Medicine Hat, Alberta.

== Works ==
- Newfoundland in Colonial Policy, 1775–1793 (1935; BLitt thesis)
- Third Crossing: A History of the Town and District of Gladstone in the Province of Manitoba (1946)
- The Progressive Party in Canada (1950; winner of the 1950 Governor General's Award for Nonfiction)
- The London Correspondence Inward from Eden Colvile, 1849–1852 (1956)
- Alexander Begg's Red River Journal and Other Papers Relative to the Red River Resistance of 1869–70 (1956)
- Manitoba: A History (1957)
- One University: A History of the University of Manitoba (1960)
- The Canadian Identity (1961)
- The Kingdom of Canada (1963)
- The Critical Years: The Union of British North America, 1857–1873 (1964)
- Manitoba: The Birth of a Province (1965)
- Contexts of Canada's Past: Selected Essays of W.L. Morton (1980)

== See also ==
- Conservatism in Canada

Academic offices
Preceded by Eugene Forsey	Chancellor of Trent University; 1977–1980	Succeeded by Margaret Laurence
Professional and academic associations
Preceded by Antoine d'Eschambault	President of the Canadian Historical Association; 1959–1960	Succeeded by W. K. Ferguson
