= Jane Glazebrook =

American botanist

Jane Glazebrook is an American botanist known for her work on understanding plant defenses against pathogens and increasing crop yields. She received her Ph.D. from the Massachusetts Institute of Technology in 1991 and is now a professor of Plant Biology at the University of Minnesota. She was the editor-in-chief of the journal Molecular Plant-Microbe Interactions. She is married to Fumiaki Katagiri, who also works at the University of Minnesota as a professor of Plant Biology.

Glazebrook's research focuses on defenses of plants against pathogens. Her lab especially works with the plant Arabidopsis thaliana and the pathogens Pseudomonas syringae and Alternaria brassicicola.

== Awards and recognition ==
=== Grants ===
- Katagiri, Fumiaki; Glazebrook, Jane. (April 2017-March 2021). Evolution of the plant immune signaling network. National Science Foundation. Award Abstract #1645460.
- Markou, George C; Glazebrook, Jane; Katagiri, Fumiaki; Sarkar, Casim. (February 2017-February 2019). Engineering Plant Immunity via Directed Evolution of Imm. USDA National Institute of Food & Agriculture.
- Glazebook, Jane. (August 2014-July 2019). Systems Analysis of Calmodulin and the CBP60 Gene Family in Control of Plant Immunity. National Science Foundation. Award Abstract #1353854.
- Katagiri, Fumiaki; Glazebrook, Jane. (June 2012-May 2016). Collaborative Research: ABI Innovation: PlantSimLab: A S. National Science Foundation.
- Gibson, Sue; Glazebrook, Jane; Katagiri, Fumiaki; Orf, James H. (May 2010-October 2014). Exploiting genetic variation in soybean to improve seed. MN Soybean Research & Promotion Council.
- Glazebrook, Jane. (September 2009-August 2015). Analysis of the Role of CBP60 Proteins in Defense Signal. National Science Foundation.
- Gibson, Sue; Glazebrook, Jane; Katagiri, Fumiaki; Orf, James H. (May 2009-April 2014). Exploiting genetic variation in soybean to improve seed. MN Soybean Research & Promotion Council.
- Katagiri, Fumiaki; Glazebrook, Jane. (January 2009-January 2012). Identification of Effector Genes from Wheat Stem Rust. Two Blades Foundation.
- Gibson, Sue; Glazebrook, Jane; Katagiri, Fumiaki; Orf, James H. (January 2009-December 2015). Exploiting genetic variation in soybean to increase oil. Consortium for Plant Biotechno.
- Gibson, Sue; Glazebrook, Jane; Katagiri, Fumiaki; Orf, James H. (May 2008-April 2012). Exploiting genetic variation in soybean to improve seed. MN Soybean Research & Promotion Council.
- Glazebrook, Jane. (September 2005-February 2016). Functional Genomics Analysis of Arabidopsis Resistance. United States Department of Energy.
- Glazebrook, Jane. (September 2004-August 2009). Network Analysis of Disease Resistance Signaling. National Science Foundation.

== Selected publications ==
- Glazebrook, Jane (August 2001). "Genes controlling expression of defense responses in Arabidopsis — 2001 status". Current Opinion in Plant Biology. 4 (4): 301–308. Bibcode:2001COPB....4..301G. doi:10.1016/s1369-5266(00)00177-1. PMID 11418339.
- Gerit Bethke; Rachael E. Grundman; Suma Sreekanta; William Truman; Fumiaki Katagiri; Jane Glazebrook. Arabidopsis PECTIN METHYLESTERASEs contribute to immunity against Pseudomonas syringae. Plant Physiology. 2014; 164(2):1093-1107. https://doi.org/10.1104/pp.113.227637
- William Truman; Suma Sreekanta; You Lu; Gerit Bethke; Kenichi Tsuda; Fumiaki Katagiri; Jane Glazebrook. The CALMODULIN-BINDING PROTEIN60 family includes both negative and positive regulators of plant immunity. Plant Physiology. 2013; 163(4):1741-1751.
- Daisuke Igarashi; Gerit Bethke; Yuan Xu; Kenichi Tsuda; Jane Glazebrook; Fumiaki Katagiri. Pattern-Triggered Immunity Suppresses Programmed Cell Death Triggered by Fumonisin B1. PLoS ONE. 2013; 8(4).
