= Medal of Service of the Order of Canada =

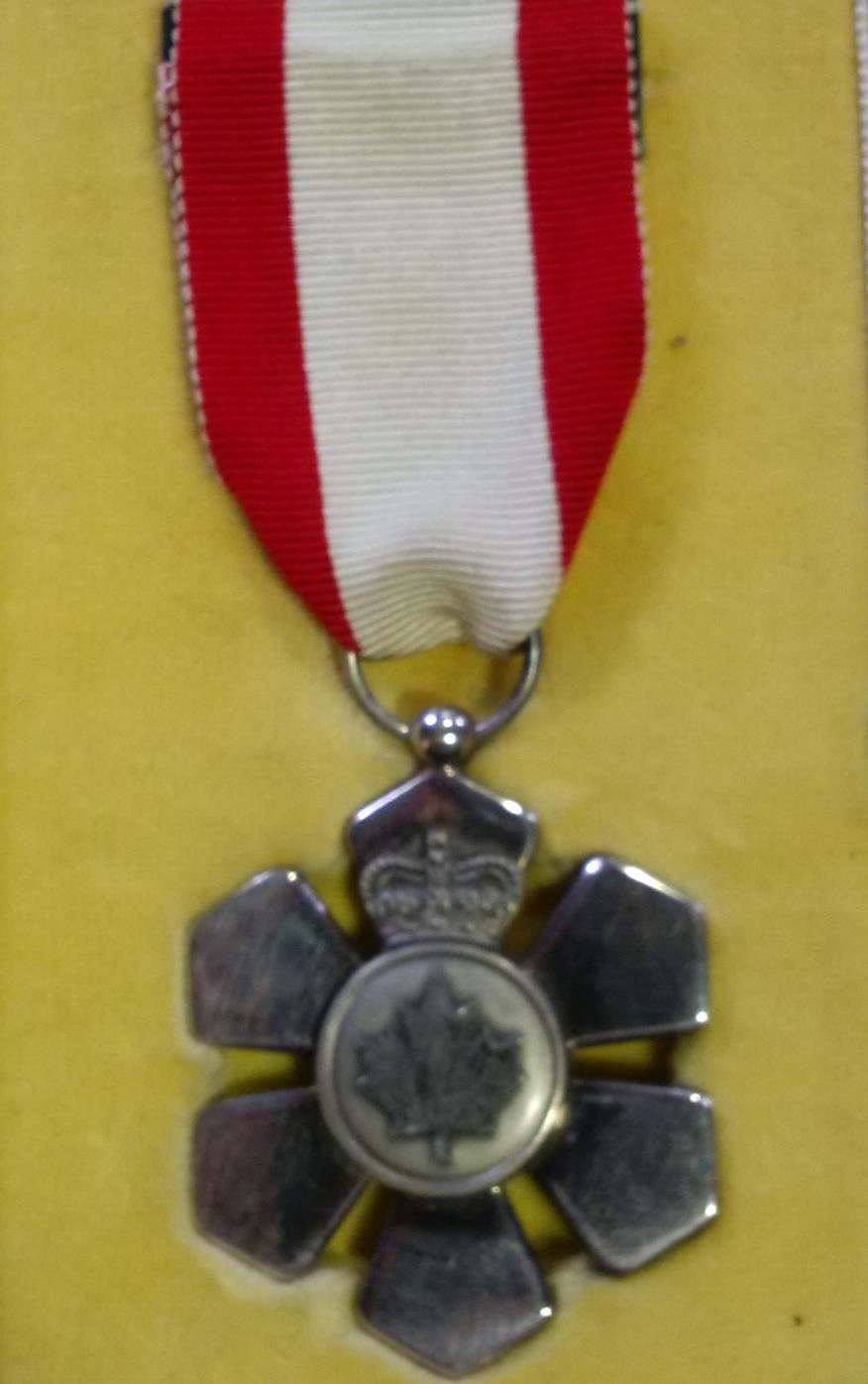
- Obverse of the Medal of Service of the Order of Canada
- Type: Medal
- Awarded for: Achievement and merit of a high degree, especially service to Canada or to humanity at large.
- Description: A silver stylized snowflake measuring 34 mm across, the obverse depicting a single stylized maple leaf enclosed within a circle, surmounted by a Crown. The reverse bears a silver disc with the word SERVICE around the top.
- Presented by: The monarch of Canada
- Clasps: None
- Status: Obsolete
- Established: 2 March 1967
- First award: 1 July 1967
- Final award: 1972

Highlights
- Total: 319
- Total awarded posthumously: None
- Total recipients: 319
- Undress ribbon

Precedence
- Next (higher): Companion of the Order of Canada
- Individual equivalent: 319

The Medal of Service of the Order of Canada was a decoration, within the Canadian system of honours, created at the same time as the Companion level of the Order of Canada and the Medal of Courage of the Order of Canada. The federal cabinet refused to allow for the establishment of a multi-level national order, and thus the Medal of Service was established as a second tier to the Companion level.

== Design ==
The Medal of Service of the Order of Canada was designed by Bruce W. Beatty, and is similar in shape to the other elements of the Order of Canada. A silver stylized snowflake measuring 34 mm across, the obverse depicting a single stylized maple leaf enclosed within a circle, surmounted by a Crown. The reverse bears a silver disc with the word SERVICE around the top. This medallion is worn on the left chest, on a 31.8 millimetres (1.25 in) wide, red and white ribbon. The undress ribbon bore a single plain silver maple leaf in the centre. For men, the Medal of Service was hung from a bar, and for women, on a ribbon bow, both pinned to the left chest.

== Conversion ==
The Medal of Service of the Order of Canada was converted into the Officer level of the Order of Canada in 1972 when the Order was reorganized into three levels; Companion, Officer and Member. All living holders of the Medal of Service were automatically converted into Officers of the Order of Canada and invited to exchange their Medal of Service insignia for that of Officer of the Order of Canada. Those who died prior to the promulgation of the new Letters Patent for the Order of Canada were not converted to being Officers of the Order of Canada.

An award permitted the recipients to use the post-nominal letters SM.

== See also ==
- The Order of Canada
- Canadian order of precedence (decorations and medals)

== Bibliography ==
— McCreery, Christopher (2015), The Canadian Honours System 2nd Edition, Dundurn Press, ISBN 978-1-4597-2415-0
