= P. B. Waite =

Canadian historian and professor (1922–2020)

Peter Busby Waite OC FRSC (July 12, 1922 – August 24, 2020) was a Canadian historian and Dalhousie University professor.

Waite was born in Toronto, Ontario in July 1922 and attended high school in Saint John, New Brunswick. He obtained B.A. and M.A. degrees from the University of British Columbia, and a PhD degree from the University of Toronto. He served with the Royal Canadian Navy during World War II, attaining the rank of Lieutenant.

Waite began his association in 1951 with Dalhousie University in Halifax, Nova Scotia. He taught at Dalhousie first as a lecturer in history (1951–1955), then assistant professor (1955–1960) and finally Thomas McCulloch Professor of History from 1960 until his retirement. Latterly, he was a professor emeritus and lived in Halifax.

In 1956, Waite, alongside other young academics, successfully lobbied Premier Robert Stanfield to preserve Crystal Crescent Beach, which became a provincial park.

Waite was an elegant writer, known especially for his analysis of the events leading to Confederation and the subsequent 30 years from 1867 to 1896. His Arduous Destiny, a history of Canada from 1874 to 1896, was part of The Canadian Centenary Series, a multi-volume project which was commissioned for the centenary of Canadian Confederation in 1967.

He published biographies of three Conservative Canadian prime ministers (Macdonald, Thompson, Bennett). His 1985 biography of Sir John Sparrow David Thompson being most notable.

He was made an Officer of the Order of Canada on October 27, 1993.

Waite died in August 2020 at the age of 98.

== Publications ==
Peter Busby Waite's main works include:

- The Life and times of Confederation 1864-1867, 1962, Toronto: University of Toronto Press. 3rd ed. Toronto: Robin Brass Studio, ISBN 1896941230.
- The Confederation Debates in the Province of Canada, 1963, Ottawa: Carleton University library. 2nd ed. 2006, Montreal, McGill-Queens University Press, ISBN 0773530924.
- Canada 1874-1896: Arduous Destiny, 1971, Toronto: McClelland & Stewart, ISBN 0-7710-8800-0.
- Macdonald: His Life and World, 1975, Toronto: McGraw-Hill Ryerson Ltd., ISBN 0-07-082301-4.
- The Man from Halifax: Sir John Thompson, Prime Minister, 1985, Toronto: University of Toronto Press, ISBN 0-8020-5659-8.
- Lord of Point Grey: Larry MacKenzie of UBC, 1987, Vancouver: University of British Columbia Press, ISBN 0-7748-0285-5.
- Canadian History, Ottawa 1988, Department of the Secretary of State of Canada, Canadian Studies Directorate (Canadian Studies Resource Guides series), ISBN 0-662-56136-8.
- Loner: Three Sketches of the Personal Life and Ideas of R.B. Bennett, 1870-1947, 1992.
- The Lives of Dalhousie University, Volume I, 1994, Montreal: McGill-Queen's University Press.
- The Lives of Dalhousie University, Volume II, 1998, Montreal: McGill-Queen's University Press.
- John A. Macdonald (Abridged ed. for students), 1999, Markham: Fitzhenry and Whiteside.
- In Search of R.B. Bennett, 2012, Montreal: McGill-Queen's University Press. ISBN 9780773539082.
