= Marcel Martel (historian) =

Canadian historian (born 1965)

Marcel Martel FRSC
- Born: 1965 (age 60–61)

Academic background
- Education: Université Laval; York University
- Doctoral advisor: Ramsay Cook

Academic work
- Discipline: History
- Sub-discipline: Canadian history
- Institutions: York University

Marcel Martel FRSC (born 1965) is a Canadian historian. He currently holds the Avie Bennett Historica Chair in Canadian History at York University.

A student of Ramsay Cook, Martel has published extensively on topics ranging from French Canadian nationalism to federal drug policy. His book Le deuil d'un pays imaginé won the 1997 Prix Michel-Brunet from the Institut d'histoire de l'Amérique française. In 2017, Martel was elected a Fellow of the Royal Society of Canada.
