= Wilcomb E. Washburn =

American historian (1925–1997)

- Born: 1925
- Died: 1 February 1997 (aged 71–72)
- Resting place: Arlington National Cemetery
- Education: Dartmouth College; Harvard University
- Scientific career
- Fields: History
- Workplaces: US National Museum, Smithsonian Institution

Wilcomb E. Washburn (1925 – 1 February 1997) was an American historian.

Washburn was born in 1925. He received a bachelor's degree from Dartmouth College, and the same year received his PhD in the History of American Civilization from Harvard University. For three years he taught history at the College of William and Mary. In 1958, he joined the Smithsonian Institution, as curator of Political History at the National Museum of American History. Later, he became chair of the Department of American Studies.

From 1968 until 1997, he served as a director for the Smithsonian's American Studies Program. Washburn died in 1997 and is buried in Arlington National Cemetery.

Washburn wrote six books and contributed to two others. He also wrote 200 journal articles, and contributed chapters to various anthologies.

== Works ==
- The Cambridge History of the Native Peoples of the Americas
- 1964 — Red Man's Land/White Man's Law
- Cosmos Club of Washington
- The Governor and the Rebel (1957)
- Against the anthropological grain
- Virginia under Charles I and Cromwell, 1625-1660
- The Native American Renaissance, 1960–1995
- Native peoples in Euro-American historiography
