= C. B. Sissons =

Canadian historian (1879–1965)

Charles Bruce Sissons, FRSC (1879 – May 27, 1965) was a Canadian historian.

Charles Bruce Sissons was born in 1879 in Crown Hill, Ontario (now part of Springwater). He graduated from Victoria College (now Victoria University, Toronto) with a degree in classics in 1901, taking the gold medal.

Sissons taught in Revelstoke, British Columbia, for four years before coming to Victoria College to teach classics. He retired in 1947 and died on May 27, 1965, in Toronto.

He received the J. B. Tyrrell Historical Medal in 1952.

== Books ==
- Egerton Ryerson: His Life and Letters (volume 1, 1937; volume 2, 1947)
- A History of Victoria University (1952)
- Church & State in Canadian Education: An Historical Study (1959)
- Nil Alienum: The Memoirs of C. B. Sissons (1964)
