= Frank Underhill =

Canadian journalist, essayist, historian, social critic and political thinker

Frank Hawkins Underhill, SM, FRSC (November 26, 1889 – September 16, 1971) was a Canadian journalist, essayist, historian, social critic, and political thinker.

== Biography ==
Frank Underhill, born in Stouffville, Ontario, was educated at the University of Toronto and the University of Oxford in which he was a member of the Fabian Society. He was influenced by social and political critics such as George Bernard Shaw and Goldwin Smith. He taught history at the University of Saskatchewan from 1914 until 1927 with a long interruption during World War I when he served as an officer in the Hertfordshire Regiment of the British Army on the Western Front. He also taught from 1927 until 1955 at the University of Toronto. He left the University of Toronto due to a dispute with the administration and later joined the faculty at Carleton University.

During the Great Depression, Underhill joined several other left-wing academics in forming the League for Social Reconstruction. He was also a founder of the Co-operative Commonwealth Federation and helped write its Regina Manifesto in 1933. He joined the editorial staff of the leftist Canadian Forum in 1927 in which he wrote a column of political commentary called "O Canada" from 1929 and served for a time as chair of that journal's editorial board. Despite those progressive leanings, Underhill had a conservative view of the historical profession and impeded the careers of several women historians.

During World War II, Underhill moved away from socialism and became a left-wing liberal continentalist. He remained a committed anti-imperialist and was almost dismissed from the University of Toronto in 1941 for suggesting that Canada would drift away from the British Empire and draw closer to the United States. His struggle with the university became a landmark in the history of academic freedom in Canada.

In 1946, Underhill observed that since the 1870s, voters in Ontario had voted for different parties, federally and provincially. This observation has been coined the Underhill's balance theory.

Underhill's most important writings are collected in the 1960 book of essays, In Search of Canadian Liberalism. In the essays, Underhill covered many Canadian concerns such as politics before and after the Canadian Confederation, relations with the United States and Britain and assessments of the actions of Canadian public figures. The essays were praised in the Oxford Companion to Canadian Literature for their "iconoclasm and trenchant wit often bordering on sarcasm". Underhill's other notable works include Canadian Political Parties (1957), The Image of Confederation (1964), and Upper Canadian Politics in the 1850s (1967).

Underhill was a strong supporter of the United States during the Cold War. He also became a supporter of the Liberal Party of Canada, particularly once his long-time friend Lester Pearson joined the government. In his later years, Underhill served as a lecturer and chair of the Department of History at Carleton University in Ottawa. Carleton University has named a major reading room and the Underhill Graduate Student Colloquium, the longest-running graduate colloquium in Canada, in memory of the former chair.

In 1967, he received the Medal of Service of the Order of Canada. Underhill died in Ottawa, Ontario in 1971.
