= Governor General's Award for English-language non-fiction =

Canadian literary award

The Governor General's Award for English-language non-fiction is a Canadian literary award that annually recognizes one Canadian writer for a non-fiction book written in English. Since 1987 it is one of fourteen Governor General's Awards for Literary Merit, seven each for creators of English- and French-language books. Originally presented by the Canadian Authors Association, the Governor General's Awards program became a project of the Canada Council for the Arts in 1959.

The program was created in 1937 and inaugurated that November for 1936 publications in two English-language categories, conventionally called the 1936 Governor General's Awards. Beginning in 1942 there were two winners annually, with separate awards presented for creative non-fiction and academic non-fiction; however, this was discontinued after the 1958 awards, and then returned to a single non-fiction category.

The winners alone were announced until 1979, when Canada Council released in advance a shortlist of three nominees. Since then, the advance shortlist has numbered three to five.

== Winners and nominees ==
=== 1930s ===
Governor General's Award for English-language non-fiction winners, 1936-1939
| Year | Author | Title |
|---|---|---|
| 1936 | Thomas Beattie Roberton | TBR: Newspaper Pieces |
| 1937 | Stephen Leacock | My Discovery of the West |
| 1938 | John Murray Gibbon | Canadian Mosaic |
| 1939 | Laura Salverson | Confessions of an Immigrant's Daughter |

=== 1940s ===
Governor General's Award for English-language non-fiction winners, 1940-1949
| Year | Author | Title |
|---|---|---|
| 1940 | J. F. C. Wright | Slava Bohu |
| 1941 | Emily Carr | Klee Wyck |
| 1942 | Bruce Hutchison | The Unknown Country |
| 1942 | Edgar McInnis | The Unguarded Frontier |
| 1943 | E. K. Brown | On Canadian Poetry |
| 1943 | John D. Robins | The Incomplete Anglers |
| 1944 | Dorothy Duncan | Partner in Three Worlds |
| 1944 | Edgar McInnis | The War: Fourth Year |
| 1945 | Ross Munro | Gauntlet to Overlord |
| 1945 | Evelyn M. Richardson | We Keep a Light |
| 1946 | Frederick Philip Grove | In Search of Myself |
| 1946 | Arthur R. M. Lower | Colony to Nation |
| 1947 | William Sclater | Haida |
| 1947 | R. MacGregor Dawson | The Government of Canada |
| 1948 | Thomas H. Raddall | Halifax, Warden of the North |
| 1948 | C. P. Stacey | The Canadian Army, 1939-1945 |
| 1949 | Hugh MacLennan | Cross-country |
| 1949 | R. MacGregor Dawson | Democratic Government in Canada |

=== 1950s ===
Governor General's Award for English-language non-fiction winners, 1950-1959
| Year | Author | Title |
|---|---|---|
| 1950 | Marjorie Wilkins Campbell | The Saskatchewan |
| 1950 | W. L. Morton | The Progressive Party in Canada |
| 1951 | Frank MacKinnon | The Government of Prince Edward Island |
| 1951 | Josephine Phelan | The Ardent Exile |
| 1952 | Donald G. Creighton | John A. Macdonald, The Young Politician |
| 1952 | Bruce Hutchison | The Incredible Canadian |
| 1953 | J. M. S. Careless | Canada, A Story of Challenge |
| 1953 | N. J. Berrill | Sex and the Nature of Things |
| 1954 | Hugh MacLennan | Thirty and Three |
| 1954 | Arthur R. M. Lower | This Most Famous Stream |
| 1955 | N. J. Berrill | Man's Emerging Mind |
| 1955 | Donald G. Creighton | John A. Macdonald, The Old Chieftain |
| 1956 | Pierre Berton | The Mysterious North |
| 1956 | Joseph Lister Rutledge | Century of Conflict |
| 1957 | Thomas H. Raddall | The Path of Destiny |
| 1957 | Bruce Hutchison | Canada: Tomorrow's Giant |
| 1958 | Pierre Berton | Klondike |
| 1958 | Joyce Hemlow | The History of Fanny Burney |
| 1959 | No award presented | |

=== 1960s ===
Governor General's Award for English-language non-fiction winners, 1960-1969
| Year | Author | Title |
|---|---|---|
| 1960 | Frank H. Underhill | In Search of Canadian Liberalism |
| 1961 | T. A. Goudge | The Ascent of Life |
| 1962 | Marshall McLuhan | The Gutenberg Galaxy |
| 1963 | J.M.S. Careless | Brown of the Globe |
| 1964 | Phyllis Grosskurth | John Addington Symonds |
| 1965 | James Eayrs | In Defence of Canada |
| 1966 | George Woodcock | The Crystal Spirit: A Study of George Orwell |
| 1967 | Norah Story | The Oxford Companion to Canadian History and Literature |
| 1968 | Mordecai Richler | Hunting Tigers Under Glass |
| 1969 | No award presented | |

=== 1970s ===
Governor General's Award for English-language non-fiction winners, 1970-1979
| Year | Author | Title |
|---|---|---|
| 1970 | No award presented | |
| 1971 | Pierre Berton | The Last Spike |
| 1972 | No award presented | |
| 1973 | Michael Bell | Painters in a New Land |
| 1974 | Charles Ritchie | The Siren Years |
| 1975 | Marion MacRae and Anthony Adamson | Hallowed Walls |
| 1976 | Carl Berger | The Writing of Canadian History |
| 1977 | Frank Scott | Essays on the Constitution |
| 1978 | Roger Caron | Go-Boy! Memories of a Life Behind Bars |
| 1979 | Maria Tippett | Emily Carr |
| 1979 | Robert Bothwell and William Kilbourn | C.D. Howe |
| 1979 | Larry Pratt and John Richards | Prairie Capitalism |

=== 1980s ===
Governor General's Award for English-language non-fiction winners, 1980-1989
| Year | Author | Title |
|---|---|---|
| 1980 | Jeffrey Simpson | Discipline of Power: The Conservative Interlude and the Liberal Restoration |
| 1980 | John Fraser | The Chinese: Portrait of a People |
| 1980 | Donald MacKay | Scotland Farewell: The People of the Hector |
| 1981 | George Calef | Caribou and the Barren-Lands |
| 1981 | Claude Bissell | The Young Vincent Massey |
| 1981 | Elspeth Cameron | Hugh MacLennan: A Writer's Life |
| 1982 | Christopher Moore | Louisbourg Portraits: Life in an Eighteenth- Century Garrison Town |
| 1982 | Northrop Frye | The Great Code: The Bible and Literature |
| 1982 | Christina McCall-Newman | Grits: An Intimate Portrait of The Liberal Party |
| 1983 | Jeffery Williams | Byng of Vimy: General and Governor General |
| 1983 | Ken Dryden | The Game |
| 1983 | H S Ferns | Reading from Left to Right: One Man's Political History |
| 1984 | Sandra Gwyn | The Private Capital: Ambition and Love in the Age of Macdonald and Laurier |
| 1984 | Bob Beal and Rod Macleod | Prairie Fire: The 1885 North-West Rebellion |
| 1984 | Graham Fraser | P.Q.: René Lévesque and the Parti Québécois in Power |
| 1985 | Ramsay Cook | The Regenerators: Social Criticism in Late Victorian English Canada |
| 1985 | Michael D. Behiels | Prelude to Quebec's Quiet Revolution: Liberalism versus Neo-nationalism |
| 1985 | John Herd Thompson | Canada 1922-1939: Decades of Discord |
| 1985 | P. B. Waite | The Man from Halifax: Sir John Thompson, Prime Minister |
| 1986 | Northrop Frye | Northrop Frye on Shakespeare |
| 1986 | Claude Bissell | The Imperial Canadian |
| 1986 | Phyllis Grosskurth | Melanie Klein |
| 1986 | Witold Rybczynski | Home |
| 1987 | Michael Ignatieff | The Russian Album |
| 1987 | Janice Kulyk Keefer | Under Eastern Eyes |
| 1987 | P. K. Page | Brazilian Journal |
| 1988 | Anne Collins | In the Sleep Room |
| 1988 | Pierre Berton | The Arctic Grail |
| 1988 | Alan Borovoy | When Freedoms Collide |
| 1988 | Edith Iglauer | Fishing with John |
| 1989 | Robert Calder | Willie: The Life of W. Somerset Maugham |
| 1989 | Janice Boddy | Wombs and Alien Spirits |
| 1989 | Robert MacNeil | Wordstruck |
| 1989 | Dale A. Russell | An Odyssey in Time: The Dinosaurs of North America |

=== 1990s ===
Governor General's Award for English-language non-fiction winners, 1990-1999
| Year | Author | Title |
|---|---|---|
| 1990 | Stephen Clarkson and Christina McCall | Trudeau and Our Times |
| 1990 | Timothy Findley | Inside Memory: Pages from a Writer's Workbook |
| 1990 | Eugene Forsey | A Life on the Fringe: The Memoirs of Eugene Forsey |
| 1990 | Ron Graham | God's Dominion: A Sceptic's Quest |
| 1990 | James King | The Last Modern: A Life of Herbert Read |
| 1991 | Robert Hunter and Robert Calihoo | Occupied Canada: A Young White Man Discovers His Unsuspected Past |
| 1991 | Northrop Frye | Words With Power |
| 1991 | Kristjana Gunnars | Zero Hour |
| 1991 | D. L. MacDonald | Poor Polidori: A Critical Biography of the Author of "The Vampyre" |
| 1991 | Rosemary Sullivan | By Heart: Elizabeth Smart, A Life |
| 1992 | Maggie Siggins | Revenge of the Land: A Century of Greed, Tragedy and Murder on a Saskatchewan Farm |
| 1992 | Michael Bliss | Plague: A Story of Smallpox in Montreal |
| 1992 | Ken Cuthbertson | Inside: The Biography of John Gunther |
| 1992 | Michael R. Marrus | Mr. Sam: The Life and Times of Samuel Bronfman |
| 1993 | Karen Connelly | Touch the Dragon |
| 1993 | Marq de Villiers | The Heartbreak Grape: A Journey in Search of the Perfect Pinot Noir |
| 1993 | Marian Fowler | In a Gilded Cage |
| 1993 | Jane Jacobs | Systems of Survival |
| 1993 | Noel Mostert | Frontiers |
| 1994 | John A. Livingston | Rogue Primate: An Exploration of Human Domestication |
| 1994 | Sharon Butala | The Perfection of the Morning: An Apprenticeship in Nature |
| 1994 | Denise Chong | The Concubine's Children: Portrait of a Family |
| 1994 | Joan Haggerty | The Invitation: A Memoir of Family Love and Reconciliation |
| 1994 | Peter Larisey | Light for a Cold Land: Lawren Harris's Work and Life-An Interpretation |
| 1995 | Rosemary Sullivan | Shadow Maker: The Life of Gwendolyn MacEwen |
| 1995 | Charles Foran | The Last House of Ulster: A Family in Belfast |
| 1995 | Linda McQuaig | Shooting the Hippo |
| 1995 | Sid Marty | Leaning on the Wind |
| 1996 | John Ralston Saul | The Unconscious Civilization |
| 1996 | Roy MacGregor | The Home Team: Fathers, Sons & Hockey |
| 1996 | T. F. Rigelhof | A Blue Boy in a Black Dress |
| 1996 | Lake Sagaris | After the First Death: A Journey Through Chile, Time, Mind |
| 1996 | Merilyn Simonds | The Convict Lover: A True Story |
| 1997 | Rachel Manley | Drumblair: Memories of a Jamaican Childhood |
| 1997 | Wade Davis | One River: Explorations and Discoveries in the Amazon Rain Forest |
| 1997 | Catherine Dunphy | Morgentaler: A Difficult Hero |
| 1997 | Terry Glavin | This Ragged Place: Travels Across the Landscape |
| 1997 | Blair Stonechild and Bill Waiser | Loyal Till Death: Indians and the North-West Rebellion |
| 1998 | David Adams Richards | Lines on the Water: A Fisherman's Life on the Miramichi |
| 1998 | Wayne Grady | The Quiet Limit of the World: A Journey to the North Pole to Investigate Global Warming |
| 1998 | Charlotte Gray | Mrs. King: The Life and Times of Isabel Mackenzie King |
| 1998 | Judy Schultz | Mamie's Children: Three Generations of Prairie Women |
| 1998 | Rudy Wiebe and Yvonne Johnson | Stolen Life: The Journey of a Cree Woman |
| 1999 | Marq de Villiers | Water |
| 1999 | Donald Harman Akenson | Surpassing Wonder |
| 1999 | Michael Bliss | William Osler |
| 1999 | Wayson Choy | Paper Shadows: A Chinatown Childhood |
| 1999 | Wayne Johnston | Baltimore's Mansion |

=== 2000s ===
Governor General's Award for English-language non-fiction winners, 2000-2009
| Year | Author | Title | Ref. |
|---|---|---|---|
| 2000 | Nega Mezlekia | Notes from the Hyena's Belly | |
| 2000 | Robert Bringhurst | A Story as Sharp as a Knife | |
| 2000 | Trevor Herriot | River in a Dry Land | |
| 2000 | A. B. McKillop | The Spinster and the Prophet | |
| 2001 | Thomas Homer-Dixon | The Ingenuity Gap | |
| 2001 | Susan Crean | The Laughing One: A Journey to Emily Carr | |
| 2001 | Ross A. Laird | Grain of Truth: The Ancient Lessons of Craft | |
| 2001 | Alberto Manguel | Reading Pictures: A History of Love and Hate | |
| 2001 | Jack Todd | The Taste of Metal: A Deserter's Story | |
| 2002 | Andrew Nikiforuk | Saboteurs: Wiebo Ludwig's War Against Big Oil | |
| 2002 | Carolyn Abraham | Possessing Genius: The Bizarre Odyssey of Einstein's Brain | |
| 2002 | Jill Frayne | Starting Out in the Afternoon: A Mid-Life Journey into Wild Land | |
| 2002 | Stephen Henighan | When Words Deny the World: The Reshaping of Canadian Writing | |
| 2002 | Don McKay | Vis à Vis: Field Notes on Poetry & Wilderness | |
| 2003 | Margaret MacMillan | Paris 1919: Six Months That Changed the World | |
| 2003 | Andrew Clark | A Keen Soldier: The Execution of Second World War Private Harold Pringle | |
| 2003 | Andrew Cohen | While Canada Slept: How We Lost Our Place in the World | |
| 2003 | Maggie de Vries | Vancouver, for Missing Sarah: A Vancouver Woman Remembers Her Vanished Sister | |
| 2003 | Ross King | Michelangelo and the Pope’s Ceiling | |
| 2004 | Roméo Dallaire | Shake Hands With the Devil: The Failure of Humanity in Rwanda | |
| 2004 | Anne Coleman | I'll Tell You a Secret: A Memory of Seven Summers | |
| 2004 | Christopher Dewdney | Acquainted With the Night: Excursions Through the World After Dark | |
| 2004 | Jane Jacobs | Dark Age Ahead | |
| 2004 | Jan Zwicky | Wisdom & Metaphor | |
| 2005 | John Vaillant | The Golden Spruce: A True Story of Myth, Madness and Greed | |
| 2005 | Ted Bishop | Riding with Rilke: Reflections on Motorcycles and Books | |
| 2005 | Michael Mitchell | The Molly Fire | |
| 2005 | Edward Shorter | Written in the Flesh: A History of Desire | |
| 2005 | Jessica Warner | The Incendiary: The Misadventures of John the Painter, First Modern Terrorist | |
| 2006 | Ross King | The Judgment of Paris: The Revolutionary Decade That Gave the World Impressionism | |
| 2006 | Afua Cooper | The Hanging of Angélique: The Untold Story of Canadian Slavery and the Burning of Old Montréal | |
| 2006 | Susanne Reber and Robert Renaud | Starlight Tour: The Last, Lonely Night of Neil Stonechild | |
| 2006 | Michael Strangelove | The Empire of Mind: Digital Piracy and the Anti-Capitalist Movement | |
| 2006 | Christine Wiesenthal | The Half-Lives of Pat Lowther | |
| 2007 | Karolyn Smardz Frost | I've Got a Home in Glory Land: A Lost Tale of the Underground Railroad | |
| 2007 | Rodrigo Bascunan and Christian Pearce | Enter the Babylon System: Unpacking Gun Culture from Samuel Colt to 50 Cent | |
| 2007 | John English | Citizen of the World: The Life of Pierre Elliott Trudeau, Volume One: 1919-1968 | |
| 2007 | Stephanie Nolen | 28: Stories of AIDS in Africa | |
| 2007 | Bridget Stutchbury | Silence of the Songbirds: How We Are Losing the World's Songbirds and What We Can Do to Save Them | |
| 2008 | Christie Blatchford | Fifteen Days: Stories of Bravery, Friendship, Life and Death from Inside the New Canadian Army | |
| 2008 | Douglas Hunter | God’s Mercies: Rivalry, Betrayal and the Dream of Discovery | |
| 2008 | Sid Marty | The Black Grizzly of Whiskey Creek | |
| 2008 | James Orbinski | An Imperfect Offering: Humanitarian Action in the Twenty-first Century | |
| 2008 | Chris Turner | The Geography of Hope: A Tour of the World We Need | |
| 2009 | M. G. Vassanji | A Place Within: Rediscovering India | |
| 2009 | Randall Hansen | Fire and Fury: The Allied Bombing of Germany, 1942-45 | |
| 2009 | Trevor Herriot | Grass, Sky, Song: Promise and Peril in the World of Grassland Birds | |
| 2009 | Eric Margolis | American Raj: Liberation or Domination? (Resolving the Conflict Between the West and the Muslim World) | |
| 2009 | Eric Siblin | The Cello Suites: J.S. Bach, Pablo Casals, and the Search for a Baroque Masterpiece | |

=== 2010s ===
Governor General's Award for English-language non-fiction winners, 2010-2019
| Year | Author | Title | Ref. |
|---|---|---|---|
| 2010 | Allan Casey | Lakeland: Journeys into the Soul of Canada | |
| 2010 | Elizabeth Abbott | A History of Marriage | |
| 2010 | Ian Brown | The Boy in the Moon: A Father's Search for His Disabled Son | |
| 2010 | Karen Connelly | Burmese Lessons: A Love Story | |
| 2010 | John English | Just Watch Me: The Life of Pierre Elliott Trudeau, 1968-2000 | |
| 2011 | Charles Foran | Mordecai: The Life and Times | |
| 2011 | Nathan M. Greenfield | The Damned: The Canadians at the Battle of Hong Kong and the POW Experience, 1941-45 | |
| 2011 | Richard Gwyn | Nation Maker: Sir John A. Macdonald: His Life, Our Times, Volume Two: 1867-1891 | |
| 2011 | JJ Lee | The Measure of a Man: The Story of a Father, a Son, and a Suit | |
| 2011 | Andrew Nikiforuk | Empire of the Beetle: How Human Folly and a Tiny Bug Are Killing North America's Great Forests | |
| 2012 | Ross King | Leonardo and the Last Supper | |
| 2012 | Nahlah Ayed | A Thousand Farewells: A Reporter's Journey from Refugee Camp to the Arab Spring | |
| 2012 | Carol Bishop-Gwyn | The Pursuit of Perfection: A Life of Celia Franca | |
| 2012 | Wade Davis | Into the Silence: The Great War, Mallory, and the Conquest of Everest | |
| 2012 | Noah Richler | What We Talk About When We Talk About War | |
| 2013 | Sandra Djwa | Journey with No Maps: A Life of P.K. Page | |
| 2013 | Carolyn Abraham | The Juggler's Children: A Journey into Family, Legend and the Genes that Bind Us | |
| 2013 | Nina Munk | The Idealist: Jeffrey Sachs and the Quest to End Poverty | |
| 2013 | Allen Smutylo | The Memory of Water | |
| 2013 | Priscila Uppal | Projection: Encounters with My Runaway Mother | |
| 2014 | Michael Harris | The End of Absence: Reclaiming What We’ve Lost in a World of Constant Connection | |
| 2014 | Arno Kopecky | The Oil Man and the Sea: Navigating the Northern Gateway | |
| 2014 | Edmund Metatawabin and Alexandra Shimo | Up Ghost River: A Chief’s Journey Through the Turbulent Waters of Native History | |
| 2014 | Maria Mutch | Know the Night: A Memoir of Survival in the Small Hours | |
| 2015 | Mark L. Winston | Bee Time: Lessons from the Hive | |
| 2015 | Ted Bishop | The Social Life of Ink: Culture, Wonder, and Our Relationship with the Written Word | |
| 2015 | David Halton | Dispatches from the Front: Matthew Halton, Canada's Voice at War | |
| 2015 | Michael Harris | Party of One: Stephen Harper and Canada's Radical Makeover | |
| 2015 | Armand Garnet Ruffo | Norval Morrisseau: Man Changing into Thunderbird | |
| 2016 | Bill Waiser | A World We Have Lost: Saskatchewan Before 1905 | |
| 2016 | Kamal Al-Solaylee | Brown: What Being Brown in the World Today Means (To Everyone) | |
| 2016 | Teva Harrison | In-Between Days: A Memoir about Living with Cancer | |
| 2016 | Harold R. Johnson | Firewater: How Alcohol is Killing My People (and Yours) | |
| 2016 | Marc Raboy | Marconi: The Man Who Networked the World | |
| 2017 | Graeme Wood | The Way of the Strangers: Encounters with the Islamic State | |
| 2017 | Sharon Butala | Where I Live Now: A Journey through Love and Loss to Healing and Hope | |
| 2017 | Sarah de Leeuw | Where It Hurts | |
| 2017 | Elaine Dewar | The Handover: How Bigwigs and Bureaucrats Transferred Canada's Best Publisher and the Best Part of our Literary Heritage to a Foreign Multinational | |
| 2017 | Carol Off | All We Leave Behind: A Reporter's Journey into the Lives of Others | |
| 2018 | Darrel J. McLeod | Mamaskatch: A Cree Coming of Age | |
| 2018 | Carys Cragg | Dead Reckoning: How I Came To Meet the Man Who Murdered My Father | |
| 2018 | Aida Edemariam | The Wife’s Tale: A Personal History | |
| 2018 | Terese Marie Mailhot | Heart Berries | |
| 2018 | Abu Bakr Al-Rabeeah and Winnie Yeung | Homes: A Refugee Story | |
| 2019 | Don Gillmor | To the River: Losing My Brother | |
| 2019 | Brian Harvey | Sea Trial: Sailing After My Father | |
| 2019 | Naomi K. Lewis | Tiny Lights for Travellers | |
| 2019 | Alan Walker | Fryderyk Chopin: A Life and Times | |
| 2019 | Dan Werb | City of Omens: A Search for the Missing Women of the Borderlands | |

=== 2020s ===
Governor General's Award for English-language non-fiction winners, 2020-2029
| Year | Author | Title | Ref |
|---|---|---|---|
| 2020 | Madhur Anand | This Red Line Goes Straight to Your Heart | |
| 2020 | Billy-Ray Belcourt | A History of My Brief Body | |
| 2020 | Ivan Coyote | Rebent Sinner | |
| 2020 | Amanda Leduc | Disfigured: On Fairy Tales, Disability and Making Space | |
| 2020 | Tessa McWatt | Shame on Me | |
| 2021 | Sadiqa de Meijer | alfabet/alphabet: a memoir of a first language | |
| 2021 | Larry Audlaluk | What I Remember, What I Know: The Life of a High Arctic Exile | |
| 2021 | Jenna Butler | Revery: A Year of Bees | |
| 2021 | Ivan Coyote | Care of: Letters, Connections, and Cures | |
| 2021 | J. B. MacKinnon | The Day the World Stops Shopping | |
| 2022 | Eli Baxter | Aki-wayn-zih: A Person as Worthy as the Earth | |
| 2022 | Rebecca Donner | All the Frequent Troubles of Our Days: The True Story of the American Woman at the Heart of the German Resistance to Hitler | |
| 2022 | Robyn Maynard and Leanne Betasamosake Simpson | Rehearsals for Living | |
| 2022 | Rowan McCandless | Persephoneʼs Children: A Life in Fragments | |
| 2022 | Britt Wray | Generation Dread: Finding Purpose in an Age of Climate Crisis | |
| 2023 | Kyo Maclear | Unearthing | |
| 2023 | Holly Hogan | Message in a Bottle | |
| 2023 | Monia Mazigh | Gendered Islamophobia: My Journey with a Scar(f) | |
| 2023 | Harrison Mooney | Invisible Boy | |
| 2023 | Angela Sterritt | Unbroken: My Fight for Survival, Hope, and Justice for Indigenous Women and Girls | |
| 2024 | Niigaan Sinclair | Wînipêk: Visions of Canada from an Indigenous Centre | |
| 2024 | Helen Knott | Becoming a Matriarch | |
| 2024 | Petra Molnar | The Walls Have Eyes: Surviving Migration in the Age of Artificial Intelligence | |
| 2024 | Danny Ramadan | Crooked Teeth: A Queer Syrian Refugee Memoir | |
| 2024 | Astra Taylor | The Age of Insecurity: Coming Together as Things Fall Apart | |
| 2025 | Claire Cameron | How to Survive a Bear Attack | |
| 2025 | Shane Neilson | What to Feel, How to Feel: Lyric Essays on Neurodivergence and Neurofatherhood | |
| 2025 | Vinh Nguyen | The Migrant Rain Falls in Reverse | |
| 2025 | Ruby Smith Dίaz | Searching for Serafim: The Life and Legacy of Serafim “Joe” Fortes | |
| 2025 | Teresa Wong | All Our Ordinary Stories: A Multigenerational Family Odyssey | |
| 2026 | Trina Moyles | Black Bear: A Story of Siblinghood and Survival | |
| 2026 | Greg Mercer | The Lobster Trap: The Global Fight for a Seafood on the Brink | |
| 2026 | Adrian Sutherland | The Work of Our Hands: A Cree Meditation on the Real World | |
| 2026 | Saeed Teebi | You Will Not Kill Our Imagination: A Memoir of Palestine and Writing in Dark Times | |
| 2026 | Miriam Toews | A Truce That Is Not Peace | |
