= British Columbia's National Award for Canadian Non-Fiction =

British Columbia's National Award for Canadian Non-fiction was a Canadian literary award. Awarded annually since 2005 by the British Columbia Achievement Foundation, it was the largest non-fiction prize in Canada, rising from $25,000 in its initial years to $40,000 in 2008. Despite being presented by a BC-based organization, the award was not limited to writers from British Columbia, and instead was open to all non-fiction work by Canadian writers.

In May 2018, the British Columbia Achievement Foundation announced that it was discontinuing the award as part of a process of refocusing the foundation's activities and programs.

== Winners ==
| Year | Winner | Nominated |
|---|---|---|
| 2005 | Patrick Lane, There Is a Season | Jane Jacobs, Dark Age Ahead; Harry Thurston, A Place Between the Tides: A Naturalist's Reflections on the Salt Marsh; Ronald Wright, A Short History of Progress |
| 2006 | Rebecca Godfrey, Under the Bridge: The True Story of the Murder of Reena Virk | J. B. MacKinnon, Dead Man in Paradise; John Terpstra, The Boys, or Waiting for the Electrician's Daughter; John Vaillant, The Golden Spruce: A True Story of Myth, Madness and Greed |
| 2007 | Noah Richler, This Is My Country, What's Yours?: A Literary Atlas of Canada | Marian Botsford Fraser, Requiem for My Brother; Gerta Moray, Unsettling Encounters: First Nations Imagery in the Art of Emily Carr; Dragan Todorovic, The Book of Revenge: A Blues for Yugoslavia |
| 2008 | Lorna Goodison, From Harvey River: A Memoir of My Mother and Her Island | Donald Harman Akenson, Some Family: The Mormons and How Humanity Keeps Track of Itself; Jacques Poitras, Beaverbrook: A Shattered Legacy |
| 2009 | Russell Wangersky, Burning Down the House: Fighting Fires and Losing Myself | Daphne Bramham, The Secret Lives of Saints: Child Brides and Lost Boys in Canada's Polygamous Mormon Sect; Mary Henley Rubio, Lucy Maud Montgomery: The Gift of Wings; Christopher Shulgan, The Soviet Ambassador: The Making of the Radical Behind Perestroika |
| 2010 | Ian Brown, The Boy in the Moon: A Father's Search for His Disabled Son | Karen Connelly, Burmese Lessons: A Love Story; Eric Siblin, The Cello Suites: J.S. Bach, Pablo Casals, and the Search for a Baroque Masterpiece; Kenneth Whyte, The Uncrowned King: The Sensational Rise of William Randolph Hearst |
| 2011 | John Vaillant, The Tiger: A True Story of Vengeance and Survival | Stevie Cameron, On the Farm: Robert William Pickton and the Tragic Story of Vancouver's Missing Women; James FitzGerald, What Disturbs Our Blood: A Son's Quest to Redeem the Past; Charles Foran, Mordecai: The Life & Times |
| 2012 | Charlotte Gill, Eating Dirt: Deep Forests, Big Timber, and Life with the Tree-Planting Tribe | Brian Fawcett, Human Happiness; Andrew Westoll, The Chimps of Fauna Sanctuary: A Canadian Story of Resilience and Recovery; Joel Yanofsky, Bad Animals: A Father's Accidental Education in Autism |
| 2013 | Modris Eksteins, Solar Dance: Genius, Forgery and the Crisis of Truth in the Modern Age | George Bowering, Pinboy; Robert R. Fowler, A Season in Hell: My 130 Days In the Sahara With Al Qaeda; Candace Savage, A Geography of Blood: Unearthing Memory from a Prairie Landscape |
| 2014 | Thomas King, The Inconvenient Indian: A Curious Account of Native People in North America | Carolyn Abraham, The Juggler's Children: A Journey into Family, Legend and the Genes that Bind Us; J. B. MacKinnon, The Once and Future World: Nature As It Was, As It Is, As It Could Be; Margaret MacMillan, The War That Ended Peace: The Road to 1914; Graeme Smith, The Dogs Are Eating Them Now: Our War in Afghanistan |
| 2015 | Karyn L. Freedman, One Hour in Paris: A True Story of Rape and Recovery | Chantal Hébert and Jean Lapierre, The Morning After: The 1995 Quebec Referendum and The Day That Almost Was; Alison Pick, Between Gods: A Memoir; James Raffan, Circling the Midnight Sun: Culture and Change in the Invisible Arctic |
| 2016 | Rosemary Sullivan, Stalin's Daughter: The Extraordinary and Tumultuous Life of Svetlana Alliluyeva | John Ibbitson, Stephen Harper; Emily Urquhart, Beyond the Pale: Folklore, Family, and the Mystery of Our Hidden Genes; Sheila Watt-Cloutier, The Right to be Cold: One Woman's Story of Protecting her Culture, the Arctic and the Whole Planet |
| 2017 | Sandra Martin, A Good Death: Making the Most of Our Final Choices | Taras Grescoe, Shanghai Grand: Forbidden Love and International Intrigue on the Eve of the Second World War; Robert Moor, On Trails: An Exploration; Alexandra Shimo, Invisible North: The Search for Answers on a Troubled Reserve |
| 2018 | Carol Off, All We Leave Behind: A Reporter's Journey Into the Lives of Others | Ken Dryden, Game Change: The Life and Death of Steve Montador and the Future of Hockey; Doug Saunders, Maximum Canada: Why 35 Million Canadians Are Not Enough; Tanya Talaga, Seven Fallen Feathers: Racism, Death, and Hard Truths in a Northern City |
