= IJMS =

IJMS may refer to:

- International Journal of Mass Spectrometry
- International Journal of Molecular Sciences
- International Journal of Mormon Studies
- International Journal of Motorcycle Studies
- Iranian Journal of Medical Sciences
- Indian Journal of Geo-Marine Sciences
- The Interim Joint Tactical Information Distribution System (JTIDS) Message Specification (IJMS) used by the Joint Tactical Information Distribution System
