= Ross Munro =

Ross Munro may refer to:

- Ross Munro (journalist) (1913—1990), Canadian war correspondent
- Ross Munro (footballer) (born 2000), Scottish footballer
