= William Sclater =

William Sclater may refer to:

- William Sclater (priest) (1575–1626), English clergyman and controversialist
- William Sclater (writer) (1906–1980), Scottish-Canadian journalist and naval officer
- William Lutley Sclater (1863–1944), British zoologist and museum director
