= Dragan Todorović =

Dragan Todorović may refer to:

- Dragan Todorović (politician) (born 1953), Serbian politician
- Dragan Todorović (writer) (born 1958), Yugoslav writer, journalist, and artist
