= Bill Waiser =

Canadian historian

Bill Waiser CM SOM FRSC
- Born: William Andrew Waiser; 1953 (age 72–73)

Academic background
- Education: Trent University; University of Saskatchewan
- Thesis: Rambler (1983)

Academic work
- Discipline: History
- Sub-discipline: Canadian history
- Institutions: University of Saskatchewan
- Main interests: History of Western and Northern Canada
- Website: billwaiser.com

William Andrew "Bill" Waiser CM SOM FRSC (born 1953) is a Canadian historian and author specializing in western and northern Canadian history.

== Career and honours ==
Waiser grew up in Toronto but developed an interest in western Canadian history through visiting his grandparents' Manitoba homestead each summer. His father had been a transient worker on the Prairies during the Great Depression before settling in Ontario after the Second World War. Waiser studied history at Trent University under renowned Manitoba historian W. L. Morton. Waiser completed his graduate work at the University of Saskatchewan (U of S), earning his master's in 1976 and doctorate in 1983. He was Yukon Historian for the Canadian Parks Service before joining the Department of History at the U of S in 1984. He served as department head from 1995 to 1998.

Waiser received the College of Arts and Science Teaching Excellence Award in 2003 and was named the university's Distinguished Researcher at the spring 2004 convocation. He was awarded the Saskatchewan Order of Merit, the province's highest honour, in 2006, and elected a fellow of the Royal Society of Canada the following year. Bill retired from the university in 2014. He was invested as a Member of the Order of Canada in 2018. The same year, he was awarded the Royal Society's J. B. Tyrrell Historical Medal, the first U of S historian to receive the honour since A. S. Morton in 1941. He also received the Pierre Berton Award for achievement in popular history in 2018. In 2020, Waiser was honoured with a lifetime achievement award for Prairie history by the Canadian Historical Association (CHA). In 2021, he won the Cheryl and Henry Kloppenburg Award for Literary Excellence for his impact on writing in Saskatchewan, for which the nominator wrote, "I think he is one of Saskatchewan's most important and accomplished writers."

Waiser's books have won numerous awards. All Hell Can't Stop Us: The On-to-Ottawa Trek and Regina Riot won the 2003 Saskatchewan Book Award (SBA) for non-fiction. His centennial history of Saskatchewan, Saskatchewan: A New History, won the CHA's 2006 Clio Prize as the best book in Prairie History. A World We Have Lost: Saskatchewan Before 1905 won the 2016 Governor General's Literary Award for Non-Fiction as well as that year's SBA non-fiction award. He had previously been nominated for the award in 1997 for Loyal till Death: Indians and the North-West Rebellion, co-written with Blair Stonechild.

In 2023, Waiser had his first children's book published through Thistledown Press. Gordie's Skate tells the story of hockey legend Gordie Howe's family acquiring a pair of skates during the Great Depression in Saskatchewan.

== Selected works ==
- Gordie's Skate (Saskatoon: Thistledown Press, 2023)
- In Search of Almighty Voice: Resistance and Reconciliation (Markham: Fifth House Publishers, 2020)
- A World We Have Lost: Saskatchewan Before 1905 (Markham: Fifth House Publishers, 2016)
- Tommy's Team: The People Behind the Douglas Years, with Stuart Houston (Calgary: Fifth House Publishers, 2010)
- Who Killed Jackie Bates? Murder and Mercy during the Great Depression (Calgary: Fifth House Publishers, 2008)
- Saskatchewan: A New History (Calgary: Fifth House Publishers, 2005)
- All Hell Can't Stop Us: The On-to-Ottawa Trek and Regina Riot (Calgary: Fifth House Publishers, 2003)
- Loyal till Death: Indians and the North-West Rebellion, with Blair Stonechild (Calgary: Fifth House Publishers, 1997)
- Park Prisoners: The Untold Story of Western Canada's National Parks (Saskatoon: Fifth House Publishers, 1995)
- Saskatchewan's Playground: A History of Prince Albert National Park (Saskatoon: Fifth House Publishers, 1989)

Awards
Preceded by Mark L. Winston	Governor General's Award for English-language non-fiction 2016	Succeeded by Graeme Wood
Preceded by Michael D. Behiels	J. B. Tyrrell Historical Medal; 2018	Succeeded by Allan Greer
