= List of chiefs of Fort Albany First Nation =

This is a list of chiefs of Fort Albany, including the chiefs that have governed Fort Albany First Nation since the establishment of a reserve on the territory in 1909, as well as their councils.

== Indian Act (1909–1977) ==
A band council was established for the Fort Albany First Nation, following the Indian Act.

Date of selection	Chief	Councillors	Notes	Ref
1909	Andrew Wesley			
July 1920	Moses Wesley	S. Ruben; J. N. Scott; J. Spence; D. Wesley	From 1918, J. Nakogee Scott was the representative of the people who would later be formally known as the Attawapiskat First Nation.^{:27}	
July 1923	Moses Wesley	Patrick Steven[sic]; Xavier Spence; David Solomon		
July 26, 1926	Moses Wesley	Patrick Stephen[sic]; Xavier Spence; Xavier Chookomoolin; David Solomon	From 23 July 1923, Xavier Chookomoolin was the Attawapiskat representative, and later became the first Indian Act chief of Attawapiskat First Nation.^{:27}	
July 16, 1929	Isiah Nashootaway (Sutherland)	Xavier Scott; James Sutherland; Alex Lazarus		
1933	Moses Wesley	Xavier Scott; James Sutherland; Alex Lazarus		
1938	Walter Stephen	Xavier Scott; James Sutherland; Alex Lazarus		
July 1947	Simeon Scott	James Sutherland; James Wesley; Willie Stephens		
July 30, 1951	Simeon Scott	Joel Linklater; James Sutherland; Fred Lazarus		
July 29, 1957	James Wesley	Gaius Wesley; Simon Koosees; Alex Lazarus		
June 17, 1960	James Wesley	Simon Koosees; Gaius Wesley; Alex Lazarus; James Sutherland; Simeon Metatawbin; Louis Nakochee; Xavier Sutherland		
August 12, 1964	Abraham Metatawabin	Willie Stephen; Gaius Wesley; Willie Wesley Sr.; Raphael Wheesk; Moses Nakogee; John Wheesk; Xavier Sutherland		
July 28, 1967	James Wesley	Simon[sic] Friday; Evadney Friday; Fred Lazarus; Labius Reuben; Mary Solomon; Willie Stephen; David Wynne Jr.; Hosea Wynne; Joshua Wynne		
August 27, 1969	William Stephen	Silas Wesley; John A. Wesley; Xavier Sutherland; Sinclair Wynne; Clifford Wesley; Alex Goodwin; Claudius Hughie; James Solomon; Lawrence Mark; Philip Tookata; Abraham Metatawabin[sic]; John Nakochee		
June 15, 1971	William Wesley Sr.	Silas Wesley; John A. Wesley; Alex Wesley; Philip Hughie; Mathias Wynne; Fred Lazarus Sr.; George Wesley; Simon Friday; Lawrence Mark; Philip Tookata; Moses Nakogee; Gilbert Solomon	Lawrence Mark resigned January 17, 1972. Moses Nakogee resigned May 16, 1972.	
June 15, 1973	John Nakogee	Simeon Friday; James Wesley; Evadney Friday; Josephine Wesley; Sinclair Wynne; Bertie Wynne; Fred Lazarus Sr.; Sinclair Williams; Abraham Wynne; Abraham Metat[sic]; Peter Sutherland; Edmund Metat		
June 24, 1975	Silas Wesley	Simeon Friday; Alex Goodwin; John Wesley; George Wesley; Bartholomew Sutherland; Sinclair Wynne; Peter Sackanay; Daisy Sackanay; Abraham Metatawabin[sic]; John Kataquabit; Joseph Kataquabit; Lawrence Mark	This was the last band council before the official split between the Fort Albany and Kaschechewan First Nations, from 1977 onwards, each community had its own band council.	

== Following split with Kashechewan (1977–2022) ==
Kashechewan First Nation began having its own band council in 1977.

Date of Selection	Chief	Councillors		Notes	Ref
June 21, 1977	John Nakogee	Edmond Edwards; Michel Nakochee; Harry Loone; Louis Nakogee; Antoine Koostachin; Gilbert Solomon			
June 21, 1979	Alex Metatawabin	Lawrence Mark; John Scott; Harry Loone; John Edwards; Joseph Kataquapit; Peter Sackanay		Chief Alex Metatawabin was removed February 24, 1980, and replaced in a by-election.	
March 3, 1980	Louie[sic] Nakogee	Lawrence Mark; John Scott; Harry Loone; John Edwards; Joseph Kataquapit; Peter Sackanay		Chief Alex Metatawabin was removed February 24, 1980, and replaced in a by-election.	
June 2, 1981	Alex Metatawabin	Daniel Edwards; Xavier Sutherland; Louis Nakogee Jr.; Edmund Edwards; Joseph Sutherland; Micheline Edwards			
July 16, 1983	Louie[sic] Nakogee Sr.	Daniel Edwards; Louis Nakogee Jr.; Abraham Matatawabin[sic]; Harry Loone; Joseph Wheesk; Marius Spence			
February 27, 1985	Simeon Solomon	William Sutherland; Peter Sutherland; John Paul Nakochee; Gabriel Loone; Ignace Kataquapit; Marius Spence		Gabriel Loone and Marius Spence resigned in September 1985, and were replaced by Peter Nakogee and David Sutherland in a by-election on September 11, 1985. Peter Nakogee then resigned on May 13, 1986.	
August 13, 1986	Louie Nakogee Jr.	Antoine Koostachin; Joseph Wheesk; Annabella Solomon; Marius Spence; Ignace Kataquapit; Joseph Sutherland; Peter Nakogee			
July 6, 1988	Edmund Metatawabin	William Sutherland; Peter Sutherland; Gilbert Solomon; Gisele Kataquapit; Lucie Solomon; Rita Scott; Patricia Edwards		William Sutherland and Rita Scott resigned during their time on Council, and were replaced by David Sutherland and George Sackanay in a by-election on May 21, 1989.	
July 6, 1990	Edmund Metatawabin	Peter Sutherland; Leo Loon; Gabriel Sutherland; Joseph Sutherland; George Scott; Ernest Edwards; Michel Solomon			
July 13, 1992	Edward Metatawabin	Joseph Wheesk; Gabriel Sutherland; Leo Loon; Bernard Sutherland; Emile Sutherland; Marius Spence; Annabella Solomon			
1994	Edmund Metatawabin			Edmund Metatawabin was still chief in 1994 and 1995.	
July 2, 1996	Arthur Scott			Within a few months of Scott's election, a petition calling for his removal as chief was signed by 186 people. On September 5, 1996, some members of the band held a "custom election", according to The Nation, "a show of hands to select a new chief." 95 people voted in the "custom election" and elected Bernard Sutherland as chief. Scott refused to step down, and did not recognize the "custom election".	
1998	Mike Metatawabin				
Date of Selection	Chief	Deputy Chief	Councillors	Notes	Ref
2010			Robert Nakogee		
July 28, 2012	Rex Knapaysweet		Robert Nakogee		
2014		Robert Nakogee			
2016		Robert Nakogee			
August 13, 2018	Leo Metatawabin	Robert Nakogee	Edmond Sackaney (Head Councillor); Joseph Scott; Joseph Sutherland; Margaret Edwards; Yvonne Metatawabin; Jackie Kataquapit; Ruby Edwards-Wheesk		
August 23, 2020	Robert Nakogee	Charlotte Nakoochee	Joseph Scott; Joseph Sutherland; Edmond Edwards; Xavier Inishinapay; Joseph Pascal Spence; Angela Diane Lagasse; Arthur Nakogee		

== Custom Election Code (2022–present) ==
A referendum of the First Nation's members on June 13, 2022 approved a Custom Election Code, with 22 of 39 votes cast in favour of the code. This Custom Election Code replaces the electoral process laid out in the Indian Act. The 2022 election was the first election in Fort Albany held under the custom code.

Date of Selection	Chief	Deputy Chief	Councillors	Notes	Ref
October 1, 2022	Elizabeth Kataquapit	Terry Metatawabin	Brenda Scott; Pascal Spence; Joseph Scott; Ruby Edward-Wheesk; Madeline Scott; Christopher Metatawabin; Madeline Nakogee	Elizabeth Kataquapit was the First Nation's first elected female chief.	
