= This Red Line Goes Straight to Your Heart =

Book by Madhur Anand

- 2020 paperback edition
- Author: Madhur Anand
- Audio read by: Ellora Patnaik; Asha Vijayasingham; Raoul Bhaneja; Strange Light
- Cover artist: Terri Nimmo
- Language: English
- Genre: Non-fiction
- Published: June 30, 2020
- Publisher: Strange Light / Penguin Random House Canada
- Publication place: Canada
- Media type: Print: Paperback; Digital: Audiobook, eBook
- Pages: 320
- Awards: Governor General’s Literary Award
- ISBN: 9780771007774
- Website: penguinrandomhouse.ca

This Red Line Goes Straight to Your Heart: A Memoir in Halves is a nonfiction book written by Canadian author Madhur Anand, and published in June 2020 by Strange Light / Penguin Random House Canada. The memoir is a generational account of three families and was written by Anand to gain a better understanding of her parents. It won the 2020 Governor General's Literary Award for English-language non-fiction.

== Backstory ==
The book is a memoir and an account of three generations of a South Asian Canadian family as told through the lens of history, science, and poetry. Anand wrote it to help her gain a better understanding of her parents.

== Synopsis ==
This Red Line Goes Straight to Your Heart, is a memoir split into two halves. The first half of the book is the story of a Punjabi couple who immigrated to Canada during Partition, raising their children in mining towns and living in crowded city apartments. The second half, tells the tale of the daughter braving racism and sexism while pursuing a career as a poet and an ecologist.

== Awards ==
This Red Line Goes Straight to Your Heart received the 2020 Governor General’s Literary Award for English-language non-fiction.

== Reception ==
Anand's book was generally well received. Canadian book reviewer Barb Minett writes in Bookshelf, "Its strange beauty embodies human frailties and resilience." Andreae Callanan in Canadian Notes and Queries commented, "This Red Line Goes Straight to Your Heart is intimate, elegant, and audacious in its fundamental question of where our stories begin and end."
