= Robert MacGregor Dawson =

Canadian political scientist (1895–1958)

Robert MacGregor Dawson FRSC
- Born: 1 March 1895; Bridgewater, Nova Scotia, Canada
- Died: 16 July 1958 (aged 63); Bridgewater, Nova Scotia, Canada
- Other name: R. MacGregor Dawson
- Spouse: Sarah Ada Foster

Academic background
- Education: Dalhousie University; Harvard University; London School of Economics
- Thesis: The Principle of Official Independence

Academic work
- Discipline: Political science
- Institutions: University of Saskatchewan; University of Toronto
- Notable students: Gordon Robertson
- Notable works: The Government of Canada (1947–1970)

Robert MacGregor Dawson FRSC (1895–1958) was a Canadian political scientist who served as Professor of Political Economy at the University of Toronto. He is best known as coauthor with Norman Ward of the 1947 textbook The Government of Canada.

Born on 1 March 1895 in Bridgewater, Nova Scotia, Dawson received a Bachelor of Arts degree in 1915 and a master's degree in 1916 from Dalhousie University. During that time, he served locally with the 1st "Halifax" Regiment, Royal Canadian Garrison Artillery. He received a Master of Arts degree from Harvard University in 1917 and Master of Science and Doctor of Science degrees in economics from the University of London (where he studied at the London School of Economics) in 1921 and 1922 respectively.

In 1921, he started teaching at Dalhousie University before leaving to teach at the Carnegie Institute of Technology and Rutgers University. In 1928, he returned to Canada as head of the political science department at the University of Saskatchewan. In 1937, he started teaching at the University of Toronto. He left in 1951 to write a biography of Prime Minister of Canada William Lyon Mackenzie King. He finished the first volume before his death in Bridgewater NS, in 1958.

He was married to Sarah Ada Foster (1896–1969). They had two sons: Robert MacGregor Dawson (1927–2000; Carnegie Professor of English, University of King's College (Dalhousie University), Halifax, NS) and William Foster Dawson (1930–2011; Professor Emeritus of Political Science, University of Western Ontario, London, ON). Dawson died on 16 July 1958.

In 1975, he was named a Person of National Historic Significance.

== See also ==
- James Eayrs

Professional and academic associations
Preceded by K. W. Taylor	President of the Canadian; Political Science Association; 1945–1946	Succeeded by F. A. Knox
Awards
Preceded by Frederick Philip Grove	Governor General's Award for English-language non-fiction 1947; With: William Sclater	Succeeded by Thomas H. Raddall
Preceded by Arthur R. M. Lower	Governor General's Award for English-language non-fiction 1947; With: William Sclater	Succeeded by C. P. Stacey
Preceded by Thomas H. Raddall	Governor General's Award for English-language non-fiction 1949; With: Hugh MacLennan	Succeeded by Marjorie Wilkins Campbell
Preceded by C. P. Stacey	Governor General's Award for English-language non-fiction 1949; With: Hugh MacLennan	Succeeded by W. L. Morton
