= 1947 Governor General's Awards =

Canadian literary award

The 1947 Governor General's Awards for Literary Merit were the 12th rendition of the Governor General's Awards, Canada's annual national awards program which then comprised literary awards alone. The awards recognized Canadian writers for new English-language works published in Canada during 1947 and were presented early in 1948. There were no cash prizes.

As every year from 1942 to 1948, there two awards for non-fiction, and four awards in the three established categories, which recognized English-language works only.

== Winners ==
- Fiction: Gabrielle Roy, The Tin Flute
- Poetry or drama: Dorothy Livesay, Poems for People
- Non-fiction: William Sclater, Haida
- Non-fiction: R. MacGregor Dawson, The Government of Canada
