= Charles Foran =

Canadian writer in Toronto, Ontario

Charles Foran CM
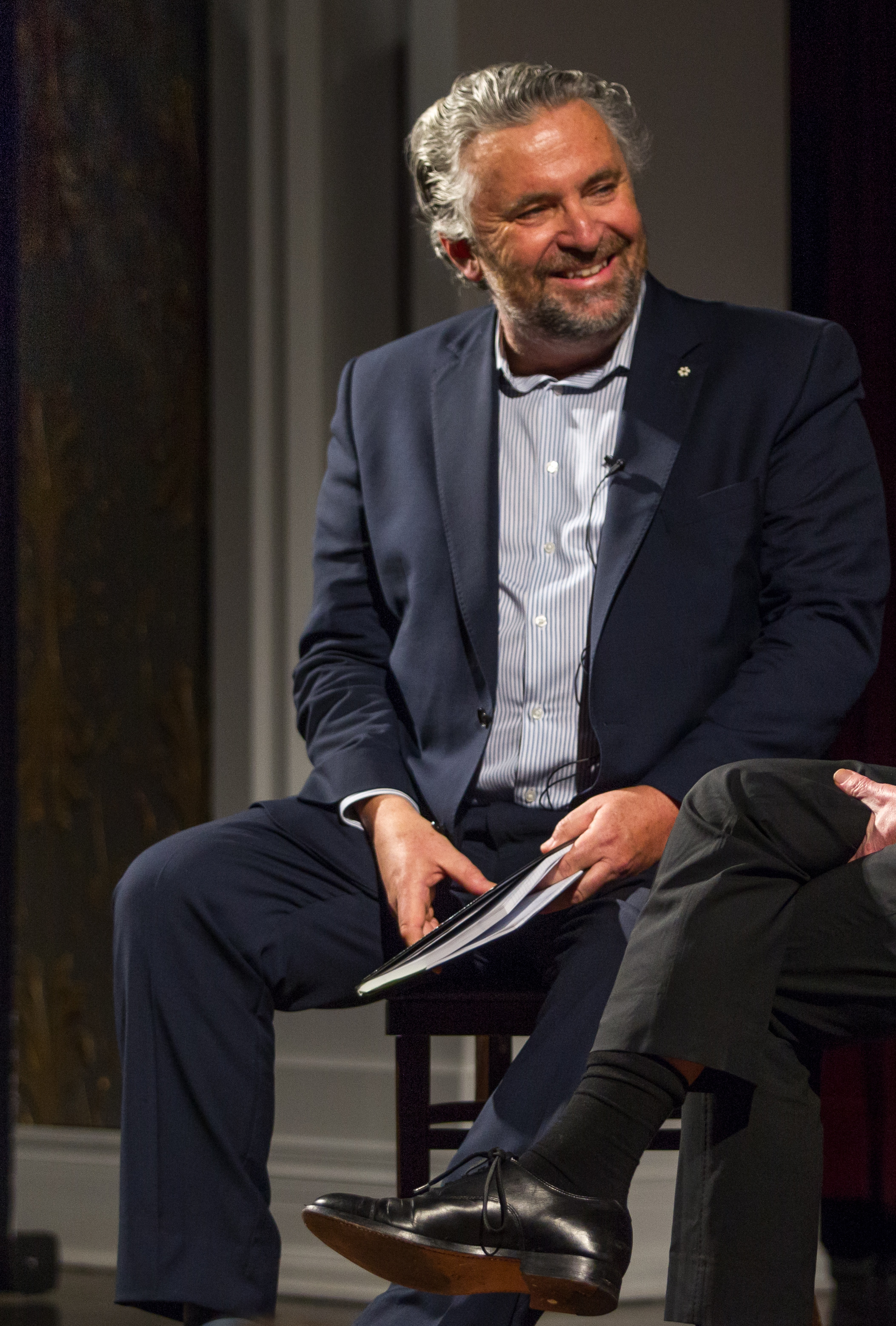
- Born: Toronto, Ontario
- Occupation: Author
- Writing career
- Period: 1990s-present
- Notable works: Carolan's Farewell, House on Fire, Mordecai: The Life & Times
- Website: charlesforan.com

Charles William Foran CM (born August 2, 1960) is a Canadian writer in Toronto, Ontario.

== Life and career ==
Foran was born in August 1960 in Toronto, Ontario to a Franco-Ontarian mother and a father from an Ottawa Irish family. He attended Catholic elementary school and Brebeuf College School, a Jesuit high school in North York. At St. Michael's College, University of Toronto, Foran studied English literature and history. After two years in Dublin, where he completed a Master's in Irish Literature at University College, Dublin, he and his wife lived for a period outside New York City. In 1988 they relocated to Beijing, China, where Foran taught at a university and witnessed the 1989 Tiananmen Square protests and massacre.

Coming Attractions, an annual book highlighting new writers, published several of his early stories in 1987. In 1992 his short-story "Boy Under Water" was included in Best Canadian Stories.

Sketches in Winter, published by HarperCollins Canada in 1992, chronicled the aftermath of the June 4 massacre in Beijing from the perspective of a group of Beijing intellectuals.

In 1994 Foran published his first novel, Kitchen Music, set in Ireland, Canada and Vietnam. It was short-listed for the Books in Canada First Novel Award. Then living in Montreal, Foran was a contributing editor to Saturday Night, writing regularly on Quebec, and books columnist for the Montreal Gazette.

The Last House of Ulster appeared in 1995, the year Foran relocated with his family to Peterborough, Ontario. It told the story of The Troubles from the point of view of a North Belfast family. Shortlisted for the Governor General's Award, the book won the QSPELL Award for best work of non-fiction by a Quebec writer. He was awarded the QSPELL again in 1997 for his second novel, Butterfly Lovers, a story set in Montreal and Beijing. He and his family spent 1997–1998 in Hong Kong. A French translation of Butterfly Lovers appeared in 1999 under the title Amants.

The Story of My Life (so far), a book about childhood, was published by HarperCollins in 1998. The novel House on Fire followed in 2001. It takes place in a country modelled on Tibet, and in Hong Kong. In 2000 Foran contributed a chapter on Canada to The Rough Guide to World Music. He returned to China with his family in 2001, living there for two more years. As well as making documentaries for the CBC Radio program Ideas on subjects ranging from Asian martial arts cinema to Indian writing, he was on the organising committee for the Hong Kong International Literary Festival. In 2005 Foran published the novel Carolan's Farewell, set in 18th-century Ireland. That same year HarperCollins issued a 10th anniversary edition of The Last House of Ulster, with a new preface by the author.

In spring 2008 a collection of his travel and literary essays, Join the Revolution, Comrade, was published by Biblioasis. His sports, travel and literary journalism has been published in magazines and newspapers in Canada, the US, and the UK.

In 2006 Foran signed with Alfred A. Knopf Canada to write a biography of Mordecai Richler. The book, while not authorised, was written with the cooperation of the Richler family. Mordecai: The Life & Times was released in October 2010, and was named to many best-of-year lists. Mordecai Richler: The Last of the Wild Jews, a documentary film co-written by Foran and director Francine Pelletier, first aired on BRAVO TV in December 2010. In September 2011 the film was awarded a Gemini for best biography documentary.

In 2011 Mordecai: The Life & Times was short-listed for both the BC Foundation Non-Fiction Prize and the Charles Taylor Prize. It was awarded the Taylor Prize in Toronto in February 2011, and won the 2011 Hilary Weston Writers' Trust Prize for Nonfiction in October and the Governor General's Award for English-language non-fiction in November. The biography was also given a Canadian Jewish Book Prize. On November 15, 2011, the Globe and Mail declared Mordecai: The Life and Times "probably the single most awarded book of any genre in the history of Canadian literature."

In March 2011 Foran's short interpretive biography Maurice Richard, about the ice hockey player, was published by Penguin, as part of their Extraordinary Canadians series. In 2017, a documentary based on the book aired on CBC television.

Planet Lolita, his fifth novel, appeared in June 2014 with HarperCollins. The novel returns to contemporary Asia, the setting of two earlier works of fiction, to explore the digital age through the eyes of a teenage girl.

In April 2023, after nearly a decade of publishing only journalism and essays, including on post-nationalism in The Guardian and on a writer in mid-career in Canadian Notes & Queries, Foran released his twelfth book, the philosophical memoir Just Once, No More: On Fathers, Sons, and Who We Are Until We Are No Longer, published by Knopf Canada. It was named one of the best books of 2023 in The Globe and Mail.

Between 2013 and 2014 Foran taught courses in Irish literature at St. Michael's College at the University of Toronto. From Jan 2015 to Jan 2019 he was CEO of the Institute for Canadian Citizenship, an organisation committed to welcoming new Canadians through culture and advancing conversations about citizenship. Beginning in early 2020, he was the executive director of the Writers' Trust of Canada, a role he left at the end of 2023.

Foran was named to the Order of Canada in 2014. A former president of PEN Canada from 2011 until September 2013, he is a senior fellow at Massey College and an adjunct professor in the Department of English at the University of Toronto. In fall 2018 he was awarded the Writers' Trust Fellowship. His literary papers are housed in the archives at Bata Library, Trent University.

== Bibliography ==
Charles Foran talks about Mordecai on Bookbits radio.

- Sketches in Winter (1992)
- Kitchen Music (1994)
- The Last House of Ulster (1995)
- Butterfly Lovers (1996)
- The Story of My Life (So Far) (1998)
- House on Fire (2001)
- Carolan's Farewell (2005)
- Join the Revolution, Comrade (2008)
- Mordecai: The Life & Times (Toronto: Alfred A. Knopf Canada, 2010)
- Maurice Richard (Penguin Canada, Extraordinary Canadians Series, 2011)
- Planet Lolita (2014)
- Just Once, No More (2023)
