= Elspeth Cameron =

Canadian writer (1943–2025)

- Born: 10 January 1943; Barrie, Ontario, Canada
- Died: 13 August 2025 (aged 82); St. Catharines, Ontario, Canada
- Occupations: Writer, poet
- Known for: Biographies

Elspeth MacGregor Cameron (10 January 1943 – 13 August 2025) was a Canadian writer best known for her biographies of noted Canadian literary figures such as Irving Layton and Earle Birney. She was also noted for her 1997 memoir No Previous Experience, a memoir of her process of self-discovery when, having previously identified as heterosexual, she began to develop a sexual and romantic attraction to historian Janice Dickin McGinnis. She also published a volume of poetry.

Cameron lived in St. Catharines, Ontario. She taught at Concordia University, the University of Toronto and Brock University. She died in St. Catharines on 13 August 2025, at the age of 82.

== Awards ==
Her biography of Hugh MacLennan, Hugh MacLennan: A Writer's Life, was nominated for the Governor General's Award for English-language non-fiction at the 1981 Governor General's Awards. No Previous Experience won the W. O. Mitchell Literary Prize.

== Bibliography ==
- Hugh MacLennan: A Writer's Life (1981)
- A Spider Danced A Cosy Jig (1984)
- Irving Layton: A Portrait (1985)
- Robertson Davies: An Appreciation (1991)
- Earle Birney: A Life (1994)
- Great Dames (1997)
- No Previous Experience: A Memoir of Love and Change (1997)
- And Beauty Answers: The Life of Frances Loring and Florence Wyle (2007)
- Aunt Winnie (2013)
- A Tale of Two Divas: The Curious Adventures of Jean Forsyth and Edith J. Miller in Canada’s Edwardian West (2017)
