= Eric Siblin =

Canadian writer

Eric Siblin is a Canadian writer.

A former music critic for the Montreal Gazette, he is most noted for his 2009 book The Cello Suites: J.S. Bach, Pablo Casals, and the Search for a Baroque Masterpiece. The book won both the McAuslan First Book Prize and the Mavis Gallant Prize for Non-Fiction from the Quebec Writers' Federation Awards, and was a shortlisted finalist for the Governor General's Award for English-language non-fiction, the Writers' Trust Prize for Nonfiction and the B.C. National Award for Canadian Non-Fiction.

His second book, Studio Grace: The Making of a Record, was published in 2015. It chronicled his year-long effort to record and release an album of self-written songs with a group of session musicians, and was released concurrently with the album Songs from Studio Grace.

== Books ==
- The Cello Suites: J.S. Bach, Pablo Casals, and the Search for a Baroque Masterpiece (2009, ISBN 9780802145246)
- Studio Grace: The Making of a Record (2015, ISBN 9781770899346)

== Albums ==
- Songs from Studio Grace (2015)
