= 1975 Governor General's Awards =

Canadian literary award

Each winner of the 1975 Governor General's Awards for Literary Merit was selected by a panel of judges administered by the Canada Council for the Arts.

The council established four annual Canada Council Children's Literature Prizes in 1975, two each for children's book writers and illustrators, which remained outside the "Governor General's Awards" rubric through 1986. The Governor General's Award for Literary Merit encompassed as many as 8 annual awards until expansion to 14 in 1987. For Children's Literature Prize winners 1975 to 1986, see "Children's literature" (2) and "Children's illustration" (2) in the footer navigation box.

== Winners ==
=== English Language ===
- Fiction: Brian Moore, The Great Victorian Collection.
- Poetry or Drama: Milton Acorn, The Island Means Minago.
- Non-Fiction: Marion MacRae and Anthony Adamson, Hallowed Walls.

=== French Language ===
- Fiction: Anne Hébert, Les enfants du sabbat.
- Poetry or Drama: Pierre Perrault, Chouennes.
- Non-Fiction: Louis-Edmond Hamelin, Nordicité canadienne.
