= George Calef =

Canadian wildlife biologist, author and photographer

- Occupations: biologist, writer
- Writing career
- Period: 1970s-1990s
- Notable works: Caribou and the Barren-Lands

George Calef is a Canadian wildlife biologist, author and photographer, who won the Governor General's Award for English-language non-fiction at the 1981 Governor General's Awards for his nature book Caribou and the Barren-Lands.

Born in Los Angeles, California and educated at the University of British Columbia, Calef worked as a wildlife biology researcher in the Canadian Arctic, studying caribou for the governments of Canada and the Northwest Territories. In 1977, he testified before the Mackenzie Valley Pipeline Inquiry on the potential impact of the pipeline development on caribou habitat.

In the 1990s, he was a co-owner of Oldsquaw Lodge, a wilderness lodge off the Canol Road near the Northwest Territories-Yukon border.
