= Madhur Anand =

Canadian poet

- Born: Thunder Bay, Ontario
- Education: Western University, (BSc, PhD)
- Occupations: Writer, educator
- Employer: University of Guelph
- Notable work: This Red Line Goes Straight to Your Heart
- Awards: Governor General’s Literary Award
- Website: Madhur Anand

Madhur Anand is a Canadian poet and professor of ecology and environmental sciences. She was born in Thunder Bay, Ontario and lives in Guelph, Ontario.

== Scientific career ==
Anand completed her PhD in theoretical ecology at Western University in 1997. Her research focuses on ecological change and sustainability science, with particular attention to coupled human–environment systems and forest and forest–grassland mosaic ecosystems. She examines how sources of stress and disturbance, including agriculture and climate change, influence these systems across spatial and temporal scales. Her work incorporates mathematical and simulation modelling, statistical analysis, dendrochronology, and other observational methods.

Following her doctoral studies, Anand held postdoctoral fellowships at the University of Trieste, the Hebrew University of Jerusalem, Utrecht University and the University of New Mexico. She later served as a visiting professor at McGill University and Princeton University.

Anand is a full professor in the School of Environmental Sciences at the University of Guelph, where she has led the Global Ecological Change and Sustainability lab as a researcher for over 25 years. Over the course of her career, she has co-authored more than 190 peer-reviewed scientific publications.

She has held two Canada Research Chairs: the Canada Research Chair in Global Ecological Change at the University of Guelph and the Canada Research Chair in Biocomplexity of the Environment at Laurentian University. She has received the Ontario Premier's Research Excellence Award in Science and Technology, and the Ontario Distinguished Researcher Award from the Ontario Innovation Trust. Anand has received the YWCA Three Rivers Woman of Distinction, Indo-Canada Chamber of Commerce Female Professional of the Year, City of Guelph Top 40 Under 40, the Western University Young Alumni Award of Merit, and induction into the Thomas A. Blakelock Hall of Fame.

== Literary career ==
=== Poetry ===
Anand began writing poetry in 1996 while completing her doctoral thesis. Her literary work has been noted for its engagement with ecological science; Quill & Quire, for example, observed that her poetry is “informed by her scientific knowledge.”

Her poems have appeared in a range of Canadian literary magazines, including the Literary Review of Canada, The New Quarterly, The Malahat Review, Lemon Hound, The Rusty Toque, and The Walrus. Her work has also been included in the anthologies The Shape of Content: Creative Writing in Mathematics and Science and How a Poem Moves.

Her first poetry collection, A New Index for Predicting Catastrophes, was published by McClelland & Stewart in 2015. The collection received a starred review in Publishers Weekly and a nomination for the Trillium Book Award for Poetry in 2016. It was noted for its engagement with ecopoetry and for its use of found poems adapted from Anand’s scientific research. The CBC listed the collection among ten all-time “trailblazing” Canadian poetry collections. The New York Times highlighted Anand’s approach, drawing attention to “The Strategy of the Majority,” a poem adapted from her research on human–environment systems. That research later informed her work Prioritising COVID-19 vaccination in changing social and epidemiological landscapes, which used game theory to model vaccination prioritization strategies.

Her second poetry collection, Parasitic Oscillations, was published by Penguin Random House in 2022. It was named a CBC Top Pick for Poetry in Spring 2022 and selected as one of The Globe and Mail’s Top 100 Best Books of 2022.

=== Non-Fiction ===
Anand’s debut creative non-fiction book, This Red Line Goes Straight to Your Heart, received the Governor General's Award for English-language non-fiction at the 2020 Governor General's Awards. The book explores intra- and intergenerational perspectives, addressing subjects including the Partition of India and Anand’s experiences as a young scientist. The award jury commented that the book “blends science, personal narrative and fictional elements to push the non-fiction form into bold new territory.” Filmmaker Deepa Mehta described its shifting perspectives as “poetic and at times heartbreaking.”

=== Fiction ===
Anand began writing fiction in 2017. Her first submitted short story, "Hidden Fruit," won the Thomas Morton Memorial Prize. Her more recent short story, “Insects Eat Birds”, was selected by Lisa Moore for the Best Canadian Stories anthology in 2024.

Her debut novel, To Place a Rabbit, was published by Knopf Canada in 2025. The Globe and Mail, in its 2025 Spring Books Preview, described it as “Borgesian,” while CBC Books characterized it as “delightfully clever [and] artfully layered.” The Seaboard Review of Books described it as “bracingly original” and referred to Anand as “one of the more fearlessly adventurous writers working today.” The novel references Stendhal’s theories in On Love, Renè Girard's theory of mimetic desire, and incorporates, in part, a loose translation of Lisa Moore’s “La Traduction,” translated by Lise Dumasy. The novel was named a Best Book of 2025 by Globe and Mail and a Best Canadian Fiction book of 2025 by the Canadian Broadcasting Corporation.

=== Editorial ===
Anand has co-edited two volumes of poetry, Regreen: New Canadian Ecological Poetry, and Watch Your Head: Writers & Artists Respond to the Climate Crisis. She served as poetry editor for Canadian Notes and Queries from 2018 to 2022.

== Interdisciplinary Initiatives ==
Anand’s interdisciplinary work brings together environmental science, literature, and mathematics, with a focus on climate change, biodiversity, and human–environment systems. Her initiatives have emphasized collaboration across disciplinary boundaries and the development of new approaches to scientific communication and creative practice.

From 2015 to 2018, she served as director of the Waterloo Institute for Complexity and Innovation , where she organized interdisciplinary events including Living on the Precipice: Interdisciplinary Conference on Resilience in Complex Natural and Human Systems. The latter featured Nobel Laureate scientist and writer Roald Hoffman and Pulitzer Prize–winning poet Rae Armantrout and was covered in Rungh Magazine.

Between 2019 and 2023, Anand was the inaugural director of the Guelph Institute for Environmental Research. The institute aimed to address environmental challenges through interdisciplinary collaboration across the University of Guelph’s seven colleges. During this period, she established The Collaboratory, a group of scientists, artists, and writers focused on responding to environmental crises through collaborative research and creative practice.

In 2025, Anand was a fellow at the Montpellier Institute for Advanced Studies in France. In discussing multidisciplinary work, she stated: “Practicing multidisciplinarity isn't just a matter of spending time together. Each discipline has its own language, and we have to think of translations to get from one to the other, with interpreters, because we can't learn all the disciplinary languages.”

In an essay entitled "Angles Where the Grass Writing Goes On" published in The New Quarterly, issue 146, titled Falling in Love with Poetry, she wrote:

"To find one’s inner thoughts, hidden thoughts, planted, no, already lush and green, in another’s mind was mysterious and attractive. To be able to connect my personal experiences, and even unconscious memories, to remote biophysical phenomena foreshadowed my desire to know the world in more than one way."

== See also ==
- Canadian literature
- Canadian poetry
- List of Canadian poets
- List of Canadian writers
