= Earth and High Heaven =

Book by Gwethalyn Graham

- First US edition
- Author: Gwethalyn Graham
- Language: English
- Publisher: Jonathan Cape (UK); Thomas Nelson & Sons (Canada); J. B. Lippincott (US)
- Publication date: 1944
- Publication place: Canada
- Media type: Print (Hardback & Paperback)
- Pages: 228 pp (first edition, hardcover)

Earth and High Heaven was a 1944 novel by Gwethalyn Graham. It was the first Canadian novel to reach number one on The New York Times bestseller list and stayed on the list for 37 weeks, selling 125 000 copies in the United States that year.

Set in Montreal, Quebec during World War II, the novel portrays a romance between Erica Drake, a young woman from a wealthy Protestant family in Westmount, and Marc Reiser, a Jewish lawyer and soldier from Northern Ontario. The young lovers are forced to confront and overcome the antisemitism of their society in their quest to form a lasting relationship.

== Literary significance and criticism ==
Originally published by Jonathan Cape and Thomas Nelson & Sons (Canada), the most recent edition of the novel was published by Toronto's Cormorant Books in 2004. The book was released as a free public domain ebook in 2018 by the volunteer led Faded Page website.

John Moss wrote that except for the timeliness of the novel's publication, the quality of the writing would relegate it to the paperback section of drug store romances. In 1944, Germany's was resolving the Jewish question through death camps and antisemitism was high on the minds of Canadians. Moss claims that although the writing is adequate, the characters lack motivation and there is no awareness of psychological complexity. In conclusion, Moss says, "Her novel is important, ultimately for its failure; worth reading to understand the benign context in which bigotry can grow."

== Awards and nominations ==
Earth and High Heaven won the 1944 Governor General's Award for fiction, and the 1945 Anisfield-Wolf Book Award. It was also the ninth bestselling book of 1945 in the United States.

== Film, TV, and theatrical adaptations ==
Producer Samuel Goldwyn bought the movie rights to Earth and High Heaven for $100,000, intending for Katharine Hepburn to play Erica Drake. He initially hired Ring Lardner Jr. to adapt the screenplay.

Goldwyn was, however, dissatisfied with the results, telling Lardner that he "betrayed [him] by writing too much like a Jew." Goldwyn subsequently hired a succession of other writers to develop the script, and remained dissatisfied with the final product.

After Elia Kazan released the similarly themed Gentleman's Agreement in 1947, Goldwyn abandoned Earth and High Heaven rather than risk having it labeled by critics as a copy of Kazan's film.
