= 1945 Governor General's Awards =

Canadian literary award

The 1945 Governor General's Awards for Literary Merit were the 10th rendition of the Governor General's Awards, Canada's annual national awards program which then comprised literary awards alone. The awards recognized Canadian writers for new English-language works published in Canada during 1945 and were presented in 1946. There were no cash prizes.

As every year from 1942 to 1948, there two awards for non-fiction, and four awards in the three established categories, which recognized English-language works only.

== Winners ==
- Fiction: Hugh MacLennan, Two Solitudes
- Poetry or drama: Earle Birney, Now is Time
- Non-fiction: Evelyn M. Richardson, We Keep a Light
- Non-fiction: Ross Munro, Gauntlet to Overlord
