= N. J. Berrill =

English marine biologist (1903–1996)

Jack Berrill
- Born: Norman John Berrill; April 28, 1903; Bristol, U.K.
- Died: October 15, 1996 (aged 93); New Hampshire, U.S.
- Education: University of Bristol (BSc); University College London (PhD, DSc)
- Occupations: Marine biologist and author
- Writing career
- Period: 1928–1978
- Genres: Nature writing and science writing
- Subjects: Biology, marine biology, general science
- Notable works: Sex and the Nature of Things (1953); Man's Emerging Mind (1955); You and the Universe (1958); The Person in the Womb (1968)

Norman John "Jack" Berrill FRS FRSC (28 April 1903 – 15 October 1996) was an English marine biologist. He was born in Bristol and received his BSc degree from the University of Bristol in 1924 and his PhD (1929) and DSc (1931) from University College London. In 1928, he joined the faculty of McGill University in Montreal, where, from 1946 to 1965, he was Strathcona Professor of Zoology. On 20 March 1952, he was named a Fellow of the Royal Society. He was also a member of the Royal Society of Canada (1936) and the American Association for the Advancement of Science (1978).

Berrill wrote numerous books, including both works of popular science which were compared by some reviewers to books by Rachel Carson and Loren Eiseley, as well as textbooks and scientific monographs. Two of his titles, Man's Emerging Mind and Sex and the Nature of Things, won the Canadian Governor General's Award for English-language non-fiction. His 1950 monograph on tunicata is the definitive work on the subject.

Berrill received honorary doctorates from the universities of Windsor (1968), British Columbia (1972) and McGill (1973).

Berrill was married twice and had three children, raising his first child as a single parent after his first wife died. He co-wrote two books with his son and his second wife.

== Selected works ==
- The Tunicata, with an account of the British species (Ray Society, 1950)
- The Living Tide (Dodd, Mead, 1951)
- Journey into Wonder (Dodd, Mead, 1952)
- Sex and the Nature of Things (Dodd, Mead, 1953), winner of the Governor General's Award for English-language non-fiction
- The Origin of Vertebrates (Clarendon Press, 1955)
- Man's Emerging Mind (Dodd, Mead, 1955; reprinted by Oxford University Press, 2010), winner of the Governor General's Award for English-language non-fiction
- 1001 Questions Answered about the Seashore (with Jacquelyn Berrill) (Dodd, Mead, 1957; reprinted by Dover Books, 1976)
- You and the Universe (Dodd, Mead, 1958)
- Growth, Development and Pattern (W.H. Freeman, 1961)
- Worlds Without End (Macmillan, 1964)
- Inherit the Earth (Dodd, Mead, 1966)
- Biology In Action: A Beginning College Textbook (Dodd, Mead, 1966)
- The Life of the Ocean (McGraw-Hill, 1966)
- The Person in the Womb (McGraw-Hill, 1968)
- The Life of Sea Islands (with Michael Berrill) (McGraw-Hill, 1969)
- Developmental Biology (McGraw-Hill, 1971)
