= Marian Fowler =

Canadian literary scholar and biographer

Marian Fowler (née Little; October 15, 1929 – June 12, 2020) was a Canadian literary scholar and biographer who was best known for writing women's biographies.

== Early life ==
Fowler was born in Newmarket, Ontario, to Dorothy and Robert Little on October 15, 1929. After attending the University of Toronto, Fowler worked as a copywriter before marrying in 1953.

== Career ==
Fowler returned to the University of Toronto, where she earned an MA (1965) and a PhD (1970) which dealt with Jane Austen's novels. She worked as a professor of English literature at York University from 1971 to 1982.

Fowler won the 1983 Canadian Biography Award from the Association for Canadian Studies for her second published biography, Redney: A Life of Sara Jeannette Duncan (1983).

In a Gilded Cage: From Heiress to Duchess, a group biography, was nominated for the 1993 Governor General's Award for English-language non-fiction. In a Gilded Cage explores the lives of five American heiresses who married British aristocrats, specifically Consuelo Vanderbilt, Lily Spencer-Churchill, Duchess of Marlborough, Consuelo Montagu, Duchess of Manchester, Helena Keith-Falconer, Countess of Kintore, and May Goelet.

== Personal life ==
In 1953, she married Rodney Fowler, a cardiologist. They had two children before divorcing in 1978.

Fowler died in Toronto, Ontario, on June 12, 2020.

== Works ==
- The Embroidered Tent: Five Gentlewomen in Early Canada (1982, Anansi)
- Redney: A Life of Sara Jeannette Duncan (1983, Anansi)
- Below the Peacock Fan: First Ladies of the Raj (1987, Viking)
- Blenheim: Biography of a Palace (1989, Viking)
- In a Gilded Cage: From Heiress to Duchess (1994, St. Martin's)
- The Way She Looks Tonight: Five Women of Style (1996, St. Martin's)
- Hope: Adventures of a Diamond (2002)
