= Norah Story =

Canadian archivist (1902–1978)

Norah Story (1902 – March 5, 1978) was a Canadian archivist. She won the Governor General's Award for English-language non-fiction in 1967 for her Oxford Companion to Canadian History and Literature.

== Early life and education ==
Norah Story was born in England in 1902 and emigrated to Canada in 1912. After attending high school in Guelph, Ontario, Story earned a bachelor of arts in history at the University of Toronto in 1926. She completed a master of arts in 1927 at the University of Wisconsin.

== Career ==
In 1928, Story joined the Public Archives of Canada, where she directed the manuscripts division from 1942 to her retirement in 1960.

With Arthur Doughty, Story edited Documents Relating to the Constitutional History of Canada, 1819–1828 (1935), a collection of primary source documents about Canadian constitutional history.

Story was a classmate of the politician Paul Martin Sr. at University of St. Michael's College. When Martin was in the Senate, Story and Josephine Phelan worked with him on his memoirs. Story took his dictations, while Phelan reviewed and compiled his papers.

She died on March 5, 1978.

== Bibliography ==
- Doughty, Arthur; Story, Norah (1935). Documents Relating to the Constitutional History of Canada, 1819–1828. Ottawa: King's Printer.
- Story, Norah (1967). The Oxford Companion to Canadian History and Literature. Oxford University Press. OCLC 663686963.
