= Edgar McInnis =

Canadian poet and historian

- Born: July 26, 1899; Charlottetown, Prince Edward Island
- Died: September 28, 1973 (aged 74); Toronto, Ontario
- Occupations: historian, poet, academic
- Writing career
- Period: 1910s-1960s
- Notable works: The Unguarded Frontier, Oxford Periodical History of the War

Edgar Wardell McInnis (July 26, 1899 – September 28, 1973) was a Canadian poet and historian, best known for his Oxford Periodical History of the War, a six-volume year-by-year history of World War II, and for Canada: A Political and Social History, which was an important and influential textbook in Canadian history classes in its era. A longtime professor at the University of Toronto and York University, he was a two-time winner of the Governor General's Award for English-language non-fiction, winning for The Unguarded Frontier: A History of American-Canadian Relations at the 1942 Governor General's Awards and for The War: Fourth Year at the 1944 Governor General's Awards.

Originally from Charlottetown, Prince Edward Island, McInnis served as an artilleryman with the Canadian Expeditionary Force in France during World War I. Writing poetry in his spare time, he published the collections Poems Written at the Front (1918) and The Road to Arras (1920), and won the Newdigate Prize in 1925 for his poem "Byron". He completed a bachelor's degree in history at the University of Toronto in 1923. A Rhodes Scholar, he received a Bachelor of Arts degree in 1926 and a Master of Arts degree in 1930 from Oxford University. He taught history at the University of Toronto for several years before becoming executive director of the Canadian Institute of International Affairs in 1951. He joined York University in 1960, becoming the institution's dean of graduate studies in 1964.

He won the J. B. Tyrrell Historical Medal in 1966.

== Works ==
- Poems Written at the Front (1918)
- The Road to Arras (1920)
- The Unguarded Frontier: A History of American-Canadian Relations (1942)
- The War: First Year (1940)
- The War: Second Year (1941)
- The War: Third Year (1942)
- The War: Fourth Year (1943)
- The War: Fifth Year (1944)
- The War: Sixth Year (1945)
- North America and the Modern World (1945)
- Canada: A Political and Social History (1947)
- Canada at the United Nations (1953)
- The Commonwealth Today (1959)
- The Atlantic Triangle and the Cold War (1959)
- The Shaping of Postwar Germany (1960)
- The North American Nations (1963)
