= 1981 Governor General's Awards =

Canadian literary award

Each winner of the 1981 Governor General's Awards for Literary Merit was selected by a panel of judges administered by the Canada Council for the Arts.

The 1981 awards were the first time that separate awards were presented for poetry and drama, which had previously competed in a single "poetry or drama" category.

== English ==
Category	Winner	Nominated
Fiction	Mavis Gallant, Home Truths: Selected Canadian Stories	No advance shortlist was released for this category.
Non-fiction	George Calef, Caribou and the Barren-Lands	Claude Bissell, The Young Vincent Massey; Elspeth Cameron, Hugh MacLennan: A Writer's Life
Poetry	F. R. Scott, The Collected Poems of F. R. Scott	Alfred Bailey, Miramichi Lightning: Collected Poems; Barry McKinnon, The The
Drama	Sharon Pollock, Blood Relations	Charles Tidler, Straight Ahead and Blind Dancers; George F. Walker, Theatre of the Film Noir

== French ==
Category	Winner	Nominated
Fiction	Denys Chabot, La province lunaire	Noël Audet, Ah, l'amour l'amour; Aline Beaudin Beaupré, L'aventure de Blanche Morti; Louis Caron, Le canard de bois
Non-fiction	Madeleine Ouellette-Michalska, L'échappée des discours de l'oeil	Maurice Cusson, Délinquants pourquoi?; Andrée Pilon-Quiviger, L'éden éclaté
Poetry	Michel Beaulieu, Visages	No advance shortlist was released for this category.
Drama	Marie Laberge, C'était avant la guerre à l'anse à Gilles	Jean-Pierre Ronfard, Vie et mort du Roi Boiteux
