= Denys Chabot =

Canadian journalist and writer (1945–2025)

Denys Chabot (French: [dəni ʃabo]; February 9, 1945 – June 24, 2025) was a Canadian writer and journalist from Quebec. He was known for his novels L'Eldorado dans les glaces, which won the Prix Gibson in 1979, and La province lunaire, which won the Governor General's Award for French-language fiction at the 1981 Governor General's Awards. Eldorado on Ice, an English translation of L'Eldorado dans les glaces by David Lobdell, was also published in 1981. He subsequently published the children's book Mooz le petit orignal (1986) and the novel La Tête des eaux, then concentrated the rest of his career primarily on writing books about the history of Quebec's Abitibi-Témiscamingue region.

Chabot died on June 24, 2025, at the age of 80.

== Works ==
- L'Eldorado dans les glaces (1978)
- La Province lunaire (1981)
- Mooz le petit orignal (1986)
- Histoire de Val-d'Or des origines à 1995 (1995)
- La Tête des eaux (1997)
- L'Abitibi centenaire, 1898-1998 (1999)
- L'Abitibi minière (2002)
- Hector Authier, le père de l'Abitibi (2004)
- Le Village minier Bourlamaque (2009)
