= Ted Bishop =

Canadian writer

Edward L. Bishop
- Education: BA, MA, PhD
- Alma mater: University of Alberta, Queen's University
- Occupation(s): Professor, Department of English and Film Studies
- Employer: University of Alberta
- Notable work: Riding With Rilke
- Awards: Motorcycle Award of Excellence for best Motorcycle Book, Wilfred Eggleston Award for Non-Fiction (2006)

Edward L. Bishop is a Canadian writer and academic. A professor of English literature and film studies at the University of Alberta, his first non-academic publication was Riding with Rilke: Reflections on Motorcycles and Books, a travel memoir which was a Canadian bestseller in 2005 and a finalist for the 2005 Governor General's Award for English non-fiction, and won the MAX Award (Motorcycle Award of Excellence) for best Motorcycle Book and Wilfred Eggleston Award for Non-Fiction.

== Works ==
- Bishop, Edward (1989). A Virginia Woolf chronology. Macmillan. ISBN 978-0-333-38855-6.
- Bishop, Edward (1991). Virginia Woolf. Macmillan. ISBN 978-0-333-40754-7.
- Bishop, Edward L. (1992). "The subject in 'Jacob's Room". Modern Fiction Studies. 38 (1): 147–175. doi:10.1353/mfs.0.0724. S2CID 144787310.
- Bishop, Edward L. (1994). "Re: Covering Ulysses". Joyce Studies Annual. 5. University of Texas: 22–55.
- Bishop, Edward L. (1998). "The 'Garbled History' of the First-edition Ulysses". Joyce Studies Annual. 9. University of Texas: 3–36.
- Bishop, Edward L., ed. (July 30, 1998). Virginia Woolf's Jacob's Room: The Holograph Draft. Pace University Press. ISBN 978-0-944473-45-0.
- Bishop, Ted (27 September 1999). Plastic is passe: credit is no longer a mark of distinction. Cash means class and escape from the matrix. Toronto, Ontario, Canada.
- Bishop, Edward (2002). "Institutions of Modernism: Literary Elites and Public Culture". Modern Philology. 99 (3): 485+. doi:10.1086/493109.
- Bishop, Edward, ed. (July 2004). Jacob's Room: The Shakespeare Head Press Edition of Virginia Woolf. Wiley-Blackwell. ISBN 978-0-631-17722-7.
- O'Driscoll, Michael; Bishop, Edward (2004). "Archiving 'archiving'". English Studies in Canada. 30 (1): 1+. doi:10.1353/esc.2004.0000. S2CID 201712013.
- Bishop, Edward (2005). Riding with Rilke: reflections on motorcycles and books. Viking Canada. ISBN 0-670-06385-1.
- Bishop, Ted (July 2006). "It's not the hardware, it's the history: the Harris Vincent Gallery (Excerpt adapted from Riding with Rilke)". International Journal of Motorcycle Studies.
- Bishop, Ted (2007). "Virginia Woolf, the Intellectual, and the Public Sphere". University of Toronto Quarterly. 76 (1). University of Toronto Press: 507–509. doi:10.1353/utq.2007.0018. S2CID 143117856.
