= Norman Ward =

Canadian writer and academic

Norman Ward OC FRSC
- Born: May 10, 1918; Hamilton, Ontario, Canada
- Died: February 6, 1990 (aged 71); Saskatoon, Saskatchewan, Canada
- Occupations: Humorist, academic
- Writing career
- Period: 1930s-1980s
- Notable works: Mice in the Beer, The Government of Canada

Norman McQueen Ward OC FRSC (May 19, 1918 – February 6, 1990) was a Canadian writer and academic. A longtime professor of political science at the University of Saskatchewan, his writings spanned a wide variety of genres from politics to biography to humor.

Born and raised in Hamilton, Ontario, he was educated at McMaster University and the University of Toronto. He joined the faculty of the University of Saskatchewan in 1944, staying with the institution until his retirement in 1985.

The writer and editor of several important political science texts on politics in Canada and Saskatchewan, he also published three books of humor. He won the Stephen Leacock Award in 1961 for Mice in the Beer, his first collection of humorous essays. His later humor works were The Fully-Processed Cheese (1964) and Her Majesty's Mice (1977).

He was named a Fellow of the Royal Society of Canada in 1962, and an Officer of the Order of Canada in 1976.

He also served on the advisory board for the first edition of The Canadian Encyclopedia in 1985.

He died in 1990 in Saskatoon. Jimmy Gardiner: Relentless Liberal, his biography of former Saskatchewan Premier James Garfield Gardiner, was published posthumously later that year.

== Works ==
- The Government of Canada (multiple editions 1947–1970, coedited with Robert MacGregor Dawson)
- The Canadian House of Commons: Representation (1950)
- Mice in the Beer (1960)
- The Public Purse: A Study in Canadian Democracy (1962)
- The Fully-Processed Cheese (1964)
- Politics in Saskatchewan (1968)
- Bilingualism and Biculturalism in the Canadian House of Commons (1968)
- Her Majesty's Mice (1977)
- Jimmy Gardiner: Relentless Liberal (1990)
