= Marq de Villiers =

South African-Canadian writer and journalist

Marq de Villiers CM (born 1940), is a South African-Canadian writer and journalist. He now chiefly writes non-fiction books on scientific topics. In the past he also worked as a magazine editor and foreign correspondent.

== Biography ==
Marq de Villiers was born in 1940 in Bloemfontein, South Africa. In 1989 he became the first recipient of the prestigious Alan Paton Award for White Tribe Dreaming. He and his wife, the writer Sheila Hirtle, live in Middle LaHave, Nova Scotia. They often collaborate on books.

Marq de Villiers was editor of Toronto Life magazine from 1981 to 1992 and subsequently publisher.

In 2010, he was made a Member of the Order of Canada. In 2011 his book, Our Way Out was published, dealing with the problems surrounding climate change, and possible solutions.

== Bibliography ==
Book	Award
Marq de Villiers (1989). White Tribe Dreaming: Apartheid's Bitter Roots: Notes of an eighth-generation Afrikaner. Penguin. pp. 420. ISBN 0-67081-794-5. OCLC 16754886.	Alan Paton Award
Marq de Villiers (1993). The Heartbreak Grape: A Search for the Perfect Pinot Noir. HarperCollins. ISBN 0-06258-523-1. OCLC 28376089.	
Marq de Villiers (1991). Down the Volga in a Time of Troubles: A Journey Through Post-Perestroika Russia. HarperCollins. ISBN 0-67084-353-9. OCLC 26264690.	
Garth Drabinsky (1992). Closer to the Sun (An Autobiography). with Marq de Villiers. Toronto: McClelland & Stewart. pp. 512. ISBN 0-77105650-8. OCLC 31781016.	
Marq de Villiers; Sheila Hirtle (1996). Blood Traitors: A True Saga of the American Revolution. HarperCollins. ISBN 0-00255424-0. OCLC 35939333.	
Marq de Villiers; Sheila Hirtle (1997). Into Africa: A Journey Through the Ancient Empires. Key Porter. ISBN 1-55013-884-7. OCLC 37369547.	
Marq de Villiers (1999). Water: The Fate of Our Most Precious Resource. McClelland & Stewart. ISBN 0-77102641-2. OCLC 43365804., revised 2003	Governor General's Award (1999)
Marq de Villiers (2001). America's Outdoors: Eastern Canada. National Geographic Society. ISBN 0-79227753-8. OCLC 46975165.	
Marq de Villiers; Sheila Hirtle (2003). Sahara: The Life of the Great Desert. McClelland & Stewart, and Walker and Co. ISBN 0-7710-2639-0.	
Marq de Villiers; Sheila Hirtle (2004). A Dune Adrift: The Strange Origins and Curious History of Sable Island. McClelland & Stewart. ISBN 0-7710-2642-0.	Evelyn Richardson Prize for Non-fiction
Marq de Villiers (2006). Windswept: The Story of Wind and Weather. McClelland & Stewart. ISBN 0-7710-2644-7. OCLC 62535616.	
Marq de Villiers (2007). Witch in the Wind: The True Story of the Legendary Bluenose. Thomas Allen and Co. ISBN 978-0-88762-224-3. OCLC 76870763.	Evelyn Richardson Prize for Non-fiction, Dartmouth Book Award for Non-fiction
Marq de Villiers (2007). Timbuktu: The Sahara's Fabled City of Gold. McClelland & Stewart. ISBN 978-0-7710-2646-1. OCLC 84989578.	
Marq de Villiers (2008). Dangerous World. Penguin. ISBN 978-0-67006568-4. OCLC 185022675.: US edition: Marq de Villiers (2008). The end : natural disasters, manmade catastrophes, and the future of human survival. Thomas Dunne-St. Martin's Press. ISBN 978-0-31236569-1. OCLC 223885730.	
Marq de Villiers (2011). Our Way Out: First Principles for a Post-Apocalyptic World. McClelland and Stewart. ISBN 978-0-7710-2648-5. OCLC 565924393.	
Back to the Well: Rethinking the Future of Water Goose Lane Editions ISBN 978-1773100463	
Hell and Damnation: A Sinner’s Guide to Eternal Torment March 2019 University of Regina Press ISBN 978-0889775848	
The Longbow, the Schooner, and the Violin: Wood and Human Achievement Sutherland House Books ISBN 978-1989555590	
