= Ross King (author) =

Canadian novelist and non-fiction writer (born 1962)

- Born: July 16, 1962 (age 64); Estevan, Saskatchewan, Canada
- Occupations: Writer, critic, historian
- Writing career
- Genres: Historical fiction, historical non-fiction
- Notable work: Domino

Ross King (born July 16, 1962) is a Canadian novelist and non-fiction writer. He began his career by writing two works of historical fiction in the 1990s, later turning to non-fiction, and has since written several critically acclaimed and best-selling historical works.

== Career and works ==
King was born in Estevan, Saskatchewan, Canada and was raised in the nearby village of North Portal. He received his undergraduate university education at the University of Regina, where in 1984 he completed a Bachelor of Arts (Honours) degree in English Literature. Continuing his studies at the University of Regina, he received a Master of Arts degree in 1986 upon completing a thesis on the poet T. S. Eliot. Later he achieved a PhD from York University in Toronto (1992), where he specialized in eighteenth-century English literature.

King moved to England to take up a position as a post-doctoral research fellow at University College London. It was at this time that he began writing his first novel.

King's first novel, Domino, (1995), tells the story of a castrato singer seen through the experience of an aspiring painter in the London of the 1770s.

In 1998, King published Ex-Libris, his second work of historical fiction. Set in London and Prague, it chronicles how a London bookseller's search in the 1660s for a missing manuscript leads him unwittingly into a world of deception and murder.

Brunelleschi's Dome: The Story of the Great Cathedral in Florence (2000) describes how the Italian architect Filippo Brunelleschi designed what still stands as the largest masonry dome ever built: the dome of the cathedral of Santa Maria del Fiore, completed in 1436. Brunelleschi's Dome marked King's transition from novelist to writer of art histories and biographies. Brunelleschi's Dome was on the bestseller lists of the New York Times, the Boston Globe and the San Francisco Chronicle, and was the recipient of several awards including the 2000 Book Sense Nonfiction Book of the Year.

Michelangelo and the Pope's Ceiling, (2002), follows the four arduous years during which Michelangelo painted the ceiling of the Sistine Chapel amid the political and religious intrigues of early sixteenth-century Rome. For Michelangelo and the Pope's Ceiling, King was nominated in 2003 for a National Book Critics Circle Award.

King's next book, The Judgment of Paris: The Revolutionary Decade That Gave the World Impressionism (2006), was met by much critical acclaim and considerable commercial success. By contrasting the works and lives of the French painters Ernest Meissonier and Édouard Manet, the book chronicles the dramatic transition by which the Impressionist painters changed the artistic vision of the late nineteenth- and early twentieth-century. King received Canada's 2006 Governor-General's Award for Non-Fiction for this book.

His next project, part of the Eminent Lives series, was Machiavelli: Philosopher of Power (2007), a biography of Niccolò Machiavelli in which King illustrates the personal, social and political development of one of history's most famous political theorists.

Defiant Spirits: The Modernist Revolution of the Group of Seven (2010) looked at the Group of Seven organization of Canadian landscape artists that launched Canada's first nationalist art movement in the decades after the First World War.

He was awarded Canada's 2012 Governor General's Award for English-language non-fiction for Leonardo and the Last Supper, his examination of da Vinci's iconic 15th century religious mural. In 2017, he won the RBC Taylor Prize for his book Mad Enchantment: Claude Monet and the Painting of the Water Lilies.

In 2021, King published The Bookseller of Florence, a nonfiction book about Vespasiano da Bisticci.

== Personal life ==
He lectures frequently in both Europe and North America, and has given guided tours of Florence Cathedral and of the Sistine Chapel in Rome.

King lives in Woodstock, England with his wife Melanie.

== Awards ==
- 2000: Nonfiction Book of the Year citation, Book Sense, for Brunelleschi's Dome: How a Renaissance Genius Reinvented Architecture
- 2003: Governor-General's Literary Award (Canada) nomination for Michelangelo and the Pope's Ceiling
- 2003: National Book Critics Circle Award nomination for Michelangelo and the Pope's Ceiling
- 2006: Governor-General's Literary Award (Canada) for Non-Fiction for The Judgment of Paris: The Revolutionary Decade that Gave the World Impressionism
- 2012: Governor General's Award for English-language non-fiction for Leonardo and the Last Supper
- 2017: RBC Taylor Prize for Mad Enchantment: Claude Monet and the Painting of the Water Lilies

== Bibliography ==
- Domino (1995)
- Ex-Libris (1998)
- Brunelleschi's Dome: The Story of the Great Cathedral in Florence (2000)
- Michelangelo and the Pope's Ceiling (2002)
- The Judgment of Paris: The Revolutionary Decade That Gave the World Impressionism (2006)
- Machiavelli: Philosopher of Power (2007)
- Defiant Spirits: The Modernist Revolution of the Group of Seven (2010)
- Leonardo and the Last Supper (2011)
- Mad Enchantment: Claude Monet and the Painting of the Water Lilies (2016)
- The Bookseller of Florence: The Story of the Manuscripts That Illuminated the Renaissance (2021)
- The Shortest History of Italy (2024)
- The Shortest History of Ancient Rome (2025)
