= Leonardo and the Last Supper =

2011 book written by Ross King

- First edition
- Author: Ross King
- Language: English
- Genre: History
- Publisher: Bloomsbury Publishing
- Publication date: 2011
- Publication place: United States
- Media type: Print (hardcover and paperback)

Leonardo and the Last Supper, is a 2011 book written by Ross King, a Canadian novelist and non-fiction writer. He was awarded Canada's 2012 Governor General's Award for English-language non-fiction for Leonardo and the Last Supper, his examination of da Vinci's iconic 15th century religious mural.

== Overview ==
Leonardo da Vinci's painting of The Last Supper in the former refectory of Santa Maria delle Grazie in Milan took him and his team of assistants about three years to complete. The painting was not painted using traditional fresco technique but used an experimental oil-based medium. This proved to be a disaster as on a wall prone to damp, the paint surface quickly deteriorated. For centuries the painting was subjected to invasive restorations and retouchings.

== Critical response ==
In a positive review for The Guardian, Charles Nicholl wrote; "King has the gift of clear, unpretentious exposition, and an instinctive narrative flair." Michiko Kakutani, writing for The New York Times called the book a "gripping account" and wrote that, although there is not much new research, King does a "fluent and insightful job of weaving together all his research."
