= 1967 Governor General's Awards =

Canadian literary award

Each winner of the 1967 Governor General's Awards for Literary Merit was selected by a panel of judges administered by the Canada Council for the Arts. The winners were awarded a cash prize of $2500.

== Winners ==
=== English Language ===
- Poetry or Drama: Alden Nowlan, Bread, Wine and Salt.
- Poetry or Drama: Eli Mandel, An Idiot Joy.
- Non-Fiction: Norah Story, The Oxford Companion to Canadian History and Literature.

=== French Language ===
- Fiction: Jacques Godbout, Salut Galarneau.
- Poetry or Drama: Françoise Loranger, Encore Cinq Minutes.
- Non-Fiction: Robert-Lionel Séguin, La civilisation traditionelle de l'"Habitant" aux XVII^e et XVIII^e siècles.
