= Josephine Phelan =

Canadian writer and librarian

Josephine Phelan (1905–1979), Canadian writer and librarian, won the Governor General's Award for English-language non-fiction in 1951 for The Ardent Exile, a biography of Thomas D'Arcy McGee.

Born in Hamilton, Phelan was educated in Guelph and at the University of Toronto where she earned a Master of History. After attending the Ontario College of Education, Phelan taught high school before moving to Montreal to work in publishing. In 1931, she returned to the University of Toronto and earned a degree in library science in 1931 and worked at the Toronto Public Library from 1932 to 1965.

== Works ==
- The Ardent Exile: The Life and Times of Thos. Darcy McGee (1951)
- The Boy Who Ran Away: Great Stories of Canada (1954)
- The Bold Heart: The Story of Father Lacombe (1956)
- The Ballad of D'Arcy McGee: Rebel in Exile (1967)
