= Marion MacRae =

Canadian architectural historian (1921 –2008)

Marion MacRae (April 30, 1921 – August 11, 2008) was a Canadian architectural historian who won the Governor General's Award for English-language non-fiction in 1975 for Hallowed Walls.

Born in Apple Hill, Ontario, in 1921, to John David MacRae and Hazel Carlyle MacRae, Marion Bell MacRae grew up in Eastern Ontario and entered at the Ontario College of Art in 1947. She undertook doctoral work at the University of Illinois between 1951 and 1954. She taught Museum Research and Design History for many years at the Ontario College of Art and spent several summers studying the architecture of the seven Loyalist villages submerged by the building of the Saint Lawrence Seaway. She also taught the History of Canadian Architecture at the University of Toronto.

MacRae wrote several books with Anthony Adamson, including Hallowed Walls, an examination of the architecture of early Ontario churches. In addition to the Governor's General Award, MacRae was also awarded the Order of Canada in 1982.

== Works ==
- The Ancestral Roof: The Domestic Architecture of Upper Canada (1963)
- Hallowed Walls: Church Architecture of Upper Canada (1975)
- MacNab of Dundurn (1971)
- Cornerstones of Order: Courthouses and Townhalls of Ontario, 1784–1914 (1983)
