= James Eayrs =

Canadian historian (1926–2021)

James Eayrs OC, FRSC
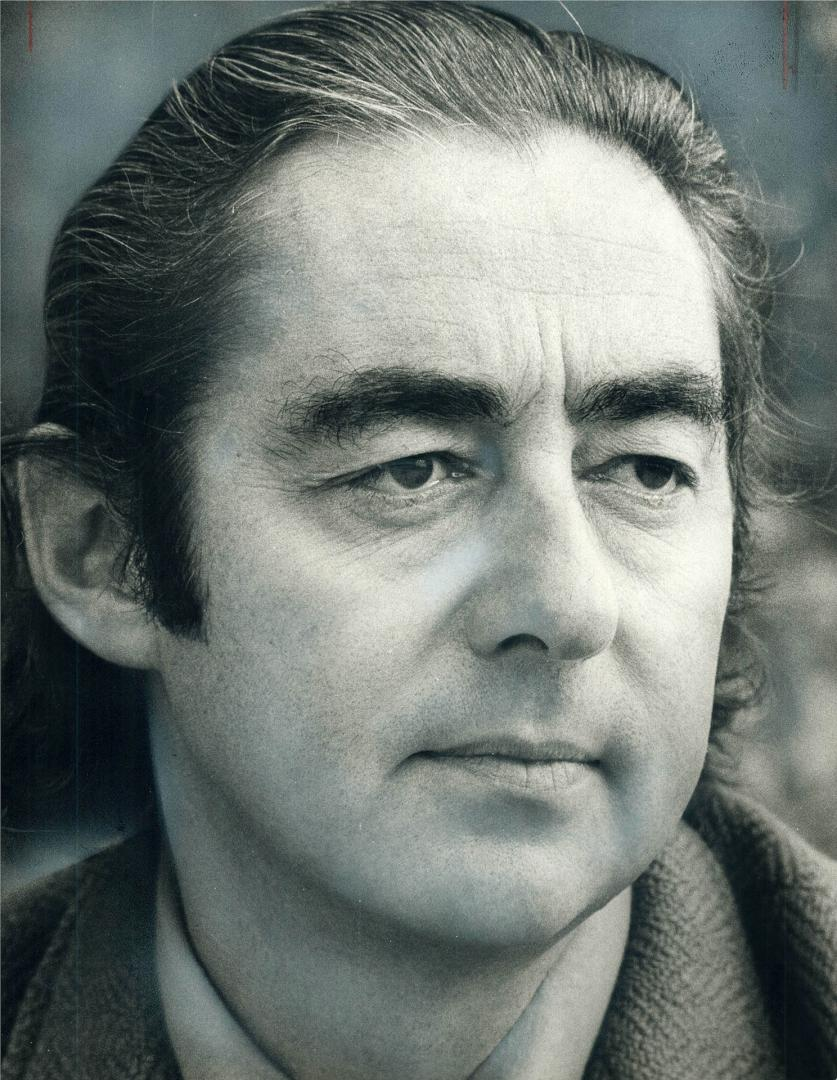
- Eayrs in 1972
- Born: James George Eayrs; October 13, 1926; London, England
- Died: February 6, 2021 (aged 94); Toronto, Ontario, Canada
- Spouse: Elizabeth Eayrs

Academic background
- Education: University of Toronto; Columbia University; London School of Economics

Academic work
- Discipline: Political science
- Institutions: University of Toronto; Dalhousie University

James George Eayrs, OC, FRSC (13 October 1926 – 6 February 2021) was a Canadian political scientist and journalist.

== Biography ==
Eayrs won the Governor General's Award for English-language non-fiction at the 1965 Governor General's Awards for his book In Defence of Canada: From the Great War to the Great Depression. The book, which examined Canadian military and defence policy during the period between the First World War and the Great Depression, was the first in a multi-volume series on Canadian military history and was followed by In Defence of Canada, Vol. 2: Appeasement and Rearmament (1965), In Defence of Canada: Peacemaking and Deterrence (1972), In Defence of Canada: Growing Up Allied (1980) and In Defence of Canada: Indochina, Roots of Complicity (1983).

A professor of political economy at the University of Toronto and later of political science at Dalhousie University, he was awarded the Canada Council Molson Prize in 1984 and was named a fellow of the Royal Society of Canada. In 1985, he was appointed to the Order of Canada.

Eayrs was also active as a journalist, writing a weekly public affairs column for the Montreal Star and later the Toronto Star. As a broadcaster, he wrote for the CTV series Here Come the Seventies and then cohosted with Charlotte Gobeil the CBC television program, Weekend.

His wife, Elizabeth Eayrs, sat on Toronto City Council from 1972 to 1978.

Awards
| Preceded by Phyllis Grosskurth | Governor General's Award for English-language non-fiction 1965 | Succeeded by George Woodcock |
| Preceded by Francess Halpenny | Molson Prize; 1984; With: Marcel Dubé | Succeeded by Ronald Melzack |
| Preceded by Brian Macdonald | Molson Prize; 1984; With: Marcel Dubé | Succeeded by Gaston Miron |
