= A History of Marriage =

Non-fiction book by Elizabeth Abbott

- Book cover, first edition
- Author: Elizabeth Abbott
- Language: English
- Publisher: Penguin Canada
- Publication date: 29 December 2009
- ISBN: 978-0143017141

A History of Marriage, published by Penguin Canada in 2009, is a non-fiction book by Elizabeth Abbott, the Canadian author of A History of Celibacy (1999) and A History of Mistresses (2003) that combines general history and personal histories of marriage. The book is a study of mostly North American rituals of courting, nuptials, marriage, sex, child-raising and divorce. Some topics covered are relative ages at which various societies from Chinese to Mormon married off their girls; details of the satisfying marriage of Martin Luther and former nun Katharina von Bora; the ruptured family units of Native American children removed to residential schools; the popularity of so-called Boston marriages (depicted by Henry James in The Bostonians) between like-minded women who resisted conventional marriage but weren't necessarily lesbian; and the scarcity of sponges used for contraception by Northern women during the Civil War because of the cut-off in supply from Florida. A History of Marriage was a finalist for the 2010 Governor General's Literary Award for non-fiction.
