= 1944 Governor General's Awards =

Canadian literary award

The 1944 Governor General's Awards for Literary Merit were the ninth rendition of the Governor General's Awards, Canada's annual national awards program which then comprised literary awards alone. The awards recognized Canadian writers for new English-language works published in Canada during 1944 and were presented in 1945. There were no cash prizes.

As every year from 1942 to 1948, there two awards for non-fiction, and four awards in the three established categories, which recognized English-language works only.

== Winners ==
- Fiction: Gwethalyn Graham, Earth and High Heaven
- Poetry or drama: Dorothy Livesay, Day and Night
- Non-fiction: Dorothy Duncan, Partner in Three Worlds
- Non-fiction: Edgar McInnis, The War: Fourth Year
