= Sid Marty =

Canadian writer (born 1944)

Sid Marty (born 1944) is a Canadian writer. Marty has written five non-fiction books and five poetry books, and also is a singer. Many of his books reflect the time he spent as a park warden for Parks Canada between 1966 and 1978 in Yoho, Jasper, Prince Albert and Banff national parks. Marty grew up in Medicine Hat and Calgary, and now lives in Pincher Creek. He received an undergraduate degree from Sir George Williams University. His three poetry collections are Headwaters, Nobody Danced with Miss Rodeo and Sky Humour; The Black Grizzly of Whiskey Creek won the Grand Prize of the Banff Mountain Book Festival in 2008.

== Works ==
- 1973: Headwaters (poetry), Toronto: McClelland and Stewart. ISBN 978-0771058141
- 1978: Men for the Mountains, Toronto: McClelland and Stewart, 320 pages. ISBN 978-0771056727
- 1981: Nobody Danced With Miss Rodeo (poetry), Toronto: McClelland and Stewart, 108 pages. ISBN 978-0771058615
- 1985: A Grand and Fabulous Notion: The first century of Canada's parks, Toronto: NC Press, 156 pages. ISBN 978-0920053072
- 1995: Leaning on the Wind: Under the spell of the great Chinook, Toronto: Harper-Collins, 352 pages. ISBN 978-1894974622
- 1999: Sky Humour (poetry), Windsor: Black Moss, 102 pages. ISBN 978-0887533310
- 1999: Switchbacks: true stories of the Canadian Rockies, Toronto: McClelland and Stewart, 336 pages. ISBN 978-0771056703
- 2008: The Black Grizzly of Whiskey Creek, Toronto: McClelland and Stewart, 296 pages. ISBN 978-0771056987
