= Dragan Todorović (writer) =

Writer and multimedia artist

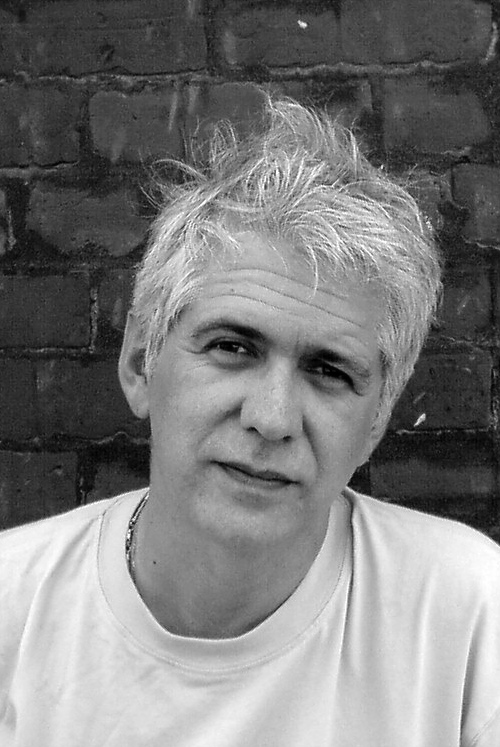
Todorović

Dragan Todorović (Serbian Cyrillic: Драган Тодоровић; born September 1958 in Kragujevac, PR Serbia, FPR Yugoslavia) is a writer and multimedia artist. Until 1995 he lived in Yugoslavia, where he worked as a journalist, editor, and television personality.

== Career ==
Between 1977 and 1995 Todorović published over 2,000 articles (commentaries, interviews, essays and reports) in leading Yugoslav magazines. On radio, he worked as a host, writer and producer, among other things writing and directing 24 radio-plays for Radio Politika. He also made two TV documentaries and hosted over 150 TV shows.

He won the Best Young Journalist award in 1980. He published four books in Yugoslavia: Tajfun zvani Bruce (Hurricane Called Bruce, 1989—biography of Bruce Springsteen), Džokej pun burbona (Jockey Full of Bourbon, 1990—Tom Waits' poetry - translation and introduction), Pogled kroz prozor metroa (View Through the Window of a Subway, 1991—biography of Tom Waits), and Sen & san (A Shadow and a Dream, 1993—conceptual book of poetry).

His series of essays on rock, titled Pesme uz koje ne igram (The Songs I don't Dance to), published in Politika's Rock Magazine, had a cult status in the country. An extended version of the series was published in 2009 as Pjesme uz koje ne plešem.

He had two solo exhibitions in Belgrade and directed two theatre shows. He is in the Serbian edition of Who's Who.

Todorović continued to write after moving to Canada during the early 1990s. He published in the Toronto Star, This Magazine, Saturday Night, NOW, Ottawa Citizen and other Canadian publications. In 1997 his article Border Crossing was nominated for the Canadian National Magazine Award. In 1998 he was part of the prestigious Creative Journalism program at Banff Centre for the Arts. His essay Ticket to Fiction was published in 2000 as part of the collection To Arrive Where You Are. The same year, he worked with Ken Finkleman as the script consultant on Finkleman's TV series Foreign Objects, where he also played a leading role in one of the episodes.

For his multimedia work, Todorović won awards at the New York Festivals, John Caples International Awards, and Astound International Competition (for his interactive poetry site, Six Walks on Isabella Street). His most recent project was a sound-art piece for CBC Radio One, titled In My Language I am Smart.

In September 2005 Todorović moved to England. His memoir, titled The Book of Revenge, was published in March 2006 by Random House. It was awarded the Nereus Writers' Trust Non-Fiction Prize, and nominated for British Columbia's National Award for Canadian Non-Fiction. In March 2009 Random House Canada published his novel Diary of Interrupted Days to critical acclaim. It was short listed for Commonwealth Writers' Prize, for the Amazon.ca/Quill & Quire First Novel Award, and for the Toronto Book Awards.

Todorovic teaches Creative Writing at the University of Warwick in Coventry.

== Works ==
=== Books ===
- Todorović, Dragan (1989). Tajfun zvani Bruce [Hurricane Called Bruce]. Belgrade: Edicija Posebna Izdanja. ISBN 86-7129-002-6.
- Waits, Tom (1990). Džokej pun burbona [Jockey Full of Bourbon]. Trans. Dragan Todorović. Niš: Gradina. ISBN 86-7129-002-6.
- Todorović, Dragan (1991). Pogled kroz prozor metroa [View Through the Window of a Subway Car]. Belgrade: Taš Print.
- Todorović, Dragan (1993). Sen i san [A shadow and a Dream]. Belgrade: conceptual book, single copy. p. 64.
- Todorović, Dragan (2006). The Book of Revenge. Toronto: Random House Canada. ISBN 0-679-31396-6.
- Todorović, Dragan (2009). Diary of Interrupted Days. Toronto: Random House Canada. ISBN 978-0-307-35688-8.
- Todorović, Dragan (2009). Pjesme uz koje ne plešem [The Songs I Don't Dance to]. Rijeka: Naklada Uliks. ISBN 978-953-7306-37-3.
- Todorović, Dragan (2012). Little red transistor radio from Trieste. Rugby: Nine Arches Press. ISBN 978-0957098497.

=== Essays ===
- Dragan Todorovic (2000). "Ticket to Fiction: Art & War in Belgrade". In Obe, Don; Echlin, Kim; Moon, Barbara (eds.). To arrive where you are: literary journalism from the Banff Centre for the Arts. Banff: Banff Centre Press. ISBN 0-920159-71-0.
