= Edmund Metatawabin =

First Nations chief and writer

Edmund Metatawabin CM
- Born: 1948 (age 77–78); Fort Albany, Ontario
- Occupations: Chief, author, Indigenous advocate.
- Writing career
- Period: 1980s–present
- Notable work: Up Ghost River: A Chief’s Journey Through the Turbulent Waters of Native History

Edmund Metatawabin CM is a First Nations chief and writer, whose 2014 memoir Up Ghost River: A Chief's Journey Through the Turbulent Waters of Native History was a shortlisted nominee for the Governor General's Award for English-language non-fiction at the 2014 Governor General's Awards.

A former chief of the Fort Albany First Nation in Ontario, he published Up Ghost River, cowritten with journalist Alexandra Shimo, as a memoir of his childhood experience in Canada's Indian residential schools system.
