= Alexandra Shimo =

Canadian writer

- Occupations: journalist, writer
- Website: www.alexandrashimo.com

Alexandra Shimo is a Canadian writer.

== Early life and education ==
Born in Toronto, Canada, Shimo grew up in London, United Kingdom. She graduated Oxford University with an BA in Philosophy, politics and economics followed by a Masters from Columbia University in journalism.

== Writing career ==
In 2016, Shimo published Invisible North: The Search for Answers on a Troubled Reserve. Based on first person reportage of the four months Shimo lived in Kashechewan First Nation in northern Ontario, the book describes how inhuman conditions had decimated the local community and the legal, economic and political circumstances that trap many northern indigenous communities in poverty. The book was longlisted for the RBC Taylor Prize, and a finalist for the BC Award for Canadian Non-Fiction. It was one of the Globe and Mail's best books of the year.

Shimo was a shortlisted nominee for the Governor General's Award for English-language non-fiction at the 2014 Governor General's Awards as cowriter of Edmund Metatawabin's memoir Up Ghost River: A Chief's Journey Through the Turbulent Waters of Native History. The book describes Metatawabin's life during and after St. Anne's, a residential school in Fort Albany, northern Ontario. The book became a national bestseller and was named one of the best books of 2014 by the Canadian Broadcasting Corporation, The Hill Times and Quill and Quire. In February 2015, it was named one of the winners of the CBC's Bookie Awards.

A former editor at Maclean's, Shimo is a freelance journalist who has contributed to The Guardian, the Toronto Star, the Canadian Broadcasting Corporation, Maclean's, the National Post, The Globe and Mail and Toronto Life, she is also the author of The Environment Equation: 100 Factors That Can Add to or Subtract From Your Total Carbon Footprint.

== Teaching ==
She teaches creative nonfiction part-time at University of Toronto Continuing Studies.

== Awards ==
- Finalist 2017 – BC Achievement Award for Non Fiction
- Winner 2016 - Speaker's Book Award
- Winner 2015 – CBC Books Bookie Award for Non-Fiction
- Winner 2015 – Ontario Historical Society's Donald Grant Creighton Award
- Finalist 2014 – Governor General's Literary Award for Non-Fiction
- Finalist 2015–2016 – Trillium Book Award
- Finalist 2015–2016 – First Nation Communities Read

== Works ==
- The Environment Equation: 100 Factors That Can Add to or Subtract From Your Total Carbon Footprint (2008)
- Up Ghost River: A Chief's Journey Through the Turbulent Waters of Native History (2014)
- Invisible North: The Search for Answers on a Troubled Reserve (2016)
