= Elizabeth Abbott =

Canadian writer, historian and animal rights activist

- Born: 1942 (age 83–84); Montreal, Canada
- Education: Sir George Williams University (BA); McGill University (MA, PhD)
- Occupations: Writer, historian
- Children: 1

Elizabeth Louise Abbott (born 1946) is a Canadian writer, historian and animal rights activist. She is the former dean of women for St. Hilda's College at the University of Toronto and is currently a senior research associate at Trinity College, University of Toronto.

Abbott has written numerous books, and has contributed to many publications, including The Globe and Mail, Toronto Star, Ottawa Citizen, The Gazette (Montreal), Quill & Quire, Huffington Post and London Free Press.

Abbott ran to represent the riding of Toronto—Danforth in the House of Commons of Canada at the 2015 and 2019 Canadian federal elections as a member of the Animal Protection Party of Canada.

== Personal life and education ==
Abbott was born in 1946 in Ottawa, Ontario to William Richard and Margaret Langley Abbott. In 1963, she received a Bachelor of Arts from Sir George Williams University, then attended McGill University, where she received a Master of Arts in 1966 and Doctor of Philosophy in history in 1971.

Abbott has a son, Ivan.

== Selected texts ==
=== A History of Mistresses ===
A History of Mistresses examines the large, and often underground history of mistresses. Ranging from Roman Europe to Twentieth Century America, Abbott explores the lives of the 'scarlet women' and the implications of their extramarital relationships.

=== A History of Marriage ===
A History of Marriage, the third book in Abbot's trilogy on the history of relationships. examines various rituals of courting, nuptials, marriage, sex, child-raising and divorce. The book was a finalist for the 2010 Governor General's Literary Award in the category of English non-fiction.

Seven Stories Press reprinted A History of Marriage in paperback in August 2015.

=== Haiti: A Shattered Nation ===
Haiti: A Shattered Nation is an update of her 1988 book, Haiti: The Duvaliers and their Legacy, commissioned after the 2010 Haiti earthquake, for which she added a new introduction and two new chapters.

== Publications ==
- Tropical Obsession: A Universal Tragedy in Four Acts Set in Haiti, 1986
- Haiti: The Duvaliers and their Legacy, 1988
- A History of Celibacy, 1999
- A History of Mistresses, 2003
- Sugar: A Bittersweet History, 2008
- A History of Marriage, 2010
- Haiti: A Shattered Nation, 2011
