= Michelangelo and the Pope's Ceiling =

2002 book written by Ross King

- Author: Ross King
- Language: English
- Genre: History
- Publisher: Bloomsbury Publishing
- Publication date: 2002
- Publication place: United States
- Media type: Print (hardcover and paperback)

Michelangelo and the Pope's Ceiling is a 2002 book written by Ross King, a Canadian novelist and non-fiction writer. It garnered nominations in 2003 for the Governor-General's Literary Award (Canada) and the National Book Critics Circle Award.

== Overview ==
Pope Julius II commissioned Michelangelo Buonarroti to paint the ceiling of the newly restored Sistine Chapel in Rome. Michelangelo had little experience as a frescoist. Despite his initial reluctance and subsequent disagreements with Julius, Michelangelo perseveres. King addresses a number of myths generated over the years (many of which were propagated in the film drama The Agony and the Ecstasy) about the process and completion of the frescoes.

== Critical response ==
In a 2003 book review by Kirkus Reviews called the book "A legend-busting, richly detailed account of the four-year making of the Sistine Chapel frescos." Michael McNay, in his review for The Guardian, called the book, "a good read" and praised King's "feel for daily life and an enthusiasm for the basics", but rejects King's view as improbable that Pope Julius allowed Michelangelo authority over the iconology of the work." Boyd Tonkin, writing for The Independent, wrote; "King deftly stitches modern Michelangelo scholarship into his fluent and gripping narrative. The result is a delightful book that overturns many legends."
