= Karen Connelly =

Canadian writer

Karen Marie Connelly (born 12 March 1969) is a Canadian travel writer, novelist and poet who has written extensively about her experiences living in Greece, Thailand and Canada.

== Life and work ==
Connelly was born in Calgary, Alberta. At seventeen, she lived in a Thai village thanks to a Rotary exchange scholarship. She returned to Canada a year later. At nineteen, she left for Spain, where she lived almost two years. Having no work visa, she supported herself by, among other things, teaching English as a second language. In her spare time, she wrote about her experiences and took photographs with which to illustrate her writing. She also reworked the letters and journals, which she had written in Thailand, into a manuscript that was to become Touch the Dragon by Karen Connelly.

In 1991, she moved to France and settled in Montclar, Avignon, where she studied French and Spanish. Soon after, she travelled to Greece, spending most of her time on the island of Lesbos, to which she has occasionally returned. She then moved back to Canada for an extended period, writing and promoting her work.

Her first book, a poetry collection entitled The Small Words in My Body (1990), won the Pat Lowther Award for poetry in 1991. Her second book, Touch the Dragon: A Thai Journal (1992), won the Governor General's Award for English-language non-fiction.

Three poetry collections followed, This Brighter Prison (1993) The Disorder of Love (1997) and The Border Surrounds Us (2000). She also compiled a book of letters, One Room in a Castle, detailing her experiences in Europe.

In 1996, she returned to Thailand and also visited Myanmar (she prefers the older name, Burma). Her experiences there served as the basis for her novel about a political prisoner, The Lizard Cage, which won the Orange Award for New Writers and was longlisted for the 2007 International Dublin Literary Award.

Connelly remained in Thailand for two years before returning to Canada, where she married. She lives in Toronto.

== Bibliography ==
Karen Connelly talks about Burmese Lessons on Bookbits radio.

- The Small Words in My Body – 1990
- Touch the Dragon: A Thai Journal – 1992
- This Brighter Prison: A Book of Journeys – 1993
- One Room in a Castle – 1995
- The Disorder of Love – 1997
- The Border Surrounds Us – 2000
- Grace and Poison – 2001
- The Lizard Cage – 2005
- Burmese Lessons – 2010
- Come Cold River – 2013
- The Change Room – 2017

== Recognition / Literary Prizes ==
- Touch the Dragon, Governor General's Award
- The Small Words in My Body, Pat Lowther

== Critical reception ==
Globe and Mail Review, reviewer called The Lizard Cage, "one of the best Canadian novels".

Her most successful and widely published book is The Lizard Cage.

== See also ==
- List of Canadian poets
