= Carolyn Abraham =

Canadian freelance journalist and author

- Born: 1968 (age 57–58); London, England
- Education: Carleton University (BA)
- Occupations: Journalist, author and public speaker
- Spouse: Stephen Rouse
- Children: 2
- Parents: Dudley Abraham (father); Thelma Crooks (mother)
- Website: www.carolynabraham.ca

Carolyn Abraham is a British-born Canadian freelance journalist and author.

== Biography ==
She was born in 1968 in London, England, and moved to Canada in 1972 with her parents and three older siblings. She grew up in St. Catharines, Ontario. and Mississauga, Ontario.

Abraham graduated with a Bachelor of Arts degree in journalism from Carleton University in 1991, and worked for the Ottawa Citizen from 1991 to 1997. She later worked for The Globe and Mail as the senior medical reporter from February 1998 to January 2012. She won a National Newspaper Award in 2008 for her work on diagnosing bipolar disorder in children.

Her first book, Possessing Genius: The Bizarre Odyssey of Einstein's Brain was released in seven countries. It followed the travels of post-autopsy Albert Einstein's brain. It was nominated for the finalist for the Governor General's Award for English-language non-fiction at the 2002 Governor General's Awards.

Her second book, The Juggler's Children: A Journey into Family, Legend and the Genes that Bind Us was released by Random House of Canada on March 26, 2013. It details her use of DNA testing and document searches to learn about her ancestry.

== Filmography ==
=== Film ===
Year	Film	Role	Notes
2005	The Riddle of Einstein's Brain	Herself - Author	Documentary film

=== Television ===
Year	Title	Role	Notes
2006	The Agenda with Steve Paikin	Herself	Episode: "Carolyn Abraham / Health Care Reality Check"
2007	The Agenda with Steve Paikin	Herself	Episode: "Carolyn Abraham / The Right to Be Disabled"
2007	The Agenda with Steve Paikin	Herself	Episode: "Stem Cells: A Breakthrough"
2008	The Agenda with Steve Paikin	Herself	Episode: "Childhood Bipolar Disorder"
2009	The Agenda with Steve Paikin	Herself	Episode: "Whose DNA Is It?"
2013	The Agenda with Steve Paikin	Herself	Episode: "What's in Your Genes?"
2013	The Morning Show	Herself	
2013	The Agenda with Steve Paikin	Herself	Episode: "The Genes That Bind Us"

== Books ==
Release date	Author	Title	Publisher	Notes
January 1, 2004	Carolyn Abraham Gregory Stock	The Bizarre Odyssey of Einstein's Brain	Icon Books	Hardcover / Paperback
March 26, 2013	Carolyn Abraham	The Juggler's Children: A Journey into Family, Legend and the Genes that Bind Us	Random House of Canada	Hardcover / Paperback / Kindle Edition

== Awards and nominations ==
Awards
Year	Award	Category	Production	Result
2008	National Newspaper Awards		Rising Diagnoses of Bipolar Disorder in Children	Won
2018	National Newspaper Awards	Explanatory Writing	"Cracks in the code: Why mapping your DNA may be less reliable than you think,"	Won
2002	Governor General's Awards	Literary Award for Nonfiction	Possessing Genius: The Bizarre Odyssey of Einstein's Brain	Nominated
2013	Governor General's Awards	Literary Award for Nonfiction	The Juggler's Children: A Journey into Family, Legend and the Genes that Bind Us	Nominated
