= Iranian Journal of Medical Sciences =

- Discipline: Medicine
- Language: English
- Edited by: Younes Ghasemi

Publication details
- Former name(s): Pahlavi Medical Journal
- History: 1970-present
- Frequency: Bimonthly
- Open access: Yes

Standard abbreviations
- ISO 4: Iran. J. Med. Sci.

Indexing
- CODEN: IJMSDW
- ISSN: 0253-0716 (print); 1735-3688 (web)
- OCLC no.: 367625101
- Pahlavi Medical Journal
- ISSN: 0030-9427
- OCLC no.: 915047455

Links
- Journal homepage; Online access; Online archive

The Iranian Journal of Medical Sciences is a bimonthly medical journal established in 1970 as the Pahlavi Medical Journal, obtaining its current name in 1979. The editor-in-chief is Younes Ghasemi.

== Abstracting and indexing ==
The journal is indexed and abstracted in Embase/Excerpta Medica, Emerging Sources Citation Index, and Scopus.
