= Mark L. Winston =

Canadian biologist and writer

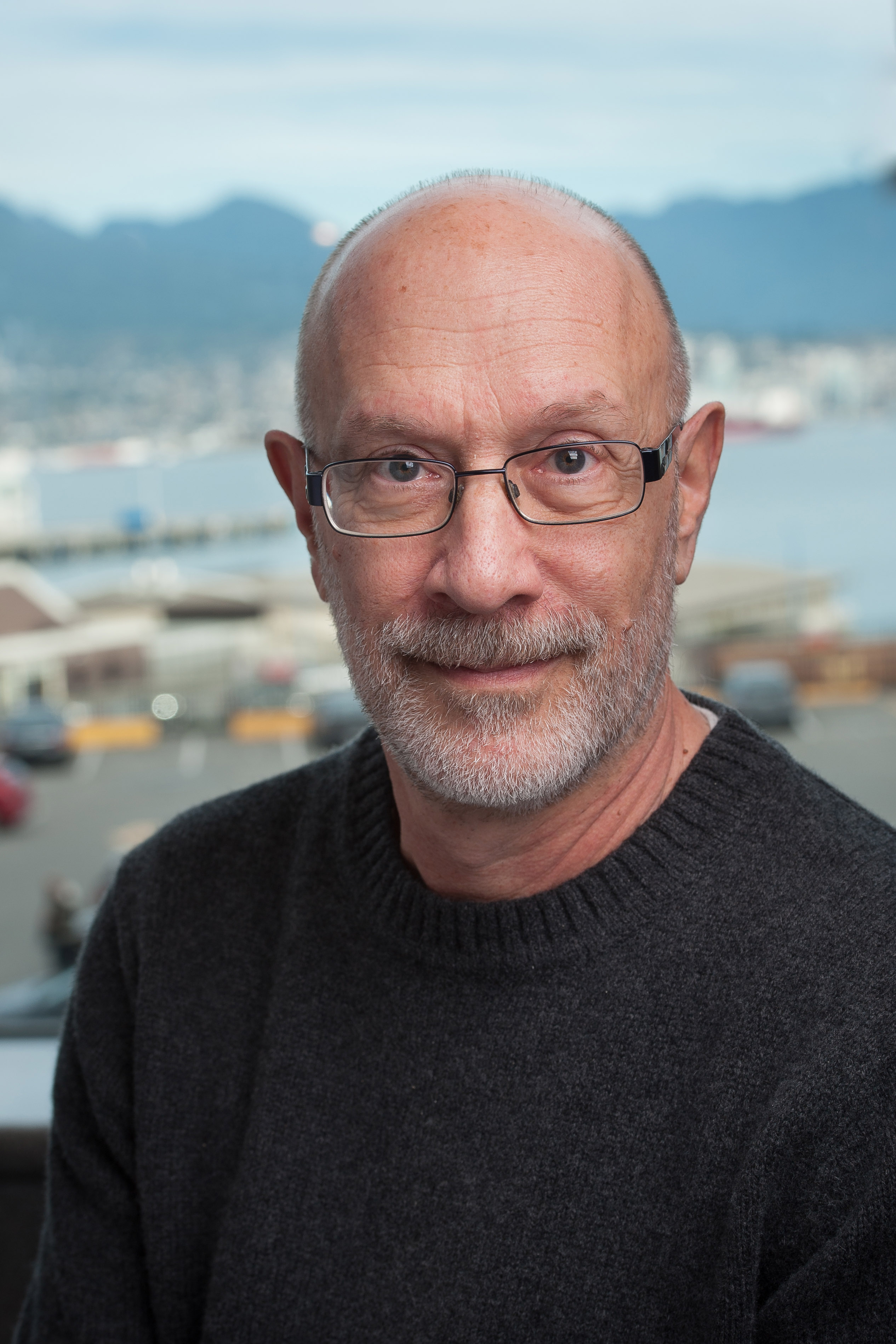
- Mark L. Winston, October 2015
- Occupations: academic, writer
- Writing career
- Genre: science
- Notable work: Bee Time: Lessons from the Hive
- Website: winstonhive.com

Mark L. Winston is a Canadian biologist and writer. A professor of apiculture and social insects at Simon Fraser University, he spent much of his career studying bees until becoming founding director of the university's Centre for Dialogue in 2006.

His 2014 book Bee Time: Lessons from the Hive won the Governor General's Award for English-language non-fiction and was shortlisted for the Science in Society General Book Award.

== Works ==
- The Biology of the Honey Bee (Harvard University Press, 1984)
- Killer Bees: The Africanized Honey Bee in the Americas (Harvard University Press, 1992)
- Nature Wars: People vs. Pests (Harvard University Press, 1997)
- Travels in the Genetically Modified Zone (Harvard University Press, 2002)
- Bee Time: Lessons from the Hive (Harvard University Press, 2014)
