= 1965 Governor General's Awards =

Canadian literary award

Each winner of the 1965 Governor General's Awards for Literary Merit was selected by a panel of judges administered by the Canada Council for the Arts.

== Winners ==
=== English Language ===
- Poetry or Drama: Al Purdy, The Cariboo Horses.
- Non-Fiction: James Eayrs, In Defence of Canada.

=== French Language ===
- Fiction: Gérard Bessette, L'incubation
- Poetry or Drama: Gilles Vigneault, Quand les bateaux s'en vont.
- Non-Fiction: André S. Vachon, Le temps et l'espace dans l'oeuvre de Paul Claudel.
