= Dark Age Ahead =

2004 book by Jane Jacobs

- First edition cover
- Author: Jane Jacobs
- Language: English
- Subject: Urban policy
- Genre: Non-fiction
- Publisher: Random House
- Publication date: May 5, 2004
- Publication place: United States
- Media type: Print, e-book
- Pages: 241 pp.
- ISBN: 1-4000-6232-2
- OCLC: 613767402

Dark Age Ahead is a 2004 book by Jane Jacobs describing what she sees as the decay of five key "pillars" in "North America": community and family, higher education, science and technology, taxes and government responsiveness to citizen's needs, and self-regulation by the learned professions.

She argues that this decay threatens to create a Dark Age unless the trends are reversed. Jacobs characterizes a Dark Age as a "mass amnesia" where even the memory of what was lost is lost.

== Jacobs' arguments ==
The following is a summary of Jacobs' description of the decay in each area.

Community and Family
People are increasingly choosing consumerism over family welfare, that is: consumption over fertility; debt over family budget discipline; fiscal advantage to oneself at the expense of community welfare.
Higher Education
Universities are more interested in credentials than providing high quality education.
Bad Science
Elevation of economics as the main "science" to consider in making major political decisions.
Bad Government
Governments are more interested in deep-pocket interest groups than the welfare of the population.
Bad Culture
A culture that prevents people from understanding the deterioration of fundamental physical resources on which the entire community depends.

== Jacobs' stance against ideology ==
Overall, Jacobs argued that the very concept of "ideology" is fundamentally flawed and detrimental to both individuals and societies, no matter what side of the political spectrum an ideology comes from. By relying on ideals, she claimed people become unable to think and evaluate problems and solutions by themselves, but simply fall back on their beliefs for "pre-fabricated answers" to any problem they encounter.

=== Example ===
As an example, which also tied into Jacobs' views on city community life, she cited the 1995 Chicago heat wave, which killed hundreds of mostly elderly Chicagoans.

The "official" reason, according to the United States Department of Health (following a multi-million dollar study), was that the victims simply did not take precautions such as maintaining a steady water supply, finding air conditioning, or circulating air in their buildings. Jacobs argued that the study, in addition to spending millions of dollars to state the obvious, was flawed because of its inherent ideology, which was individualism. She noted that a sociology graduate student, Eric Klinenberg, wrote his thesis on the disaster, Heat Wave: A Social Autopsy of Disaster in Chicago, which proved much more enlightening.

By examining the social atmosphere of different Chicago neighborhoods, Klinenberg discovered that many deaths were not dependent on individual factors, such as wealth, but rather on the cohesiveness of the neighborhood. Within tightly-knit and older neighborhoods, he found, elderly people at risk of heat stroke were more likely to be checked on by neighbors, less afraid to leave their homes to get help, and more likely to find sympathetic people and businesses that would allow them to relax in an air-conditioned environment (for example, dropping into a neighborhood grocery or barbershop, and having a proprietor willing to simply let them sit). In contrast, death rates were higher within neighborhoods where the elderly were isolated and unable to get help. Ironically, wealthier neighborhoods were less likely to have strong neighborly ties.

Jacobs, citing the two studies, argued that the federal study was unconsciously biased by the prevailing political and economic ideology (that is, neoliberalism), which promoted individualism to the point of becoming completely oblivious to community and social factors, even though, as Klinenberg found, these were the factors that ultimately caused the deaths.

Using this and other examples, Jacobs argued that modern political and economic ideologies were in effect no different from those dominant in Western civilization's past Dark Ages, such as medieval Roman Catholicism. In both cases, she claimed, the dominant ideology prevented and discouraged people from finding rational and scientifically verifiable explanations and solutions.

== Reception ==
The New Yorker reviewer Paul Goldberger called the book "a despairing look at the state of things, and like everything Jacobs wrote, it is a curious combination of plainspoken common sense based on simple, empirical observation of the world around her, and broad generalizations about the nature of cities and cultures."
