= William Sclater (writer) =

Scottish-Canadian journalist and naval officer

William Sclater (1906–1980) was a Scottish-Canadian journalist and naval officer, who won the Governor General's Award for English-language non-fiction at the 1947 Governor General's Awards for Haida, his account of the history of the Royal Canadian Navy destroyer HMCS Haida.

Born in Scotland, Sclater served with the British forces in Malaya from 1925 to 1927. He moved to Canada in 1931, joining the Royal Canadian Navy and attaining the rank of lieutenant-commander. He later worked as a journalist and as executive secretary of the Canadian Horse Show Association.

He died on May 27, 1980, at his summer home in Port Sydney, Ontario.
