= International Journal of Motorcycle Studies =

- Discipline: Motorcycling culture
- Language: English
- Edited by: Suzanne Ferriss

Publication details
- History: 2005–
- Publisher: Nova Southeastern University, Farquhar College of Arts and Sciences (United States)
- Frequency: Biannually, spring and fall

Standard abbreviations
- ISO 4: Int. J. Motorcycle Stud.

Indexing
- ISSN: 1931-275X

Links
- Journal homepage

The International Journal of Motorcycle Studies (IJMS) is the first peer-reviewed journal dedicated to the study and discussion of motorcycling culture. The journal considers motorcycling culture in all its forms — from the experience of riding and racing to the history of the machine, the riders and design to the images of motorcycling and motorcyclists in film, advertising and literature.
