= Ross Munro (journalist) =

Canadian war correspondent

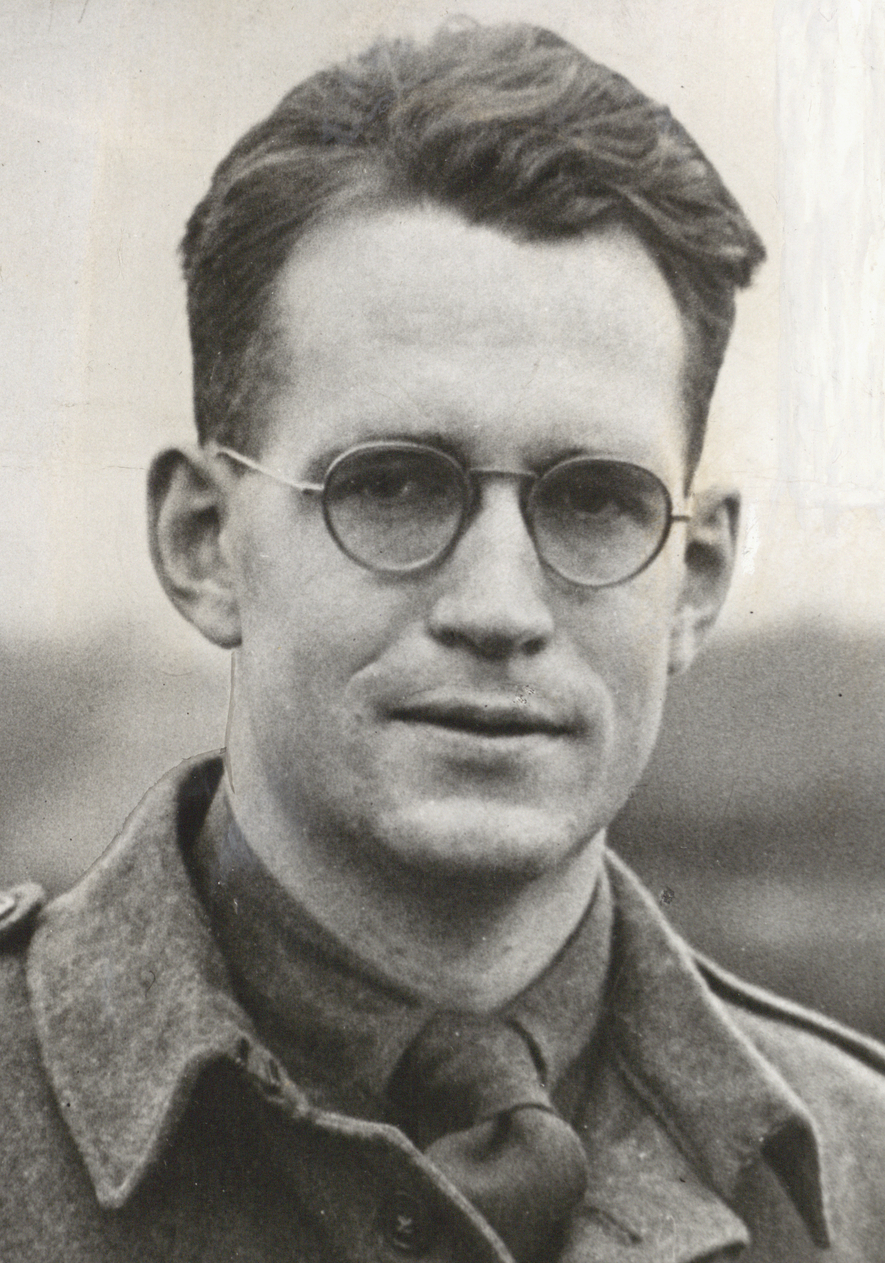

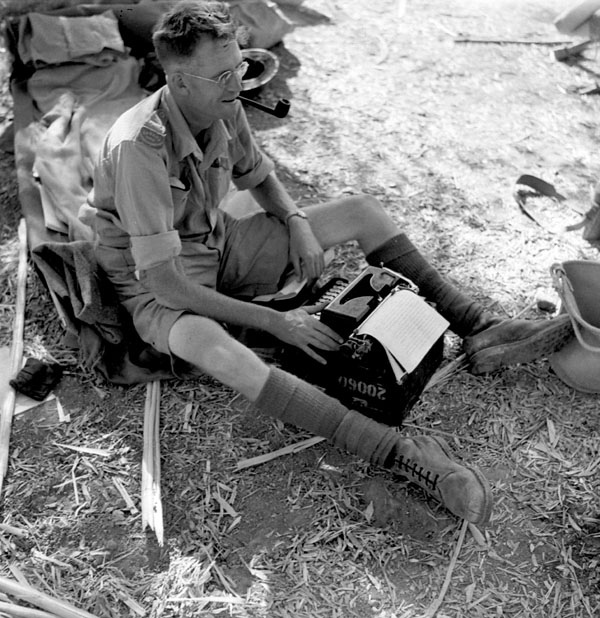
Canadian Press war correspondent Ross Munro typing a story in the battle area between Valguarnera and Leonforte, Italy, August 1943

Robert Ross Munro, OBE, OC (September 6, 1913 — June 21, 1990) was the Canadian Press's lead war correspondent in Europe in World War II.

He covered a Canadian raid in Spitsbergen, the 1942 raid on Dieppe, the Allied landings in Sicily, the Italian campaign, D-Day and the campaign in Northwestern Europe. He was the first Allied journalist to report on the Landings on D Day in 1944.

His memoirs of the campaigns, published as From Gauntlet to Overlord, won the Governor General's Award for English-language non-fiction in 1945.

He later covered the Korean War, and after retiring as a war correspondent became publisher of the Vancouver Daily Province, the Winnipeg Tribune, and the Edmonton Journal. Munro was appointed OBE in 1946 and OC in 1975.

Ross married a physiotherapist from the Canadian Army, Helen Marie Stevens, while overseas in 1943. Together, they had one daughter.

== Legacy ==
The Ross Munro Media Awards for Canadian military writing have been presented each year since 2002 by the Conference of Defence Associations, in concert with the Canadian Defence & Foreign Affairs Institute as an award for providing exceptional media coverage of Canadian defence and security issues. The "MUNRO AWARD" (2002) by André Gauthier is a statuette of Munro commissioned by the Conference of Defence Associations.
