= Canadian Notes & Queries =

Canadian literary magazine

- Categories: Literary
- Frequency: Triannual
- Founder: William Morley
- Founded: 1968; 58 years ago
- Company: Biblioasis
- Country: Canada
- Based in: Windsor, Ontario
- Language: English
- Website: notesandqueries.ca
- ISSN: 0576-5803
- OCLC: 231884953

Canadian Notes & Queries is a literary magazine published in Canada on a triannual basis.

== History and profile ==
The magazine was first published in 1968 by William Morley as a four-page supplement to the Abacus, the newsletter of the Antiquarian Booksellers Association of Canada. Modelled on the British Notes & Queries, it was a journal, as Morley wrote, "of little discoveries encountered, often by serendipity, in the course of scholarly investigation," and queries which often arise in the course of research which are beyond one's "present resources to solve." Morley passed on the magazine to Douglas (now George) Fetherling 22 years later, and Fetherling, sensing that the internet would soon take over the magazine's function as an academic bulletin, reinvented it until it took on something more closely resembling its present format: a journal of literary, cultural and artistic history and criticism. Fetherling continued publishing the magazine with either "charming" or "calculated" irregularity—until 1997, when he passed it on to Tim and Elke Inkster of the Porcupine's Quill. The Inksters published 18 more issues over the next nine years, before selling it to publisher and bookseller Dan Wells' Biblioasis in 2006.

The magazine is edited by Emily Donaldson. With its 79th issue in 2010, the magazine received a radical redesign by the cartoonist Seth.
