= The Dorchester Review =

Canadian history journal

- Editors: C. P. Champion; Michael R. Jackson Bonner; James W. J. Bowden; F. H. Buckley; Ghyslain Hotte; Gregory Melleuish; John Pepall; Phyllis Reeve; John Robson; Alastair Sweeny
- Categories: History and culture
- Frequency: Quarterly
- Circulation: 800
- First issue: June 1, 2011; 15 years ago
- Country: Canada
- Based in: Ottawa
- Language: English
- Website: www.dorchesterreview.ca
- ISSN: 1925-7600

The Dorchester Review, founded in 2011, is a Canadian semi-annual journal of history and historical commentary. The journal describes itself as a non-partisan but "robustly polemical" outlet for "elements of tradition and culture inherent to Canadian experience that fail to conform to a stridently progressivist narrative."

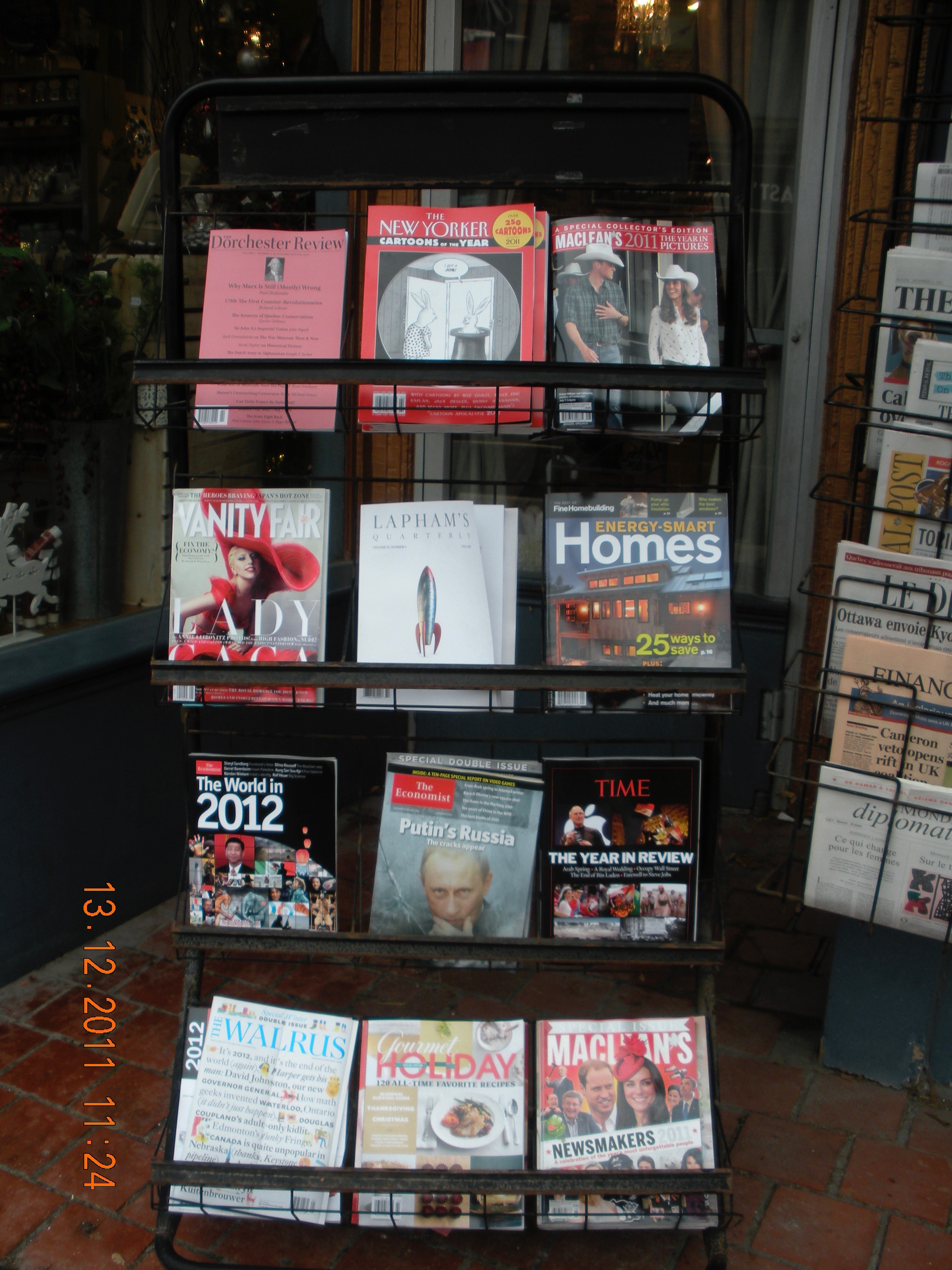
Dorchester Review for sale on a newsstand in The Glebe, Ottawa, November 2011: top left

== Contents ==
The journal includes articles on history as well as historical commentary. The name Dorchester was chosen to honour the 1st Baron Dorchester, Guy Carleton, who served as Governor of the Province of Quebec from 1768 to 1778, and Governor General of British North America from 1785 to 1795. The editors explained in their first editorial in 2011 that the choice of "a bewigged British soldier, an ... unapologetic colonial governor from the pre-democratic era" is intended to underscore the magazine's belief that "history consists of more than a parade of secular modern progressives."

The Review's editors wrote in the first issue's opening editorial:

We confess another potentially unpopular belief: that, at its core, Canada’s strength and advantage — that of a British liberal society with a strong French national enclave, resilient aboriginal communities, and a vital pluralism born of successive immigrant arrivals — would be void if polemically separated from its European, Judeo-Christian and Classical traditions, which is another answer to: why history. We are conscious and grateful heirs to an invaluable if variously pressured tradition of free expression and criticism that is found and defended with particular seriousness in the North Atlantic societies, and this we think should be recognized, protected, and always enhanced.

== Controversies ==
According to news reports, a 2019 Dorchester Review article by Champion entitled "Alberta’s Little History War," said that in Alberta classrooms, the "ongoing fad is that we need 'more' First Nations 'perspectives.'". He said this was faddish because he himself had got a "repetitive" dose of "oolichan, cedar masks, and Trickster stories" in his own elementary school experience during the 1970s. He criticized as "deplorable agitprop" the classroom activity to teach from an alleged Indigenous perspective —the KAIROS Blanket exercise—"brainwashes children into thinking of themselves as ‘settlers’ stealing the land — the kind of 'truth and reconciliation' that is not evidence-based but relies on 'knowledge keepers’ to 'foster truth.'" The blanket exercise has been widely used in Canada in response to the 2015 Truth and Reconciliation Commission (TRC) call for inclusion of indigenous history in school curriculum as essential for improved relationships with non-indigenous people. The TRC gathered approximately 7,000 testimonies from the survivors of residential schools over a six-year period—from 2008 to 2014, according to Justice Murray Sinclair.

== Themes ==
=== The history wars ===
According to a 2013 Toronto Review of Books article, "The History Wars in Canada", in 1998, then-York University history professor, Jack Granatstein "fired the opening shot of the History Wars"—a "fierce conflict about the meaning and purpose" of Canadian history. In his 1998 book, Who Killed Canadian History?, Jack Granatstein said that, since the late 1960s, a new generation of social historians in history departments have waged an ideological war with historians like himself, who defend the traditional narrative history, with a focus on chronology and elite figures in political and military history. He said that in the writing and teaching of history in Canada, the teaching of "hard facts", has been replaced by distorted interpretations of the past that focus on "victimization and blame seeking". Among the reasons for these changes in historiography he included multiculturalism and the whole child approach to learning.

In a 2013 article, Mark Sholdice argued that Champion was one of the "right-wing activists and scholars" leading the history wars in Canada, and moreover that he was "probably the most important Conservative historian in Canada" at that time. Champion's 2010 book, The Strange Demise of British Canada: The Liberals and Canadian Nationalism, 1964-1968, written as his doctoral thesis, Nova Britannia Revisited, between 2004 and 2007, anticipated the Harper administration's views on the writing and teaching of Canadian history. Sholdice added that in 2011, the history wars became a "tangible reality," with the Harper government favouring subjects such as the "military and the monarchy" for "historical attention", and "spending lavishly" on the "commemoration of the War of 1812."

== Media reception ==
National Post columnist Barbara Kay described the Dorchester Review as "politically incorrect and iconoclastic" writing which resists "the prevailing progressivist view that historians must choose between a right and wrong side of history," without catering to a specific ideology. David Frum greeted the Review's launch in 2011 as "one of the most exciting intellectual projects Canada has seen in a long while." Jonathan Kay has described it as "the only high-level publication in Canada that examines our history and traditions without even a passing nod to academic fashions and identity politics." Former Conservative Prime Minister Stephen Harper was observed reading the magazine in the House of Commons of Canada, contributing to its image as a right-wing publication.

Writing in the Literary Review of Canada, professor of European Studies Jerry White cited The Dorchester Review among works that "might...prompt readers to rethink the way in which not all liberals are Liberals and not all conservatives sound like the Conservatives."

In 2017, Champion criticized right-wing counter-protestors for co-opting the Canadian Red Ensign, saying he was "disappointed when the self-described traditionalists of the Proud Boys were captured on video provoking Indigenous protesters with the flag."

In 2022, the Review posted an article by Jacques Rouillard on their blog, suggesting there was no concrete evidence of mass unmarked burials at Indian residential schools. which was cited in an article in the United Kingdom's The Spectator. In 2022, Canada's Crown-Indigenous Relations minister Marc Miller expressed concern about the rise of residential school denialism and rebuked those that criticized "the nature and validity of these and other recovery efforts" following the announcement of the discovery of potentially unmarked graves at the St Joseph's Mission School.

== Notable contributors ==
- George Jonas
- Robin Fisher
- Kevin Myers
- Gregory Melleuish
- Barbara Kay
- Ken Coates
- Andrew Roberts
- Conrad Black
- Graeme Garrard
- Michel Bock
- John Howard
- Narindar Saroop
- Robin Sears
- Alastair Sweeny
- Roger Noriega
- Gil Troy
- Paul Hollander
- Richard Lebrun
- Frédéric Bastien
- David Frum
- Serge Joyal
- John O'Sullivan
- Hugh Bicheno
- Julian Thompson
- Barry Gough
- J. L. Granatstein
- Jonathan Kay
- Andrew P. W. Bennett
- Noah Richler
- Gary A. Mauser
- Lionel Albert
- Paul Cowan
- Pat Stogran
- Ian Brodie
- Randall Hansen
- F. H. Buckley
- Randall Hansen
- Mathieu Bock-Côté
- Kevin Gutzman
- Jonathon Riley
- Rory MacLean
- Touraj Daryaee
- Peter Hoffmann
- Andrew Godefroy
- Jürgen Rüttgers
- Randy Boyagoda
- Allan Levine
- Tom Flanagan
- Frank Dikötter
- James Allan

== See also ==
- Conservatism in Canada
- List of Canadian magazines
- List of literary magazines
- Tory
- Traditionalist conservatism
