= Bibliography of Canadian military history =

This is a bibliography of works on the military history of Canada mainly compiled in 2011 from the Canadiana : the national bibliography with arbitrary additions since then.

== Overviews ==
- Black, Jeremy (2011). Fighting for America: The Struggle for Mastery in North America, 1519–1871. Indiana University Press. ISBN 978-0-253-35660-4.
- Conrad, John (2011). Scarce Heard Amid the Guns: An Inside Look at Canadian Peacekeeping. Dundurn Press. ISBN 978-1-4597-0096-3.
- Douglas, W.A.B. (April 1992). "Marching to Different Drums: Canadian Military History". Journal of Military History. 56 (2): 245–260. doi:10.2307/1985798. JSTOR 1985798. S2CID 164128728. historiography
- Fowler, T. Robert (2013). 'Courage Rewarded'; The Valour of Canadian Soldiers Under Fire 1900–2011. CreateSpace Independent Publishing Platform. ISBN 978-1-4904-7235-5.
- Granatstein, J.L. (2004). Canada's Army: Waging War and Keeping the Peace. University of Toronto Press. ISBN 0-8020-8696-9.
- Granatstein, J.L.; Oliver, Dean F. (2011). The Oxford companion to Canadian military history. Oxford University Press. ISBN 978-0-19-543088-2.
- Horn, Bernd (2008). Show No Fear: Daring Actions in Canadian Military History. Dundurn Press. ISBN 978-1-55002-816-4.
- Horn, Bernd (2006). The Canadian Way of War: Serving the National Interest. Dundurn Press. ISBN 978-1-55002-612-2.
- Horn, Bernd; Harris, Stephen, eds. (2000). Warrior Chiefs: Perspectives on Senior Canadian Military Leaders. Dundurn Press. ISBN 1-55002-351-9.
- Horn, Bernd (2009). Fortune Favours the Brave: Tales of Courage and Tenacity in Canadian Military History. Dundurn Press. ISBN 978-1-55002-841-6.
- Lackenbauer, P. Whitney (2007). Battle Grounds: the Canadian Military and Aboriginal Lands. UBC Press. ISBN 978-0-7748-1315-0.
- Lotz, Jim (1990). Canadians at War. London: Bison Books. ISBN 0-86124-641-1. D2-250/2-2009E.
- McKay, Ian; Swift, Jamie (2012). Warrior Nation: Rebranding Canada in an Age of Anxiety. Between the Lines Books. ISBN 978-1-926662-77-0.
- Milner, Marc, ed. (1993). Canadian Military History – Selected Readings. Toronto: Copp Clark Pittman. ISBN 0-7730-5257-7.
- Morton, Desmond (1999). A Military History of Canada (4th ed.). Toronto: McClelland and Stewart. ISBN 0-7710-6514-0.
- Travers, Timothy; Archer, Christon (2010). Men at War: Politics, Technology and Innovation in the Twentieth Century. Transaction Publishers. ISBN 978-1-4128-1498-0.
- Tucker, Spencer C.; Arnold, James (2011). The Encyclopedia of North American Indian Wars, 1607–1890. ABC-CLIO. ISBN 978-1-85109-697-8.
- Zuehlke, Mark (2006). Canadian Military Atlas: Four Centuries of Conflict from New France to Kosovo. Douglas & McIntyre. ISBN 978-1-55365-209-0.

Official accounts – National Defence and the Canadian Forces

- Bernier, Serge (2000). Canadian Military Heritage, Volume III 1872–2000 (PDF). Montréal: Art Global. ISBN 2-920718-51-7.
- Chartrand, René (1993). Canadian Military Heritage, Volume I, 1000–1754 (PDF). Montréal: Art Global. ISBN 2-920718-49-5.
- Chartrand, René (1993). Canadian Military Heritage, Volume II, 1755–1871 (PDF). Montréal: Art Global. ISBN 2-920718-45-2.
- Goodspeed, D.J (1967). The Armed Forces of Canada 1867–1967: a Century of Achievement (PDF). Ottawa: Queen's Printer.
- Greenhous, Brereton; Harris, Stephen J.; Johnston, William C.; Rawling, William G.P. (1994). The Crucible of War 1939–1945: The Official History of the Royal Canadian Air Force. Vol. 3. University of Toronto Press. ISBN 0-8020-0574-8. Also at Canada.ca
- National Defence Headquarters, ed. (1995). Peacekeeping 1815 to Today (PDF). Ottawa: National Defence. ISBN 0-662-62062-3.
- Tremblay, Yves, ed. (2001). Canadian Military History Since the 17th Century: Proceedings of the Canadian Military History Conference, Ottawa, 5-9 May 2000 (PDF). Ottawa: National Defence. A-JS-007-DHH/AF-001.
- Lackenbauer, P. Whitney; Moses, John; Sheffield, R. Scott; Gohier, Maxime (2010). A Commemorative History of Aboriginal People in the Canadian Military (PDF). Ottawa: National Defence. ISBN 978-1-100-12652-4.

== To 1914 ==
- Anderson, Fred (2000). Crucible of War: The Seven Years' War and the Fate of Empire in British North America, 1754–1766. New York: Knopf. ISBN 0-375-40642-5.
- Barr, Daniel P (2006). Unconquered: The Iroquois League at War in Colonial America. Greenwood Publishing Group. ISBN 0-275-98466-4.
- Baugh, D.A. The Global Seven Years War 1754–1763: Britain and France in a Great Power Contest (2011)
- Berton, Pierre. The Invasion of Canada, 1812–1813. McClelland and Stewart Ltd., 1980. ISBN 0-7710-1235-7
- Berton, Pierre. Flames Across the Border, 1813–1814. McClelland and Stewart Ltd., 1981. ISBN 0-7710-1244-6
- Boulton, Charles A. (1886) Reminiscences of the North-West Rebellions. Toronto.
- Brumwell, Stephen. Redcoats: The British Soldier and War in the Americas, 1755–1763. Cambridge University Press. 2006. ISBN 978-0-521-67538-3.
- Chartrand, René (2008), The Forts of New France in Northeast America 1600–1763, Osprey Pub, ISBN 978-1-84603-255-4
- Chartrand, René (2008), The forts of New France: the Great Lakes, the Plains and the Gulf Coast, 1600–1763, Osprey Pub, ISBN 978-1-84603-504-3
- Choquette, Leslie. Frenchmen into peasants : modernity and tradition in the peopling of French Canada. Cambridge, MA : Harvard University Press, 1997. ISBN
- Cave, Alfred A. (2004), The French and Indian war, Greenwood Press ISBN 0-313-32168-X
- Dale, Ronald J (2003). The Invasion of Canada: Battles of the War of 1812. James Lorimer. ISBN 978-1-55028-738-7.
- Flanagan, Thomas (2000), Riel and the Rebellion: 1885 reconsidered, University of Toronto Press, ISBN 0-8020-4708-4
- Fryer, Mary Beacock (1996), Battlefields of Canada, Dundurn Press, ISBN 1-55002-007-2
- Fryer, Mary Beacock (1993), More battlefields of Canada, Dundurn Press, ISBN 1-55002-189-3
- Donald E. Graves; Derek McLellan (1994). Red coats & grey jackets: the Battle of Chippawa, 5 July, 1814. Dundurn Press Ltd. ISBN 978-1-55002-210-0.
- Jennings, Francis (1988). Empire of Fortune: Crowns, Colonies, and Tribes in the Seven Years War in America. New York: Norton. ISBN 0-393-30640-2.
- Greenblatt, Miriam; John Stewart Bowman (2003), War of 1812, Facts on File, ISBN 0-8160-4936-X
- Hunt, George T. (1972), The wars of the Iroquois, University of Wisconsin Press ISBN 0-299-00164-4
- Hickey, Donald R (1995), The War of 1812: a short history, University of Illinois Press, ISBN 0-252-06430-5
- D. Peter McLeod (17 December 2010). Northern Armageddon: The Battle of the Plains of Abraham. Renouf Pub Co Ltd. ISBN 978-1-55365-315-8.
- Morrissey, Brendan (2003). Quebec 1775: The American Invasion of Canada. Hook, Adam (trans.). Osprey Publishing. ISBN 978-1-84176-681-2.
- Pederson, Charles E. (2010), The French & Indian War, ABDO ISBN 978-1-60453-943-1
- Senior, H. (1996). The last invasion of Canada: The Fenian raids, 1866–1870. Dundurn Press. ISBN 1-55002-085-4
- Sheppard, Ruth (2006), Empires Collide: The French and Indian War 1754-63, Osprey ISBN 1-84603-089-7
- Reid, John G. (2004). The "conquest" of Acadia, 1710: imperial, colonial, and aboriginal constructions, University of Toronto Press ISBN 0-8020-3755-0
- Ross, David (1992), Canadian Campaigns, 1860–1870, pub Osprey, ISBN 1-85532-226-9
- Bruce Vandervort (2006). Indian wars of Mexico, Canada and the United States, 1812–1900. Taylor & Francis. ISBN 978-0-415-22471-0.
- Jack Verney (22 December 1992). The Good Regiment: The Carignan Salieres Regiment in Canada, 1665–1668. McGill-Queen's Press – MQUP. ISBN 978-0-7735-1818-6.
- Wrong, George M. (1968). Canada and the American Revolution: The Disruption of the First British Empire, Rowman & Littlefield Publishers.
- Wrong, George M. and Langton, H.H. (1914) The Chronicles of Canada: Volume II – The Rise of New France Fireship Press (2009), ISBN 1-934757-45-4
- Wrong, George M. (1918), The Conquest of New France: A Chronicle of the Colonial Wars, Yale University Press, ISBN 1-58057-276-6

== 1914 to 1945 ==
=== First World War ===
- Andrew B. Godefroy, ed. (2010). Great War Commands: Historical Perspectives on Canadian Army Leadership 1914-1918 (PDF). Canadian Defence Academy Press. ISBN 978-1-100-15601-9.,
- Armstrong, John Griffith (2002) The Halifax Explosion and the Royal Canadian Navy: Inquiry and Intrigue, UBC Press.
- Barton, Peter; Peter Doyle; Johan Vandewalle (2005). Beneath Flanders fields: the tunnellers' war, 1914–1918. McGill-Queen's Press – MQUP. ISBN 978-0-7735-2949-6.
- Barris, Ted (2007), Victory at Vimy: Canada Comes of Age, April 9–12, 1917, vol. 14, Toronto: Thomas Allen Publishers, ISBN 978-0-88762-253-3
- Bechthold, Mike (2007), "In the Shadow of Vimy Ridge: The Canadian Corps in April and May 1917", in Hayes, Geoffrey; Iarocci, Andrew; Bechthold, Mike (eds.), Vimy Ridge: A Canadian Reassessment, Waterloo: Wilfrid Laurier University Press, pp. 239–264, ISBN 978-0-88920-508-6
- Bechthold, Michael (2007), Vimy Ridge : a Canadian reassessment, Wilfrid Laurier University Press ISBN 978-0-88920-508-6
- Berton P. Vimy. McClelland and Stewart Ltd. 1986. ISBN 0-7710-1339-6
- Brown, Robert Craig; David Clark MacKenzie (2005), Canada and the First World War: essays in honour of Robert Craig Brown, University of Toronto Press, ISBN 0-8020-3573-6
- Campbell, David (2007), "The 2nd Canadian Division: A 'Most Spectacular Battle'", in Hayes, Geoffrey; Iarocci, Andrew; Bechthold, Mike (eds.), Vimy Ridge: A Canadian Reassessment, Waterloo: Wilfrid Laurier University Press, pp. 171–192, ISBN 978-0-88920-508-6
- Cook, Tim. Warlords: Borden, Mackenzie King and Canada's World Wars (2012) 472pp excerpt and text search
- Duff Crerar (2 March 1995). Padres in no man's land: Canadian chaplains and the Great War. McGill-Queen's Press – MQUP. ISBN 978-0-7735-1230-6.
- Busch, Briton Cooper (2003), Canada and the Great War: Western Front Association papers, McGill-Queen's University Press ISBN 0-7735-2546-7
- Cassar, George H (2010), Hell in Flanders Fields: Canadians at the Second Battle of Ypres, Dundurn Press ISBN 978-1-55488-728-6
- Cook, Tim (1999), No Place to Run: The Canadian Corps and Gas Warfare in the First World War, UBC Press, ISBN 0-7748-0739-3
- Cook, Tim (2007) At the Sharp End: Canadians Fighting the Great War, 1914–1916, Viking Canada ISBN 978-0-670-06734-3
- Cook, Tim (2008) Shock Troops: Canadians Fighting the Great War, 1917–1918, Viking Canada ISBN 978-0-670-06735-0
- Cook, Tim (2010) The Madman and the Butcher: The Sensational Wars of Sam Hughes and General Arthur Currie, Penguin Canada ISBN 978-0-670-06403-8
- Freeman, Bill; Richard Nielsen (1998), Far from home: Canadians in the First World War, McGraw-Hill Ryerson, ISBN 0-07-086118-8
- Jeff Keshen (1996). Propaganda and censorship during Canada's Great War. University of Alberta. ISBN 978-0-88864-279-0.
- Godefroy, Andrew (2007a), "The 4th Canadian Division: 'Trenches Should Never be Saved'", in Hayes, Geoffrey; Iarocci, Andrew; Bechthold, Mike (eds.), Vimy Ridge: A Canadian Reassessment, Waterloo: Wilfrid Laurier University Press, pp. 211–224, ISBN 978-0-88920-508-6
- Granatstein, J. L. (2004), Hell's Corner: An Illustrated History of Canada's Great War, 1914–1918, Douglas & McIntyre ISBN 1-55365-047-6
- Michael L. Hadley; Roger Flynn Sarty (1 January 1991). Tin-pots and pirate ships: Canadian naval forces and German sea raiders, 1880–1918. McGill-Queen's Press – MQUP. ISBN 978-0-7735-0778-4.
- Hayes, Geoffrey (2007), "The 3rd Canadian Division: Forgotten Victory", in Hayes, Geoffrey; Iarocci, Andrew; Bechthold, Mike (eds.), Vimy Ridge: A Canadian Reassessment, Waterloo: Wilfrid Laurier University Press, pp. 193–210, ISBN 978-0-88920-508-6
- Kordan, Bohdan S. (2002), Enemy Aliens, Prisoners of War: Internment in Canada during the Great War, McGill-Queen's University Press ISBN 0-7735-2350-2
- MacKenzie, David, ed. Canada and the First World War (2005) 16 essays by leading scholars
- Morton, D. and J. L. Granatstein. Marching to Armaggeddon – Canadians and the Great War 1914–1919. Lester & Dennys Ltd. 1989. ISBN 0-88619-209-9
- Morton, D. (1993). When Your Number's Up – WWI, Random House of Canada ISBN 0-394-22288-1
- Perkins, Dave, "Canada's Submariners 1914–1923", Boston Mills Press, Erin, 1989, ISBN 1-55046-014-5
- Thompson, Julian, "The 1916 Experience: Verdun and the Somme", Seven Oaks, London, 2006, ISBN 978-1-86200-483-2
- Turner, Alexander (2005), Vimy Ridge 1917: Byng's Canadians Triumph at Arras Osprey Publ ISBN 1-84176-871-5
- Zuehlke, Mark (2008). Brave battalion: the remarkable saga of the 16th Battalion (Canadian Scottish) in the First World War. John Wiley and Sons. ISBN 978-0-470-15416-8.
- Timothy C. Winegard (31 October 2011). Indigenous Peoples of the British Dominions and the First World War. Cambridge University Press. ISBN 978-1-107-01493-0.

Official accounts – National Defence and the Canadian Forces

- Brereton Greenhous; Stephen J. Harris (1992) Canada And The Battle Of Vimy Ridge, 9-12 April 1917 Minister Supply and Service (Downloadable PDF) ISBN 0-660-93654-2
- Duguid, A.F, (1938) Official History of the Canadian Forces in the Great War, 1914–1919, Vol I Part I King's Printer, Ottawa, (Downloadable PDF)
- Duguid, A.F, (1938) Official History of the Canadian Forces in the Great War, 1914–1919, Vol I Part 2 King's Printer, Ottawa, (Downloadable PDF)
- Nicholson, G.W.L. (1964) Official History of the Canadian Army in the First World War: Canadian Expeditionary Force, 1914–1919, Duhamel, Queen's Printer and Controller of Stationery, Ottawa (Downloadable PDF)
- Macphail, Sir Andrew (1925) Official History of the Canadian Forces in the Great War: The Medical Services, F.A. Acland, King's Printer, Ottawa (Downloadable PDF)
- Ministry of Overseas Military Forces (1919) Report of the Ministry Overseas Military Forces of Canada – 1918, London : H.M. Stationery Office (Downloadable PDF)
- Snell, A.E. (1924) The C.A.M.C. with the Canadian Corps during the Last Hundred Days of the Great War, F.A. Acland, King's Printer, Ottawa (Downloadable PDF)

=== Spanish Civil War ===
- Michael Petrou (30 August 2008). Renegades: Canadians in the Spanish Civil War. UBC Press. ISBN 978-0-7748-1418-8.
- Zuehlke, Mark (1996) The Gallant Cause: Canadians in the Spanish Civil War, 1936–1939, Wiley & Sons Canada ISBN 978-0-470-83926-3

=== Second World War ===
- Avery, Donald (1998), The science of war : Canadian scientists and allied military technology during the Second World War, University of Toronto Press.
- Barris, Ted. Behind The Glory: The Plan that Won the Allied Air War. Markham, Ontario: Thomas Allen & Son Publishers, 2005. ISBN 0-88762-212-7
- Bashow, David L. All the Fine Young Eagles. Toronto: Stoddard, 1996, ISBN 0-7737-2976-3
- Bryce, Robert Broughton (2005), Canada and the cost of World War II, McGill-Queen's University Press, ISBN 978-0-7735-2938-0
- Boegel, Gary C. (2005). Boys of the Clouds: An Oral History of the 1st Canadian Parachute Battalion 1942–1945. Trafford Publishing. ISBN 978-1-4120-5941-1.
- Jeffrey A. Keshen (2013). Saints, Sinners, and Soldiers: Canada's Second World War. UBC Press. ISBN 978-0-7748-5082-7.
- Boire, Michael (Summer 2004). "Lest We Forget: A Review of Books Marking the 60th Anniversary of D-Day". Canadian Military Journal. 5 (2). on Canadian operations
- Bourrie, Mark (6 August 2011). The Fog of War: Censorship of Canada's Media in World War II. Douglas & McIntyre. ISBN 978-1-55365-949-5.
- Bryden, John. Deadly Allies: Canada's Secret War 1937–1947 (McClelland & Stewart, Toronto, 1989.)
- Burrow, Len & Beaudoin, Emile, Unlucky Lady: The Life and Death of HMCS Athabaskan (Toronto: M&S, 1987), ISBN 0-7710-1812-6
- Chartrand, René; Ronald Volstad (2001), Canadian Forces in World War II, Osprey Publishing, ISBN 1-84176-302-0
- Cook, Tim. Warlords: Borden, Mackenzie King and Canada's World Wars (2012) 472pp excerpt and text search
- Copp, Terry (2004). Fields of Fire: The Canadians in Normandy. University of Toronto Press. ISBN 978-0-8020-3780-0.
- Copp, J. T (2006), Cinderella army: the Canadians in northwest Europe, 1944–1945, University of Toronto Press ISBN 0-8020-3925-1
- Copp, J. T; Richard Nielsen (1995), No price too high: Canadians and the Second World War, McGraw-Hill Ryerson, ISBN 0-07-552713-8
- Copp, J. T (1991), Battle exhaustion: soldiers and psychiatrists in the Canadian army, 1939–1945, McGill-Queen's University Press, ISBN 0-7735-0774-4
- Copp, J. T (2007), The Brigade: The Fifth Canadian Infantry Brigade in World War II, Stackpole Books, ISBN 978-0-8117-3422-6
- Chartrand, René; Ronald Volstad (2001), Canadian Forces in World War II, Osprey Publishing, ISBN 1-84176-302-0
- Coughlin, Tom. The Dangerous Sky: Canadian Airmen in World War II. The Ryerson Press, 1968. ISBN 0-7183-0211-7
- Dickson, Paul Douglas. A Thoroughly Canadian General: A Biography of General H.D.G. Crerar (2007) excerpt and text search
- Dunmore, Spencer, In Great Waters: "The Epic Story of the Battle of the Atlantic 1939–1945 (Toronto: M&S, 1999) ISBN 0-7710-2929-2
- English, John Alan (1991). The Canadian Army and the Normandy campaign: a study of failure in high command, Praeger, ISBN 0-275-93019-X
- Allan Douglas English (20 July 1996). The cream of the crop: Canadian aircrew, 1939–1945. McGill-Queen's Press – MQUP. ISBN 978-0-7735-1398-3.
- Fowler, Robert (1995) Valour in the victory campaign : the 3rd Canadian Infantry Division gallantry decorations, General Store Pub. House ISBN 1-896182-15-1
- Fraser, Doug, Postwar Casualty: Canada's Merchant Navy (Pottersfield Press, Lawrencetown Beach, 1997), ISBN 1-895900-07-7
- Goddard, Lance (2004). D-Day: Juno Beach, Canada's 24 Hours of Destiny. Dundurn Press. ISBN 1-55002-492-2.
- Granatstein, J. L. and D. Morton. A Nation Forged in Fire. Lester & Orpen Dennys Ltd. 1989. ISBN 0-88619-213-7
- Granatstein, J.L. (2011). "'What is to be Done?' The Future of Canadian Second World War History". Canadian Military Journal. 11 (2). historiography
- Granatstein; J. L. The Generals: The Canadian Army's Senior Commanders in the Second World War (Don Mills, Ont.: Stoddart, 1993) ISBN 978-0773757288, 978-0773727304, OCLC 865183109
- Granatstein, J. L. (2004), Canada's army: waging war and keeping the peace, University of Toronto Press, ISBN 0-8020-8696-9
- Granatstein, J. L. (2005), The last good war : an illustrated history of Canada in the Second World War, 1939–1945, Douglas & McIntyre ISBN 1-55054-913-8
- Granatstein, J. L. Canada's War: The Politics of the Mackenzie King Government. Oxford UP, (1975).
- Brereton Greenhous; James McWilliams; R. James Steel; Kevin R. Shackleton; George H. Cassar; Bruce Cane (2014). The Torch We Throw. Dundurn. ISBN 978-1-4597-3030-4.
- Greenhous, Brereton; W. A. B. Douglas (1996). Out of the Shadows: Canada in the Second World War. Dundurn Press Ltd. ISBN 978-1-55488-260-1.
- Greenhous, Harris, Johnston, & Rawling, "The Crucible of War 1939–1945: The Official History of the Royal Canadian Air Force Volume 3", University of Toronto Press, Toronto, 1994, ISBN 0-8020-0574-8
- Michael L. Hadley (1990), U-Boats Against Canada: German Submarines in Canadian Waters, Mcgill Canada ISBN 0-7735-0801-5
- Harbron, John D., "The Longest Battle: The RCN in the Atlantic 1939–1945", Vanwell, St. Catherines, 1995
- Harvey, J. Douglas, "Boys, Bombs, and Brussels Sprouts", M&S, Halifax, 1982, ISBN 0-88780-107-2 (RCAF No. 6 Group, Bomber Command)
- Hayes, Geoffrey (2017). Crerar's Lieutenants. Vancouver, BC Canada: UBC Press. ISBN 978-0-7748-3484-1.
- Hayes, Geoffrey et al. eds. Canada and the Second World War: Essays in Honour of Terry Copp (2012) specialized essays by scholars excerpt
- Bernd Horn (2010). Men of Steel: Canadian Paratroopers in Normandy, 1944. Dundurn Press Ltd. ISBN 978-1-55488-708-8.
- Keshen, Jeffrey A. Saints, Sinners, and Soldiers: Canada's Second World War (2004)
- Iarocci, Andrew (2008), Shoestring soldiers: the 1st Canadian Division at war, 1914–1915, University of Toronto Press ISBN 978-0-8020-9822-1
- Johnston, Mac (2008). Corvettes Canada: Convoy Veterans of WWII Tell Their True Stories. Wiley. ISBN 978-0-470-15429-8.
- Jeff Keshen (2004). Saints, sinners, and soldiers: Canada's Second World War. UBC Press. ISBN 978-0-7748-0923-8.
- Kelsey, Marion (1997), Victory harvest: diary of a Canadian in the Women's Land Army, 1940–1944, McGill-Queen's University Press ISBN 0-7735-1663-8
- Charles D. Kipp (2005). Because We Are Canadians: A Battlefield Memoir. Douglas & McIntyre. ISBN 978-1-55365-112-3.
- Knowles Middleton, W.E., Radar Development in Canada: The Radio Branch of the National Research Council of Canada, 1939–1946, Wilfrid Laurier University Press, Waterloo, Ontario, 1981.
- Lamb, James B., A Bloody War M&S, Toronto, 1990, ISBN 0-7710-4734-7
- Lamb, James B. The Corvette War Signet Books, Scarborough, 1979, ISBN 0-7723-0015-1
- Lamb, James B. On the Triangle Run (Totem, Toronto, 1987) ISBN 0-00-217909-1
- Lynch, Thomas G. Canada's Flowers: History of the Corvettes of Canada Nimbus, Halifax, 1983, ISBN 0-920852-15-7
- Macpherson, Burgess. The Ships of Canada's Naval Forces 1910–1985 (Collins, Toronto, 1981)
- Macpherson, Ken, The River Class Destroyers of the Royal Canadian Navy Charles J. Mussen Publishers, Toronto, 1985, ISBN 0-920845-00-2
- McIntosh, Dave, "Terror in the Starboard Seat", PaperJacks, Markham, 1981, ISBN 0-7701-0183-6 (RCAF 418 Squadron Intruder ops)
- Morton, Desmond and Granatstein, J. L. Victory 1945, Phyllis Bruce books, Toronto, 1995, ISBN 0-00-255069-5
- Mowat, Farley (1979). And No Birds Sang. McClelland & Stewart. ISBN 978-0-7710-6618-4.
- Gil Murray (2001). The invisible war: the untold secret story of Number One Canadian Special Wireless Group, Royal Canadian Signal Corps, 1944–1946. Dundurn Press Ltd. ISBN 978-1-55002-371-8.
- Nadler, John (2006), A perfect hell : the forgotten story of the Canadian commandos of the Second World War, Anchor Canada, ISBN 0-385-66141-X
- Peden, Murray (2003), Thousand shall fall : the true story of a Canadian bomber pilot in world war two, Dundurn Press ISBN 1-55002-454-X
- Pierson, Ruth Roach. Canadian Women and the Second World War. Ottawa: Canadian Historical Association, 1983. No ISBN
- Rickard, John. Politics of Command: Lieutenant-General A.G.L. McNaughton and the Canadian Army, 1939–1943 (2009)
- Robertson, Ian (2007), While bullets fly : the story of a Canadian field surgical unit in the Second World War, Trafford ISBN 978-1-4251-3512-6
- Rogge, Robert E. (2005), Fearsome battle: with the Canadian Army in World War II Europe, Camroc Press ISBN 0-9754503-5-2
- Saunders, Tim (2004), Juno Beach: 3rd Canadian & 79th armoured divisions, McGill-Queen's University Press ISBN 0-7735-2792-3
- Skaarup, Harold A (2005), Out of Darkness-Light: A History of Canadian Military Intelligence, iUniverse, ISBN 0-595-67184-5
- Stacey, C. P. Arms, Men and Governments: The War Policies of Canada 1939–1945 (1970), the standard scholarly history of WWII policies; online free
- Toman, Cynthia (2007), An officer and a lady: Canadian military nursing and the Second World War, University of British Columbia Press ISBN 978-0-7748-1447-8
- The Canadians at War 1939/45 Volume 1, Reader's Digest, Canada, 4th printing, 1976, SBN 0-88850-161-7
- The Canadians at War 1939/45 Volume 2, Reader's Digest, Canada, 4th printing, 1976, SBN 0-88850-161-7
- Vogel, Robert; Brian Padair Farrell (2004). Leadership and responsibility in the Second World War: essays in honour of Robert Vogel. McGill-Queen's Press – MQUP. ISBN 978-0-7735-2731-7.
- Whitton, Charlotte. Canadian Women in the War Effort. Toronto: The Macmillan company of Canada limited, 1942. No ISBN
- Ziegler, Mary. We Serve That Men May Fly – The Story of the Women's Division of the Royal Canadian Air Force. Hamilton: RCAF (WD) Association, 1973. No ISBN.
- Zuehlke, Mark (1999) Ortona: Canada's Epic World War II Battle, Douglas & McIntyre ISBN 1-55054-557-4
- Zuehlke, Mark (2001) The Liri Valley: Canada's World War II Breakthrough to Rome, Douglas & McIntyre ISBN 1-55365-013-1
- Zuehlke, Mark (2003) The Gothic Line: Canada's Month of Hell in WWII Italy, Douglas & McIntyre ISBN 1-55365-023-9
- Zuehlke, Mark (2004) Juno Beach: Canada's D-Day Victory – June 6, 1944, Douglas & McIntyre ISBN 1-55365-050-6
- Zuehlke, Mark (2005) Holding Juno: Canada's Heroic Defence of the D-Day Beaches – June 7–12, 1944, Douglas & McIntyre ISBN 1-55365-194-4
- Zuehlke, Mark (2007) Terrible Victory : First Canadian Army and the Scheldt Estuary Campaign, September 13-November 6, 1944, Douglas & McIntyre ISBN 978-1-55365-404-9
- Zuehlke, Mark (2008) Operation Husky: The Canadian Invasion of Sicily, July 10–August 7, 1943, Douglas & McIntyre ISBN 978-1-55365-539-8
- Zuehlke, Mark (2010) On to Victory: The Canadian Liberation of the Netherlands, March 23–May 5, 1945, Douglas & McIntyre ISBN 978-1-55365-430-8
- Zuehlke, Mark (2011) Breakout from Juno: First Canadian Army and the Normandy Campaign – July 4–August 21, 1944, Douglas & McIntyre ISBN 978-1-55365-325-7
- Mark Zuehlke (2014). Terrible Victory: First Canadian Army and the Scheldt Estuary Campaign: September 13 – November 6, 1944. Douglas & Mcintyre. ISBN 978-1-77162-030-7.

Official accounts – National Defence and the Canadian Forces

- Stacey, C P. (1948) The Canadian Army, 1939–1945 : An Official Historical Summary King's Printer, Ottawa (Downloadable PDF)
- Stacey, C P. (1970) Arms, Men and Governments: The War Policies of Canada, 1939–1945 Queen's Printer, Ottawa (Downloadable PDF)
- Stacey, C P. (1955) Official History of the Canadian Army in the Second World War, Vol I Six Years of War, Queen's Printer, Ottawa (Downloadable PDF)
- Nicholson, G. W. L. (1956) Official history of the Canadian Army in the Second World War, Vol II The Canadians in Italy, Queen's Printer, Ottawa (Downloadable PDF)
- Stacey, C P. (1960) Official History of the Canadian Army in the Second World War, Vol III The Victory Campaign: The Operations in Northwest Europe, 1944-45, Queen's Printer, Ottawa (Downloadable PDF)
- Feasby, W.R. (1956) Official History of the Canadian Medical Services, 1939–1945, Vol 1 Organization and Campaigns Queen's Printer, Ottawa (Downloadable PDF)
- McAndrew, Bill; Bill Rawling, Michael Whitby (1995) Liberation: The Canadians in Europe Art Global (Downloadable PDF) ISBN 2-920718-59-2

== 1945 to present ==
- Gosselin, Daniel (2008). "Hellyer's ghosts : unification of the Canadian Forces is 40 years old – part one". Canadian Military Journal. 9 (2): 6–15.
- — (2009). "Hellyer's ghosts : unification of the Canadian Forces is 40 years old – part two". Canadian Military Journal. 9 (3): 6–16.
- Kasurak, Peter. A National Force: The Evolution of Canada's Army, 1950–2000 (Vancouver: UBC Press, 2013)

=== Cold war ===
- Isabel Campbell (2013). Unlikely Diplomats: The Canadian Brigade in Germany, 1951–64. UBC Press. ISBN 978-0-7748-2565-8.
- Bashow, David L., "Starfighter: A Loving Retrospective of the CF-104 Era in Canadian Fighter Aviation 1961–1986", Fortress Publications, Toronto, 1990 ISBN 0-919195-12-1
- Andrew B. Godefroy (30 April 2011). Defence and Discovery: Canada's Military Space Program, 1945–74. UBC Press. ISBN 978-0-7748-1959-6.
- Bernd Horn (20 June 2011). From Cold War to New Millennium: The History of the Royal Canadian Regiment, 1953–2008. Dundurn Press Ltd. ISBN 978-1-55488-898-6.
- P. Whitney Lackenbauer (2013). The Canadian Rangers: A Living History. UBC Press. ISBN 978-0-7748-2454-5.
- Lynch, Thomas G., "The Flying 400: Canada's Hydrofoil Project", Nimbus, Halifax, 1983, ISBN 0-920852-22-X
- Mills, Carl, "Banshees in the Royal Canadian Navy", Banshee Publication, Willowdale, 1991 ISBN 0-9695200-0-X
- Ernie Regehr (1 January 1987). Arms Canada: the deadly business of military exports. James Lorimer & Company. ISBN 978-0-88862-959-3.
- Soward, Stuart E., "Hands to Flying Stations Volume 1: A Recollective History of Canadian Naval Aviation 1945–1954", Neptune, Victoria, 1993, ISBN 0-9697229-0-7
- Randall Wakelam (10 November 2011). Cold War Fighters: Canadian Aircraft Procurement, 1945–54. UBC Press. ISBN 978-0-7748-2148-3.

=== Korean War ===
- Bercuson, David J. (1999) Blood on the Hills: The Canadian Army in the Korean War University of Toronto Press, ISBN 0-8020-0980-8
- Johnston, William Cameron (2003), A war of patrols: Canadian Army operations in Korea, Canadian War Museum UBC Press, ISBN 0-7748-1008-4
- Dan Bjarnason; Adrienne Clarkson; Peter Mansbridge (2 April 2011). Triumph at Kapyong: Canada's Pivotal Battle in Korea. Dundurn Press Ltd. ISBN 978-1-55488-872-6.
- Melady, John, "Korea: Canada's Forgotten War", MacMillan, Toronto, 1983, ISBN 0-7715-9278-7
- Meyers, Edward C., "Thunder in the Morning Calm", Vanwell Publishing, St. Catherines, 1992, ISBN 0-920277-71-3

Official accounts – National Defence and the Canadian Forces

- Historical Section General Staff, Army Headquarters (1956) Canada's Army in Korea: The United Nations Operations, 1950–53, and Their Aftermath Queen's Printer (Downloadable PDF)
- Wood, F.W (1966) Official History of the Canadian Army in Korea: Strange Battleground Queen's Printer, Ottawa (Downloadable PDF)
- Thorgrimmson, E.C. Russell (1956) Canadian Naval Operations in Korean Waters, 1950–1955 Naval Historical Section, Canadian Forces Headquarters, Ottawa (Downloadable PDF)

=== Rwanda ===
- Romeo Dallaire (21 October 2003). Shake Hands With the Devil: The Failure of Humanity in Rwanda. Random House of Canada. ISBN 978-0-67931-171-3.

=== Congo ===
- Kevin Alexander Spooner (31 August 2009). Canada, the Congo crisis, and UN peacekeeping, 1960–64. UBC Press. ISBN 978-0-7748-1636-6.

=== Yugoslav ===
- Gamme, Nicholas (2001) From peacekeeping to peacemaking: Canada's response to the Yugoslav crisis, McGill-Queen's University Press ISBN 0-7735-2151-8

=== Croatia ===
- Carol Off (18 October 2005). The Ghosts of Medak Pocket: The Story of Canada's Secret War. Random House Digital, Inc. ISBN 978-0-679-31294-9.

=== Somalia ===
- Grant Dawson (2007). "Here is hell": Canada's engagement in Somalia. UBC Press. ISBN 978-0-7748-1297-9.
- Sherene Razack (2004). Dark threats and white knights: the Somalia Affair, peacekeeping, and the new imperialism. University of Toronto Press. ISBN 978-0-8020-8663-1.

=== Afghanistan ===
- Anne Nivat (5 May 2006). Islamistes: Comment ils nous voient. Fayard. ISBN 978-2-25312-917-2.
- Anne Nivat (7 October 2011). Les brouillard de la guerre: Dernière mission en Afghanistan. Fayard. ISBN 978-2-21366-584-9.
- Anne Nivat (15 October 2006). The Wake of War: Encounters with the People of Iraq and Afghanistan. Beacon Press. ISBN 978-0-80700-239-1.
- Bernd Horn (3 April 2012). No Easy Task: Fighting in Afghanistan. Dundurn. ISBN 978-1-45970-162-5.
- Bernd Horn; R. J. (FRW) Hillier (2010). No Lack of Courage: Operation Medusa, Afghanistan. Dundurn Press Ltd. ISBN 978-1-55488-766-8.
- Chris Wattie (26 February 2010). Contact Charlie: The Canadian Army, the Taliban and the Battle that Saved Afghanistan. Key Porter Books. ISBN 978-1-55470-276-3.
- Christie Blatchford (28 October 2008). Fifteen Days: Stories of Bravery, Friendship, Life and Death from Inside the New Canadian Army. Random House Digital, Inc. ISBN 978-0-385-66467-7.
- Fabrice De Pierrebourg (27 September 2010). Martyrs d'une guerre perdue d'avance: Le Canada en Afghanistan. Stanke. ISBN 978-2-76041-073-2.
- Jody Mitic (15 September 2015). Unflinching: The Making of a Canadian Sniper. Simon & Schuster. ISBN 978-1-47679-510-2.
- John Conrad (1 June 2009). What the Thunder Said: Reflections of a Canadian Officer in Kandahar. Dundurn. ISBN 978-1-55488-408-7.
- Kevin Patterson; Jane Warren (5 August 2008). Outside the Wire: The War in Afghanistan in the Words of its Participants. Random House of Canada. ISBN 978-0-30735-631-4.
- Lee Windsor (3 January 2012). Kandahar Tour: The Turning Point in Canadas Afghan Mission. John Wiley & Sons. ISBN 978-0-47015-761-9.
- Marc Dauphin (9 November 2013). Combat Doctor: Life and Death Stories from Kandahars Military Hospital. Dundurn. ISBN 978-1-45971-926-2.
- Mark Gasparotto (26 October 2010). Clearing the Way: Combat Engineers in Kandahar. Ardith Publishing. ISBN 978-1-92658-259-7.
- Mike Friscolanti (24 October 2005). Friendly Fire: The Untold Story of the U.S. Bombing that Killed Four Canadian Soldiers in Afghanistan. Wiley. ISBN 978-0-47083-686-6.
- Ray Wiss (1 March 2011). A Line in the Sand: Canadians at War in Kandahar. Douglas & McIntyre. ISBN 978-1-55365-592-3.
- Ray Wiss (24 August 2009). FOB Doc: A Doctor on the Front Lines in Afghanistan. Douglas And McIntyre. ISBN 978-1-55365-472-8.
- René Vallerand (1 November 2014). Vandoo: Une histoire sur le 22e Régiment. Adrenaline. ISBN 978-2-98140-820-4.
- Rob Semrau (17 September 2012). The Taliban Don't Wave. Wiley. ISBN 978-1-11826-118-7.
- Ron Corbett; Foreword by Pat Stogran (28 April 2012). First Soldiers Down: Canada's Friendly Fire Deaths in Afghanistan. Dundurn. ISBN 978-1-45970-327-8.
- Ryan Flavelle (17 October 2011). The Patrol: Seven Days in the Life of a Canadian Soldier in Afghanistan. HarperCollins Publishers Ltd. ISBN 978-1-44340-717-5.
- Steve Jourdain (9 April 2013). Mon Afghanistan. Athéna. ISBN 978-2-92414-205-9.
- Stéphane Coulombe (30 September 2014). Nos héros en sol Afghan. Les Éditions GID. ISBN 978-2-89634-219-8.
- Sony Chris Marchal (30 November 2014). Peur et dégoût en Afghanistan: Témoignage d'un militaire canadien. Les Éditions Québec-Livres. ISBN 978-2-76402-399-0.
- Valerie Fortney (30 October 2012). Sunray: The Death and Life of Nichola Goddard. McArthur & Company. ISBN 978-1-77087-072-7.

== Nuclear weapons ==
- John Clearwater (1998), Canadian nuclear weapons: the untold story of Canada's Cold War arsenal, Dundurn Press Ltd., ISBN 978-1-55002-299-5
- John Clearwater (1999). U.S. nuclear weapons in Canada. Dundurn Press Ltd. ISBN 978-1-55002-329-9.
- Andrew Richter (2002), Avoiding Armageddon: Canadian military strategy and nuclear weapons, 1950–63, UBC Press, ISBN 978-0-7748-0888-0
- Sean M. Maloney (25 July 2007). Learning to love the bomb: Canada's nuclear weapons during the Cold War. Potomac Books, Inc. ISBN 978-1-57488-616-0.
- Brian Buckley (2000). Canada's early nuclear policy: fate, chance and character. McGill-Queen's Press – MQUP. ISBN 978-0-7735-2077-6.

== Leaders ==
- Cook, Tim. Warlords: Borden, Mackenzie King and Canada's World Wars (2012) 472pp online, on the prime ministers in the world wars
- Horn, Bernd (2001) Warrior chiefs: perspectives on senior Canadian military leaders, Dundurn Press ISBN 1-55002-351-9
- Bernd Horn; John Scott Cowan (2007). Intrepid Warriors: Perspectives on Canadian Military Leaders. Dundurn Press Ltd. ISBN 978-1-55002-711-2.
- Bernd Horn; Roch Legault (28 February 2007). Loyal Service: Perspectives on French-Canadian Military Leaders. Dundurn Press Ltd. ISBN 978-1-55002-693-1.

== Special forces ==
- Horn, Bernd; Tony Balasevicius (28 February 2007). Casting light on the shadows: Canadian perspectives on special operations forces. Dundurn Press Ltd. ISBN 978-1-55002-694-8.
- Emily Spencer (2009). The difficult war: perspectives on insurgency and special operations forces. Dundurn Press Ltd. ISBN 978-1-55488-441-4.
- Emily Spencer (24 May 2010). Solving the People Puzzle: Cultural Intelligence and Special Operations Forces. Dundurn Press Ltd. ISBN 978-1-55488-750-7.
- Ibp Usa (31 July 2015). Canada Intelligence, Security Activities and Operations Handbook Volume 1 Intelligence Service Organizations, Regulations, Activities. Int'l Business Publications. ISBN 978-0-7397-1615-1.

== Aviation ==
- The Arrowheads, "Arrow: The Story of the Avro Arrow from its Evolution to its Extinction", Boston Mills Press, Erin, 1980, ISBN 0-919822-35-5
- Barris, Ted. Behind The Glory: The Plan that Won the Allied Air War. Markham, Ontario: Thomas Allen & Son Publishers, 2005. ISBN 0-88762-212-7
- Bashow, David L., "All the Fine Young Eagles", Stoddard, Toronto, 1996, ISBN 0-7737-2976-3
- Bashow, David L., "Starfighter: A Loving Retrospective of the CF-104 Era in Canadian Fighter Aviation 1961–1986", Fortress Publications, Toronto, 1990 ISBN 0-919195-12-1
- Edmund Cosgrove; Brick Billing (1 April 2003). Canada's Fighting Pilots. Dundurn Press Ltd. ISBN 978-0-919614-97-0.
- Coughlin, Tom. The Dangerous Sky: Canadian Airmen in World War II. The Ryerson Press, 1968. ISBN 0-7183-0211-7
- Deere, Captain David N. ed., "Desert Cats: The Canadian Fighter Squadron in the Gulf War", Fortress Publications, Stoney Creek, 1991, ISBN 0-919195-13-X
- Dempsey, Daniel V. A Tradition of Excellence: Canada's Airshow Team Heritage. Victoria, BC: High Flight Enterprises, 2002. ISBN 0-9687817-0-5.
- Foster, J. A., "Sea Wings: A Pictorial History of Canada's Waterborne Defence Aircraft", Meuthen, Toronto, 1986, ISBN 0-458-80410-X
- Larry F. Gray (2013). Red Roads to Runways: The Story of the Royal Canadian Air Force at Summerside. FriesenPress. ISBN 978-1-4602-0443-6.
- Greenhous, Brereton (2002). The making of Billy Bishop: the First World War exploits of Billy Bishop, VC. Dundurn Press Ltd. ISBN 978-1-55002-390-9.
- Greenhous, Brereton; Halliday, Hugh A. Canada's Air Forces, 1914–1999. Montreal: Editions Art Global and the Department of National Defence, 1999. ISBN 2-920718-72-X.
- Greenhous, Harris, Johnston, & Rawling, "The Crucible of War 1939–1945: The Official History of the Royal Canadian Air Force Volume 3", University of Toronto Press, Toronto, 1994, ISBN 0-8020-0574-8
- Hatch, F.J. Aerodrome of Democracy: Canada and the British Commonwealth Air Training Plan 1939–1945. Ottawa: Canadian Department of National Defence, 1983. ISBN 0-660-11443-7
- Milberry, Larry, ed. Sixty Years—The RCAF and CF Air Command 1924–1984. Toronto: Canav Books, 1984. ISBN 0-9690703-4-9
- Milberry, Larry. Aviation in Canada: Evolution of an Air Force. Toronto: Canav Books, 2010. ISBN 978-0-921022-23-7.
- Mills, Carl, "Banshees in the Royal Canadian Navy", Banshee Publication, Willowdale, 1991 ISBN 0-9695200-0-X
- Pigott, Peter (1996), Flying Canucks: Famous Canadian aviators, Hounslow Press, ISBN 0-88882-175-1
- Pigott, Peter (1996), Flying CanucksII: Pioneers of Canadian Aviation, Hounslow Press, ISBN 0-88882-175-1
- Roberts, Leslie. There Shall Be Wings. Toronto: Clark, Irwin and Co. Ltd., 1959. No ISBN.
- Shores, Christopher, "History of the Royal Canadian Air Force", Royce Publishing, Toronto, 1984, ISBN 0-86124-160-6
- Soward, Stuart E., "Hands to Flying Stations Volume 1: A Recollective History of Canadian Naval Aviation 1945–1954", Neptune, Victoria, 1993, ISBN 0-9697229-0-7

== Naval ==
- Arbuckle, J. Graeme, "Badges of the Canadian Navy", Nimbus, Halifax, 1987, ISBN 0-920852-49-1
- Burrow, Len & Beaudoin, Emile, "Unlucky Lady: The Life and Death of HMCS Athabaskan", M&S, Toronto, 1987, ISBN 0-7710-1812-6
- "Canada's Navy Annual", Corvus Publishing, Calgary, 1986
- Dunmore, Spencer, "In Great Waters: "The Epic Story of the Battle of the Atlantic 1939–1945", M&S, Toronto, 1999, ISBN 0-7710-2929-2
- Foster, J. A., "Sea Wings: A Pictorial History of Canada's Waterborne Defence Aircraft", Meuthen, Toronto, 1986, ISBN 0-458-80410-X
- Fraser, Doug, "Postwar Casualty: Canada's Merchant Navy", Pottersfield Press, Lawrencetown Beach, 1997, ISBN 1-895900-07-7
- Hadley, Michael L (1996), A nation's navy: in quest of Canadian naval identity, McGill-Queen's University Press, ISBN 0-7735-1506-2
- Hadley, Michael L., U-Boats Against Canada: German Submarines in Canadian Waters, Mcgill Canada, 1990 ISBN 0-7735-0801-5
- Harbron, John D., "The Longest Battle: The RCN in the Atlantic 1939–1945", Vanwell, St. Catherines, 1995
- Johnston, Mac (2008). Corvettes Canada: Convoy Veterans of WWII Tell Their True Stories. Wiley. ISBN 978-0-470-15429-8.
- Lamb, James B., "A Bloody War", M&S, Toronto, 1990, ISBN 0-7710-4734-7
- Lamb, James B., "The Corvette War", Signet Books, Scarborough, 1979, ISBN 0-7723-0015-1
- Lamb, James B., "On the Triangle Run", Totem, Toronto, 1987, ISBN 0-00-217909-1
- Lynch, Thomas G. "Canada's Flowers: History of the Corvettes of Canada", Nimbus, Halifax, 1983, ISBN 0-920852-15-7
- Lynch, Thomas G., "The Flying 400: Canada's Hydrofoil Project", Nimbus, Halifax, 1983, ISBN 0-920852-22-X
- Macpherson, Ken, "The River Class Destroyers of the Royal Canadian Navy", Charles J. Mussen Publishers, Toronto, 1985, ISBN 0-920845-00-2
- Macpherson, Ken & Burgess, John, "The Ships of Canada's Naval Forces 1910–1993", Vanwell, St. Catherines, 1994, ISBN 0-920277-91-8
- Mills, Carl, "Banshees in the Royal Canadian Navy", Banshee Publication, Willowdale, 1991 ISBN 0-9695200-0-X
- Milner, Marc (2010), Canada's Navy: The First Century, Univ. of Toronto Press, ISBN 978-0-8020-9604-3
- Perkins, Dave, "Canada's Submariners 1914–1923", Boston Mills Press, Erin, 1989, ISBN 1-55046-014-5
- Schull, Joseph. Ships of the Great Days: Canada's Navy in World War II, in series, Great Stories of Canada. Macmillan, Toronto, 1962. 156 p., ill.
- Snowie, J. Allen, "The Bonnie: HMCS Bonaventure", Boston Mills Press, Erin, 1987, ISBN 0-919783-40-6
- Soward, Stuart E., "Hands to Flying Stations Volume 1: A Recollective History of Canadian Naval Aviation 1945–1954", Neptune, Victoria, 1993, ISBN 0-9697229-0-7

== Academies and museums ==
- Richard Arthur Preston (1 January 1991). To serve Canada: a history of the Royal Military College since the Second World War. University of Ottawa Press. ISBN 978-0-7766-0327-8.
- Raymond Moriyama (2006). In search of a soul: designing and realizing the new Canadian War Museum. Douglas & McIntyre. ISBN 978-1-55365-207-6.
- Dan McCaffery (1 June 2000). Canada's Warplanes: Unique Aircraft in Canada's Aviation Museums. James Lorimer & Company. ISBN 978-1-55028-699-1.

== Law ==
- Teresa Iacobelli (2013). Death Or Deliverance: Canadian Courts Martial in the Great War. UBC Press. ISBN 978-0-7748-2569-6.
- Chris Madsen (6 January 2000). Another Kind of Justice: Canadian Military Law from Confederation to Somalia. UBC Press. ISBN 978-0-7748-0719-7.
- Peter Neary; J. L. Granatstein (14 May 1999). The Veterans Charter and Post-World War II Canada. McGill-Queen's Press – MQUP. ISBN 978-0-7735-1697-7.

== Orders, decorations, and medals ==
- Reynolds, Ken (2008). Pro Valore: Canada's Victoria Cross (PDF) (2 ed.). Ottawa: Queen's Printer for Canada. Archived from the original (PDF) on 2015-09-23.
- Department of National Defence (1 April 2020). Canadian Honours and Awards bestowed upon members of the Canadian Forces (PDF). Ottawa: Queen's Printer for Canada. A-DH-300-000/JD-010.
- Department of National Defence (2020). Honours & Recognition for the Men and Women of the Canadian Forces (PDF). Ottawa: Queen's Printer for Canada. A-DH-300-000/AF-014.
- "Canadian Medals Chart". Canada.ca. Department of National Defence. 12 August 2021.

== See also ==
- Military history of Canada References
- Bibliography of Canada
- History of the Royal Canadian Navy
- History of the Canadian Army
- History of the Royal Canadian Air Force
- List of Canadian military operations
- List of Canadian Peacekeeping Missions
- Military history of Canada
- Victoria Cross (Canada)
  - Lists of books
  - List of bibliographies
