= Who Killed Canadian History? =

1998 book by J. L. Granatstein

- Cover of the first edition
- Author: J. L. Granatstein
- Subject: Canadian historiography; history pedagogy
- Published: 1998 (HarperCollins)
- ISBN: 0-00-255759-2

Who Killed Canadian History? is a 1998 book by the Canadian historian J. L. Granatstein. The book argues that Canadians lack national unity because of their failure to teach their country's history. Granatstein contends that multiculturalism, social historians and weak history teaching standards are responsible for Canada's lack of a historical narrative. He advocates for a greater emphasis on the study of Canadian history in schools and university history departments, especially political and military history.

The 1980s and 1990s saw increasing disputes among Canadian historians, splitting between political and social historians. The historian Adam Chipnick describes Who Killed Canadian History? as "the pinnacle" of these disputes, termed the "history wars". According to Granatstein, the expanding reach of social historians in the history departments of Canadian universities has resulted in ineffectual and uneducated graduates. He further argues that poor teaching standards and political correctness have led to historical ignorance among Canadians, leaving them unable to properly appreciate their present and future. He suggests a number of measures to increase historical awareness, including implementing national teaching standards.

Upon release, the book was a national bestseller in Canada. It received positive reviews from the press, but was negatively received by most historians, leading to major debates in Canadian history journals. While many historians agreed with Granatstein's contention that Canadians are ignorant of their past, they disputed the book's argument that the blame lay with social historians and multiculturalism. Several criticized the book as poorly written and unfocused in its argumentation. Following its publication, the provinces Alberta and Manitoba implemented new history curricula emphasizing Canadian content; Historica Canada was founded, an organization whose stated goal is increasing awareness of Canadian history; and Granatstein was appointed director and CEO of the Canadian War Museum. Granatstein released an extensively revised and updated version of the book in 2007, though it received little attention compared to the original version.

== Background ==
=== Author ===
J. L. Granatstein is a Canadian historian and former professor. While serving in the Canadian Army, he received a BA from the Royal Military College of Canada and an MA from the University of Toronto. After receiving a PhD in 1966 from Duke University, he taught history at York University until his retirement in 1995. Stephen Azzi of Carleton University describes Granatstein as the "most prolific Canadian historian of his generation", and Peter Farrugia of Wilfrid Laurier University calls him "one of Canada's best known historians". In the 1970s and 80s, Granatstein's writing focused primarily on the Canadian government during the Second World War – especially Prime Minister William Lyon Mackenzie King – before pivoting to military history in the 1990s.

Historian Leon Fink writes that, besides his history writing, Granatstein is best known for "his stinging neoconservative critique" of Canadian post-secondary institutions – especially tenure, journal subsidies, multiculturalism and political correctness. Granatstein wrote polemics against Canadian universities with his fellow historians David Bercuson and Robert Bothwell, published as The Great Brain Robbery: The Decline of Canada's Universities (1984) and Petrified Campus: The Crisis in Canada's Universities (1997). In his 1990 book on the breakdown of the Meech Lake Accord, journalist Andrew Cohen argues that Granatstein, alongside other contemporary historians Michael Bliss and Ramsay Cook, was among those who instigated public opposition to the eventually failed constitutional deal, writing that the historians "brought their sense of the country's past to the accord and declared it a tearing of the national fabric."

=== History wars ===
Disputes between Canadian historians, dubbed the "history wars", marked the 1980s and 1990s. Historian Cecilia Morgan writes that historians were increasingly "[working] within the structures (some might say strictures) of the academy and their departments", causing "considerable anxiety" for others in the field. Historian Christopher Dummitt classifies the two groups as the older generation, made up of "nationalists" who focus on studying historical leaders, and the younger generation of "inclusivists", approaching the field differently to study the stories of those generally passed over in previous research. Historian Adam Chipnick describes Granatstein as occupying the former group, and sees the book Who Killed Canadian History? as marking "the pinnacle (or the nadir) of ... the 'history wars'."

Really, who cares about the history of [a] housemaid's knee in Belleville in the 1890s?

— J. L. Granatstein's infamous dismissal of social history, 1991 (Note: Granatstein 1998, p. 73: "I did say that, and I have been denounced for it ever since.")

Historian Graham Carr describes the book as fitting into a larger tradition of historiography books written since the 1960s, each of which lament a decline in the popular appreciation of history. (Note: Carr specifically mentions the following: Plumb 1970, Giroux 1981, Bliss 1991–1992, Windschuttle 1997 and Fukuyama 1992.) Historian Robert Wright and journalist Andrew Cohen argue that the book advances points made by Michael Bliss in a 1991 Creighton Centennial Lecture, which Bliss later published in a Journal of Canadian Studies piece titled "Privatizing the Mind: The Sundering of Canadian History, the Sundering of Canada." Bliss's piece argues that, beginning in the 1970s, Canadian history-writing shifted from professional historians to "Via Rail nationalists" who "identified Canada and things Canadian with ... the age of big government, universal social welfare programs, and subsidized culture." Granatstein had previously contributed to the dispute by criticizing what he saw as the increasingly narrow focus of social historians, referring to their study as "the history of [a] housemaid's knee in Belleville in the 1890s". (Note: Moore 1991, p. 59, quoted in Granatstein 1998, pp. 72–73.) Journalist Ray Conlogue writes the statement "hit a nerve", and historian Ken Osborne writes the dismissal "sent the historical establishment, not to mention ministries of education from coast to coast, to the battlements in self-defence." Having been consistently condemned for the assertion, Granatstein later reflected, "[i]t was an overstatement ... but it reflected my increasing uneasiness and complete frustration at the way our history is taught."

The book also coincided with increased fears regarding Canadian unity, coming three years after a near secessionist victory in the 1995 Quebec independence referendum. Historian Chris Lorenz writes that for both Granatstein and Bliss, the Quebec sovereignty movement is "only the most visible symptom" of Canada's fragmentary society and that further societal division is likely if Canada cannot attain a central national identity. For professor Phil Ryan, Who Killed Canadian History? is one of three major Canadian books in the pre-September 11, 2001 era which disparage multiculturalism, the others being sociologist Reginald Bibby's Mosaic Madness: Pluralism Without a Cause (1990) and Richard Gwyn's Nationalism Without Walls: The Unbearable Lightness of Being Canadian (1995).

== Content ==
The nation is fragile indeed and one reason for this lamentable state of affairs might well be a lack of history that binds Canadians together. It is not that we do not have such a history. It is simply that we have chosen not to remember it. (Note: Granatstein 1998, p. xvii, quoted in Reid 2012, p. 242 and Ryan 2010, p. 40.)

— J. L. Granatstein, Who Killed Canadian History?

HarperCollins first published the book in 1998. In 2007, Granatstein released an extensively revised and updated version, published in paperback by Harper Perennial. Granatstein writes that the study and teaching of Canadian history has gradually degraded since the 1960s, and that this degradation is due to several factors, including "parochial regionalism", multiculturalism, "anti-élitist" methods of education and "victimization and blame seeking" in analysis of the past by both academics and the media. (Note: Granatstein 1998, pp. 17, 64, 76, 140, quoted in Carr 1998, p. 167.) It describes Canadian unity as weak, arguing that Canadians lack the uniformity seen in other countries due their lack of a historical narrative. Canadian history, Granatstein writes, merits study and would provide a basis for unity among Canadians, both natural born and immigrants. (Note: Granatstein 2007, p. xvii.) Finding a lack of national standardization in history curricula, he disapproves of the fact that only four provinces have compulsory history courses for students. Canada's refusal to teach its own history, he continues, is due to fear of engaging in "its own cultural traditions – the European civilization on which our nation is founded – on the grounds that to do otherwise would systematically discriminate against those who come from other cultures." (Note: Granatstein 1998, p. xiv; Granatstein 2007, p. xii.)

Granatstein writes that while most in academia can "study whatever they choose without fear of losing their [job]", there is a struggle for control in Canadian history departments. The struggle, he writes, takes place between political historians – those who emphasize narrative, chronology and personality – and social historians – those who have little interest in political, military or "élite" history, but instead use its study for their own political purposes. As an example, he discusses a popular two-volume university textbook, the History of the Canadian Peoples, whose second volume was written by historians Margaret Conrad, Alvin Finkel and Veronica Strong-Boag. The textbook's preface states that they wrote it to counter the previous history as written by "a small élite of educated white men to be read by others like themselves", (Note: Conrad, Finkel & Strong-Boag 1993, p. xv, quoted in Granatstein 1998, p. 57.) with the textbook focusing not on war and political developments or history from the perspective of leaders, but instead the working class, minorities and regions outside of Central Canada. Granatstein laments that such methods of study have resulted in university history departments that lack experts in military and political history, while the remaining professors are ultimately "teaching ignorance" and "professing trivia" of "the blandest mush". (Note: Granatstein 1998, pp. 19, 41, 51, quoted in Carr 1998, p. 167.) The trend of new historians studying "tiny, trivial subjects" via "methodological nonsense" (Note: Granatstein 1998, pp. 46, 76, quoted in Carr 1998, p. 167.) has produced graduates who "emerge into the market place culturally illiterate, ignorant of the basic details about their nation and their society that every thinking citizen requires."

The book compares Canada's situation to that of the United States and the Netherlands. Comparing the United States' idea of a cultural "melting pot" against Canada's "mosaic", he refers to American intellectuals Robert Hughes, Arthur M. Schlesinger Jr. and Richard Rorty as discussing the downsides of multiculturalism, (Note: Granatstein 1998, pp. 89–92, quoted in Lorenz 1999, p. 26.) especially as espoused in Schlesinger's The Disuniting of America (1991), Hughes' Culture of Complaint: The Fraying of America (1993) and a 1994 piece Rorty wrote for The New York Times. (Note: Refer to Schlesinger 1991, Hughes 1993 and Rorty 1994.) Regarding the Netherlands, Granatstein comments that Dutch schools have heavily emphasized Canada's contribution in liberating the Netherlands from Nazi Germany: "The Dutch remember. They teach their children about the war in their schools; they teach that freedom is everything and that, if not defended, it can be lost." (Note: Granatstein 1998, p. 114, quoted in Lorenz 1999, pp. 26–27.) Canadians by contrast, he writes, have largely forgotten about this and other historical events, such as D-Day and the Battle of Vimy Ridge, leaving them unappreciative of their past and present. (Note: Granatstein 1998, pp. 88, 114, 132, quoted in Lorenz 1999, pp. 27, 27n6, 27n7.)

The book concludes that preventing the "decimation of [Canadian] history" and "resurrecting" the past are key to improving Canadian unity. (Note: Granatstein 1998, pp. 137, 139, quoted in Carr 1998, p. 168) To combat the concerns expressed, it offers solutions of national history standards, the institution of a "Canadian History Day", creating five "national history" chairs in Canadian Universities, a Centre for Canadian History, federally funded scholarships and the expansion of resources for libraries and history teachers.

== Reception ==
The book was a bestseller in Canada, selling around twenty thousand copies. In the first week of April 1998, it entered Maclean's magazine's list of best-selling non-fiction at No. 7, reaching No. 2 in July. It received positive reviews from the press, yet received generally negative reviews from professional historians. (Note: Historians Christopher Dummitt and Michael Dawson write that "[e]ditorial opinion and media coverage were largely supportive of Granatstein's arguments", describing Frum 1998, Urquart 1998 and Reaney 1999 as representative examples of the larger coverage.) Its publication resulted in an outburst of debate among historians and educators regarding history education in Canada, many responses being written in Canadian history journals like the Canadian Historical Review. Though some of Granatstein's colleagues reacted positively to the book, including Desmond Morton, Bercuson and Bothwell, social historians were strident in their criticisms.

In a 1999 piece for the Canadian Historical Review, social historian A. B. McKillop summarizes most critiques of the book, writing that it presents only a partial understanding of what defines the Canadian identity. In particular, people need to be "made conscious of all aspects of their shared past", necessitating an "understanding of what it means to be weak as well as powerful". He continues that Canadian historians have not established a new Canadian history since to do so would necessitate "a fundamental rethinking of the meaning and shape of the very idea of nation at a time when, throughout the world, nations and their identities are in flux", ultimately concluding it is unlikely any contemporary historian will manage to "[address] problems of collective identity". Not all historians have agreed with McKillop's assessment, such as Timothy Stanley, who criticizes both Granatstein and McKillop for "[assuming] that all Canadians have a 'shared past'". He writes that Canadians are divided by racism, with some privileged and others oppressed by it, and that the idea of a shared past arises from an inadequate accounting of this difference of experience. He continues that, though McKillop is more "textured and inclusive" than Granatstein, he still narrows the study of history to "nationalist purposes". Stanley agrees with concerns laid out by Bryan Palmer, who writes that McKillop reduces the study of history to the civic necessities of a nation. By contrast, social historian Adele Perry writes that Granatstein's attacks on social history "could not fault historians with abandoning their mission to the nation", but instead "made the blander argument that social historians' work failed to serve the nation well."

Fink, Strong-Boag and Carr are critical of the book's writing style, describing it as poorly written and unfocused, veering into diatribes beyond its original premise. Perry characterizes Granatstein's attacks on social history as "over-engaged and intemperate". Lorenz and historian Deborah Gorham describe it as uneven in its studies of Canadian historiography, suggesting that historian Carl Berger provides a more balanced take on the subject. (Note: In particular, Deborah Gorham and Lorenz mention Berger's book The Writing of Canadian History, especially Berger 1986, pp. 259–320. Lorenz also mentions Ramsay Cook as providing a "far better argued view" regarding the problems of Canadian nationality in his book Canada, Quebec, and the Uses of Nationalism, particularly Cook 1995, pp. 85–98, 159–196 and 237–247.) Though many historians agree with Granatstein's original premise that Canadians are generally ignorant of their country's history, they dispute the reasons why. Fink, Strong-Boag and historians Brian Gobbett and Alan Gordon write political correctness and multiculturalism are relatively recent phenomena when compared to Canada's lack of a national identity; Strong-Boag further contends that there are accounts of "bored audiences" dating as far back as Confederation. Wright suggests that Canadian's lack of interest in history is more fundamental than the poor teaching standards Granatstein mentions, with history "largely irrelevant to the lives of ordinary Canadians." He continues, "if history provided [Canadians] the social, cultural, economic, and political architecture within which they contextualized their lived experience", then school curricula "would be the robust and exciting program that Granatstein imagines it ought to be."

In her study of Louis Riel historiography, historian Jennifer Reid agrees with the book's sentiment that Canadians regret their lack of cultural heroes, but questions why Granatstein opposes the celebration of Riel. Granatstein describes Riel as a "crazed religious fanatic" and argues that not all Canadians could agree on whether his actions were heroic. (Note: Granatstein 1998, pp. xiii, xvi, quoted in Reid 2012, p. 93.) According to historian George Goulet, by Granatstein's standard no historical figure could ever be fit to be a Canadian hero. Reid is further critical of the book's position that Canadian historians overemphasize the country's history of violence and that it is "benign" when compared to other countries that have "overcome" their histories. (Note: Granatstein 1998, pp. xiv, 3–5, 139, quoted in Reid 2012, p. 93.) (Note: In particular, Granatstein mentions Germany, Japan and Russia as having "overcome" their violent histories.) She writes that Granatstein's perspective of a "benign" history is due to his removing the stories of those who have experienced violence from the country's historical narrative, especially its Indigenous population. In his study of Jacques Cartier historiography, Gordon writes that the 20th-century shift from embracing historical heroes to the "trivial and empty idols of Hollywood and hockey" is not due to political correctness and multiculturalism in Canada, but is instead part of a larger worldwide shift in the historical method and "meaning" of history. Historians, he writes, need to understand the inherently political nature of their field, and to reassess their discipline's limited role in shaping the "common sense knowledge", concluding that attempts to "rebuild a lost national identity" by celebrating historical figures like John A. Macdonald will ultimately prove fruitless. Fink concludes that none of Granatstein's proposed solutions will avoid the ultimate problem of "boring Canadian history pedagogy", and Strong-Boag writes that the initiatives proposed are insufficient without historians that provide "faithful accounts of the past".

== Legacy ==
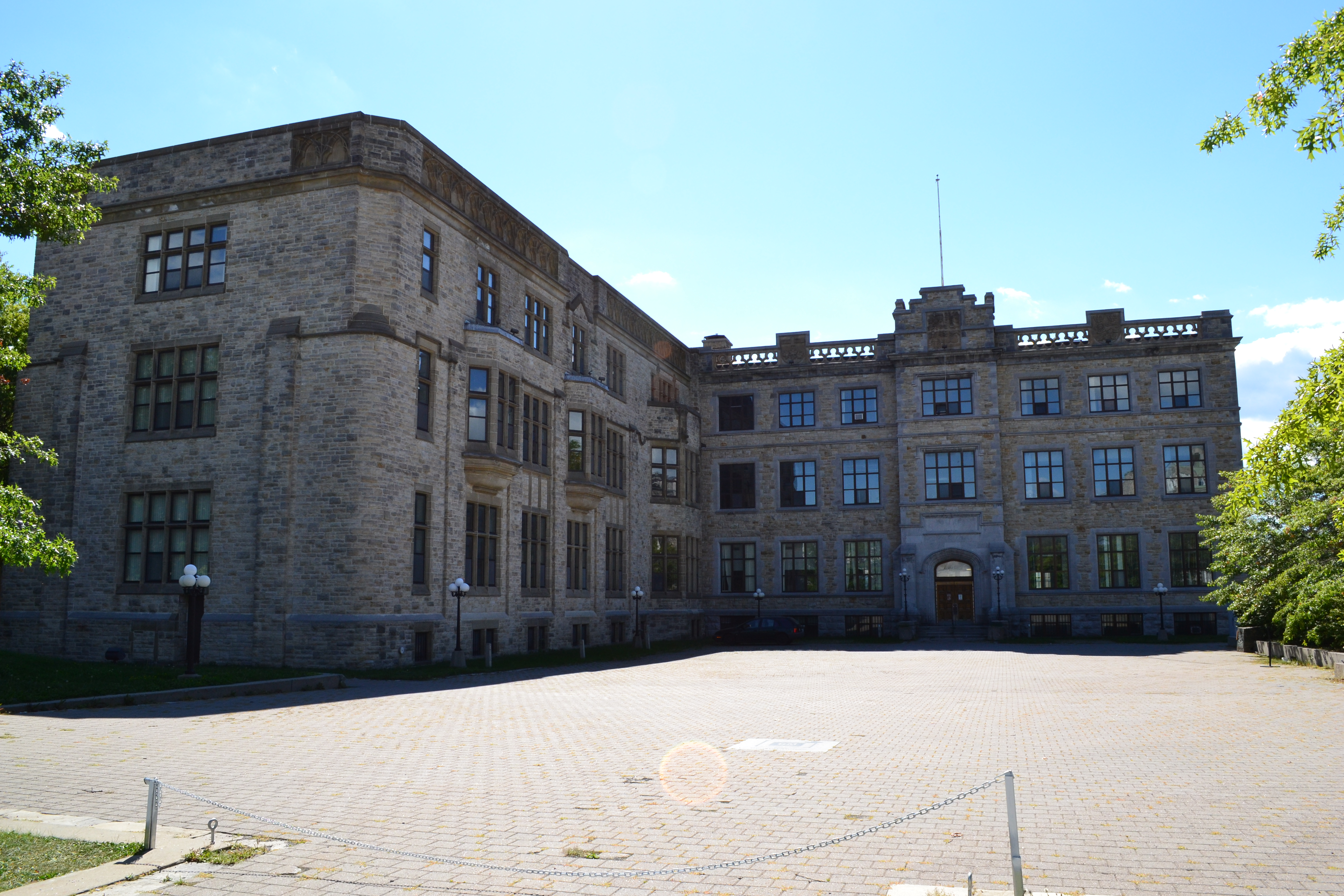
In the year after the book's publication, Granatstein was appointed director and CEO of Ottawa's Canadian War Museum (pictured).

Azzi writes that despite the negative reception from historians, the book improved the general public's knowledge of Canadian history. Following its publication, the provinces Alberta and Manitoba implemented new and expanded history curricula covering more Canadian content; Alberta included more information for elementary school students on pre- and post-Confederation history, as well as high school courses covering Canadian military history, while Manitoba made Canadian history a large focus of grades four through seven. (Note: Granatstein 2007, pp. xiii–xiv, 28–29.) Granatstein laments in the preface to the revised 2007 edition that "most [provinces] did nothing". (Note: Granatstein 2007, p. xiii.)

The book inspired Lynton Wilson, then a chair at the telecommunications firm BCE Inc., to promote Canadian history. (Note: Granatstein 2007, pp. xiv, 167.) He and fellow executive Charles Bronfman made large contributions to start Historica Canada, an organization whose stated goal is increasing awareness of Canadian history. In 1998, Granatstein was appointed director and CEO of the Canadian War Museum, serving in the position from 1 July 1998 to 30 June 2000. (Note: Granatstein 2007, p. xiv.) In 2000, the Canadian government provided $134 million (equivalent to CAD$230 million in 2025) for the building of a new museum building, (Note: Granatstein 2007, pp. xvi–xvii.) Granatstein playing a major role in its creation.

Ken Osborne writes that while it set off major debates among Canadian academics when first published in 1998, the revised and republished edition of the book from 2007 attracted comparatively little attention in the public, press or academia, concluding that, "[f]or the time being ... the history wars seem to be over." Reflecting in 2014, historian Gregory Kealey writes that the book's "jeremiad for a lost, mythical world of manly men in politics and war, ended in an easy victory for social and cultural history." Dummitt agrees, writing that the "inclusivists" have won out over the "nationalists", mostly due to retirements among the latter. Despite this victory, he writes that the "inclusivists" have still failed to reach a popular audience. He finds the homogeneity in thought among contemporary historians regrettable for the field due to the resulting lack of historical debate.

== See also ==
- Who Killed the Canadian Military?, a 2004 book by Granatstein

== Bibliography ==
=== Books ===
- Berger, Carl (1986). The Writing of Canadian History: Aspects of English-Canadian Historical Writing since 1900 (2nd ed.). Toronto: University of Toronto Press. ISBN 0-8020-2546-3.
- Cohen, Andrew (1990). A Deal Undone: The Making and Breaking of the Meech Lake Accord. Vancouver: Douglas & McIntyre. ISBN 0-88894-704-6.
- Cohen, Andrew (2008). The Unfinished Canadian: The People We Are. Toronto: McClelland & Stewart. ISBN 978-1-55199-270-9.
- Conrad, Margaret; Finkel, Alvin; Strong-Boag, Veronica (1993). History of the Canadian Peoples. Vol. 2 (First ed.). Toronto: Copp Clark Pitman. ISBN 0-7730-4843-X.
- Cook, Ramsay (1995). Canada, Quebec, and the Uses of Nationalism (2nd ed.). Toronto: McClelland & Stewart. ISBN 0-7710-2254-9.
- Fukuyama, Francis (1992). The End of History and the Last Man. New York: Free Press. ISBN 0-02-910975-2.
- Gordon, Alan (2010). The Hero and the Historians: Historiography and the Uses of Jacques Cartier. Vancouver: UBC Press. ISBN 978-0-7748-1743-1.
- Goulet, George R. D. (1999). The Trial of Louis Riel: Justice and Mercy Denied: A Critical Legal and Political Analysis. Calgary: Tellwell Publishing. ISBN 0-9685489-0-3.
- Granatstein, J. L. (1998). Who Killed Canadian History?. Toronto: HarperCollins. ISBN 0-00-255759-2.
- Granatstein, J. L. (2007). Who Killed Canadian History? (Revised ed.). Toronto: Harper Perennial. ISBN 978-0-00-200895-2.
- Hughes, Robert (1993). Culture of Complaint: The Fraying of America. Oxford: Oxford University Press. ISBN 0-19-507676-1.
- Kealey, Gregory S. (1995). Workers and Canadian History. Montreal and Kingston: McGill–Queen's University Press. ISBN 0-7735-1355-8.
- Levesque, Stephane; Croteau, Jean-Philippe (2020). Beyond History for Historical Consciousness: Students, Narrative, and Memory. Toronto: University of Toronto Press. ISBN 978-1-4875-3479-0.
- Morgan, Cecilia (2016). Commemorating Canada: History, Heritage, and Memory, 1850s–1990s. Toronto: University of Toronto Press. ISBN 978-1-4426-1061-3.
- Plumb, J. H. (1970). The Death of the Past. Boston: Houghton Mifflin. ISBN 0-395-08103-3.
- Reid, Jennifer (2012). Louis Riel and the Creation of Modern Canada: Mythic Discourse and the Postcolonial State. Winnipeg: University of Manitoba Press. ISBN 978-0-88755-734-7.
- Ryan, Phil (2010). Multicultiphobia. Toronto: University of Toronto Press. ISBN 978-1-4426-1068-2.
- Schlesinger, Arthur M. Jr. (1991). The Disuniting of America: Reflections on a Multicultural Society. Knoxville: Whittle Direct Books. ISBN 1-879736-00-4.
- Windschuttle, Keith (1997). The Killing of History: How Literary Critics and Social Theorists are Murdering our Past. New York: Free Press. ISBN 0-684-84445-1.

=== Book chapters ===
- Dummitt, Christopher; Dawson, Michael (2009). "Introduction: Debating the Future of Canadian History: Preliminary Answers to Uncommon Questions". In Dummitt, Christopher; Dawson, Michael (eds.). Contesting Clio's Craft: New Directions and Debates in Canadian History. London: Institute for the Study of the Americas. pp. x–xix. ISBN 978-1-900039-88-8.
- Dummitt, Christopher (2009). "After Inclusiveness: The Future of Canadian History". In Dummitt, Christopher; Dawson, Michael (eds.). Contesting Clio's Craft: New Directions and Debates in Canadian History. London: Institute for the Study of the Americas. pp. 98–122. ISBN 978-1-900039-88-8.
- Farrugia, Peter (2005). "Introduction: Navigating the River of History". In Farrugia, Peter (ed.). The River of History: Trans-national and Trans-disciplinary Perspectives on the Immanence of the Past. Calgary: University of Calgary Press. pp. 1–31. ISBN 1-55238-160-9.
- Giroux, Henry A. (1981). "Schooling and the Culture of Positivism: Notes on the Death of History". Ideology, Culture, and the Process of Schooling. Philadelphia: Temple University Press. pp. 37–62. ISBN 0-905273-19-2.
- Osborne, Ken (2011). "Teaching Canadian History: A Century of Debate". In Clark, Penny (ed.). New Possibilities for the Past: Shaping History Education in Canada. Vancouver: UBC Press. pp. 55–80. ISBN 978-0-7748-2061-5.
- Perry, Adele (2009). "Nation, Empire and the Writing of History in Canada in English". In Dummitt, Christopher; Dawson, Michael (eds.). Contesting Clio's Craft: New Directions and Debates in Canadian History. London: Institute for the Study of the Americas. pp. 123–140. ISBN 978-1-900039-88-8.

=== Journal articles ===
- Bliss, Michael (Winter 1991–1992). "Privatizing the Mind: The Sundering of Canadian History, the Sundering of Canada". Journal of Canadian Studies. 26 (4): 5–17. doi:10.3138/jcs.26.4.5. ISSN 0021-9495. S2CID 151721939.
- Carr, Graham (Spring–Summer 1998). "Review Essay: Harsh Sentences: Appealing the Strange Verdict of Who Killed Canadian History?". American Review of Canadian Studies. 28 (1–2): 167–176. doi:10.1080/02722019809481568. ISSN 0272-2011.
- Chapnick, Adam (Summer 2010). "Where have all of Canada's diplomatic historians gone?". International Journal. 65 (3): 725–737. doi:10.1177/002070201006500312. ISSN 0020-7020. JSTOR 25762027. S2CID 144704573.
- Fink, Leon (Spring 1999). "Losing the Hearts and Minds, or How Clio Disappeared from Canadian Public Schools". Labour/Le Travail. 43: 211–215. doi:10.2307/25148945. ISSN 0700-3862. JSTOR 25148945.
- Gobbett, Brian (February 1999). "Review of Who Killed Canadian History?". The History Teacher. 32 (2): 314–315. doi:10.2307/494460. ISSN 0018-2745. JSTOR 494460.
- Gorham, Deborah (Spring 1999). "From Bonavista to Vancouver Island: Canadian Women's History as Regional History in the 1990s". Acadiensis. 28 (2): 119–125. ISSN 0044-5851. JSTOR 30302821.
- Kealey, Gregory S. (Spring 2014). "Harper and Non-History". Labour/Le Travail. 73: 213–214. ISSN 0700-3862. JSTOR 24244257.
- Lorenz, Chris (February 1999). "Comparative Historiography: Problems and Perspectives". History and Theory. 38 (1): 25–39. doi:10.1111/0018-2656.741999074. ISSN 0018-2656. JSTOR 2505314.
- McKillop, A. B. (June 1999). "Who Killed Canadian History? A View from the Trenches". Canadian Historical Review. 80 (2): 269–300. doi:10.3138/CHR.80.2.269. ISSN 1710-1093. S2CID 154914189.
- Osborne, Ken (March 1999). "Who Killed Canadian History? by J.L. Ghanatstein [sic] (review)". Canadian Historical Review. 80 (1): 114–118. ISSN 1710-1093.
- Palmer, Bryan D. (December 1999). "Of Silences and Trenches: A Dissident View of Granatstein's Meaning". Canadian Historical Review. 80 (4): 676–686. ISSN 1710-1093.
- Stanley, Timothy J. (May 2000). "Why I Killed Canadian History: Conditions for an Anti-Racist History in Canada". Histoire sociale/Social History. 33 (65): 79–103. ISSN 1918-6576.
- Strong-Boag, Veronica (1999). "Review of J. L. Granatstein's Who Killed Canadian History?". Historical Studies in Education/Revue d'histoire de l'éducation. 11 (2): 283–305. doi:10.32316/hse/rhe.v11i2.1625. ISSN 0843-5057.
- Wright, Robert (December 2000). "Historical Underdosing: Pop Demography and the Crisis in Canadian History" (PDF). Canadian Historical Review. 81 (4): 646–667. ISSN 1710-1093.

=== Magazine and newspaper articles ===
- Alphonso, Caroline (5 November 2008). "McMaster chancellor donating $2.5-million for a centre of Canadian history". The Globe and Mail. Archived from the original on 22 December 2021.
- Anon.[a] (4 April 1998). "Best-sellers". Windsor Star. p. G7 – via Newspapers.com.
- Anon.[b] (25 July 1998). "Best-sellers". Windsor Star. p. H7 – via Newspapers.com.
- Conlogue, Ray (21 September 2000). "The Great War for Our Past". The Globe and Mail. Archived from the original on 8 May 2021.
- Frum, David (25 April 1998). "Lack of history teaching is national suicide". The London Free Press. F4. ISSN 0839-0738.
- Kirchhoff, H. J. (3 November 2007). "Paperbacks". The Globe and Mail. Archived from the original on 7 May 2021.
- Moore, Christopher (April–May 1991). "The Organized Man". The Beaver. Vol. 71, no. 2. pp. 57–60. ISSN 0005-7517.
- Reaney, James (15 April 1999). "Historian-warrior Jack Granatstein battles on". The London Free Press. C1. ISSN 0839-0738.
- Reitz, Jeffrey G. (July–August 2010). "Getting Past "Yes" or "No": A review of Multicultiphobia, by Phil Ryan". Literary Review of Canada. Vol. 18, no. 6. ISSN 1188-7494. Archived from the original on 28 December 2021.
- Rorty, Richard (13 February 1994). "The Unpatriotic Academy". The New York Times. 4.15. Archived from the original on 14 May 2021.
- Urquart, Ian (30 June 1998). "It's time to send history back to school". Toronto Star. A15. ISSN 0319-0781.
