= Paul Cowan =

Paul Cowan may refer to:

- Paul Cowan (journalist), Scottish-Canadian journalist and writer
- Paul Cowan (filmmaker), Canadian filmmaker
- Paul Cowan (writer), American journalist and writer
