= Whose War Is It? =

- First edition cover
- Author: Jack Granatstein (published J.L. Granatstein)
- Cover artist: Corbis
- Language: English
- Subject: Canadian political science
- Publisher: HarperCollins Canada
- Publication date: January 11, 2007
- Publication place: Canada
- Media type: Print
- Pages: 256
- ISBN: 978-0-00-222854-1

Whose War Is It? is a non-fiction book by Jack Granatstein (published J.L. Granatstein), a Canadian historian and military veteran. It critiques several aspects of Canadian politics, foreign policy and national defense, including Canadian involvement in United Nations peacekeeping missions, Canadian national interests, Canada – United States relations, the state of the Canadian Arctic, Quebec pacifism and Canada's policy of multiculturalism.

== Reception ==
The book received mainly positive reviews throughout major Canadian newspapers. The Montreal Gazette described the book as "essential reading for anybody interested in Canada's defence and foreign policy." The Calgary Herald described the book as "a short, sharp, reality slap to Canadians who think terrorists would never attack us given half an opportunity." The Globe and Mail asked the question: "Does Canada need a foreign policy? You bet it does, and [Whose War Is It?] tells us why."

The book, however, has been criticized for its oversimplification of issues by Kim Krenz, a journalist at the Canadian Military Journal.

== See also ==
- Canadian military
- Canadian politics
- Canadian foreign policy
