= Bashow =

Bashow may refer to:

- Bashow, a form of chaperoned quasi-date used by Hasidic Jews
- David Bashow, Canadian writer
- Pavel Bazhov (Pawel Petrowitsch Baschow/Bashow; 1879-1950), Russian writer; some works translated into English
