= Who Killed the Canadian Military? =

2004 non-fiction book

- Book cover of Who Killed the Canadian Military? (first edition)
- Author: J. L. Granatstein
- Language: English
- Subject: Canadian political science
- Publisher: HarperCollins Canada
- Publication date: January 29, 2004
- Publication place: Canada
- Media type: Print
- Pages: 249
- ISBN: 978-0-00-200675-0

Who Killed the Canadian Military? is a 2004 non-fiction book by J. L. Granatstein, a Canadian historian and military veteran. It examines and critiques the dilapidated state of the Canadian military. It also argues that a well-funded and well-trained military is necessary, given the then current international climate, and that increased military spending is necessary for Canada to survive as a nation. The book received mainly positive reviews from both the Canadian Military Journal and H-Net.

== See also ==
- Who Killed Canadian History?, 1998 book by Granatstein
- Canadian military
- Canadian politics
- Canadian foreign policy
