= Andrew Richter =

Canadian political scientist

Andrew Richter is a Canadian political scientist who is an assistant professor in the department of political science at the University of Windsor in Windsor, Ontario, Canada.

== Education ==
Richter obtained his Ph.D. from York University in 1998, and between 1998 and 2001 was a post-doctoral fellow at the Institute of International Relations at the University of British Columbia.

== Biography ==
His primary areas of research are Canadian foreign and defense policy, nuclear proliferation and the impact of advanced technology on the use of force. He teaches and lectures widely in the field of strategic studies.

In 2002, he published Avoiding Armageddon: Canadian Military Strategy and Nuclear Weapons, 1950-1963. He has also published in a wide array of journals, including International Journal, Comparative Strategy and Naval War College Review.

== Awards ==
In fall 2007, Richter received the Fulbright Visiting Research Chair in Canada-U.S. Relations at the Woodrow Wilson International Center for Scholars Washington, DC. He has also received the Social Sciences and Humanities Research Council of Canada (SSHRC) Research Grant, 2006–2009.

== Publications ==
- "Forty Years of Neglect, Indifference, and Apathy: The Relentless Decline of Canada's Armed Forces", in Handbook of Canadian Foreign Policy, edited by Patrick James, Nelson Michaud, and Mark O'Reilly, Toronto: Lexington Books, 2006. ISBN 0-7391-0694-5
- "Towards a More Strategic Future? An Examination of the Canadian Government's Recent Defence Policy Statements", Canadian Military Journal, vol. 7, no. 1 (Spring 2006).
- "From Trusted Ally to Suspicious Neighbour: Canada-US Relations in a Changing Global Environment", The American Review of Canadian Studies, vol. 35, no. 3 (Autumn 2005).
- "A Question of Defence: How American Allies are Responding to the US Missile Defence Program", Comparative Strategy, vol. 23, no. 2 (April–June 2004).
- "Alongside the Best? The Future of the Canadian Forces", Naval War College Review, vol. 56, no. 1 (Winter 2003).
- Avoiding Armageddon: Canadian Military Strategy and Nuclear Weapons, 1950-1963, Vancouver: UBC Press and Michigan State University Press, 2002. ISBN 0-7748-0888-8
