= Andrew Cohen (journalist) =

Canadian journalist and author

Andrew Zebulon Cohen
- Born: 1955; Montreal, Quebec, Canada
- Occupation(s): Journalist, author, professor

Andrew Zebulon Cohen (born 1955) is a Canadian journalist, author, and professor of journalism at Carleton University's School of Journalism and Norman Paterson School of International Affairs. Cohen has written widely on international affairs and on Canadian politics. His books include A Deal Undone: The Making and Breaking of the Meech Lake Accord and Trudeau's Shadow: The Life and Legacy of Pierre Elliott Trudeau.

Cohen was born in Montreal, Quebec. He studied political science at McGill University, then took graduate degrees in journalism and international relations at Carleton University in Ottawa, Ontario. From 1991 to 1993, he was a visiting fellow at the University of Cambridge. He also spent a year at the German Institute for International and Security Affairs in Berlin.

He has worked as a journalist for the Ottawa Citizen, United Press International, Time, the Financial Post, Saturday Night, and The Globe and Mail. At the Globe and Mail, he was a member of the editorial board and a columnist and foreign correspondent in Washington, D.C. Cohen has won two Canadian National Newspaper Awards, three National Magazine Awards, and the Queen's Golden Jubilee Medal.

He has written and co-edited six books, among them The Unfinished Canadian: The People We Are, and While Canada Slept: How We Lost Our Place in the World, which was a national bestseller and a finalist for the Governor General's Literary Award for Non-Fiction. His other publications include the entry in the Extraordinary Canadians series on former Prime Minister Lester B. Pearson and Lost Beneath the Ice: The Story of HMS Investigator.

Cohen lives in Ottawa with his wife, Mary, and their two children, Rachel and Alexander.

== Partial bibliography ==
- Trudeau's Shadow: The Life and Legacy of Pierre Elliott Trudeau, with J. L. Granatstein (Vintage Canada, 1999, ISBN 0679310061)
- While Canada Slept: How We Lost Our Place in the World (2003, ISBN 0771022751)
- The Unfinished Canadian: The People We Are (McClelland & Stewart, 2007, ISBN 978-0771021817)
- Extraordinary Canadians: Lester B. Pearson written with John Ralston Saul (Penguin Canada, 2008 ISBN 978-0670067381)
- Lost Beneath the Ice: The Story of HMS Investigator (Dundurn, 2013, ISBN 978-1459719491)
- Two Days in June: John F. Kennedy and the 48 Hours that Made History (2014, ISBN 0771023871)
