= Doug Owram =

Doug Owram is professor of history and was deputy vice-chancellor of the University of British Columbia Okanagan from 2006 to 2012, a post he assumed on July 1, 2006. He was formerly vice president (academic) and provost at the University of Alberta.

== Education ==
Owram earned a Bachelor of Arts degree (first class with honours) in history and economics from Queen's University at Kingston in 1970, going on to complete his master's degree in history at Queen's in 1972. In 1976 Owram received his PhD in history from the University of Toronto and subsequently joined the faculty at the University of Alberta in the Department of History (1976–2006).

== Career ==
During his time at the University of Alberta he served as associate dean of arts, associate dean of graduate studies, acted as department chair and was appointed associate vice-president (academic) in 1994. In 1995 he was appointed vice-president (academic) and in 1998 the title of provost was added, making him the chief operating officer of the university. He completed his term as provost and vice-president (academic) in 2003.

In addition, Owram served in many capacities outside the university. Chief among these was his tenure as president of the Canadian Federation of Humanities and Social Sciences from 2001 to 2003, as chair of the Campus Alberta Quality Council from its inception in 2004 until July 1, 2006, and as a National Historical Association board member since 2004. He has also served as a member of the board of directors of NeWest Press, including a term as vice-president, and on grant committees of SSHRC and the Molson Prize Committee. He also served as a member of the SSHRC steering committee on the future of the humanities. From 2008 to 2011 he served on the council of the Royal Society of Canada and was secretary to Academy II. He is currently a member of the board of the Degree Quality Assessment Board of British Columbia and served as chair of an expert panel of the Council of Canadian Academies on Memory Institutions and the Digital Age.

Owram was the recipient of a University of Alberta McCalla Professorship in 1989, and was elected as a Fellow of the Royal Society of Canada in 1990. He received the J. Gordin Kaplan Award for Research Excellence in 1995.

== Author ==
The author of several books, Owram's more recent titles include Born at the Right Time: A History of the Baby Boom Generation (University of Toronto Press, 1996) and Promise of Eden: the Canadian Expansionist Movement and the Idea of the West 1856-1900 (University of Toronto Press, 1980 and 1992). Recent publications include a piece on Canada for the Oxford History of the British Empire and a paper on NAFTA. In 2013 he wrote an historiographic introduction to a new edition of Carl Berger's The Sense of Power (pp. xi-xviii). (University of Toronto Press, 2013)

=== Promise of Eden ===
Promise of Eden is a 1980 book by Doug Owram, examining the Canadian expansionist movement between the years 1856 and 1900. The book was published by the University of Toronto Press, and was based on work Owram had done for his doctoral dissertation at the University of Toronto.

Owram sets out to study how the idea of the Canadian West evolved in the minds of central Canadians. He traces conceptions of Rupert's Land from a barren wasteland to an area that was ripe for settlement and offered the best, and sometimes only, hope of prosperity and redemption for the Canadian nation. Particular emphasis is given to the Red River Rebellion and its effects on the perception of the West and how indicative it was of burgeoning Western alienation.

The book continues by examining the re-evaluation of the suitability of the region for agriculture and settlement. Also noted is the desire of central Canadian expansionists to foster the emergence of a British moral character on the prairies. Owram elaborates on the problematics associated with settling Palliser's Triangle and the work of John Macoun; an individual whose interpretation of the Triangle caused many hardships for future settlers.

A concluding section of the book further discusses sources of Western alienation and offers a brief discussion of the historiography of Red River Settlement.
