= F. H. Buckley =

Foundation Professor at George Mason University School of Law

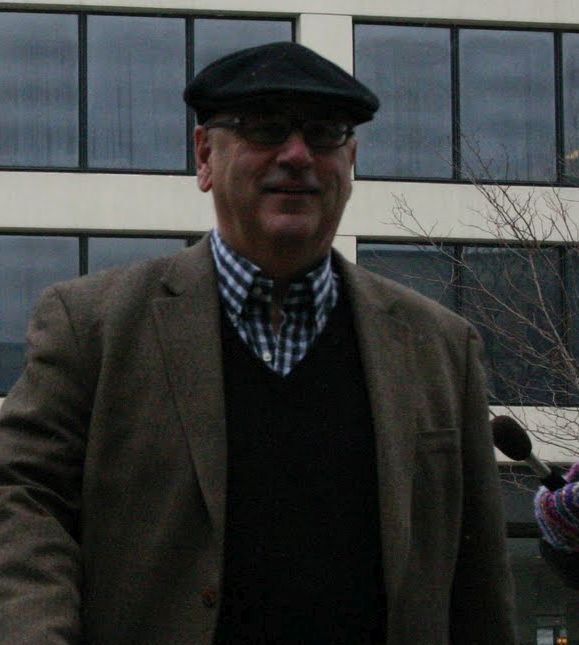
- Buckley at Shimer College in 2010.
- Born: 1948 (age 77–78); Saskatoon, Saskatchewan, Canada
- Education: McGill University; Harvard Law School

Francis "Frank" Herbert Buckley is a foundation professor at George Mason University School of Law where he has taught since 1989. Before then he was a visiting Olin fellow at the University of Chicago Law School. He has also taught at Panthéon-Assas University, Sciences Po in Paris and the McGill Faculty of Law in Montreal. He practiced law for three years in Toronto.

He has written on issues including constitutional government, the rule of law, laughter and contract theory, and the rise of Trump. He is a frequent contributor to The American Spectator and other magazines and newspapers.

== Early life and education ==
Buckley was born in 1948 in Saskatoon, Saskatchewan, Canada. He attended St. Joseph's College, a boarding school in Yorkton, Saskatchewan, from which he graduated in 1965.

Buckley graduated with a B.A. (Hons.) from McGill University in Montreal in 1969. He subsequently studied at the McGill Faculty of Law, where he served as editor in chief of the McGill Law Journal (vol. 20). He received an LL.B. from McGill in 1974, and an LL.M. from Harvard Law School in 1975, with a thesis on shareholder ratification in corporate law.

== Academic career ==
After graduating from Harvard Law School, Buckley worked at a Toronto law firm as an articling student, and from 1976 to 1977 was an assistant professor at the University of Ottawa Faculty of Law. From 1977 to 1982 he was an assistant, then an associate professor at the McGill Faculty of Law. Over 1982 to 1984 he worked as a lawyer in Toronto, and from 1984 to 1989 was an associate professor at the McGill Faculty of Law. Over 1988 and 1989, on leave from McGill, he was a visiting Olin fellow at the University of Chicago Law School.

He joined the George Mason School of Law as a professor in 1989, and subsequently was appointed a foundation professor at George Mason. From 1999 to 2010 he was the executive director of the George Mason Law & Economics Center, which offered educational programs for judges. While at George Mason, he served twice as a visiting fellow and lecturer at the Sorbonne (Paris II), and also once at Sciences Po in Paris.

== Writings and views ==
Buckley has published in the Journal of Legal Studies, the Virginia Law Review, the Cornell Law Journal, the International Review of Law and Economics, the UCLA Law Review, the University of Toronto Law Journal, and many other law reviews.

Buckley is a senior editor of The American Spectator, and has also published in The Wall Street Journal, the National Post, The Dorchester Review, and the New Criterion, and has frequently been a guest on NPR, Fox News, and other talk programs. He has written on a variety of subjects, including bike lanes, the films of John Ford, James Thurber, and Canadian politics.

- Constitutional government: Buckley's The Once and Future King: The Rise of Crown Government in America was published by Encounter Books in April 2014. The book argues that the Framers, at their Convention in Philadelphia in 1787, sought to give America something closer to Congressional (or parliamentary) than presidential government, and that the former is a superior form of government. Buckley argues that America has now moved to a form of strong presidential government.
- Rule of law: Buckley edited The American Illness: Essays on the Rule of Law (Yale U.P., 2013), to which he contributed three chapters. He suggests that "America's lowered rankings among multinational corporation CEOs as a place to do business is due to a hubris that doesn't consider America's inevitable relative decline in a globalized market."
- Laughter: Buckley's The Morality of Laughter (U. Michigan P., 2003), argues for a superiority theory of laughter, in which there is always a butt to our laughter whose faults it seeks to correct. A review in the Wall Street Journal stated that Buckley "is clearly a witty man, and wit, as he shows, redeems a great deal. The Morality of Laughter is a serious contribution to social and moral philosophy masquerading as an entertaining anatomy of an underappreciated human resource."
- Transportation: In 2013 Buckley wrote a column in The Wall Street Journal opposing bike lanes on King Street in Alexandria, Virginia. Despite this, the lanes were approved by a unanimous City Council vote. In 2014, he characterized his neighbors who supported the bike lanes as "Vichyite collaborators". In 2016, he characterized federal funding for bicycle and pedestrian improvements as worse ("the muck goes deeper, however") than government lobbyists.
- Contract theory and free bargaining: Buckley's Fair Governance: Paternalism and Perfectionism was published by Oxford U.P. in 2009. In it he discusses arguments for and against paternalism (restrictions on the legal capacity to bargain) and perfectionism (the enforcement of morals). Buckley's Just Exchange: A Theory of Contract (Routledge, 2005) "fills a prominent hole in the literature, explaining economic terms and jargon with welcome clarity". The Fall and Rise of Freedom of Contract (Duke U.P., 1999), which Buckley edited, describes how free contracting, under attack during much of the 20th century, has revived with the assistance of the law-and-economics movement. "These original papers by some of the most distinguished North American law-and-economics scholars make a strong case for the virtues of contractarianism across a wide spectrum of legal specialties, including contract law, tort law, family law, bankruptcy, and private international law." When teaching in Canada, Buckley co-authored casebooks on Sales and Sales Financing and Corporations: Principles and Policies.
- The rise of Trump: Buckley published The Republican Workers Party: How the Trump Victory Drove Everyone Crazy, and Why It Was Just What We Needed (Encounter Books, 2018). He describes the birth of a new Republican Party. Jonah Goldberg describes the GOP today as no longer driven by ideology but is rather a coalition. This change, from an ideological party to a political coalition is what Buckley explains. He refers to a work created by the Voter Study Group in 2017, "Political Divisions in 2016 and Beyond: Tensions Between and Within the Two Parties", to explain this new coalition.

=== Speeches ===
Buckley and his wife Esther Goldberg wrote candidate Donald Trump's major foreign policy speech delivered at the American Israel Public Affairs Committee (AIPAC) convention on March 21, 2016. He was also a contributing speechwriter to Donald Trump Jr's July 19 address to the 2016 Republican National Convention, and defended Trump against accusations of having misappropriated phrases from Buckley's published work.

== Controversy ==
In May 2022, Buckley came under criticism for a tweet in which he referred to Supreme Court Justice Sonia Sotomayor as a "stupid Latina". He apologized the next day and deleted his twitter account.

== Personal life ==
Buckley lives in Alexandria, Virginia with his wife, Esther Goldberg. They have one daughter.

According to National Review, he is unrelated to conservative author William F. Buckley Jr.

== Publications ==
- (1995) Corporations: Principles and policies
- (2003) The Morality of Laughter
- (2004) Just Exchange: A Theory of Contract (The Economics of Legal Relationships)
- (2009) Fair Governance: Paternalism and Perfectionism
- (2015) The Once and Future King: The Rise of Crown Government in America
- (2017) The Republic of Virtue: How We Tried to Ban Corruption, Failed, and What We Can Do About It
- (2017) The Way Back: Restoring the Promise of America
- (2018) The Republican Workers Party: How the Trump Victory Drove Everyone Crazy, and Why It Was Just What We Needed
- (2020) American Secession: The Looming Threat of a National Breakup
- (2021) Curiosity: And Its Twelve Rules for Life
- (2022) Progressive Conservatism: How Republicans Will Become America's Natural Governing Party
