= Canadian history wars =

Public debate in Canada over residential schools and social history

The Canadian history wars refer to a series of disputes between Canadian historians in the 1980s and 1990s that focused on the legacy of its persecution of First Nations, including Canadian residential schools, as well as the role of social history became known as the history wars. Historian Adam Chipnick describes 1998's Who Killed Canadian History? by J. L. Granatstein as "the pinnacle" of these disputes.
