= Louis Riel and the Creation of Modern Canada =

2008 book by Jennifer Reid

- Author: Jennifer Reid
- Illustrator: Liz Frederic (maps)
- Series: Religions of the Americas
- Subject: Louis Riel
- Genre: History
- Published: November 1, 2008
- Publisher: University of New Mexico Press
- Publication place: United States
- Pages: 326
- ISBN: 978-0826344151
- OCLC: 312463591

Louis Riel and the Creation of Modern Canada: Mythic Discourse and the Postcolonial State is a 2008 book by Canadian historian Jennifer Reid. Focusing on the Métis leader Louis Riel, it explores his legacy as a national hero and the broader concepts of Canadian identity and the Canadian state, as well as how the former is intrinsically connected with the latter. The book received a mixed reception in academic and journalistic circles; despite some positive reviews, critics were divided on the coverage and viability of its arguments and criticized its accuracy and sourcing.

== Contents ==
Louis Riel and the Creation of Modern Canada is a monograph on the Métis leader Louis Riel, exploring both his religious background and his mythological image, as well as the impact of these concepts, as well as collective memory, on the history of Canadian identity. It argues that Canada's nature as a postcolonial multinational confederation explains how Riel is regarded as a national hero despite his marginalized background, a rarity throughout the Americas, and that his status is an example of Canada's issues with nationalism.

The book starts with a chapter on background information revolving around Riel, specifically biographical information and his role in the Red River Rebellion and the North-West Rebellion. The next two chapters explore the broader controversy with national identity in Canada, including what Reid calls a nationwide system of "dichotomies" – "east and west, [the provinces] Quebec and Ontario, Catholic and Protestant, and Native and nonnative" – and such unsuccessful attempts at a single national identity as Anglocentrism and the Canadian Pacific Railway, as well as the idea of whether or not the country can even be considered a nation-state. During them, she reveals the idea of métissage, a multicultural concept she calls "a most basic fact of the Canadian experience" and through which she describes Riel.

In the fourth chapter, Reid argues that the North-West Rebellion was the point when Canada "fully emerge[d] as a modern geopolitical entity", comparing it to the Revolutions of 1848. Later, the book's subject matter is approached in the next two chapters through Riel's religious beliefs and personal writings, The final chapter concludes that Canada's history has been of a postcolonial nature, noting that Riel's "various mythic modalities may well provide a foundation for a coherent discourse about what it means to be Canadian", and describing his idea for the Canadian nation as a "potential alternative to the nation-state".

== Publication ==
Prior to the book's release, the legacy of Louis Riel had been the subject of controversy since his participation in the Red River Rebellion in 1869. Jennifer Reid, who became interested in Riel self-admittedly "probably before [she] could read" and recalled her parents arguing about him during her youth, was inspired to write the book by her doctoral advisor Robert Choquette, as well as by religion historian David Carrasco. In a tie-in interview, Reid said that this book is intended to "explore the complicated nature of identity in modernity in general, with Canada as the entree", as well as to re-examine the idea of the nation state. Reid was assisted in translation by her mother Irene Reid, and the maps were drawn by Liz Frederic.

Louis Riel and the Creation of Modern Canada was released by University of New Mexico Press on November 1, 2008, as part of the publisher's Religions of the Americas series. Despite the book's Canadian subject matter, its first edition was released by an American publisher after Reid was unable to find a Canadian publisher for the book. It was finally given a Canadian edition by the University of Manitoba Press on February 20, 2012, Louis Riel Day; Glenn Bergen, the press's managing editor, explained that this was due to the work's nature as "a Manitoban story" (Riel was from present-day Manitoba).

== Reception ==
Sheila McManus and Diane Payment called the book "thought-provoking" and a "powerful narrative", respectively, and the former said it inspired her to consider centering her Canadian studies education on métissage. Beth LaDow called its exploration of Riel's status "provocative and broadly synthetic", and she and Colin Coates commended its approach towards Canadian identity. Kevin Bruyneel and Andrew Nurse praised the book's stable nature within the academic studies of Riel and exploration of Canada's geopolitical evolution, and Coates and Payment both drew comparisons with John Ralston Saul's similarly themed A Fair Country. Christopher Vecsey at Choice ranked it as "Highly recommended". Christine McFarlane of Windspeaker called it "a great read for those with an interest in history" but criticized its inaccessibility for mainstream audiences.

Nurse and William Westfall voiced their skepticism on Reid's views of Canada and Riel, with the former associating Stephen Harper's government with cultural homogenization and deeming Reid's use of metaphysics incompatible with political science, and the latter noting that not every dichotomy had an association with Riel and that his relationship with Canadian expansionism was left ambiguous. Albert Braz criticized the shortage of coverage of Canadian and Métis political similarities and Riel's volition towards national hero status, while Coates and MacManus, respectively, found the religious themes insufficiently developed and said that the book had no clear, separate introduction for its arguments. Braz also criticized the excessive use of secondary sources or writings of Riel from his later life, and MacManus and Payment raised similar concerns about the insufficiently sourced claim that Riel's rebellions were "the subject of more books than any other in Canadian history" and factual errors such as his Chipewyan grandmother being Chippewa. Braz and Westfall also noted the misuse of sic on Canadian English spellings and of modernist phrases, respectively.
