= Jennifer Reid =

Canadian-American historian

- Occupation: Historian
- Awards: Guggenheim Fellowship (2015)

Academic background
- Education: University College of Cape Breton; University of Ottawa
- Thesis: No Man's Land: British and Mi'kmaq in 18th and 19th Century Acadia (1994)
- Doctoral advisor: Robert Choquette

Academic work
- Discipline: First Nations history
- Institutions: University of Maine at Farmington
- Main interests: History of Mi'kmaq religion; Louis Riel

Jennifer Reid is a Canadian-American historian whose research focuses on the relationship of religion with colonialization or globalization, as well as methodology in religious studies. A 2015 Guggenheim Fellow, she is the author of Myth, Symbol, and Colonial Encounter (1995), Louis Riel and the Creation of Modern Canada (2008), and Finding Kluskap (2013). She was a professor at University of Maine at Farmington.

== Biography ==
Jennifer Reid was born to parents of differing religious and language backgrounds – English-speaking Protestant William and French-speaking Catholic Irene – and raised in Arnprior, a suburb within the Ottawa–Gatineau region. She obtained her BA (1990) at University College of Cape Breton (UCCB), as well as her MA (1992) and PhD (1994) at the University of Ottawa; her doctoral dissertation No Man's Land: British and Mi'kmaq in 18th and 19th Century Acadia was supervised by Robert Choquette. She joined the faculty of the University of Maine at Farmington in the mid-1990s, eventually becoming professor there. She worked for the Niwano Peace Foundation as a researcher in 2015.

Reid, who became interested in First Nations culture after befriending several Mi'kmaq students during her time at UCCB, specializes in the relationship of religion with colonialization or globalization, as well as methodology in religious studies. She is the author of Myth, Symbol, and Colonial Encounter (1995), Worse Than Beasts (2005), Louis Riel and the Creation of Modern Canada (2008), Religion, Writing, and Colonial Resistance (2011), Finding Kluskap (2013), and Religion, Postcolonialism, and Globalization (2014). She introduced a 2003 special issue of the Journal for the Study of Religion, Religion and the Imagination of Matter. She has also written op-eds for the Ottawa Citizen: one in 2008 on Louis Riel's complex identity and folk hero legacy; and another in 2009 criticizing Canada's rationale for not signing the Declaration on the Rights of Indigenous Peoples due to racial inequality concerning First Nations people. She also received a joint grant from the National Endowment for the Arts and Maine Humanities Council.

As a student of religion historian Charles H. Long, Reid is academically associated with the Chicago school, and she has engaged in academic work related to him. She edited Religion and Global Culture, a 2003 volume which focuses on Long's field of the relationship between religion and globalization, and she wrote the forward of Ellipsis..., a 2018 edited volume republishing some of Long's work.

In 2015, Reid was awarded a Guggenheim Fellowship in Religion; as part of the Fellowship, it was announced that she would to travel around North America and Australia to engage socially with activists and Indigenous lawyers concerning land rights.

Reid is a Canadian and American dual citizen.

== Bibliography ==
- Myth, Symbol, and Colonial Encounter (1995)
- (ed.) Religion, and Global Culture (2003)
- Worse Than Beasts (2005)
- Louis Riel and the Creation of Modern Canada (2008)
- Religion, Writing, and Colonial Resistance (2011)
- Finding Kluskap (2013)
- Religion, Postcolonialism, and Globalization (2014)
