= David Bashow =

Canadian author

David L. Bashow
- Born: 1946 (age 79–80); Calgary, Alberta
- Education: University of New Brunswick
- Occupation: Military historian
- Notable work: No Prouder Place: Canadians and the Bomber Command Experience 1939–1945 (2005)

David L. Bashow (born 1946) is a Canadian author. Bashow served 36 years in the Royal Canadian Air Force, and is a retired Lieutenant-Colonel.

== Career ==
Bashow was born in Calgary, Alberta. He moved to Fredericton with his family in 1958, and attended high school and then the University of New Brunswick (UNB). He joined the Canadian Air Force after graduating from UNB, serving as a fighter pilot; he has written books on air-force related topics, and has taught both in the United States and in Canada.

Bashow, who lives in Canada with his wife Heather, is an associate professor of history at the Royal Military College of Canada, and editor of Canadian Military Journal, a bilingual, peer-reviewed academic journal.

Bashow's book Knights of the Air, about Canadian fighter pilots in the First World War, revisited an aspect of history covered as heroic and chivalrous by earlier writers, including Norman Harris in Knights of the Air (1958), and Arch Whitehouse's The Years of the Sky Kings (1959). Bashow sees the air war as "a dirty piece of business," in which the flying aces "were a rather ruthless bunch, who often travelled alone, looked for the weak or wounded, snuck up behind them and shot them in the back." He weighs in on longstanding disputes, arguing that Billy Bishop did carry out a solo attack on a German aerodrome at dawn and that Roy Brown was not the pilot who shot down the "Red Baron," Manfred von Richthofen.

Bashow's book All the Fine Young Eagles, about the Canadian fighter pilots in the Second World War. Bashow had a Starfighter poster on his wall as a teenager, and flew them as a peacetime Air force pilot.

=== Controversies ===
- Regarding whether a Canadian or an Australian fired the fatal bullet that killed German Air Force pilot The Red Baron during World War I in France, Bashow, editor of Canada Military Journal (and a former Royal Canadian Air Force pilot) came down on the Australian side: "(Brown’s) flight-path geometry just does not work." The New York Times's first report, 2 days after it happened, April 23, 1918 didn't take sides then, and used the word "presumably" in 1971 for the Canadian side.
  - Interest had renewed on the 100th anniversary, and Britannica's Last Updated: Oct 15, 2018 wording credited Australia but acknowledged the Canadian claim as "according to another account."
  - CNN summarized PBS's survey of various writings over the past century as "The question .. has never been conclusively settled."
- Regarding his taking sides about reviews of a book that advocates for "families battling ... the way the Canadian Forces treats its soldiers and families." Bashow wrote "We have a bit of a situation here" to describe the outcome of his decision to publish what a Canadian newspaper called "a mildly positive review." Bashow's situation was said to be "in a predicament" when faced with having to publish a rebuttal "twice the length" of the original review, which had described "how the military and government poorly treats injured soldiers and their families."

=== Works ===
- Starfighter: A Loving Retrospective of the CF-104 Era in Canadian Fighter Aviation, 1961–1986. Fortress Publications Inc., 1990.
- All the Fine Young Eagles (Stoddart Publishing, 1996). An updated and expanded second edition was published in 2016.
- Knights of the Air: Canadian Fighter Pilots in the World War. L. Bashow (McArthur & Company Publishing; 2000)
- None But The Brave (Canadian Defense Academy Press)
- No Prouder Place: Canadians and the Bomber Command Experience 1939–1945 (Vanwell Publishing, 2005)
