= Carl Berger =

Canadian historian (1939–2026)

Carl Berger FRSC
- Born: 25 February 1939; The Pas, Manitoba, Canada
- Died: 1 October 2026 (aged 87); Toronto, Ontario, Canada
- Occupations: Academic, historian
- Spouses: Marjorie Papworth (div.); Laurel Sefton MacDowell
- Children: 2
- Awards: Governor General's Award

Academic background
- Education: B.A., University of Manitoba; M.A., University of Toronto; PhD, University of Toronto
- Doctoral advisor: Maurice Careless

Academic work
- Doctoral students: Doug Owram
- Notable works: The Sense of Power (1970); The Writing of Canadian History (1976, 2nd ed. 1986)

Carl Clinton Berger FRSC (25 February 1939 – 1 October 2026) was a Canadian academic and author. He was a professor of Canadian history at the University of Toronto from 1964 until his retirement in 2003. His research interests are Canadian intellectual history and Canadian historiography. His 1976 book, The Writing of Canadian History, was the first in-depth study of Canadian historiography, eliciting critical praise and winning the Governor General's Award.

== Early life and education ==
Carl Berger was born in The Pas, Manitoba, on 25 February 1939. He earned his bachelor's degree at the University of Manitoba in 1961 and his master's degree at the University of Toronto in 1962. He completed his PhD at the University of Toronto in 1967, supervised by historian Maurice Careless.

== Academic career ==
Berger was appointed at the University of Toronto in 1964, serving as a professor in Canadian history until his retirement in 2003. He served as the doctoral advisor of several prominent Canadian historians, including Gerald Friesen, a professor at the University of Manitoba; Doug Owram, a professor, deputy vice chancellor and principal for the University of British Columbia, Okanagan campus; Brook Taylor, a professor at Mount St. Vincent University; Michael Gauvreau, a professor at McMaster University; and historian Marlene Shore.

His research focused on Canada's intellectual history and Canadian historiography. His 1970 book, The Sense of Power, argues that Canadian nationalism originated in British imperialism, concluding that "Imperialism was one form of Canadian nationalism." Historian Terry Crowley writes that the book "added a new dimension to historical scholarship in revealing the complicated roles that ideas play in history", and historian Adele Perry describes the book as anticipating historical disputes in the 1990s regarding the relationship between nation and empire. Writing in 2009, Perry describes the book as a "standard reference for studies of English Canada and imperialism".

Berger's 1976 book, The Writing of Canadian History, was the first in-depth work of Canadian historiography. The book earned critical praise and won the Governor General's Award. Crowley describes the book as a "landmark", writing that it "cast a mirror on an academic discipline that had been little prone to introspection". Berger wrote a second edition of the book, published in 1986. In 1976, Berger was elected a Fellow of the Royal Society of Canada, and the Society awarded him the J. B. Tyrrell Historical Medal in 1984.

== Death ==
Berger died on 1 October 2026, at the age of 87.
