= Andrew Godefroy =

Canadian scholar (born 1972)

Andrew Barrett Godefroy
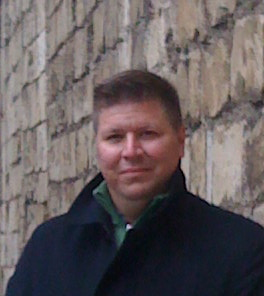
- Born: May 2, 1972 (age 54); Montreal, Quebec
- Education: Concordia University (BA); Royal Military College of Canada (MA, PhD)
- Occupation: Scholar
- Writing career
- Genres: Science and technology, military history, and strategy
- Website: andrewgodefroy.com

Andrew Barrett Godefroy CD is a Canadian strategic analyst and science and technology historian.

== Early life and education ==
Andrew Godefroy was born in Montreal, Quebec, and attended Concordia University, where he studied Canadian military history. His undergraduate thesis was a study of executions of Canadian soldiers for military crimes in the First World War. He completed a Master's degree and a PhD in War Studies at the Royal Military College of Canada. His graduate and post-graduate studies focused on aerospace history and the Canadian rocketry and space program. Godefroy is also an officer in the Canadian Army.

Godefroy held the Canadian Visiting Research Fellowship in the Changing Character of Warfare Programme at the University of Oxford in 2009. His research focused on change in the British, American, and Canadian armies since the Cold War period.

== Publications ==
Godefroy's first book, a study of the death penalty in the Canadian Expeditionary Force, was published in 1998. His doctoral dissertation examined the origins and evolution of Canada's defence space program. His post-graduate dissertation examined defence innovation among the main Western allies, specifically America, Britain, Canada, Australia, and New Zealand (ABCANZ).

== Books ==
Great War Commands: Historical Perspectives on Canadian Army Leadership, 1914–1918 (2010)

- Godefroy, Andrew B. (1998). For Freedom and Honour?: The Story of the 25 Canadian Volunteers Executed in the First World War. Ottawa: CEF Books. ISBN 1-896979-22-X.
- Godefroy, Andrew, ed. (2009). Bush Warfare: The Early Writings of General Sir William C.G. Heneker, KCB, KCMG, DSO (PDF). Kingston: St. Joseph Print Group. ISBN 978-1-100-10301-3. Archived from the original (PDF) on June 10, 2011.
- Godefroy, Andrew, ed. (2010). Great War Commands: Historical Perspectives on Canadian Army Leadership, 1914–1918 (PDF). Kingston: Canadian Defence Academy Press. ISBN 978-1-100-15601-9.
- Godefroy, Andrew (2011). Defence and Discovery: Canada's Military Space Program, 1945–74. Studies in Canadian military history. Vancouver: UBC Press. ISBN 978-0-7748-1959-6. ISSN 1499-6251.
- Godefroy, Andrew B. (2014). In Peace Prepared: Innovation and Adaptation in Canada's Cold War Army. Studies in Canadian military history. Vancouver: UBC Press. ISBN 978-0-7748-2702-7. ISSN 1499-6251.
- Godefroy, Andrew (2017). The Canadian Space Program: From Black Brant to the International Space Station. New York: Springer Praxis Books. ISBN 978-3-319-40104-1.

== Selected book chapters ==
- Godefroy, Andrew (2005). "Orbital Asset or Overhead Menace? Space Power and Special Operations". In Last, David (ed.). Choice of Force: Special Operations for Canada. Montreal and Kingston: McGill-Queen's University Press. pp. 205–218.
- Godefroy, Andrew (2005). "An Overview of Fictional Writing and the Canadian Army of the Future". In Schroeder, Karl (ed.). Crisis in Zefra: Directorate of Land Concepts and Doctrine (PDF). Kingston: Department of National Defence. pp. 127–134. ISBN 0-662-40643-5.
- Godefroy, Andrew (2006). "The Intangible Defence: Canada's Militarization and Weaponization of Space". In Horn, Bernd (ed.). The Canadian Way of War: Serving the National Interest. Toronto: Dundurn Press. pp. 327–357. ISBN 9781550026122.
- Godefroy, Andrew (2006). "Canadian Military Effectiveness in the First World War". In Horn, Bernd (ed.). The Canadian Way of War: Serving the National Interest. Toronto: Dundurn Press. pp. 169–194. ISBN 9781550026122.
- Godefroy, Andrew (2007). "Trenches Should Never Be Saved: The 4th Canadian Division at Vimy Ridge". In Hayes, Geoffrey; Iarocci, Andrew; Bechthold, Mike (eds.). Vimy Ridge: A Canadian Reassessment. Waterloo: Wilfrid Laurier University Press. pp. 211–224. ISBN 9781554580958.
- Godefroy, Andrew (2007). "The German Army at Vimy Ridge". In Hayes, Geoffrey; Iarocci, Andrew; Bechthold, Mike (eds.). Vimy Ridge: A Canadian Reassessment. Waterloo: Wilfrid Laurier University Press. pp. 225–238. ISBN 9781554580958.
- Gizewski, Peter; Godefroy, Andrew (2007). "Chapter 7: Force Requirements (Land)". In MacDonald, Brian (ed.). Defence Requirements for Canada's Arctic (PDF). Vimy Paper 2007. Ottawa: The Conference of Defence Associations Institute. ISBN 978-0-9698881-6-1.
- Godefroy, Andrew B. (2007). "Chapter 2: Portrait of a Battalion Commander: Lieutenant-Colonel George Stuart Tuxford at the Second Battle of Ypres, April 1915". In Horn, Bernd (ed.). Intrepid Warriors: Perspectives on Canadian Military Leaders (PDF). Kingston and Toronto: Canadian Defence Academy Press and Dundurn Press. pp. 59–74. ISBN 978-1-55002-711-2.
- Godefroy, Andrew (2008). "Chapter 7: Daring Innovation: The Canadian Corps and Trench Raiding on the Western Front". In Horn, Bernd (ed.). Show No Fear: Daring Actions in Canadian Military History. Toronto: Dundurn Press. ISBN 978-1550028164.
- Godefroy, Andrew (2009). "A Clash of Wills: The Canadian Struggle for Mount Sorrell, 2 June 1916". In Horn, Bernd (ed.). Fortune Favours the Brave: Tales of Courage and Tenacity in Canadian Military History. Toronto: Dundurn Press. pp. 175–200. ISBN 9781550028416.
- Godefroy, Andrew (2012). "Wartime Military Innovation and the Creation of Canada's Defence Research Board". In Hayes, Geoff; Bechthold, Mike; Symes, Matt (eds.). Canada and the Second World War: Essays in Honour of Terry Copp. Waterloo: Wilfrid Laurier University Press. pp. 199–218. ISBN 9781554586455.
- Godefroy, Andrew (2013). "Prometheus Bound: Canada's Defence Space Program in the Year 2025". In Granatstein, Jack L. (ed.). The Canadian Forces in 2025: Prospects and Problems. Victoria, BC: FriesenPress. pp. 107–134. ISBN 9781460216286.

== Selected articles ==
- Godefroy, Andrew (Spring 1999). "A Lesson in Success: The Calonne Trench Raid, 17 January 1917" (PDF). Canadian Military History. 8 (2). Laurier Centre for the Study of Canada: 25–34.
- Godefroy, Andrew (Summer 2000). "Is the Sky Falling? Canada's Defence Space Program at the Crossroads" (PDF). Canadian Military Journal. 1 (2). Canadian Armed Forces: 51–58. ISSN 1492-0786.
- Godefroy, Andrew B. (Spring 2007). "Chasing the Silver Bullet: the Evolution of Capability Development in the Canadian Army" (PDF). Canadian Military Journal. 8 (2). Canadian Armed Forces: 53–66. ISSN 1492-0786.
- Godefroy, Andrew (Fall 2008). "From Gentleman Cadet to No Known Grave: The Life and Death of Lieutenant Franklin Sharp Rankin, 1894–1916" (PDF). The Canadian Air Force Journal. 1 (3). Chief of the Air Staff: 11–19.
- Ruff, Alex; Godefroy, Andrew (Fall 2008). "Forging Land Forces for the Army of Tomorrow—The Battle Group 2021 Study" (PDF). The Canadian Army Journal. 11 (3). Canadian Army: 11–19.
- Godefroy, Andrew (Spring 2008). "A Force of Reason: Canada, Central America, and the Grupo de Observadores de la Naciones Unidas para Centro America (ONUCA), 1983–1992" (PDF). Canadian Military History. 17 (2). Laurier Centre for the Study of Canada: 5–20.
- Godefroy, Andrew B. (Winter 2008). "Canadian Soldiers in West African Conflicts, 1885–1905" (PDF). Canadian Military History. 17 (1). Laurier Centre for the Study of Canada: 21–36.
- Godefroy, Andrew (Autumn 2009). "The Royal Military College of Canada and the Education of Officers for the Great War" (PDF). Canadian Military History. 18 (4). Laurier Centre for the Study of Canada: 17–31.
- Godefroy, Andrew B. (Summer 2009). "For Queen, King and Empire: Canadians Recruited into the British Army, 1858–1944". Journal of the Society for Army Historical Research. 87 (350). Society for Army Historical Research: 135–149. JSTOR 44232821.
- Godefroy, Andrew (2010). "Letting Clausewitz Go: The Lesson the Canadian Army Must Learn From Afghanistan" (PDF). Canadian Military Journal. 10 (3). Canadian Armed Forces: 53–58. ISSN 1492-0786.
- Godefroy, Andrew B. (2013). "Allies in Orbit: Files From the RCAF's Cold War Space Program". Airforce Magazine. Vol. 37, no. 1. Royal Canadian Air Force Association. pp. 32–37.
