= Paul Cowan (journalist) =

Scottish-Canadian journalist

Paul Cowan is a Scottish-Canadian journalist and writer. Raised in Lanarkshire, Cowan became interested in journalism after appearing on BBC Radio Scotland's young adult current affairs program Sunday Club. He joined the Glasgow Herald as a copy-boy and was one of the first Scottish journalists to bring the Gaelic rock band Runrig to national attention. Cowan then attended the pre-entry journalism course at Napier College in Edinburgh before joining the Inverness Courier. This was followed by work at the Shetland Times and then a return to the Courier as chief reporter. Cowan then worked as a reporter on the Evening Chronicle in Tyneside. He left to hitch-hike across Canada and on his return to Scotland became editor of the Campbeltown Courier. He then returned to Canada where he was given a job on the daily Edmonton Sun. He covered the activities of Canadian troops in Kosovo and Afghanistan before leaving the newspaper to write the non-fiction books How the Scots Created Canada and Scottish Military Disasters. He then worked as a media advisor to the Saskatchewan government before returning to writing. As a freelance writer, Cowan has contributed to most of the major media outlets in the United Kingdom and Canada. In 2015, he edited the memoir of a soldier from the Highland Light Infantry called With Wellington in the Peninsula.
