= J. L. Granatstein =

Canadian historian (born 1939)

Jack Granatstein OC FRSC
- Born: Jack Lawrence Granatstein; May 21, 1939 (age 87); Toronto, Ontario, Canada
- Spouse: Elaine Granatstein (nee Hitchcock)
- Awards: Officer of the Order of Canada; Fellow of the Royal Society of Canada

Academic background
- Education: Royal Military College of Canada (BA); University of Toronto (MA); Duke University (PhD)
- Thesis: The Conservative Party of Canada, 1939–1945 (1966)
- Doctoral advisor: Theodore Ropp

Academic work
- Discipline: History
- Sub-discipline: 20th-century Canadian military history; 20th-century Canadian political history
- Institutions: York University
- Notable ideas
- Military Service
- Allegiance: Canada
- Branch: Canadian Army
- Service years: 1956–1966
- Rank: Lieutenant
- Units: Royal Military College of Canada; CFB Borden

Jack Lawrence Granatstein OC FRSC (May 21, 1939) is a Canadian historian who specializes in Canadian political and military history.

== Education ==
Born on May 21, 1939, in Toronto, Ontario, Granatstein received a graduation diploma from Royal Military College Saint-Jean in 1959, his Bachelor of Arts degree from the Royal Military College of Canada in 1961, his Master of Arts degree from the University of Toronto in 1962, and his Doctor of Philosophy degree from Duke University in 1966.

== Career ==
Granatstein is author of Who Killed Canadian History? and other books, including Yankee Go Home?, Who Killed The Canadian Military?, and Victory 1945 (with Desmond Morton).

Granatstein served as director of the Canadian War Museum in Ottawa from 1998 to 2001 supported the building of the museum's new home that opened in 2005.

== Family ==
Granatstein married Elaine Hitchcock in 1961 until her death in 2012. They had two children, Carole and Michael. He later married Linda Grayson until her death in 2019.

== Bibliography ==
- Best Little Army in the World (2015) HarperCollins, preview from Google Books
- Canada's Army: Waging War and Keeping the Peace (2002) overview of Canadian military history
  - Second Edition published 2011 with several new chapters about both Afghanistan and the effect of increased federal funding.
- Who Killed Canadian History? (1998) argues that national history has become too splintered for the nation's good; online
- Whose War Is It? (2007) critique of Canadian foreign policy and defence
- Who Killed the Canadian Military? (2004) critique of the Canadian military
- Prime Ministers: Ranking Canada's Leaders (1999) with Norman Hillmer.
- Yankee Go Home?: Canadians and Anti-Americanism (1996) Granatstein maintains that what began as a justifiable fear of invasion eventually became a tool of the economic and political elites bent on preserving their power. At first, anti-Americanism was largely the Tory way of keeping pro-British attitudes uppermost in the minds of Canadians. Later, with the right wing embracing the free-trade deal, it became the most important weapon of the nationalist left.
- Canada's War: The Politics of the Mackenzie King Government, 1939–1945 political manoeuvres of the King government during World War II online
- The Ottawa Men: The Civil Service Mandarins, 1935–1957 (1982) Oxford University Press examines the development of the federal civil service and its contribution to Canada's coming of age as a nation. online
  - reissued (2015) The Ottawa Men by Rock's Mills Press, with a new introduction surveying research since 1982, and more photographs.
- Mackenzie King (1975), for secondary students online
- Spy Wars: Espionage and Canada From Gouzenko to Glasnost (1990) with David Stafford
- Canada 1957-1967: (1986) A survey of the period, with close accounts of particular developments to illustrate general changes.

== See also ==
- List of Canadian historians
- Military history of Canada
- Canadian history wars

Awards
Preceded by Hubert Charbonneau	J. B. Tyrrell Historical Medal; 1992	Succeeded by Cornelius J. Jaenen
Preceded by Jacques Légaré	J. B. Tyrrell Historical Medal; 1992	Succeeded by Cornelius J. Jaenen
Preceded by Roméo Dallaire	Vimy Award; 1996	Succeeded by Brian Dickson
