= Canadian Military Journal =

- Discipline: Military
- Language: English

Publication details
- Frequency: Quarterly

Standard abbreviations
- ISO 4: Can. Mil. J.

Indexing
- ISSN: 1492-465X

Links
- Journal homepage

The Canadian Military Journal is the official quarterly peer-reviewed academic journal of the Canadian Forces and the Department of National Defence. It is printed in both official languages in electronic and paper print. The editor-in-chief is David Bashow.
