= List of Canadian historians =

This is a list of the most prominent historians of Canada. All have published about Canada, but some have covered other topics as well.

== A-G ==
- Irving Abella (1940–2022), Jewish and labour
- James Murray Beck (1914–2011), Nova Scotia, biographer of Joseph Howe
- David Bercuson (born 1945), labour, military, politics
- Pierre Berton (1920–2004), numerous popular histories
- Carol Bishop-Gwyn, dance
- Conrad Black (born 1944), biographer of Duplessis; history of Canada
- Ted Byfield (1928–2021), two 12-volume history series on Alberta and Christian civilization
- Michael Bliss (1941–2017), medical
- Robert Bothwell (born 1944), 20th century
- Gerard Bouchard (born 1943), Quebec
- Mark Bourrie, maritime, media
- George Williams Brown (1894–1963), editor and textbooks
- Nick Brune, textbooks
- J. M. S. Careless (1919–2009), politics
- Pierre Francois Xavier de Charlevoix (1682–1761), New France
- Sean Carleton, historian Canadian identity
- Margaret Conrad, women, maritimes
- G. Ramsay Cook (1931–2016), politics, biography
- Terry Copp, World War II
- Tim Cook (1971–2025), military historian
- Hugh Cowan (1867–1943), Ontario
- Donald Creighton (1902–1979), 19c, textbooks
- Ernest Alexander Cruikshank (1853–1939), military and Ontario, chairman of the Historic Sites and Monuments Board
- Brian Cuthbertson (1936–2023), Nova Scotia
- Ken Cuthbertson (born 1951), biographer and author of 20th-century Canadian history
- Joan Dawson, Nova Scotia
- Louise Dechêne (1928–2000), New France
- J. Alphonse Deveau (1917–2004), Acadian
- Katherine Dewar (1943–2026), women in the World Wars
- Lovat Dickson (1902–1987), 20th century
- Gordon Donaldson (1926–2001), politics
- Olive Dickason (1920–2011), First Nations
- Gwynne Dyer (born 1943), British-Canadian military historian, author, professor, journalist, broadcaster, and retired naval officer
- William J. Eccles (1917–1998), New France
- Shirley Elliott, legislative librarian of Nova Scotia
- Marie Elwood (1932–2012), ceramics
- John English (born 1945), politics
- Judith Fingard, Eastern Canada
- Elizabeth Frame (1820–1904), Nova Scotia and the Mi'kmaq
- Francois Xavier Garneau (1809–1866), Quebec
- Placide Gaudet (1850–1930), Acadian
- Andrew Godefroy (born 1972), military
- W. G. Godfrey, Maritimes
- George R. D. Goulet, Métis
- Terry Goulet (born 1934), Métis
- J. L. Granatstein (born 1939), 20th century, military; politics; historiography
- Charlotte Gray (born 1948), popular histories
- James H. Gray (1906–1998), Prairies; politics
- Cody Groat, First Nations
- Lionel Groulx (1878–1967), Quebec
- William B. Hamilton (1929–2012), toponymy
- Kenn Harper (born 1945), Inuit
- Craig Heron, labour and social history, public history
- Bruce Hodgins (1931–2019), historian and author
- Bruce Hutchison (1901–1992), local history, popular history
- Harold Innis (1894–1952), economic history; communications
- A. J. B. Johnston
- Gregory Kealey, labour
- Gustave Lanctot (1883–1975), New France
- Fred Landon (1880–1969), Ontario, Upper Canada
- Laurier LaPierre (1929–2012)
- Agnes Laut (1871–1936)
- Arthur R. M. Lower (1889–1988)
- Keith Matthews
- Margaret MacMillan (born 1943), diplomacy
- Allan Marble, medical history
- Christopher McCreery, orders, decorations, and medals
- Ian McKay
- Peter Thomas McGuigan (1942–2017), Nova Scotia
- Phyllis McKie (1929–1983), maritime history
- Margaret Stovel McWilliams (1875–1952), Manitoba
- Jesse Edgar Middleton (1872–1960), Ontario, Toronto
- Christopher Moore (born 1950), popular
- Robert Morgan (1938–2011), Cape Breton history
- Adrien-Gabriel Morice (1859–1939), First Nations
- Desmond Morton (1937–2019), military
- W. L. Morton (1908–1980), West; Manitoba
- William D. Naftel (1940–2018), military history
- Hilda Neatby (1904–1975), Quebec
- Peter C. Newman (1929–2023), 20th-century politics

== O-Z ==
- Margaret Ormsby (1909–1996)
- Fernand Ouellet (1926–2021)
- Douglas Owram (born 1947)
- Erna Paris (1938–2022)
- Talbot Mercer Papineau (1883–1917)
- Francis Parkman (1823–1893), American historian of New France
- Lester B. Pearson (1897–1972)
- Derek Penslar
- Bob Plamondon (born 1957)
- Andrew Preston (born 1973)
- Robie Lewis Reid
- Stanley Bréhaut Ryerson (1911–1998)
- Paul St. Pierre (1923–2014)
- Roger Sarty (born 1952)
- John Saywell (1929–2011)
- Joseph Schull (1906–1980)
- Adam Shortt (1859–1931)
- Jean Edward Smith (1932–2019)
- C.H.J. Snider (1879-1971)
- Charles Perry Stacey (1906–1989)
- George Stanley (1907–2002)
- Veronica Strong-Boag
- Alastair Sweeny
- Bruce Trigger (1937–2006)
- Marcel Trudel (1917–2011)
- Pierre Elliot Trudeau (1919–2000)
- Frank Underhill (1889–1971)
- Mark Sweeten Wade
- Frederick William Wallace (1886–1958)
- Patrick Watson (1929–2022)
- Ruth Holmes Whitehead (1947–2023)
- Frederick George H. Williams (1863–1944)
- George Woodcock (1912–1995)
- Andrew Woolford, genocide scholar
- Amanda Wilce
- J. F. C. Wright
- George MacKinnon Wrong (1860–1948)
- Robert J. Young

== By category ==
To display all subcategories below, click on the ►

== See also ==
- Historiography of Canada
- History of Canada
- List of historians
- Lists of Canadian writers
- The Canadian Centenary Series
