= Albert B. Corey Prize =

Canadian history prize

The Albert B. Corey Prize is an academic prize, granted jointly by the Canadian Historical Association and American Historical Association every two years for the best historical books on the history of Canada and the United States of America, or Canadian-American relations. The prize has been awarded biennially since 1967, and notable recipients include Gustave Lanctot, Charles Perry Stacey, James Eayrs, and James L. Axtell.

== Establishment ==
The Albert B. Corey Prize was established in 1967, jointly by the American Historical Association and Canadian Historical Association. The prize is named after its proposer, Albert B. Corey, who then chaired a joint committee of members from both associations, and suggested establishing such a prize to encourage research in Canadian-American relations.

== Recipients ==
Year	Name	Book	Source
1967	Gustave Lanctot	Canada and the American Revolution (Harvard University Press)	
1969	Kenneth Bourne	Britain and the Balance of Power in North America, 1815–1908 (University of California Press)	
1972	Charles Perry Stacey	Arms, Men, and Governments: The War Policies of Canada 1939–45 (The Queen's Printer, Ottawa)	
1974	Lester Pearson	Mike: The Memoirs of the Right Honourable Lester B. Pearson, vol. 1 (1972) and vol. 2 (1973) (University of Toronto Press and Quadrangle Books)	
1976	Robert Babcock	Gompers in Canada: A Study in American Continentalism before the First World War (University of Toronto Press)	
1978	Michael Katz	The People of Hamilton, Canada West: Family and Class in a Mid-19th-Century City (Harvard University Press)	
1980	Robert Bothwell	C. D. Howe (McClelland and Stewart)	
1982	Guildo Rousseau	L'image des Etats-unis dans la litterature quebecoise, 1775–1930 (Editions Naaman)	
1984	James Eayrs	In Defence of Canada. Indochina: Roots of Complicity (University of Toronto Press)	
1984	Gregory Kealey and Bryan Palmer	Dreaming of What Might Be: The Knights of Labour in Ontario, 1880–1900 (Cambridge University Press)	
1986	James Axtell	The Invasion Within: The Contest of Cultures in Colonial North America (Oxford University Press)	
1988	Elizabeth Jane Errington	The Lion, the Eagle, and Upper Canada: A Developing Colonial Ideology (McGill-Queen’s University Press)	
1990	Reginald Stuart	United States Expansionism and British North America 1775-1871 (Univ. of North Carolina Press)	
1992	Richard White	The Middle Ground: Indians, Empires, Republics in the Great Lakes Regions, 1650-1815 (Cambridge Univ. Press)	
1994	Royden Loewen	Family, Church, and Market: A Mennonite Community in the Old and the New Worlds 1850-1930 (Univ. of Toronto Press)	
1996	Ernest Clarke	The Siege of Fort Cumberland 1776: An Episode in the American Revolution (McGill-Queen's Univ. Press)	
1998	Elizabeth Vibert	Traders' Tales: Narratives of Cultural Encounters in the Columbia Plateau, 1807-46 (Univ. of Oklahoma Press)	
2000	Karen Dubinsky	The Second Greatest Disappointment: Honeymooners, Heterosexuality, and the Tourist Industry at Niagara Falls (Rutgers Univ. Press)	
2002	Francis Carroll	A Good and Wise Measure: The Search for the Canadian-American Boundary, 1783-1842 (Univ. of Toronto Press)	
2004	Steven High	Industrial Sunset: The Making of North America's Rust Belt, 1969-84 (Univ. of Toronto Press)	
2006	John Bukowczyk, Nora Faires, David Smith, and Randy Widdis	Permeable Border: The Great Lakes Basin as Transnational Region, 1650-1990 (Univ. of Pittsburgh Press and Univ. of Calgary Press)	
2008	Sharon Roger Hepburn	Crossing the Border: A Free Black Community in Canada (Univ. of Illinois Press)	
2010	David Preston	The Texture of Contact: European and Indian Settler Communities on the Frontiers of Iroquoia, 1667-1783 (Univ. of Nebraska Press)	
2012	Karen Balcom	The Traffic in Babies: Cross-Border Adoption and Baby-Selling between the United States and Canada, 1930-73 (Univ. of Toronto Press)	
2014	Lissa Wadewitz	The Nature of Borders: Salmon, Boundaries, and Bandits on the Salish Sea (Univ. of Washington Press)	
2016	Robert MacDougall	The People's Network: The Political Economy of the Telephone in the Gilded Age (Univ. of Pennsylvania Press)	
2018	Ann M. Little	The Many Captivities of Esther Wheelwright (Yale Univ. Press)	
2020	Jamie Benidickson	Levelling the Lake: Transboundary Resource Management in the Lake of the Woods Watershed (UBC Press)	
