= Keith Matthews =

Keith Matthews may refer to:

- Keith Matthews (footballer) (1934–2008), Welsh footballer
- Keith Matthews (historian) (1938–1984), British-born historian of Newfoundland
- Keith Matthews (rugby union) (born 1982), Irish rugby union player
- Keith "Two-Bit" Matthews, fictional character in the novel The Outsiders
