= New Hogtown Press =

Canadian publisher

New Hogtown Press was a Canadian left-wing publisher active during the 1970s and 1980s.

== History ==
The press originated as the literature service of the Canadian Union of Students (CUS), producing and distributing pamphlets on education, Canadian political economy, and other issues during the late 1960s. When the Canadian Union of Students dissolved in 1969, a group of Toronto CUS activists decided that the literature service should be kept going as an independent organization. They formed Hogtown Press, continued distributing the CUS pamphlets, and began producing and distributing new titles as well.

After a period of time, the original collective moved on, and in 1972 a new group, initially funded by the University of Toronto Students’ Administrative Council, took over the operation. The new collective shifted the project's focus away from the campus to a broader range of issues, and changed the name to New Hogtown Press. Subsequently, the press became an independent non-profit corporation. The all-volunteer collective began to publish a substantial number of new pamphlets, with particular emphasis on Canadian working class and radical history, women's liberation, and social history.

New Hogtown Press also became a distributor for pamphlets produced by a broad range of other small left-wing publishers and collectives, such as Dumont Press Graphix, The Last Post, This Magazine is About Schools, Toronto Committee for the Liberation of Portugal's African Colonies (TCLPAC), Latin American Working Group, Development Education Centre (DEC), Better Read Graphics, NC Press, Women's Press, Exploding Myths Comic Book Collective, Pollution Probe, Peoples Press, New England Free Press, Black and Red, the New Tendency, Wages for Housework, Industrial Worker, New Star Books, Socialist Reproduction, and Press Gang Publishers.

In 1975, Hogtown started to publish books as well as pamphlets. The first title off the press was Jesse Lemisch's On Active Service in War and Peace, which documented the way in which the American historical profession had put itself in the service of American state and corporate power. By 1975, more than 12,000 of its pamphlets had been distributed across Canada and internationally.

Subsequent titles included The Great War and Canadian Society, Imperialism, Nationalism, and Canada, and Eight Men Speak.

Members of the collective during its period of peak activity included Richard Wright, Joel Lexchin, Russell Hann, Gregory Kealey, Thom Schofield, Craig Heron, Krys Dobrowolski, Ulli Diemer, Elaine Farragher, Lori Rotenberg, Daphne Read, Miriam Ticoll, Karolyn Kendrick, and Gus Richardson.

An ongoing challenge for Hogtown was that of setting publishing and political priorities. Some members were primarily interested in academically oriented manuscripts, especially in the fields of Canadian labour, women's, and social history. These were publications which would typically take several years to move from their date of conception to their publication date. Other collective members, who saw the primary mandate of Hogtown as popular education, were more concerned with publishing popularly oriented materials which dealt with current issues and which could be written, published, and distributed quickly.

From a business point of view, neither kind of title could be counted on to generate reliable revenue flows, so throughout its existence, Hogtown struggled with the financial challenges of operating a socialist enterprise in a capitalist system, attempting to carry out a professional publishing program on an all-volunteer or almost all-volunteer basis. The press nevertheless produced a substantial list of titles through the years of its existence, and for a time was a major distributor of left-wing materials in English Canada. A possible indicator of its perceived importance was that on at least two occasions in the early 1970s, break-ins in which nothing of apparent value was stolen occurred at the premises occupied by Hogtown.

After two decades of operation, New Hogtown Press gradually wound down its publishing program around 1990, although previously published titles continued to be available for a number of years subsequently.

== Pamphlets published by Hogtown Press and New Hogtown Press (partial list) ==
Titles dated prior to 1972 are Hogtown Press.

- Margaret Benston: The Political Economy of Women's Liberation. (1970)
- Mickey and John Rowntree: More on the Political Economy of Women's Liberation. (1970)
- Daniel Drache. Rediscovering Canadian History. (1971)
- Ernest Mandel: Capitalism and Regional Disparities. (1971)
- Kathleen Gough: The Origin of the Family. (1972)
- Carl Rogers. Towards a Science of the Person: An Alternative to Behaviourism. (1972)
- Paul Craven & David Clark. Corporate Research Guide. (1973)
- Stephen Arnold: Third World Literature or Absurd World Literature? A Canadian, Future, Socialist Perspective. (1973)
- Free School Handbook. (1973)
- Kathleen Gough: Women in Evolution. (1973)
- Quebec Solidarity Committee News Service: Quebec ’72. (1973)
- Quebec Teachers’ Corporation Manifesto. Our Schools Serve the Ruling Class. (1973)
- Canadian Chamber of Commerce: The Communist Threat to Canada. (1947, 1973)
- The Decline and Fall of a Good Idea: CCF-NDP Manifestos, 1932–1969. (1974)
- Leo A. Johnson: Poverty in Wealth: The Capitalist Labour Market and Income Distribution in Canada. (1974)
- Gregory S. Kealey: Hogtown: Working Class Toronto at the Turn of the Century. (1974)
- Russell Hann: Farmers Confront Industrialism: Some Historical Perspectives on Ontario Agrarian Movements. (1975)
- Steven Langdon: The Emergence of the Canadian Working Class Movement, 1845–75. (1975)
- A Guide to Working Class History. (1975)
- Patricia V. Schulz: The East York Workers’ Association: A Response to the Great Depression. (1975)
- Randy Morse and Larry Pratt: Darkness at the End of the Tunnel: A Radical Analysis of Canadian-American Relations. (1975)
- Martin Glaberman. Four Essays on the Working Class. (1975)
- M. Gordon: Anti-Corporate Research Guide. (1975)
- Leo Panitch: Workers, Wages and Controls: The Anti-Inflation Programme and Its Implications for Canadian Workers. (1976)

== Books published by New Hogtown Press ==
- Jesse Lemisch: On Active Service in War and Peace: Politics and Ideology in the American Historical Profession. (1975)
- Imperialism, Nationalism, and Canada: Essays from the Marxist Institute of Toronto. ISBN 978-0-919940-05-5. (1975)
- Daphne Read (ed.): The Great War and Canadian Society: An Oral History. (1975)
- Richard Wright and Robin Endres (eds.): Eight men speak, and other plays from the Canadian workers' theatre. (1976)
- Dawn Fraser: Echoes from Labour's War: Industrial Cape Breton in the 1920s Narrative Verse. ISBN 978-0-919940-09-3. (1976)
- Robert J. Brym and R. James Sauouman (eds.): Underdevelopment and Social Movements in Atlantic Canada. (1979)
- Donna Phillips: Voices of Discord: Canadian short stories from the 1930s. ISBN 0-919940-12-9. (c. 1979)
- Beth Light and Alison Prentice (eds.): Pioneer and Gentlewomen of British North America 1713 - 1867. (1980)
- Bryan D. Palmer: The Making of E.P. Thompson. ISBN 0-919940-17-X. (1981)
- Beth Light and Joy Parr (eds.): Canadian Women on the Move, 1867–1920. (1983)
- David Leadbeater: Essays on the Political Economy of Alberta. ISBN 0-919940-19-6. (1984)
- Paula Bourne: Women's Paid and Unpaid Work: Historical and Contemporary Perspectives. ISBN 0-919940-20-X. (1985)
- Gregory S. Kealey and Brian D. Palmer: Dreaming of What Might Be: The Knights of Labor in Ontario 1880–1900. ISBN 0-919940-22-6. (1987)
- Beth Light and Ruth Roach Pierson (eds.): No Easy Road: Women in Canada 1920s – 1960s. (1990)
- Annalee Golz et al.: A Decent Living: Women Workers in the Winnipeg Garment Industry. ISBN 0-919940-26-9. (c. 1991)
