= G. W. L. Nicholson =

British-Canadian historian (1902–1980)

- Born: 6 January 1902; Weston-super-Mare, Somerset, England
- Died: 28 February 1980 (aged 78); Ottawa, Ontario, Canada
- Burial place: Pinecrest Cemetery, Ottawa
- Education: Queen's University (BA 1931); University of Toronto (BPed 1935)
- Military career
- Allegiance: Canada
- Branch: Canadian Army
- Service years: 1940–1961
- Rank: Colonel
- Units: Prince Albert Volunteers; Historical Section, General Staff
- Conflicts: World War II

Colonel Gerald William Lingen Nicholson CD (6 January 1902 – 28 February 1980) was a British-Canadian soldier, historian, author, and teacher. From 1943 until his retirement in 1961, Nicholson served in the Historical Section, Canadian Army, where in 1959 he succeeded Colonel Charles Perry Stacey to become the section's fourth director. Nicholson authored numerous histories of Canada's military. He is best known for his 1962 book Canadian Expeditionary Force, 1914-1919, the only official history of Canada's participation in World War I.

== Early life ==
Gerald William Lingen Nicholson was born on 6 January 1902 in Weston-super-Mare, Somerset, to Arthur Thomas Nicholson and Caroline Dora Middleton (1860–1932). He had a twin brother, Arthur Edmund Delabere “Ted” Nicholson (1902–1971), as well as an older brother Harry Sholto Nicholson (1893–1975). Nicholson attended Barnstaple School in Barnstaple, Devonshire, the same school John Gay had attended in the 1690s. Arthur Thomas Nicholson died during World War I, and in 1919 Caroline moved her twin sons to Canada, joining her older son Harry, who had settled on a farm near Blaine Lake, Saskatchewan.

After graduating high school Nicholson attended Saskatoon Normal School, and in 1922 began his career as a school teacher in Foam Lake, Saskatchewan. Nicholson taught school for five years before becoming a principal in 1927. His principal appointments included Foam Lake High School (1927–30), Wynyard High School (1931–35), Battleford Collegiate (1935–40), and Biggar High School (1941–42).

Nicholson attended Queen's University where he graduated Bachelor of Arts in 1931. At Queen's he met Edith Ashcroft (1912–1998) of Kingston, Ontario, whom he wed on 10 August 1936 in Kingston. Gerald and Edith had two daughters, Dora and Sylvia. Several years after graduating from Queen's, Nicholson returned to school and in 1935 obtained a Bachelor of Paedagogy degree from the University of Toronto. Once Nicholson finished his degree in Toronto the couple returned to Saskatchewan, where Gerald took a job as the principal at Battleford Collegiate Institute.

== Military career ==
At the time of Canada's entrance into World War II, Nicholson was serving as the principal at Battleford Collegiate. In 1940, at the age of 38, he joined the Canadian Army and was commissioned into the Prince Albert and Battleford Volunteers, a Non-Permanent Active Militia regiment. In April 1941 the Battleford component of the regiment was separated and converted to infantry, and the name of the remaining component reverted to the Prince Albert Volunteers. A year later, on 5 March 1942, the 1st Battalion, Prince Albert Volunteers was activated and transferred to Vernon Military Camp as part of the 19th Infantry Brigade. Nicholson, who by this time had moved to Biggar, Saskatchewan, joined the battalion in mid-April. Upon his departure, a reporter for the Saskatoon Star-Phoenix noted, "Mr. Nicholson will be missed in Biggar, as in a short time here he has taken part in public activities, serving as president of the Canadian Club, leader of St. Paul's Church choir, and taken an interest in the dramatic and musical life of the town. He had also been connected with military organization in Bigger and was in charge of the local unit of the Reserve Army. He was also instrumental in forming a cadet corp in Biggar."

In 1943, Colonel Archer Fortescue Duguid (1887–1976) of the Canadian Army Historical Section requested Nicholson's transfer to Ottawa to join the Section. This request was based in part on a confidential report on Nicholson's character that Duguid had read. The report described Nicholson as

a confident, inspiring leader, poised, reasonably aggressive and self-assured [...] He is an excellent lecturer, which is backed up by a fine educational background and educational training as a High School Principal. He is a hard and conscientious worker and a good learner. Quite original, resourceful, and has an excellent ability. He has a charming, agreeable personality, optimistic nature, cheerful outlook [...] An artistic nature, rather than practical; is sympathetic, tactful, diplomatic, loyal, co-operative, high spirituality and sense of duty.

Shortly after his appointment to the Historical Section, Nicholson was appointed as the narrator for Pacific Command. In the wake of Operation Cottage in August 1943, he traveled in U. S. Army aircraft through the Aleutian Islands. While covering the Pacific, Nicholson was a passenger in the first American plane to land on Kiska after its capture from the Japanese. Following the cessation of hostilities in September 1945, in early 1946, new Director of the Historical Section Colonel C. P. Stacey (1906–1989) appointed Nicholson the Officer-in-Charge of the Historical Section at Canadian Military Headquarters in London. During his time in London, Nicholson gathered documents pertaining to Canada's role in the Battle of Hong Kong of December 1941. This work resulted in the 1946 pamphlet entitled Canadian Participation in the Defence of Hong Kong, December 1941. In 1947, Nicholson returned to Canada where he was appointed Deputy Director of the Historical Section, Army Headquarters, Ottawa.

During his time with the section, Nicholson authored two full-length books. The first was Marlborough and the War of the Spanish Succession, published in 1955. His next work, published a year later, was the second in the three-volume Official History of the Canadian Army in the Second World War. Nicholson's volume, The Canadians in Italy, 1943–1945, dealt exclusively with the Italian Campaign. On 1 August 1959, Nicholson took over from Col. Stacey as the director of the Historical Section. At this time he was promoted from Lieutenant-Colonel to Colonel.

== Retirement and later years ==
On 1 September 1961 Col. Nicholson retired from the Canadian Army. Upon his retirement in September, Nicholson joined the staff of Nepean High School in Ottawa's Highland Park neighbourhood, where he taught English for a single year.

The 1960s were a prolific period for Nicholson. The first book he published in the new decade was his official history of Canada's participation in World War I, released in 1962. In the introduction to the 2015 reissue of the book, Mark Osborne Humphries notes, "between 1918 and 1962, there were three abortive attempts to write Canada's official history of the Great War, but successive historians found it impossible to escape backroom intriguing, personal rivalries, and funding cuts." In November 1956 Nicholson had publicly announced that immediately after Christmas he would begin work on the history. After more than five years of work, the book was released in 1962 to much acclaim. W. H. S. Macklin reviewed the book in the Ottawa Citizen in January 1963, where he wrote,

Perhaps it was worth waiting so long to get the book that Colonel Nicholson has written. I suppose it might be possible to find some faults in any work so massive and comprehensive. In the space allotted for this review I find room to mention none. The author has discharged his task with scrupulous care for accuracy, great literary skill, and above all a sympathetic understanding of the gigantic sacrifice he was called upon to record.

The 1960s saw Nicholson release three more books. These included two volumes on the Royal Newfoundland Regiment (released in 1964 and 1969), and a history of St. John's Ambulance in Canada (released in 1966). In the 1970s, Nicholson wrote three more war histories, including works on the Royal Regiment of Canadian Artillery, nursing sisters, and the Royal Canadian Army Medical Corps. He also wrote a guide to Canadian war memorials in Europe.

Nicholson's final monograph was the humorous memoir Keep Your Forks: Fifty Years at Red Pine Camp, published in the fall of 1979, months before his death. Beginning in 1943 the Nicholsons stayed annually at Red Pine Camp, a summer resort on Golden Lake in the Ottawa Valley. Nicholson's book was published to celebrate the camp's golden jubilee in 1978, and recounts light-hearted episodes from his time there.

G. W. L. Nicholson died in Ottawa on 28 February 1980 at the age of 78. The funeral was held at St John the Evangelist Anglican Church on 3 March.

== Works ==
- Canadian Participation in the Defence of Hong Kong, December 1941 (1946)
- Marlborough and the War of the Spanish Succession (1955)
- Official History of the Canadian Army in the Second World War, Volume II. The Canadians in Italy, 1943–1945 (1956)
- Official History of the Canadian Army in the First World War. Canadian Expeditionary Force, 1914–1919 (1962)
- The Fighting Newfoundlander: A History of the Royal Newfoundland Regiment (1964)
- The White Cross in Canada: A History of St. John's Ambulance (1966)
- More Fighting Newfoundlanders (1969)
- The Gunners of Canada: The History of The Royal Regiment of Canadian Artillery, Volume II 1919–1967 (1972)
- "We Will Remember...": Overseas Memorials to Canada's War Dead (1973)
- Canada's Nursing Sisters (1975)
- Seventy Years of Service: A History of the Royal Canadian Army Medical Corps (1977)
- Keep Your Forks: Fifty Years at Red Pine Camp (1979)

== Further information ==
G. W. L. Nicholson's records form two archival fonds. The first, the Gerald William Lingen Nicholson fonds, is held at Library and Archives Canada and contains both personal information as well as his research material. The second, the G. W. L. Nicholson fonds, is held at the National Defence Headquarters Directorate of History and Heritage, and consists exclusively of research material related to his official histories of the First and Second World Wars.
