= Sweeten =

Sweeten is a surname. Notable people with the surname include:

- Madylin Sweeten (born 1991), American actress
- Mark Sweeten Wade (1858–1929), medical doctor and historian
- Sawyer Sweeten (1995–2015), American actor, brother of Madylin
