= Robert Babcock =

Robert Babcock may refer to:

- Rob Babcock (1953–2019), American basketball executive
- Robert H. Babcock (1931–2014), American historian
- Robert S. Babcock (1915–1985), American politician from Vermont
- Bob Babcock (ice hockey) (born 1968), Canadian ice hockey player
- Bob Babcock (baseball) (born 1949), American baseball player
