= Dictionary of Canadian Biography =

Dictionary of biographies of Canadian people published in both English and French

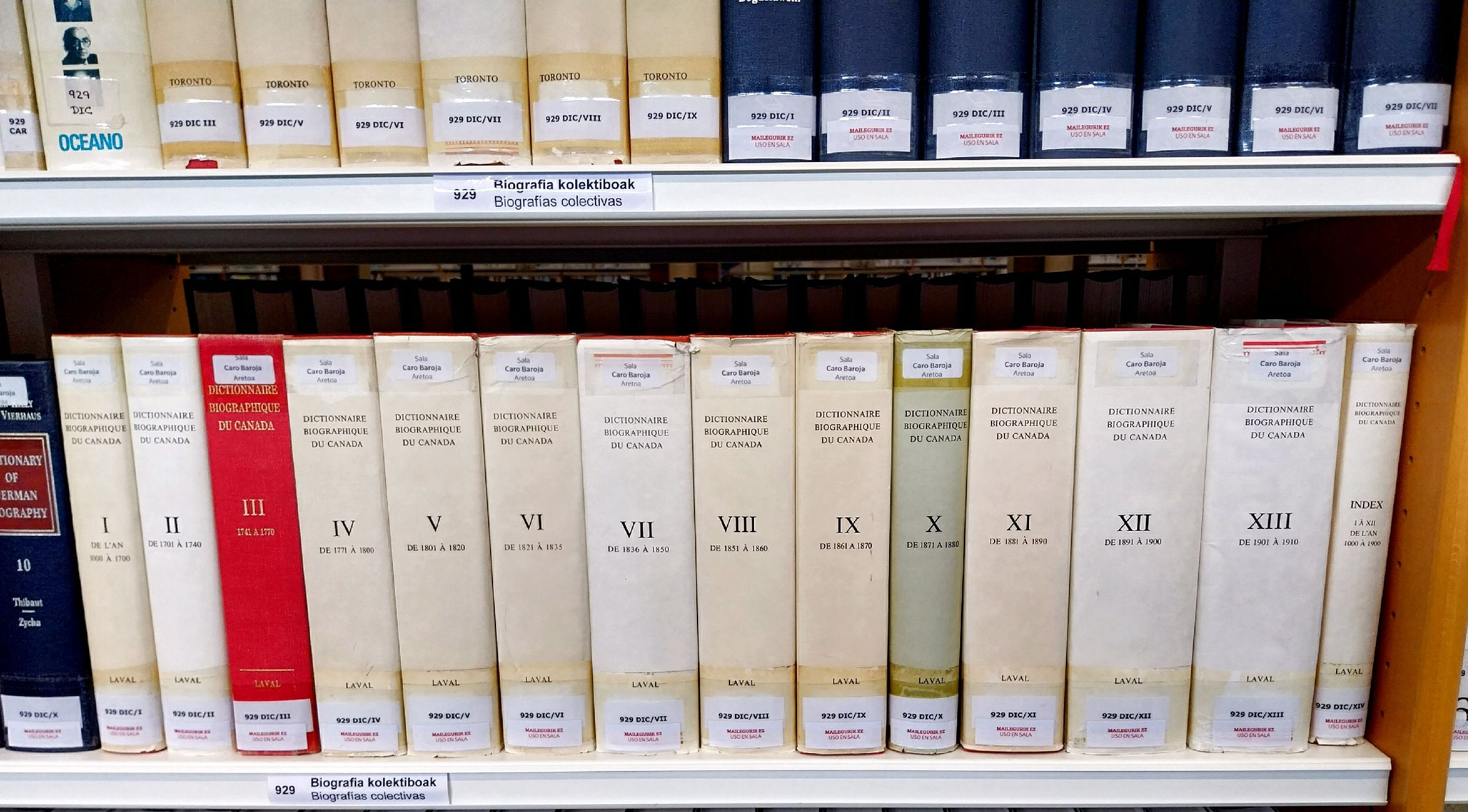
Volumes of the Dictionary of Canadian Biography/Dictionnaire biographique du Canada at the Central Library building of the Álava Campus, University of the Basque Country (UPV/EHU), Vitoria, Spain

The Dictionary of Canadian Biography (DCB; French: Dictionnaire biographique du Canada) is a dictionary of biographical entries for individuals who have contributed to the history of Canada. The DCB, which was initiated in 1959, is a collaboration between the University of Toronto and Laval University. Fifteen volumes have so far been published with more than 8,400 biographies of individuals who died or whose last known activity fell between the years 1000 and 1930. The entire print edition is online, along with some additional biographies to the year 2000.

== Establishment of the project ==
The project was undertaken following a bequest to the University of Toronto from businessman James Nicholson for the establishment of a Canadian version of the United Kingdom's Dictionary of National Biography.

In the spring of 1959, George Williams Brown was appointed general editor and the University of Toronto Press, which had been named publisher, sent out some 10,000 announcements introducing the project. Work started in July of that year. 1 July was designated the formal date of the Dictionary's establishment, not coincidentally the same day Canada's confederation is celebrated.

New ground was broken when on 9 March 1961, the French edition of the dictionary was established. No similar research or publication project of this size in English and French had ever been undertaken before in Canada. Marcel Trudel was appointed directeur adjoint for Dictionnaire biographique du Canada, Université Laval the publisher.

It had been decided from the start that for the project to have true resonance for Canadians, the French and English editions of the Dictionary would be identical in content, save for language, and each volume of the Dictionary would be issued simultaneously. The project by its nature required not only much translation, as articles would originate in English and in French, but close coordination as well.

== Publication commences ==
The first volume of the Dictionary of Canadian Biography appeared in 1966 with 594 biographies covering the years 1000 to 1700. The publishers had looked at other similar projects, such as the Dictionary of National Biography (DNB) and the Dictionary of American Biography (DAB) and concluded a different approach was required. In those dictionaries, volumes were arranged alphabetically and published over a span of years. For that reason, until the last volume was published (63 for the DNB up to 22 January 2001; 20 for the DAB to the end of 1935), no historical period could be completely covered until the last volume appeared. Those who died subsequently were added in future volumes in a period arrangement.

The DCB, it was decided, would publish in a period arrangement throughout, with volumes arranged chronologically, and with each volume covering a specific range of years with biographies arranged alphabetically. The volume in which a biography was to appear was determined by death date of the individual in question or, if that was unknown, the date of their last known activity. Volumes were to be of approximate equal size, with the span of time covered within each reducing as biographies moved into the 20th century.

A major drawback to the system was that few people likely would be aware of the death dates of many people and therefore would not know in which volume an individual's biography would be found. This was to be addressed by cumulative indexes and epitome volumes.

Some advantages to the period approach were practical ones – biographies more or less linked by time period would also bring together scholars specializing in those periods, thus making research, editing and cross-checking easier, and readers would not have to keep reacquainting themselves with the historical period the individuals lived in. Additionally, future revisions would be limited to the volumes in question and not the entire series.

The subjects of biographies were broad. While noteworthy Canadians born and resident in Canada and Canadians who made their reputations abroad were to be included, so were persons from other countries who made a contribution to Canadian life. A general rule was to exclude those persons who had not set foot in what is now Canada, even if their influence on Canada was great. As for those born outside of Canada, focus was to be given to their life in Canada.

A guide was issued for the writers of Volume I biographies, and repeated for subsequent volumes:

"The biography should be a fresh and scholarly treatment of the subject based upon reliable sources (where possible first-hand) precise and accurate in statements of fact, concise, but presented in attractive literary form.... the aim is to secure independent and original treatments and not mere compilations of preceding accounts."

The biographies themselves were to range from about 200 words to a maximum of 8,000 to 10,000 words. There would typically be several hundred contributors for each volume.

An additional feature, taking advantage of the period approach, was the inclusion of several historical essays to further establish the historical context of many of the subjects of the biographies. Future volumes would also include historical essays, but not all.

== Subsequent volumes published ==
Volume II, covering the years 1701 to 1740, appeared in 1969. Biographies of 578 individuals appeared within its pages.

David Hayne was now general editor, having replaced Brown who died suddenly during the preparation of Volume I; André Vachon directeur adjoint.

By this time, there had been an important development which would have the effect of dramatically altering the publication sequence. Canada's centennial was celebrated in 1967 and, accordingly, the government of Canada created the Centennial Commission, in part to promote historical awareness. One of the first acts of the commission was to award a grant to the DCB specifically towards biographical research in the years 1850 to 1900. As a result, in 1967 it was decided to start preparing volumes for the 19th century. Volume X, ranging from 1871 to 1880, was the first volume to be assembled, and it appeared in 1972 with the biographies of 574 people, many of whom were instrumental in the creation of Canada itself.

From this time forward, while the original sequence of volumes continued, a parallel sequence of volumes for the 19th century appeared as well.

In 1974, the fourth volume, Volume III, was published. The biographies of 550 individuals who died between the years 1741 and 1770 were featured. A period of long editorial stability was established as Francess G. Halpenny, who succeeded Hayne in 1969, would hold the position of general editor for 20 years. Jean Hamelin, who became directeur adjoint in 1973, would hold the French editorial reins until his death in 1998.

The second volume of the 19th century appeared in 1976: Volume IX. Some 524 biographies by 311 contributors ranged from 400 to 12,000 words in length, encompassing the years 1861 to 1870. It was decided then not to include an introductory historical essay as that would be more properly included in a broader summing up of the era in a later volume.

The sixth volume published, Volume IV, brought to completion the 18th century. Appearing in 1979, 504 biographies spanned the years 1771 to 1800. That same year, Volume I was reprinted with corrections. Volume II was also reprinted, with corrections, and the seventh volume appeared, both in 1982. Volume XI contained the biographies of 586 noteworthy Canadians who died between 1881 and 1890. A new feature was introduced in this volume: indexes by occupation and geography. This new feature was to be incorporated in new volumes and in reprints of previous volumes as well as separate indexes, one of which appeared in 1981 for Volumes I–IV.

Volume V soon followed, published in 1983. It ranged the years 1801 to 1820, with 502 biographies from 269 contributors. Then, three more volumes followed in 1985, 1987 and 1988 bringing a total of 11: Volume VIII (1851 to 1860) with 521 biographies; Volume VI (1821 to 1835) with 479 biographies; Volume VII (1836 to 1850) with 538 biographies.

Finally, in 1990, the twelfth volume appeared, completing the 19th century. The 597 biographies of Volume XII (1891 to 1900) brought a total of 6,520 biographies to the project as its first main phase drew to a close, and long-time general editor Halpenny retired. An index for these first twelve volumes soon appeared allowing readers to quickly access all 6,520 biographies and all the thousands of other individuals mentioned in those biographies.

=== Volumes on the 20th century ===
Volume XII of the DCB said that the first three volumes of the 20th century were in preparation: Volume XIII (1901–1910); Volume XIV (1911–1918); Volume XV (1919–1925). But when Volume XIII appeared in 1994, with Ramsay Cook as new general editor, the intervening years were described as "hav[ing] been among the most difficult in the history of this Canadian institution." Severe financial restraints were described and a more "modest" plan was announced, with each volume covering a decade instead of the shorter intervals previously planned for post-1910. An additional volume was said to be in preparation up to the end of 1940.

Nevertheless, Volume XIII continued in the tradition of past volumes, with 648 biographies by 438 contributors, covering the previously announced range of years of 1901 to 1910.

Volume XIV was published in 1998, and marked a dramatic superficial change: a colourful dust-jacket featuring images of some 52 prominent Canadians, a stark contrast to the modest tan covers of previous volumes which featured only text. The contents continued in the scholarly style of the past volumes, however, with 622 biographies of individuals for the years 1911 to 1920. The introduction suggested that the financial and staff pressures were "becoming more acute" but held out the hope that "funds from a wider variety of granting agencies" would permit the project to continue as planned.

Volume XV appeared in 2005, with a solemn tribute to Hamelin who had died in 1998, and an "au revoir" to Cook who completed his participation with the DCB upon publication of the volume. Réal Bélanger had since 1998 replaced Hamelin as directeur general adjoint, and John English has replaced Cook as General Editor.

The 619 biographies contained within would bring a total of 8,419 biographies spanning the years 1000 to 1930 to the project. And, as a sign of the rapidly changing means of communications the DCB was encountering, mention was made of the millennium project to distribute for free CD-ROMs of the contents of the first 14 volumes of the project to educational institutions and of the intellectual properties licensing agreement made with Library and Archives Canada in 2003 to make available on-line those same 14 volumes with some additional biographies afterwards. The on-line edition of the DCB now has incorporated the biographies of Volume XV, and includes about a dozen biographies of prominent Canadians who died between 1931 and 2000, including every prime minister who had died within that time period.

Mention was also made of the financial problems which were making work more difficult, but also of the efforts of many Canadian institutions, corporations, agencies and individuals who made the continuation of the project possible.

The DCB is preparing Volume XVI which will cover the years 1931 to 1940, and is in the research stages for additional volumes which will encompass the years 1941 to 1980. When this phase of production is complete, there will be more than 10,000 biographies.

== Book on Prime Ministers ==
In 2007, the DCB published Canada's Prime Ministers: Macdonald to Trudeau – Portraits from the Dictionary of Canadian Biography. The 15 biographies therein reproduced those biographies which had appeared in the various volumes of the DCB already published, supplemented by the biographies of the prime ministers who have died since 1930.

== Evaluations ==
The evaluations by professional historians have been overwhelmingly favourable. Halpenny emphasizes its use of "the insights of historical geography, sociology, anthropology, and literature," and notes that it responds to both the concerns of quantitative historians as well as scholars in the fields of minorities, labor, and women.

Regarding the Maritimes, the Dictionary says little about early Indigenous leadership, but, says Godfrey, effectively covers French missionaries, and illuminates Acadia's relationship to France and New France. Volumes IX and X deemphasize Acadians and Indigenous peoples, and focus mostly on politics as contests between elites. The treatment of Maritime economic and intellectual development suggests that the legendary mid-19th-century Golden Age was only a veneer.

== See also ==
- List of Canadian historians

National historic significance

- Events of National Historic Significance
- National Historic Sites of Canada
- Persons of National Historic Significance
