= Margaret Ormsby =

Canadian historian

Margaret Anchoretta Ormsby OBC (7 June 1909 – 2 November 1996) was a Canadian historian, particularly concerning the history of British Columbia. She was head of the Department of History at the University of British Columbia.

== Early life and education ==
Ormsby was born in Quesnel, British Columbia, in 1909, and raised in the Okanagan Valley. She enrolled at the University of British Columbia (UBC) in 1925, graduating with a Bachelor of Arts in 1929, and a Master of Arts in 1931, both in History. While pursuing her PhD at Bryn Mawr College in Pennsylvania she interrupted those studies to work as a teaching assistant in history at UBC, then graduated from Bryn Mawr in 1936.

== Career ==
Ormsby taught in the United States for the next three years, at a girls high school. She then became a lecturer at McMaster University in 1940, returning to teach at UBC in 1943. In 1955 she was appointed Professor and in 1965 became head of the university's Department of History, a position she held until her retirement in 1974.

Ormsby was chair of the Historic Sites and Monuments Board of Canada from 1960 to 1967. She received honorary doctorates from the University of Victoria and Simon Fraser University as well as UBC, and holds the Insignia of the Order of British Columbia.

During her career she wrote extensively about the history and political development of British Columbia. In 1976 she was editor of the book A Pioneer Gentle Woman in British Columbia: the Recollections of Susan Allison.

Ormsby's 1958 book, British Columbia: A History, provided a framework for both timeline and causation of historical events in British Columbia's past. The book has been used as a resource by many historians and teachers. It was published in 1958 and was republished four times. Although the book is more than 60 years old, it is still held in more than 350 libraries in 2018. Ormsby posited a series of propositions that sought to explain the ongoing pull between maritime and continental forces; the opposition between a hierarchical model of society represented by the Hudson's Bay Company and colonial officials, and the more egalitarian ideas of English and Canadian settlers; and regional tensions between Vancouver Island and mainland, metropolitan Vancouver and the hinterland interior. Ormsby died in Vernon in 1996.

== Bibliography ==
She completed her MA thesis, “A Study of the Okanagan Valley of British Columbia” (1931) at University of British Columbia and her PhD thesis at Bryn Mawr College, The relations between British Columbia and the Dominion of Canada, 1871-1885 (1937).

She published in Pacific Historical Review, BC Historical News, BC Studies, British Columbia Historical Quarterly, The Journal of Economic History, The Canadian Historical Review, and Agricultural History.

Her books include:

- Ormsby, Margaret Anchoretta (1958). British Columbia: A History. Vancouver: MacMillan Company of Canada. - Total pages: 558 commemorating the centennial of the designation of B.C. as a crown colony.
- A Pioneer Gentle Woman in British Columbia: the Recollections of Susan Allison (1976) (see John Fall Allison)
- Coldstream - Nulli Secundus (1990)

== See also ==
- List of Canadian historians
