= Wendy Mitchinson =

Canadian historian

Wendy Mitchinson (1947-2021) was a Canadian historian who helped pioneer the study of women's history in Canada. As a member of the first major cohort of historians researching Canadian women's history, she co-authored the field's first comprehensive study on women called, Canadian Women: A History (1988), alongside Naomi Black, Alison Prentice, Gail Cuthbert Brandt, Paula Bourne, and Beth Light.

Mitchinson spent much of her career at the University of Waterloo, where she joined with tenure in 1985. She served as the Canada Research Chair in Gender and Medical history from 2006 to 2013. and continuing as professor emerita after her 2013 retirement. Her research focused heavily on the history of medicine and women's health, producing notable works including The Nature of Their Bodies (1991), Giving Birth in Canada 1900–1950 (2002), Body Failure : Medical Views of Women 1900-1950 (2013) and Fighting Fat: Canada 1920–1980 (2018). For her scholarship in medical history, she was twice awarded the Royal Society of Canada's Jason A. Hannah Medal.

Early Life

Mitchinson grew up in North York, Ontario, where she attended Bannockburn Public School before transferring to Ledbury Park Junior High. In her autobiographical essay, "No One Becomes a Feminist to Be Appreciated," Mitchinson recalled that the transition between schools encouraged her to work harder academically, resulting in improved grades. Despite her academic success, she expressed discomfort with the social categorization of students according to their abilities and interests. She later reflected that these experiences contributed to her awareness of the expectations placed upon individuals within society. Although uncertain about her future career, Mitchinson recalled that her parents supported her pursuit of higher education. She also expressed an early desire to pursue a professional career, recalling that when a high school counsellor suggested nursing, she responded that she would rather become a doctor.

Education and Early Academic Influences

Mitchinson attended York University from the late 1960s to the mid-1970s, where she earned an honours bachelor's degree, a master's degree, and a PhD. After enrolling at York University, Mitchinson initially considered pursuing a career in history but became discouraged by her early experiences in European history courses. However, a Canadian history course taught by Jack Granatstein renewed her interest in the discipline.

During her fourth year, Mitchinson developed an interest in Canadian nationalism, conducting primary-source research at the National Archives of Canada under the supervision of Paul Stevens. Her subsequent studies under Ramsay Cook introduced her to the history of nineteenth-century women's reform organizations. Influenced by the growing feminist movement of the late 1960s and early 1970s, she began investigating women's historical experiences.

In her autobiographical essay,"No One Becomes a Feminist to Be Appreciated," Mitchinson recalled encountering dismissive attitudes toward women's history throughout her personal and professional life, including suggestions that women had little history worth studying.

Academic Career

While completing her doctoral studies at York University, Mitchinson was invited by Ramsay Cook to collaborate on a collection of primary sources concerning Canadian women. Their resulting publication, The Proper Sphere: Woman's Place in Canadian Society (1976), represented an early contribution to the emerging field of Canadian women's history.

During the early stages of her academic career, Mitchinson taught at Mount Saint Vincent University in Halifax, Canada before joining the University of Windsor. She later recalled encountering gender discrimination when purchasing a home in Halifax, Canada, where a bank considered only half of her salary toward mortgage qualification because of concerns that she might leave employment to have children.

After eight years at the University of Windsor, Mitchinson accepted a position at the University of Waterloo in 1985. She was attracted by opportunities to supervise doctoral students, work within a larger history department, and continue her academic research. During her tenure at Waterloo, she held scholarly residencies at the Rockefeller Study Center in Bellagio, Italy (1996), the Valparaiso Foundation in Mojácar, Spain (1998), and the Bogliasco Foundation in Bogliasco, Italy (2007).

Research and Publications

Mitchinson's research focused primarily on Canadian women's history, particularly the relationship between gender, medicine, and societal perceptions of women's bodies. Her early scholarship examined nineteenth-century women's reform movements, contributing to the emerging field of Canadian women's history. Alongside Ramsay Cook, she co-authored The Proper Sphere: Woman's Place in Canadian Society (1976), a collection of historical sources examining women's roles and experiences in Canadian society.

She later contributed to Canadian Women: A History (1988), which examined women's experiences across four major periods of Canadian history, from the preindustrial era to the adoption of the Canadian Charter of Rights and Freedoms in 1982. This addressed the challenges of constructing a comprehensive history of Canadian women across the country's diverse regional, cultural, ethnic, and economic circumstances. In a scholarly review, the collaborative work was described as a successful attempt to address these complexities, highlighting its contribution to the study of Canadian women's history.

InThe Nature of Their Bodies: Women and Their Doctors in Victorian Canada (1991), Mitchinson examined how nineteenth-century Canadian medical professionals interpreted women's health through prevailing assumptions about biological differences between men and women. Her research also investigated the emergence of gynaecology and obstetrics as medical specialties and the influence women themselves exercised over changing treatment practices. In a review, historian Olive Banks emphasized Mitchinson's examination of how medical professionals reinforced traditional gender roles through biological assumptions, while also recognizing women's ability to influence medical practices, particularly the adoption of anaesthesia during childbirth. Although Banks praised the study's extensive historical detail, she noted that its specialized medical terminology could make it less accessible to general readers.

Continuing her examination of women's medical history, Mitchinson's Body Failure: Medical Views of Women, 1900–1950 (2013) investigated how Canadian medical professionals understood and treated women's bodies during the first half of the twentieth century. Drawing on Canadian medical journals, textbooks used in medical education, public health publications, patient records, hospital reports, and interviews with former patients, Mitchinson examined medical interpretations of puberty, menstruation, sexuality, marriage, motherhood, and illness. Her research explored how prevailing gender expectations influenced medical knowledge and treatment practices while also recognizing the physical realities of women's health. Mitchinson emphasized this distinction, arguing that "The material body is more than gender" (pg. 21).

In Giving Birth in Canada, 1900–1950 (2002), Mitchinson investigated the transformation of childbirth in Canada as physicians assumed greater responsibility for maternal care. Using historical medical records, contemporary publications, and personal accounts, she explored how developments in medicine influenced pregnancy, delivery, and women's relationships with healthcare providers. Her study also acknowledged differences between Indigenous and Western approaches to childbirth. Historian Cynthia Comacchio recognized Mitchinson's contribution to reconsidering established feminist interpretations of medical authority, particularly by questioning the assumption that greater physician involvement necessarily diminished women's control over their birthing experiences.

Historiographical Legacy

Mitchinson's examination of childbirth and medical authority contributed to broader historiographical discussions concerning the relationship between gender, medical intervention, and women's experiences. Whitney Wood’s Shifting Understandings of Labour Pain in Canadian Medical History (2018) further investigates how physicians' changing interpretations of labour pain influenced obstetrical practices during the late nineteenth and early twentieth centuries. By examining the relationship between medical authority, pain management, and women's experiences, Wood's research contributes to the historical discussion of gender and childbirth explored in Mitchinson's scholarship.

Beyond her publications, Mitchinson contributed to historical scholarship through collaborative research, academic supervision, and editorial positions, including co-editorships of the Canadian Historical Review (2001–2004) and the Journal of the Canadian Historical Association (2006–2008).

Awards

She was awarded two Royal Society of Canada Jason A. Hannah medals for publication in the history of medicine. In 2013, she earned University of Waterloo's Award of Excellence in Graduate Supervision. She also received a YWCA Woman of Distinction Award for her work on Canadian Women: A History (1988).

== See also ==
- List of University of Waterloo people

== Selected bibliography ==
- "H. B. Atlee on Obstetrics and Gynaecology: A Representative and Singular Voice in 20th Century Canadian Medicine," Acadiensis 32, 2 (Spring 2003): 1-28.
- "Giving Birth in Canada, 1900-1950." (Toronto: University of Toronto Press, 2002).
- "The Impact of Feminism on the Research and Writing of Medical History: A Personal View," Atlantis 25..2 (Spring/Summer 2001): 93-100.
- "The Sometimes Uncertain World of Canadian Obstetrics, 1900 to 1950," The Canadian Bulletin of Medical History, 17, 1-2 (2000): 103-208.
- "On the Case: Explorations in Social History", with Franca Iacovetta (Toronto: University of Toronto Press ss1998).
- "The nature of their bodies: women and their doctors in Victorian Canada" (Toronto: University of Toronto Press, 1991)
- "Essays in the history of Canadian medicine", with Janice P. Dickin (Toronto: McClelland and Stewart, 1988)
- "Canadian Women: a History" with Alison Prentice, Paula Bourne, Gail Cuthbert Brandt, Beth Light, and Naomi Black. (Harcourt Brace Jovanovich, 1988)
