= James Axtell =

American historian (1941–2023)

- Born: December 20, 1941; Endicott, New York, U.S.
- Died: August 29, 2023 (aged 81); Williamsburg, Virginia, U.S.
- Spouse: Susan Hallas (m. 1966; died 2023)

Academic background
- Education: Yale University (BA); University of Cambridge (PhD)
- Thesis: The Educational Writings of John Locke (1967)
- Doctoral advisor: Peter Laslett

Academic work
- Discipline: History
- Institutions: Yale University; Sarah Lawrence College; College of William and Mary
- Doctoral students: Melanie Perreault

James Lewis Axtell (December 20, 1941 – August 29, 2023) was an American historian whose interests ranged from cultural contact in colonial North America and American Indian society to the modern university and the history of higher education. He was the William R. Kenan, Jr. Professor of Humanities at the College of William and Mary in Williamsburg, Virginia, where he taught for three decades.

Axtell was regarded as a leading scholarly authority on Indian-Colonial relations in North America. He was the recipient of a Guggenheim Fellowship in 1981 (the first ever awarded to a member of the William & Mary faculty), the Commonwealth of Virginia's Outstanding Faculty Award in 1988. He was elected a Fellow of the American Academy of Arts and Sciences in 2004.

== Early life ==
Axtell was born in Endicott, New York on December 20, 1941 to Laura England and Arthur James Axtell, who together operated a small public accounting firm. His parents divorced in 1946, after which he moved with his father to his paternal grandparents' small farm in Sidney, New York. In 1948, Axtell's father married Mildred Lunn, a former schoolteacher. Axtell subsequently grew up with an adopted stepbrother and later a half-brother. Meanwhile, Axtell's mother, who had taken his younger brother, remarried and relocated to Phoenix, Arizona.

In Sidney, Axtell attended Sidney Central High School, graduating in 1959.

== Education ==
=== Yale University ===
Axtell was recruited to Yale University to play basketball but switched to track and field as a freshman. He set school records in the indoor long-jump and outdoor triple-jump before graduating in 1963. He attended the Oxford International Summer School the year before his graduation.

=== University of Cambridge ===
After leaving Yale, Axtell moved to the United Kingdom to pursue a PhD at the University of Cambridge under the supervision of Peter Laslett, the historian and political theorist whose 1960 critical edition of Locke's Two Treatises of Government had established the field of contextual Locke scholarship.

At Cambridge, Axtell once again participated in athletics, breaking the university's long-jump record and a 41-year-old British Universities long-jump record that had been held by Harold Abrahams—the British sprinter depicted in the 1981 film Chariots of Fire. Axtell also landed a spot on the All-England university basketball team. Axtell later claimed he had finished his dissertation in only two years to avoid having to guard first-team All-American and Rhodes Scholar Bill Bradley on the Oxford team.

Axtell earned his PhD in 1967, and his dissertation on “The Educational Writings of John Locke” was published the following year by Cambridge University Press. An anonymous reviewer in the Times Literary Supplement called it the "definitive edition" of Locke's writing on education.

== Academic career ==
=== Harvard and Yale: 1966–1972 ===
After a brief postdoctoral fellowship at Harvard University, Axtell joined the faculty at Yale University as an Assistant Professor of History. He spent six years in New Haven, departing just before review of his tenure case.

=== Sarah Lawrence College and Northwestern University: 1972–1978 ===
Axtell managed to secure a position at Sarah Lawrence College after leaving Yale. He spent three productive years in Bronxville before he was allegedly told that he "would be happier at a large research university" and released.

Adrift, Axtell relocated to Chicago and spent a year as a scholar-in-residence at the Newberry Library. For 1977-1978, he also managed to land a one-year visiting professorship at Northwestern University.

=== College of William & Mary: 1978–2008 ===
Axtell's period in the wilderness came to an end with a permanent appointment at the College of William & Mary. The goodness of the fit was undeniable within his first few years in Williamsburg: in 1981, he became the first William & Mary faculty member to receive a Guggenheim Fellowship. The decade witnessed Axtell become an eminent historian. His 1985 book, The Invasion Within: The Contest of Cultures in Colonial North America won the Gilbert Chinard Prize, the Erminie Wheeler-Voegelin Prize, and the Albert B. Corey Prize. In 1988, he received the Commonwealth of Virginia's Outstanding Faculty Award in 1988.

== Scholarship ==
=== Ethnohistory and Colonial North America ===
Axtell's most notable scholarly contribution lay in the analysis of cultural contact and conflict between European colonizers and Indigenous peoples. The Invasion Within established him as one of the leading authorities on the ethnohistory of colonial North America.

=== History of Higher Education ===
While he developed an international reputation for his ethnohistorical work, Axtell also wrote extensively on the history of the modern university. His books in this area examined education in colonial New England, the history of Princeton university, and "the pleasures of academe."

== Personal life ==
Axtell met his future wife, Susan Hallas, on a blind date arranged during his collegiate years at Yale. They married and had two sons. The couple made a habit of spending a few weeks each year at Otter Cliffs on Mount Desert Island, Maine.

== Books ==
- James Axtell (January 1968). The Educational Writings of John Locke: A Critical Edition. Cambridge University Press. ISBN 0-521-04073-6.
- James Axtell (January 1976). The School upon a Hill: Education and Society in Colonial New England. Yale University Press. ISBN 0-300-01723-5.
- James Axtell and James P. Ronda (January 1978). Indian Missions: A Critical Bibliography. Indiana University Press-The Newberry Library. ISBN 0-253-32978-7.
- James Axtell (February 1981). The Indian Peoples of Eastern America: A Documentary History of the Sexes. Oxford University Press. ISBN 0-19-502741-8.
- James Axtell (January 1982). The European and the Indian: Essays in the Ethnohistory of Colonial North America. Oxford University Press. ISBN 0-19-502904-6.
- James Axtell (January 1986). The Invasion Within: The Contest of Cultures in Colonial North America. Oxford University Press. ISBN 0-19-504154-2.: History Book Club; Gilbert Chinard Prize, Society for French Historical Studies, 1985; Erminie Wheeler-Voegelin Prize, American Society for Ethnohistory, 1986; Albert B. Corey Prize, American Historical Association-Canadian Historical Association, 1986
- James Axtell (1988). After Columbus: Essays in the Ethnohistory of Colonial North America. Oxford University Press. ISBN 0-19-505376-1.
- James Axtell (January 1992). Beyond 1492: Encounters in Colonial North America. Oxford University Press. ISBN 0-19-506838-6.
- James Axtell (July 1997). The Indians' New South: Cultural Change in the Colonial Southeast. Louisiana State University Press. ISBN 0-8071-2172-X.
- James Axtell (September 1998). The Pleasures of Academe: A Celebration & Defense of Higher Education. University of Nebraska Press. ISBN 0-8032-1049-3.
- James Axtell (August 2000). Natives and Newcomers: The Cultural Origins of North America. Oxford University Press. ISBN 0-19-513771-X.
- James Axtell (April 2006). The Making of Princeton University: Woodrow Wilson to the Present. Princeton University Press. ISBN 0-691-12686-0.
- Wisdom′s Workshop. The Rise of the Modern University. Princeton University Press, Princeton, New Jersey 2016, ISBN 978-1-4008-8042-3.
