= Kenneth Bourne =

British historian

Kenneth Bourne, FBA, FRHistS (17 March 1930 – 13 December 1992) was a British historian. A specialist of 19th-century British foreign policy, he was Professor of International History at the London School of Economics from 1976 until his death. He was elected to the American Philosophical Society in 1992.

== Biography ==
The son of Clarence Arthur Bourne and Doris (née English), Bourne was educated at Southend High School, the University College of the South West of England, and the London School of Economics. His book, Britain and the balance of power in North America, 1815–1908 won the Albert B. Corey Prize, awarded jointly by the American Historical Association and Canadian Historical Association, in 1969.

== Publications ==
- Britain and the balance of power in North America, 1815–1908 (Longmans, London, 1967);
- The foreign policy of Victorian England (Clarendon Press, Oxford, 1970);
- (editor, with D. C. Watt) Studies in International History (Longmans, London, 1967);
- (editor) The Horner papers: selections from the letters and miscellaneous writings of Francis Horner, MP, 1795–1817 (Edinburgh University Press, 1994);
- (editor) The blackmailing of the Chancellor: some intimate and hitherto unpublished letters from Harriet Wilson to her friend Henry Brougham, Lord Chancellor of England (Lemon Tree Press, London, 1975);
- (editor) The letters of the third Viscount Palmerston to Laurence and Elizabeth Sullivan, 1804–1863 (Royal Historical Society, London, 1979);
- Palmerston; the early years (covers the years 1784–1841) (Allen Lane, London, 1982);
- (editor, with D. C. Watt) British Documents on Foreign Affairs, 1983–
