= Official History of the Canadian Army in the Second World War =

Canadian 3-volume history series

- Author: Colonel Charles Perry Stacey; Lieutenant Colonel G. W. L. Nicholson
- Language: English
- Subject: Military history of Canada in World War II
- Genre: Military history
- Publisher: Authority of the Minister of National Defence
- Publication date: 1955–1960
- Publication place: Canada
- Preceded by: Official History of the Canadian Army in the First World War: Canadian Expeditionary Force, 1914-1919
- Followed by: Official History of the Canadian Army in Korea: Strange Battleground

The Official History of the Canadian Army in the Second World War was a three volume set of books, based on the wartime work of the Historical Section of the General Staff. The Canadian Army had a dedicated set of officers in the Second World War who studied and recorded various facets of wartime history for posterity.

During the war, Colonel Charles Perry Stacey headed the overseas effort of chronicling the history of the army, and produced a large number of reports. These reports, known as "CMHQ Reports" are largely available in electronic form from the Directorate of History and Heritage.

Some historical information was also compiled in book form during the war, and some introductory volumes were released soon after the war.

Canada's Battle In Normandy was released in 1946. Authored by Colonel Stacey, the book was a 159-page look at Canada's experiences in the Battle of Normandy from the perspective of the Canadian Army.

In 1948, The Canadian Army 1939-1945: A Historical Summary was published. The book was described in Stacey's own words in his autobiography, A Date With History:

I may as well describe the book. I called it simply The Canadian Army, 1939-1945. It amounted to just over 350 printed pages, with a dozen illustrations in colour (reproductions of pictures by our war artists), and numerous maps. In a preliminary work of this sort documentation seemed unnecessary, though I noted in the preface that in many cases "the sources of quotations and statements made are identified in the text." [...] Gerry Nicholson and Murray Hunter drafted portions of the text, Gerry the latter part of the story of the Italian Campaign and Murray part of that dealing with North-West Europe. As we carefully explained to the reader, the book was necessarily an interim report, "a Summary, not a History." My tattered old office copy of it is pockmarked with emendations, additions and corrections, particularly where statistics are concerned. Nevertheless, I think, the book has not worn too badly, and while the person who wants a precise account of the Canadian army in the Second World War should read the three-volume history which we produced later, the old Summary still affords a fairly satisfactory bird's-eye view of the struggle and the achievement.

The first of the three volume Official History did not appear in print until 1955 at the earliest. This was not unusual, in as an Official History of the First World War had also been many years in coming. Though the first of a projected eight volumes by Colonel Duguid first saw print in 1938, 20 years after the Armistice, the remaining 7 volumes were never completed. G. W. L. Nicholson published a one-volume Official History in 1964. The Royal Canadian Air Force's official Second World War history was not published until the 1990s. In Stacey's words:

...at least no one can take away from us the fact that we did publish a comprehensive short history of the Canadian army's part in the affair just three years after the last shot in Europe. If more of our wartime stable of well-qualified historians had stayed on after the shooting stopped, we could have achieved our final goal much sooner. As it was, I felt, rightly or wrongly, that, while we had a number of excellent researchers in our postwar team, only Gerry Nicholson and I were equal to the task of writing a volume for publication. The early volumes of the army history proper also ran into political obstruction, and this was one important reason for the delay in publication.

== Volume I ==
Official History of the Canadian Army in the Second World War: Volume I. Six Years of War: The Army in Canada, Britain and the Pacific appeared in print in 1955. Written by Colonel Stacey, the book was 629 pages in length, profusely illustrated with charts, photos, map and sketches, with ten appendices, a glossary of abbreviations, 50 pages of referenced footnotes, and a complete index. The title was evocative of the contents; a history of the Canadian Army's organization and training in Canada, in Britain, and in the Pacific was given in simple prose, well researched and balanced.

== Volume II ==
Official History of the Canadian Army in the Second World War: Volume II. The Canadians in Italy, 1943-1945 was first published on 15 Sep 1956 with a second, corrected edition appearing in Feb 1957. The book was written by Lieutenant Colonel G.W.L. Nicholson, deputy director of the Historical Section, General Staff. He had served with the Prince Albert and Battleford Volunteers before the war and with the Prince Albert Volunteers from its mobilization until 1943, when he joined the Historical Section, General Staff as Narrator, Pacific Command. In 1946 he served as Officer in Charge of the Historical Section at Canadian Military Headquarters, in Cockspur Street, London, and was appointed Deputy Director Historical Section, Army Headquarters in 1947. In the autumn of 1948 he travelled to Italy, and traced the path of the Canadians, from south-east Sicily to northern Italy; many of the photos in Volume II were taken by him, and he physically walked the ground of all actions in which Canadian forces in Italy took part.

== Volume III ==
Official History of the Canadian Army in the Second World War: Volume III. The Victory Campaign, The Operations in North-West Europe 1944–1945 appeared in print in 1960. It contained 770 pages, boosting the price on the dust jacket to the sum of $4.00 (up from the $3.50 tariff for Vol. I and Vol. II).

Stacey also wrote some companion volumes, including Arms, Men and Governments: The War Policies of Canada 1939-1945, a history of the political side of Canada's war effort, which finally saw print in 1970.
