= Alastair Sweeny =

Canadian publisher, historian, and author

Alastair Sweeny (born August 15, 1946) is a Canadian publisher, historian, and author.

== Early life ==
Born in Toronto, Ontario, he attended St. Andrew's College, and received a bachelor's degree from the Trinity College in the University of Toronto, and a Master of Letters and Doctor of Philosophy from Trinity College Dublin.

== Career ==
Sweeny has managed research programs, produced reference and learning materials, and consulted with many private and public sector organizations, including as an adviser to the Canadian government's Task Force on National Unity (the Pepin-Robarts Commission), Library and Archives Canada, Parks Canada, Federation of Saskatchewan Indian Nations, National Indian Veterans Association, Assembly of First Nations, Canadian Heritage, eLibrary ProQuest, Nelson Thomson Learning, Quebecor Media, Electric Library Canada and CanWest Global.

In 1989, he produced Canadisk, Canada's first multimedia CD-ROM, as a joint venture with Encyclopædia Britannica. In the 1990s, he developed learning materials for Apple Computer's eWorld online service, and produced the original Encarta Book of Quotations (1999) with Microsoft Inc. and Bloomsbury Publishing, London. In the 1990s, he helped get Canada's SchoolNet under way, and developed the On This Day in Canadian History online service for Bell Globemedia.

Sweeny has produced and written corporate history for a number of Canadian companies, including Investors Group, Alberta Energy Company (now Encana), Magna International and Gendis, Inc. He has done background research for Canadian authors such as W. L. Morton (research for a biography of Lord Strathcona), Peter C. Newman (Hudson's Bay Company series background history), Richard Gwyn (The 49th Paradox: Canada in North America), Pierre Berton (The Promised Land) and Jeffrey Simpson (Spoils of Power). He is author of several books, including a biography of Sir George-Étienne Cartier (1976) and CanQuiz (2002). His "business biography" of the BlackBerry, BlackBerry Planet, was published by John Wiley Canada Ltd in September 2009, and his book on Canada's oilsands industry, Black Bonanza, was published by Wiley in April 2010. His book Fire Along the Frontier: Great Battles of the War of 1812 was published by Dundurn Press to mark the bicentennial of the War of 1812.

Sweeny is currently executive director of the non-profit educational foundation The Civics Channel, dedicated to research, teaching and learning in the areas of citizenship and society, politics, human rights and the justice system. He is co-author and producer of Civics Canada Online, as well as its print version, Civics Canada (2005), and the sponsored Canadawiki portal.

He is also Vice President of Northern Blue Publishing of Waterloo, Ontario, and co-author and producer of History of Canada Online (Canada's Digital History) and Canada's First People, a history of Canada's native and aboriginal nations.

== Bibliography ==
- George-Étienne Cartier: A Biography McClelland & Stewart., 1976 ISBN 0-7710-8363-7
- CanQuiz (Key Porter, 2002) ISBN 1-55263-415-9
- Civics Canada (2005) ISBN 0-9738025-0-2
- Canada's First People (2006) ISBN 0-9780389-0-8
- BlackBerry Planet (2009) ISBN 0-470-15940-5
- Black Bonanza (2010) ISBN 0-470-16138-8
- Fire Along the Frontier: Great Battles of the War of 1812 (2012) ISBN 978-1-45970-433-6
- The Trackers: How to Manage Your Privacy on the Web. (2013, co-author) ISBN 978-0-97380-253-5
- The Founders of Canada (Canada's Digital History) (2013, co-author) ISBN 978-0-97380-252-8
- The Settlers of Canada (Canada's Digital History) (2013, co-author) ISBN 978-0-9738025-7-3
- Canada - The New Nation (Canada's Digital History) (2013, co-author) ISBN 978-1-92773-603-6
- Thomas Mackay: The Laird of Rideau Hall and the Founding of Ottawa (2022) ISBN 978-0-77663-679-5
