= Karen Dubinsky =

Canadian historian and professor

- Born: Karen Elaine Dubinsky; 15 October 1957; London, Ontario, Canada
- Died: 4 September 2026 (aged 68); Kingston, Ontario, Canada
- Spouse: Susan Belyea (m. 2026)
- Children: 1
- Awards: Albert B. Corey Prize (2000); Wilson Book Prize (2026)

Academic background
- Education: Carleton University (BA, MA); Queen's University (PhD)

Academic work
- Discipline: History
- Sub-discipline: Canadian history, history of sexuality, transnational history, Canadian-Cuban relations
- Institutions: Queen's University
- Notable works: The Second Greatest Disappointment: Honeymooning and Tourism at Niagara Falls; Babies Without Borders; Strangely, Friends: A History of Cuban-Canadian Encounters

Karen Elaine Dubinsky (15 October 1957 – 4 September 2026) was a Canadian historian and professor at Queen's University. Her research focused on Canadian history, gender and sexuality, international adoption, and relations between Canada and Cuba. She authored five books and co-edited five others. Her final book, Strangely, Friends: A History of Cuban-Canadian Encounters, received the 2026 Wilson Book Prize.

== Early life and education ==
Dubinsky was born in London, Ontario, on 15 October 1957, one of four children of lawyer Wallace V. Dubinsky and teacher Marguerite Wilson. She grew up in Thunder Bay, where her paternal grandparents, Ukrainian immigrants Ksenia and Sam Dubinsky, operated the International Café in Fort William. She had a sister, Kelly, and two brothers, David and Dennis.

Dubinsky became involved in student politics and feminism while attending university. In 1978, while working at the Northern Women's Centre in Thunder Bay, she conducted oral-history interviews with older women, including her paternal grandmother. The resulting recordings and transcripts, which documented women's lives and the history of her grandparents' International Café, were later deposited at the Lakehead University Archives.

In 1985, Dubinsky wrote Lament for a Patriarchy Lost? Anti-feminism, Anti-abortion, and R.E.A.L. Women in Canada for the Canadian Research Institute for the Advancement of Women. In March 1987, she helped organize a protest in Kingston against a speaking appearance by anti-feminist activist Gwen Landolt, using the name F.A.K.E., or Feminists for All Kinds of Equality.

Dubinsky earned a Bachelor of Arts degree in history from Carleton University in 1983 and a Master of Arts from its Institute of Canadian Studies in 1985. Her master's thesis, The Modern Chivalry: Women and the Knights of Labor in Ontario, 1880–1891, was passed with distinction. She completed a doctorate in history at Queen's University in 1991. Her doctoral dissertation, Improper Advances: Sexual Danger and Pleasure in Rural and Northern Ontario, 1880–1929, formed the basis of her first book.

== Academic career ==
Dubinsky began teaching in the Women's Studies Program at Queen's in 1988. From 1990 to 1991, she taught in the history department at the University of Toronto and in the Labour Studies Program at McMaster University. She remained an instructor at the University of Toronto during the 1991–1992 academic year and was an assistant professor at Brock University from 1992 to 1993.

She joined the Queen's University history department in July 1993 and was promoted to professor in July 2002. She received a joint appointment in Global Development Studies in 2010.

Dubinsky received the 1992 Canadian Historical Review Prize with Franca Iacovetta for their article about Angelina Napolitano. In 2000, she received the Albert B. Corey Prize, awarded jointly by the American Historical Association and Canadian Historical Association, for The Second Greatest Disappointment: Honeymooning and Tourism at Niagara Falls. She received the Queen's University Award for Excellence in Graduate Supervision in 2007 and, with Susan Lord, the Queen's Award for International Educational Innovation in 2016.

Over her 32 years at Queen's, Dubinsky taught thousands of students and supervised 47 master's students and 28 doctoral students. She also co-edited, with Franca Iacovetta, the University of Toronto Press series Gender and History, which had published 39 titles by the time of her death.

Dubinsky retired from Queen's in July 2025 and became a professor emerita of History and Global Development Studies.

== Work relating to Cuba ==
Dubinsky first visited Cuba in 1978 and lived in Havana intermittently beginning in 2004. Her research included Cuban music and culture and relationships between Cubans and Canadians.

With Susan Lord, Dubinsky developed Queen's University's Cuban Culture and Society program, a collaboration between Queen's and the University of Havana that lasted 15 years. More than 350 Queen's students travelled to Cuba through the program, while more than 20 Cuban scholars, musicians, filmmakers, artists and curators participated in activities at Queen's and in Kingston. Several Cuban participants subsequently undertook master's or doctoral studies at Queen's. The program received the Queen's Award for International Educational Innovation in 2016 and the Canadian Bureau for International Education's Panorama Award in 2021.

Dubinsky also researched music as a form of political expression in contemporary Cuba. With Caridad Cumaná and Xenia Reloba, she co-edited the Spanish-language Habáname: La Ciudad Musical de Carlos Varela and its English-language edition, My Havana: The Musical City of Carlos Varela. She later published Cuba Beyond the Beach: Stories of Life in Havana.

Dubinsky co-hosted Cuban Serenade, a 13-episode podcast about Cuban musicians in Canada, with Freddy Monasterio, and hosted the radio program Cuban Sounds in Canada on CFRC for two years. She also organized performances by Cuban musicians in Kingston and helped arrange honorary doctorates from Queen's for Cuban musicians Carlos Varela and Alex Cuba.

Her 2025 book, Strangely, Friends: A History of Cuban-Canadian Encounters, examined personal and cultural relationships between Cubans and Canadians, including exchanges involving educators, musicians, filmmakers, activists and international-development workers. It was shortlisted for the Canadian Historical Association's 2026 Best Scholarly Book in Canadian History Prize and received the 2026 Wilson Book Prize.

At the time of her death, Dubinsky was working on a book tentatively titled Cuban Roots on Canadian Soil: A History of Cuban Musicians in Canada.

== Personal life ==
Dubinsky met Susan Belyea in 1991. They lived in Kingston, Ontario, and had a son, Jordi Belyea-Dubinsky.

In July 2013, Dubinsky and Belyea received two anonymous letters containing homophobic slurs, threats of violence and demands that the family leave Kingston. They reported the letters to the Kingston Police, which investigated them as possible criminal harassment and uttering threats. Community members responded with rallies, telephone calls, flowers and messages of support. Dubinsky said that the family would not leave Kingston and spoke publicly about the incident because other same-sex couples might also have been targeted.

Dubinsky and Belyea married at their Kingston home on 17 August 2026, after having been together for approximately 35 years.

Dubinsky was diagnosed with an aggressive form of lung cancer and died at her home in Kingston on 4 September 2026, following a brief illness. She was 68. Queen's University lowered its campus flag to half-mast in her honour on 24 September.

== Selected works ==
=== Authored books ===
- Improper Advances: Rape and Heterosexual Conflict in Ontario, 1880–1929 (University of Chicago Press, 1993)
- The Second Greatest Disappointment: Honeymooning and Tourism at Niagara Falls (Between the Lines and Rutgers University Press, 1999)
- Babies Without Borders: Adoption and Migration Across the Americas (University of Toronto Press and New York University Press, 2010)
- Cuba Beyond the Beach: Stories of Life in Havana (Between the Lines, 2016)
- Strangely, Friends: A History of Cuban-Canadian Encounters (Between the Lines, 2025)

=== Edited books ===
- New World Coming: The Sixties and the Shaping of Global Consciousness (with Catherine Krull, Susan Lord, Sean Mills and Scott Rutherford, 2009)
- Habáname: La Ciudad Musical de Carlos Varela (with Caridad Cumaná and Xenia Reloba, 2013)
- My Havana: The Musical City of Carlos Varela (with Caridad Cumaná and Xenia Reloba, 2014)
- Within and Without the Nation: Transnational Canadian History (with Adele Perry and Henry Yu, 2015)
- Canada and the Third World: Overlapping Histories (with Sean Mills and Scott Rutherford, 2016)
