= Gustave Lanctot =

Canadian historian and archivist

Gustave Lanctot OC
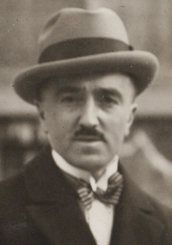
- Born: 5 July 1883; Saint-Constant, Quebec
- Died: 2 February 1975 (aged 91)
- Occupations: historian and archivist
- Awards: Order of Canada

Gustave Lanctot OC, QC, FRSC, also spelled Gustave Lanctôt, (5 July 1883 – 2 February 1975) was a Canadian historian and archivist.

Born in Saint-Constant, Quebec, he studied law at Université de Montréal and was called to the Quebec Bar in 1907. A Rhodes Scholar, he studied political science and history from 1909 to 1911 while at Oxford University. He was also a member of the Oxford Canadians ice hockey team. In 1912, he joined the National Archives of Canada. During World War I, he served in the Canadian Expeditionary Force.

After the war, he received a PhD from the Sorbonne and later returned to the National Archives eventually becoming Dominion Archivist from 1937 to 1948. He also taught at the University of Ottawa.

A historian, he wrote many books including L'Administration de la Nouvelle-France (1929), Le Canada d'hier et d'aujourd'hui (1934), Montréal au temps de la Nouvelle-France, 1642-1760 (1942), Trois ans de guerre, 1939-1942 (1943), L'Oeuvre de la France en Amérique du Nord (1951), Histoire du Canada (winner of the 1963 Governor General's Award for French language non-fiction), Le Canada et la Révolution américaine (1965, and winner of the inaugural Albert B. Corey Prize in 1967) and Montréal sous Maisonneuve, 1947-1965 (1966). He also was a historical advisor on eight Canadian films produced from 1961 to 1964.

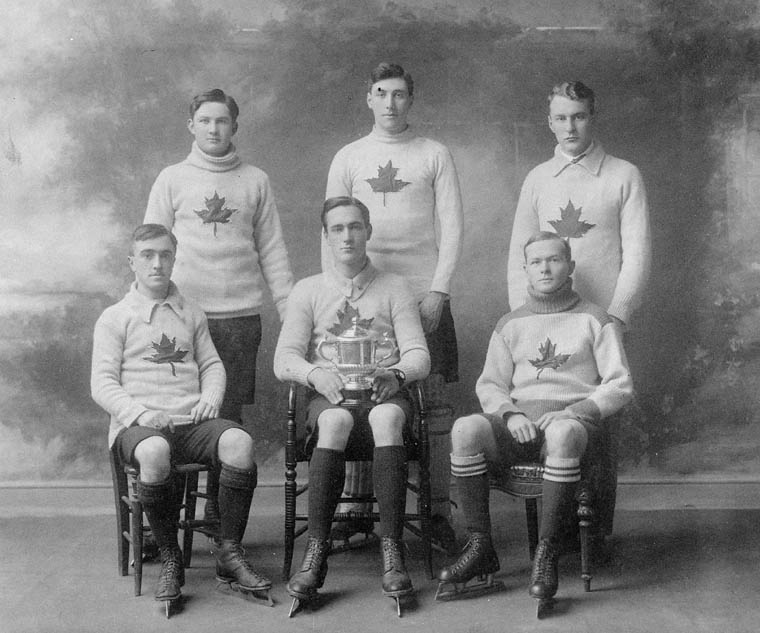
Gustave Lanctot, front row left, part of the Oxford Canadian Ice Hockey Team

He was made a Fellow of the Royal Society of Canada in 1926, was awarded the J. B. Tyrrell Historical Medal, and was its president from 1948 to 1949. On July 6, 1967, he was one of the first people to be made an Officer of the Order of Canada (then called a Service Medal). The citation read "Renowned historian whose "Histoire du Canada" marks the culmination of a life devoted to knowledge of Canada's past". He also was made a Knight of the Légion d'honneur.

== Order of Canada medal auction ==
In late 2006 and early 2007, Lanctot made the news concerning his Order of Canada medal which was put up for auction on eBay. It was later removed since the auction is against eBay rules. However, the auction appeared to proceed via e-mail.

Professional and academic associations
Preceded by Walter P. Thompson	President of the Royal Society of Canada; 1948–1949	Succeeded by Joseph Algernon Pearce
