= Robert H. Babcock =

American historian

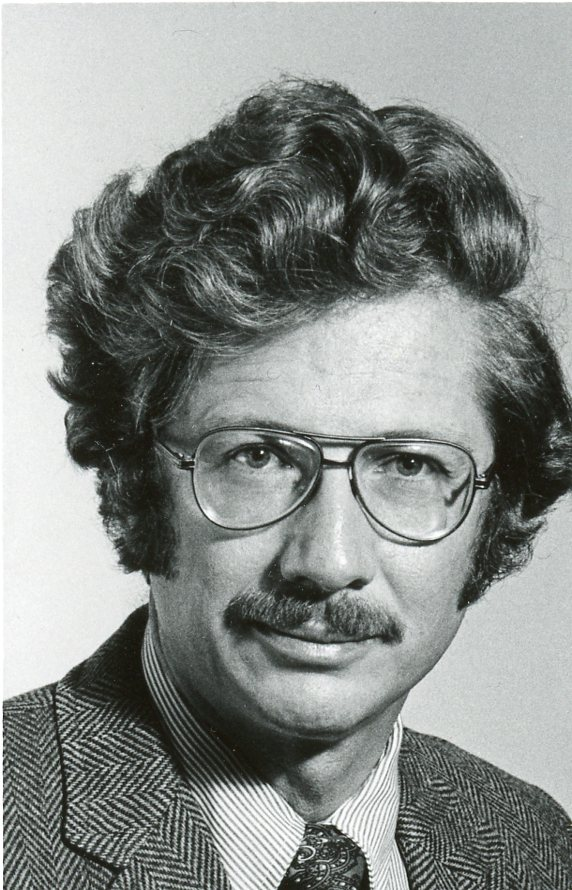
- Born: December 19, 1931; Cincinnati, Ohio, US
- Died: February 14, 2014 (aged 82)
- Awards: Albert B. Corey Prize (1976)

Academic background
- Education: University at Albany, SUNY; Duke University
- Doctoral advisor

Academic work
- Discipline: History
- Sub-discipline: Canadian and American labor history
- Institutions: Wells College; University of Maine

Robert Harper Babcock (December 19, 1931 – February 12, 2014) was an American historian of North American labor.

Born in Cincinnati, Ohio in 1931, to Harold Laverne Babcock and Elsie Elizabeth Harper Babcock, Babcock's father Harold lost his job in 1933 and he and his parents moved to his mother's hometown of Rochester, New York. He graduated from Irondequoit High School in suburban Irondequoit, New York in 1949 and studied Social Studies at the New York State College for Teachers at Albany. He graduated from Albany with a B.A. in 1953 and an M.A. in 1957. During this period, he was drafted and served two years in the U.S. Army but was not deployed to the ongoing Korean War. Babcock married Rosemary Kirby in June 1955 while still in the Army. From 1957 to 1966, Babcock taught history at Guilderland Central High School in suburban Albany. He completed his dissertation at Duke University. His first book, Gompers in Canada: A Study in American Continentalism before the First World War, was published by the University of Toronto Press in 1974 and was awarded the Albert B. Corey Prize by the American Historical Association and Canadian Historical Associations. In 1975, Babcock was hired by the University of Maine, where he stayed for the remainder of his career.

== Works ==
=== Books ===
- Babcock, Robert H. (1974). Gompers in Canada: A Study in American Continentalism Before the First World War. University of Toronto Press. ISBN 978-1-4426-3313-1.
- Babcock, Robert H. (2009). A History of Canadian Studies at the University of Maine. Orono, ME: Canadian-American Center. ISBN 978-1-882582-63-1.

=== Selected articles ===
- Babcock, Robert H. (1 March 1979). "Economic Development in Portland (me.) and Saint John (n.b.) During the Age of Iron and Steam, 1850–1914". American Review of Canadian Studies. 9 (1): 3–37. doi:10.1080/02722017909480871. ISSN 0272-2011.
- Babcock, Robert H. (1981). "A Note on the Toronto Printers' Strike, 1872". Labour / Le Travail. 7: 127–129. doi:10.2307/25140025. ISSN 0700-3862. JSTOR 25140025.
- Babcock, Robert H.; Ryan, T. J. (1981). "A Newfoundland Printer on the Tramp". Labour / Le Travail. 8/9: 261–267. doi:10.2307/25140080. ISSN 0700-3862. JSTOR 25140080.
- Babcock, Robert H. (1982). "The Saint John Street Railwaymen's Strike and Riot, 1914". Acadiensis. 11 (2): 3–27. ISSN 0044-5851. JSTOR 30302675.
- Babcock, Robert H. (1986). "A Jewish Immigrant in the Maritimes: The Memoirs of Max Vanger". Acadiensis. 16 (1): 136–148. ISSN 0044-5851. JSTOR 30302784.
- Babcock, Robert H. (1990). "Saint John Longshoremen during the Rise of Canada's Winter Port, 1895-1922". Labour / Le Travail. 25: 15–46. doi:10.2307/25143339. ISSN 0700-3862. JSTOR 25143339.
- Babcock, Robert H. (1990). "The Decline of Artisan Republicanism in Portland, Maine, 1825-1850". The New England Quarterly. 63 (1): 3–34. doi:10.2307/366058. ISSN 0028-4866. JSTOR 366058.
- Babcock, Robert H. (1 June 1994). ""Will you walk? Yes, we'll walk!": Popular support for a street railway strike in Portland, Maine". Labor History. 35 (3): 372–398. doi:10.1080/00236569400890231. ISSN 0023-656X.
