= Keith Matthews (footballer) =

Welsh footballer

Personal information
- Full name: John Keith Matthews
- Date of birth: 7 March 1934
- Place of birth: Wrexham, Wales
- Date of death: 2008 (aged 73–74)
- Place of death: Wrexham, Wales
- Position: Winger

Senior career*
Years	Team	Apps	(Gls)
- Llay United
1952–1955	Wrexham	9	(0)
- Blaenau Ffestiniog
- * Club domestic league appearances and goals

John Keith Matthews (7 March 1934 – 2008) was a Welsh professional footballer who played as a winger. He made appearances in the English Football League for Wrexham in the 1950s, and also played in the Welsh leagues for Llay United and Blaenau Ffestiniog.
