= Paula Bourne =

Canadian historian

- Born: Paula Therese O'Neill; 1941 (age 84–85); Liverpool, UK

Academic background
- Education: University of Leeds; University of Toronto

Paula Bourne is a Canadian historian and professional educator whose research, writing and teaching focuses on Canadian women's history, contemporary issues facing Canadian women, and gender issues and education.

== Background ==
Born Paula Therese O'Neill in Liverpool, UK in 1941, she holds undergraduate degrees in history and education from the University of Leeds, and an M.A. in education from the University of Toronto.

Bourne spent two years as a schoolteacher and lecturer in the UK before taking a one-year teaching position in Chicago, Illinois in 1965. She then spent a year as a research assistant at Chicago's Center for Urban Studies before beginning her long association with the Ontario Institute for Studies in Education (OISE) in 1967.

At OISE, Bourne began as a research officer. In 1984 she became a research associate, also acting as coordinator of OISE's Centre for Women's Studies in Education from 1989 to 1999. During that time, OISE became part of the University of Toronto. From 1999 to 2007, she taught as a senior lecturer in OISE's Teacher Education program and its graduate program. She was appointed head of the Centre for Women's Studies in Education at OISE in 1999, a position which she held until 2006. In 2002 she became a senior research associate. While at OISE Bourne was known for her course, Gender Equity in Schools and Classrooms, She also taught School and Society, a sociological overview of education.

Bourne's opinion is sought when issues of gender and education come to the fore in Canada.

Canadian Women: A History which she co-authored is called "A broad‐ranging scholarly feminist treatment" by The Oxford Encyclopedia of Women in World History. All three editions of the book, including the most recent 2011 one, have been/are used as texts at the university level. Bourne's early publication Women in Canadian Society was used in schools for many years.

Bourne has lectured and provided educational training on the history of Canadian women and gender equity in education both in Canada and internationally, including Pakistan (Aga Khan University); Japan (Ibaraki University, Kanagawa University); and Costa Rica (University of Costa Rica, San Juan).

== Ontario government curriculum resources ==
At the request of the Government of Ontario's Ontario Women's Directorate, Bourne developed curriculum resources to help teachers deal with violence in schools; developed materials to combat date and acquaintance rape on college and university campuses; and led an expert education panel which produced two handbooks and a DVD to help elementary teachers identify children in their classrooms who are or may be witnessing woman abuse at home. Teacher training based on the materials produced by this panel, entitled "Woman Abuse Affects Our Children" took place across Ontario including in many Aboriginal communities and under the auspices of the Elementary Teachers Federation of Ontario (ETFO) and the Ontario Native Education Counselling Association (ONECA).

== Selected bibliography ==
Books

- Canadian Women: A History, 3rd edition, Co-author with Gail Cuthbert Brandt, Naomi Black, Magda Fahrni (Toronto: Nelson Education, 2011). ISBN 0-17-650096-0. ISBN 978-0-17-650096-2.
- Women Teaching, Women Learning: Historical Perspectives, Co-editor with Elizabeth Smyth (Toronto: Inana Press, 2006.) ISBN 0973670932. ISBN 978-0973670936.
- Challenging Professions: Historical and Contemporary Perspectives on Women’s Professional Work, Co-editor with Elizabeth Smyth et al. (Toronto: University of Toronto Press, 1999).ISBN 0802081436. ISBN 978-0802081438.
- Canadian Women: A Reader, Co-editor with Wendy Mitchinson et al. (Toronto: Harcourt Brace and Company, 1996). ISBN 077473292X, ISBN 9780774732925.
- Canadian Women: A History, 2nd edition, Co-author with Alison Prentice et al. (Toronto: Harcourt Brace and Company, 1996). ISBN 0176174915. ISBN 978-0176174910.
- Feminism and Education: A Canadian Perspective, Co-editor with Phil Masters (Toronto: CWSE, OISE, 1994).
- Canadian Women’s Issues: Strong Voices, Co-author with Ruth Roach Pierson et al. (Toronto: James Lorimer Publishing, 1993). ISBN 1550284150. ISBN 978-1550284157.
- Canadian Women: A History, 1st edition, Co-author with Alison Prentice et al. (Toronto: Harcourt Brace Jovanovich, 1988). ISBN 0774731125. ISBN 978-0774731126.
- Women’s Paid and Unpaid Work: Historical and Contemporary Perspectives, Editor (Toronto: New Hogtown Press, 1985). ISBN 091994020X.
- Women in Canadian Society, Author (Toronto: OISE Press, 1978).

== Awards ==
Toronto YWCA Woman of Distinction Special Award] (1991) for co-authoring Canadian Women: A History, 1st edition.
