= Craig Heron =

Canadian social historian and public intellectual

Craig Heron is a Canadian social historian and public intellectual with a broad interest in labour and cultural history. A former president of the Canadian Historical Association, he is a professor emeritus at York University.

== Background ==
Craig Heron grew up in the 1950s in a working-class household in suburban Toronto. The first in his family to go to university, he graduated with an Honours B.A. in Modern History from the University of Toronto in 1970 and completed an M.A. in history at the same institution in 1973. He was employed by the Ontario Federation of Students and the Dictionary of Canadian Biography before undertaking an M.A. in Comparative Labour History at the University of Warwick in England. On his return to Canada in 1976, he joined the active social history group at Dalhousie University, where he completed his Ph.D. in 1981. He began teaching at York University in 1982 and was appointed to the Division of Social Science and the Department of History at York University in 1984, where he served as a professor until his formal retirement. His presidential address to the Canadian Historical Association, delivered in 2009, is a notable review of the historical context of his own family background in post-1945 Canada.

== Research and Publishing ==
Most of Heron's research, teaching and writing has focused on Canadian labour and social history. Like his contemporaries, such as Gregory Kealey, Heron was influenced by the work of historians such as E.P. Thompson, E.J. Hobsbawm, Herbert Gutman, David Montgomery and others outside Canada who promoted a "new labour history" to address the multiple dimensions of the working-class experience. Heron's first major book, Working in Steel: The Early Years in Canada, 1883–1935, drew on themes from the history of technology and business and urban, ethnic and labour history. With sociologist Robert Storey of McMaster University, he co-edited a collection of workplace studies, On the Job: Confronting the Labour Process in Canada, with subjects ranging from early printers and railway workers to fast food and assembly line workers. Another edited collection, The Workers' Revolt in Canada, 1917-1925, shed new light on the range of labour unrest across Canada at the close of the First World War. Heron's subsequent books included The Workers' Festival: A History of Labour Day in Canada, co-authored with Steve Penfold, and Booze: A Distilled History. He also wrote a short popular history of the Canadian labour movement, which has gone through four editions. In 2015, he published Lunch-Bucket Lives: Remaking the Workers' City, an exploration of working-class life in Hamilton, Ontario in the early twentieth century. The book received awards from the Ontario Historical Society, the Canadian Historical Association and the Canadian Association for Work and Labour Studies. It was also chosen as the Book of the Year for 2015 by the International Labor History Association. Their citation described the book as "a tour de force of social and labor history, bringing an ultra-comprehensive analysis of labor, management, youth and families, gender tensions, ethnic and community contributions, within the economic dynamics of a Canadian city and its labor movement." His most recent book, published in 2018 under the title Working Lives: Essays in Canadian Working-Class History, is a collection of his articles in the field.

== Professional Activities ==
At York University, Heron taught courses at all levels and supervised more than twenty doctoral dissertations. Several of his students have become prominent academics, among them Adele Perry (University of Manitoba), Steven Penfold (University of Toronto) and Ian Milligan (University of Waterloo). In administrative work, Heron assisted in creating York's programs in Labour Studies and also in Public History. He served as chair of the Division of Social Science and also on the university Senate and on the executive of the York University Faculty Association. For the University of Toronto Press, he was editor of the series Themes in Canadian Social History. In 2006 he was elected vice-president of the Canadian Historical Association and then as president in 2007–09. For his service to the Association, he received the Queen's Diamond Jubilee Medal in 2012. Beyond the university, Heron has been active in the promotion of public history, a form of historical engagement he discussed in an influential article in 2000. For many years he was a member of the board of the Workers’ Arts and Heritage Centre, the workers' museum and cultural centre in Hamilton, Ontario, which he helped to establish in 1988. He also curated several exhibits and walking tours for them. He often consults on historical projects and speaks at public events held by museums, archives, unions and heritage organizations. Most recently, Heron has chaired the steering committee for the Toronto Workers’ History Project (TWHP).

== Recognition ==
In 2017, Heron was named a professor emeritus at York University. A retirement conference in his honour was held in May 2017, under the title "Scholarship, Activism, Public History: Celebration of the Work and Leadership of Craig Heron". The same year he also received the Lee Lorch Award from the Canadian Association of University Teachers in recognition of his distinguished career in teaching, research and service.

== Published books ==
Working Lives: Essays in Canadian Working-Class History (Toronto: University of Toronto Press, 2018).

Lunch-Bucket Lives: Remaking the Workers' City (Toronto: Between the Lines, 2015).

The Workers' Festival: A History of Labour Day in Canada (Toronto: University of Toronto Press, 2005). With Steve Penfold.

Booze: A Distilled History (Toronto: Between the Lines, 2003).

The Workers' Revolt in Canada, 1917-1925 (Toronto: University of Toronto Press 1998).

The Canadian Labour Movement: A Short History (Toronto: James Lorimer and Company, 1989; 2nd ed. 1996; 3rd ed. 2012).

Working in Steel: The Early Years in Canada, 1883-1935 (Toronto: McClelland and Stewart, 1988).

On the Job: Confronting the Labour Process in Canada (Montreal and Kingston: McGill‑Queen's University Press 1986). With Robert Storey.
