= Mark Sweeten Wade =

Canadian historian

Mark Sweeten Wade (November 23, 1858 – 1929) was a medical doctor and historian of early British Columbia history. A medical doctor at the Kamloops Home for Men in the 1920s, he was able to interview many veterans of the province's early gold rush, including many of the more famous names in the history of the Cariboo Road, the Cariboo Gold Rush and the Overlanders of 1862 led by Thomas McMicking. He also wrote on medical legislation and hospital policy in the province of British Columbia as well as a biography of explorer Alexander Mackenzie. His works have served as an important source of biographical and historical detail by later historians.

== Biography ==
He was born in Sunderland, County Durham, England on November 23, 1858. His parents were John Wade of Stockton-on-Tees and his mother was Mary Sweeten of Barnard Castle. After an education in British public schools (what would in North America be called private schools) and matriculated in the Faculty of Medicine at Durham University. He emigrated to Canada in 1881 and pursued further studies in medicine at Fort Wayne, Indiana and returning to Canada in 1882 was hired as a medical officer for the Canadian Pacific Railway survey with the party surveying the Qu'Appelle, Regina, Moose Jaw and Swift Current area. In the fall of that year he returned to school at the University of Toronto General Hospital, finishing in 1883. He returned to England for a short visit, then upon re-entry to Canada at Victoria, B.C. registered as a medical practitioner and took land in the Surrey area near his brother Edmund Wade, practicing there until 1884. He hired on with Andrew Onderdonk's construction operations for the Canadian Pacific Railway, then based in Spences Bridge and Savona. There he met Emma Uren, daughter of James Bottrell Uren, who ran the local hotel and also the ferry, on March 10, 1885. Upon the completion of the CPR he moved to Clinton and was the resident physician there until 1889.

In 1889 Wade went to San Francisco to study medicine at the University of California, San Francisco, returning to live in Victoria after graduation and practicing medicine there until 1895. During a major smallpox epidemic in 1892 he was appointed Chief Medical Officer of the province by Premier Theodore Davie. In 1895, he moved to Kamloops and open practice as an ear, nose and throat specialist in offices across from that city's Dominion Hotel. A growing interest in newspaper writing led to his appointment as Editor of the Inland Sentinel when that paper's editor and publisher, F.J. Deane, was elected as a Member of the Legislative Assembly of British Columbia for Yale-West (which Kamloops was in at the time) and needed to be freed up from his editorial activities to pursue politics in Victoria and around the riding. Although the provincial legislature as yet did not have political parties, both men were ardent Liberals and the newspaper espoused Liberal politics. In the same year he was appointed doctor for the Provincial Home for men and the local jail, and in 1899 he was appointed coroner and in 1900 elected vice-president of the Kamloops Liberal Association and also elected to the Board of Trade. Deane lost re-election in 1902 to F.J. Fulton and due to most such appointments in the province being from patronage, Wade also lost his position as jail doctor and coroner.

Deane bought the Nelson Miner in 1902 and renamed it the Nelson Daily News, with Wade also contributing to it as a writer. In 1904 Deane sold the Inland Sentinel to Wade, who continued publishing it as a small paper covering only local and district news. In 1910, he tied the paper into a wire service and expanded it to eight pages as a weekly, covering world news and little local news. Wade's activities on the Board of Trade and a group known as the 10,000 Club (which like others of its time sought to promote growth in the city to a population of 10,000), Wade engaged in an advertising campaign to draw industries to the city, promoting ventures such as a tourist hotel, steamboat service on the North Thompson River, a cannery, a creamery, a flour mill and a cold storage plant.. As part of his promotional zeal and in time for the Christmas sales market of 1907, Wade published The Thompson Country, which biographer Mary Gulliford notes was error-ridden and "had an air of carelessness. It was probably due to increased demand for advertising of the Kamloops district that caused the hurried job." Wade also took part in the city's negotiations with the Canadian National Railway concerning sites for stations and shops in the Kamloops area for that railway's expansion of a line to the Okanagan. Wade helped organized the memorial service for King Edward VII, held in the city's Riverside Park and was on the city's welcoming committee when Prime Minister Sir Wilfrid Laurier came to town. He sold the Sentinel in 1912 and was elected alderman in 1913, retiring from the position and touring Europe briefly in 1914, returning to serve as a member of the medical board examining new recruits for the Canadian Expeditionary Force.

During his lifetime Wade wrote two books other than The Thompson Country. Mackenzie of Canada: The Life and Adventurers of Alexander Mackenzie, Discoverer was the first biography ever published on the famous explorer. His The Overlanders of '62, which had been commissioned by the provincial government, was unfinished at the time of his death and was edited and published by provincial Archivist and Librarian John Hosie in 1932. His biographer summarizes

"It was said of Wade as a historian "no pains in research were too strenuous" and certainly The Overlanders displays this trait. He possessed every scrap of evidence on the Overlanders that was to be had in diaries and correspondence and by word of mouth. The book is very meticulous and a fascinating work."

Wade died in 1929 leaving his wife Emma and son M. Leighton; another son, Daryl Fred, had died in 1920 after operating as an auto mechanic in Kamloops from 1912 and serving in the war from 1916 onwards to its completion. M. Leighton earned a [Bachelor of Science|B.Sc.] from McGill University and was involved in construction of the Mt. Olie power plant near Kamloops in 1913 and later supervised construction of hydroelectric development at Adams Lake, also becoming superintendent of the East Kootenay Power Co. in 1930 and from 1934 onwards was in charge of the Kamloops area highway department.

== Bibliography ==
- Notes on medical legislation in British Columbia (s.n., 1981)
- The Cariboo Road (Haunted Bookshop, Victoria BC 1979)
- The Overlanders of '62 (publ. C. F. Banfield, printer to the King, 1931)
- The founding of Kamloops (publ. Inland Sentinel Press, 1912)
- Mackenzie of Canada (W. Blackwood & sons, Ltd., Edinburgh, 1927)
- The Thompson Country by Mark Sweeten Wade (Inland Sentinel Print., 1907) (click link to read on-line)

== See also ==
- List of Canadian historians
