= George Williams Brown =

Canadian historian and editor

George Williams Brown FRSC (1894–1963) was a Canadian historian and editor. He was born on April 3, 1894, in Glencoe, Middlesex County, Ontario, and died on October 19, 1963, in Ottawa, Ontario.

== Early life and education ==
The son of Charles William Brown, a Methodist and United Church of Canada minister, and Ida Rebecca Brown, he grew up in Southwestern Ontario, Saskatchewan and British Columbia. After graduating in history from Victoria College, University of Toronto in 1915, he joined the Canadian Army but was invalided out and taught for a year in a Dukhobor community in Saskatchewan. He re-enlisted as a Lieutenant in the Canadian Tanks Corps, but World War I ended before he saw active service. After the War he taught for a year in Saskatoon Collegiate Institute and then went to the University of Chicago, where he received a PhD in history in 1924.

== Career ==
=== Academic career ===
He taught for one year at the University of Michigan and then in 1925 joined the History Department at the University of Toronto, where he taught Canadian and American History. In 1959 he retired and became professor emeritus. From 1953 to 1954 he was Canadian visiting Commonwealth Fellow at the Royal Institute of International Affairs and the Institute of Commonwealth Studies, University of London. He served as president of the Canadian Historical Association (1943–44) and was elected a fellow of the Royal Society of Canada in 1945. He received an honorary doctorate from the University of British Columbia in 1952. A gold medal is presented annually in his name to the top graduating history student at Victoria College. A collection of Brown's papers, in particular with reference to his involvement with the Canadian Historical Review, is held in the York University Archives, Toronto.

=== Editorial career ===
Throughout his career Brown was active in promoting Canadian historical scholarship. He became associate editor of the Canadian Historical Review (CHR) in 1928 and was the editor of the CHR from 1930 to 1946, during which time he helped set its orientation towards the study of Canadian history. He also actively promoted the development of public archives in both the federal and the provincial governments across Canada, and he made this a priority during his term as President of the Canadian Historical Association. One of his collaborators in this effort was his brother-in-law, Arthur Silver Morton, an historian at the University of Saskatchewan who founded the Saskatchewan Historical Public Records Office, the forerunner of the Saskatchewan Archives Board. With Donald Creighton, the CHR associate editor, Brown conducted a survey of the state of Canadian historical scholarship in 1944 to mark the CHR's 25th anniversary. From 1946 to 1953 he continued his editorial work as general editor of the University of Toronto Press, which publishes the CHR and other scholarly publications.

=== Dictionary of Canadian Biography ===
In 1959, Brown became the founding general editor of the Dictionary of Canadian Biography (DCB), a position he held until his death in 1963. In setting up the DCB, he introduced two of its distinctive features. The first was to organize the volumes of biographies in chronological rather than alphabetical order. The most significant feature of the DCB was its establishment in 1961 as a partnership between the University of Toronto Press and Laval University Press, with identical volumes published simultaneously in English and French. This collaboration continues to the present day, and the DCB' has become one of the most significant scholarly undertakings in Canada. (For a more complete account of the founding of the DCB, see the article on the Dictionary of Canadian Biography and the memoirs of the then Publisher of the University of Toronto Press.) The first associate general editor of the DCB was the historian Marcel Trudel of Laval University. In addition to the organizational work of setting up the DCB, Brown was the general editor and Trudel the associate general editor of its first volume, which was published in 1966. He also co-authored, with Jacques Rousseau, an introductory article on "The Indians of North America."

== Research and publications ==
=== Scholarly research ===
Brown was an active scholar in his own right and a prolific writer. His most enduring academic interest was the emergence of Canada as a society and political entity, initially in North America and then in the wider world. He believed that Canadian history needed to be understood in its North American context. His early research interests were in the boundary and relationship between Canada and the United States and in the political, religious and social development of pre-Confederation Ontario, including the founding of Victoria College. Later he wrote extensively on Canada's growing role in the post-World War II international environment, reflecting the prominent role played by his generation in moving Canada to full independence and international stature.

=== Textbooks ===
He was well known as an author of high school textbooks - drawing on his early experience as a high school teacher - and books for general audiences about Canadian history and Canada's place in the world. His book Building the Canadian Nation was the grade 10 Canadian history text in Ontario and several other provinces for over 20 years and went through numerous editions, selling over 600,000 copies. He co-authored a version for middle school students: The Story of Canada (with Eleanor Harman and Marsh Jeanneret), which was also published in French as Notre Histoire (with Harman, Jeanneret and Charles Bilodeau). This was later revised and re-issued as a two-volume Canada in North America, covering the periods to 1800 and 1800–1901.

Building the Canadian Nation has been criticized for perpetuating stereotypes of French Canadians in their daily lives in New France. In this view, the stereotypes, which are traced back to the work of earlier scholars on New France and primary sources, have the effect of constructing French Canadians in the negative image of the contemporary (post-World War II) English Canadian, thus detaching them from the main narrative of Canadian history. In response, the passages in question were an effort to depict daily life in New France to students and to balance more traditional accounts that focus on leading historical figures and events. Brown's later publication of Notre Histoire with Charles Bilodeau, a respected Quebec historian, and his work as founding editor of the Dictionary of Canadian Biography, the leading collaborative effort in Canada between anglophone and francophone historians, are both reflections of his core belief that English and French Canada were founding partners.

Brown wrote several other textbooks and books of readings, including Readings in Canadian History (the first book of original source readings for high school students – part of a move towards more evidence-based teaching of Canadian history in schools) and Canadian Democracy in Action (a high school civics text), which was later revised as Canadians and Their Government (co-authored by Allen S. Merritt).

=== General interest books ===
Books of more general interest included Canada (an edited volume that was part of a series on members of the United Nations) and Canada in the Making (a collection of Brown's scholarly articles, with the title drawn from his presidential address to the Canadian Historical Association). With J. M. S. Careless, Gerald M. Craig and Eldon Ray, he co-authored a Spotlight on Canada Series for general readers on different aspects of Canada's new international role in the post-World War II era, focusing on its place in the Commonwealth, the Americas, and the World. A consolidated version of the Spotlight on Canada series was also issued in a single volume edited by Alex A. Cameron under the title Canada's Heritage.

== Personal life ==
Brown married Vera Beatrice Kenny, a Victoria College classmate, in 1920 and they had two sons and two daughters. He was an active United Church of Canada layman and was a strong supporter of the ecumenical movement. He chaired the Committee on International Affairs of the Canadian Council of Churches, which for many years organized an annual Churchmen's Seminar on International Affairs.
