= John J. Bukowczyk =

American immigration and ethnic historian

John Joseph Bukowczyk (born 1950) is a professor of history at Wayne State University specializing in American immigration, history of American urban settlements and ethnic groups - in particular, Polish Americans.

He also is the recipient of the Gold Cross of Merit of the Republic of Poland and of several awards from the Polish American Historical Association (PAHA). He is also a member of the PAHA council (as of 2019).

He has degrees from Northwestern University (undergraduate in history and political science) and Harvard University (A.M., PhD American History).

== Career ==
Professor Bukowczyk specializes in American immigration, ethnicity, and urban history. His extensive research explores the formation and evolution of personal and group identities, urban development, intergroup relations, and social justice, all while contemplating the fundamental nature of American identity. He is the author or co-author of books such as And My Children Did Not Know Me: A History of the Polish Americans and the award-winning Permeable Border: The Great Lakes Basin as Transnational Region, 1650-1990. He has also edited numerous volumes focusing on Detroit, Polish American history, and immigrant experiences. His contributions to the field have earned him recognition through multiple awards from the American Historical Association, the New Jersey Historical Commission, and the Polish American Historical Association, as well as honors from Wayne State University and the Polish government. His research has been supported by numerous grants. Professor Bukowczyk previously edited the Journal of American Ethnic History and currently heads the Ohio University Press Polish and Polish-American Studies Series. He also serves on several journal editorial boards and is a past president of the Polish American Historical Association. His earlier involvement included organizing the North American Labor History Conference and teaching in Wayne State's Labor Studies Center.

== Works ==
- John J. Bukowczyk (1987). And my children did not know me: a history of the Polish-Americans. Indiana University Press. ISBN 978-0-253-30701-9.
- John J. Bukowczyk (December 1996). Polish Americans and Their History: Community, Culture, and Politics. University of Pittsburgh Pre. ISBN 978-0-8229-7321-8.
- John J. Bukowczyk (12 July 2017). A History of the Polish Americans. Taylor & Francis. ISBN 978-1-351-53520-5.
