= Peter Thomas McGuigan =

Canadian historian (1942–2017)

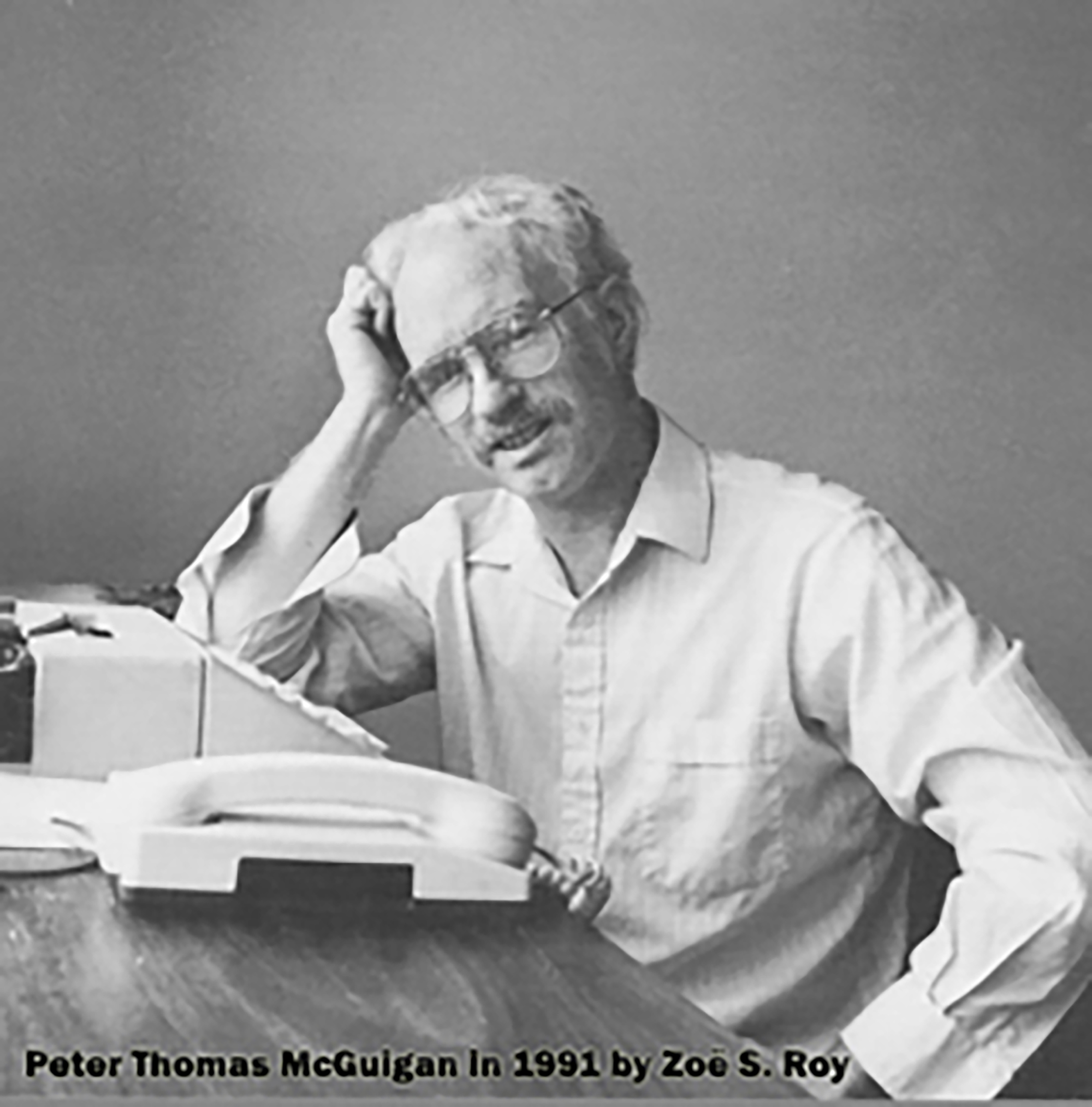
- Born: December 29, 1942; Halifax, Nova Scotia
- Died: December 8, 2017 (aged 74); Halifax, Nova Scotia
- Writing career
- Notable works: The Intrigues of Archbishop John T. McNally and the Rise of Saint Mary’s University

Peter Thomas McGuigan (December 29, 1942 – December 8, 2017) was a Canadian historian and freelance writer.

Born in Halifax, Nova Scotia, a son of the late James and Stella McGuigan and a distant relative of James Charles McGuigan, McGuigan graduated from Dalhousie and Saint Mary's universities, and held a master's degree in Atlantic Canada Studies.

== Career ==
McGuigan researched and wrote about Irish immigrant communities of the 19th century in Nova Scotia. He wrote a column called Looking Back about the evolution of Halifax's south end for the Southender magazine and a heritage column in The Chronicle Herald. McGuigan was also a long-time contributor and vendor to a local newspaper: Street Feat: The Voice of the Poor.

McGuigan's last book, The Intrigues of Archbishop John T. McNally and the Rise of Saint Mary’s University, is "a truly fascinating and unique chronicle, mixing biography, local heritage, and institutional history in equal parts". McGuigan was working on a new book about the historic Halifax Poor House at the time of his death after a brief battle with cancer.

== Publications ==
- McGuigan, Peter T. (1991). The Irish. Tantallon, N.S.: Four East Publications. ISBN 0-920427-32-4.
- McGuigan, Peter T. (2007). Historic South End Halifax. Nimbus Publishing. ISBN 978-1-55109-602-5.
- McGuigan, Peter T. (2012). The Intrigues of Archbishop John T. McNally and the Rise of Saint Mary's University. Fernwood Publishing. ISBN 978-1-55266-514-5.
