= Keith Matthews (historian) =

English historian of Newfoundland (1938–1984)

- Born: 1938; Plympton, Devon, England
- Died: 1984 (aged 45–46)
- Genre: Jazz
- Occupations: Pianist, historian
- Instrument: Piano

Keith Matthews (1938 – 1984) was an English jazz pianist and prominent historian of Newfoundland, best known for his Oxford University D.Phil. thesis "The West of England Newfoundland Fishery" and for a highly influential essay "Fence Building: A Critique of the Historeography of Newfoundland."

Born in Plympton, Devon, Matthews left school at an early age to work as a jazz pianist in London, England. After military service he attended Ruskin College, Oxford where he pursued a degree in history. A chance meeting with Newfoundland lexicographer George M. Story resulted in Matthews being offered a fellowship if he would write on the history of the West of England Newfoundland fishery. His D.Phil. thesis was an important work, becoming a standard work on the history of the migratory fishery.

Matthews took up work at Memorial University of Newfoundland, where he taught the history of Newfoundland and Labrador. His critique of the traditional historiography argued that previous historians had been mistaken in their assumption that conflict between competing groups had shaped the settlement and constitutional development of the island of Newfoundland. Different historians had believed that the conflict was between merchants in the west of England and settlers in Newfoundland, or between West Country merchants and London based merchants. Matthews found little evidence of such conflict and argued that settlement was not inconsistent with the migratory fishery. He argued that the laws prohibiting settlement were short-lived and ineffectual. The slow pace of settlement was, therefore, a result of other factors.

In 1966, the British Public Record Office decided to dispose of the "Registrar General of Shipping and Seaman, the Agreements and Account of Crew and Official Logbooks" of the British Empire for the years between 1861 and 1913. When Matthews became aware of that he arranged for the bulk of the records to be transferred to the Maritime History Archive at Memorial University.

With his colleague David Alexander, Matthews embarked upon a study of the shipping industry of Atlantic Canada.

Matthews amassed a substantial collection of English, Irish and Newfoundland records to develop a database of family names and businesses that were involved in the settlement, fisheries and trade of Newfoundland to 1850. The files consist of parish registers, newspapers, shipping records, customs records, political papers, census records, merchant records, and diaries, from which he extracted 7,300 surnames, subdivided by given name. The Keith Matthews Name Files, 1500–1850, are housed in the Maritime History Archive, Memorial University.
