= Gregory Kealey =

Canadian historian

Gregory S. Kealey CM FRHistS FRSC (born 1948) is a historian of the working class in Canada, founding editor of the journal Labour/Le Travail, and former vice-president (research) and provost of the University of New Brunswick, where he is Professor Emeritus of History. The author and editor of numerous books and articles on labour history, intelligence studies, and state security, Kealey is a fellow of the Royal Historical Society and Royal Society of Canada and served as president of the Canadian Historical Association. In 2016 the Canadian Historical Review published a memoir of his career. In 2017 he was appointed a member of the Order of Canada.

== Early life and education ==
Born in Toronto in 1948, Kealey attended St. Michael's College School, a high school for boys, where he focused on history. He completed his bachelor's degree in Modern History at the University of Toronto in 1970, serving on the Students Administrative Council and participating in the student movement. He completed his MA and PhD at the University of Rochester, working under the supervision of American labour historian Herbert Gutman and Christopher Lasch on a dissertation that examined the Toronto working class during the transition to industrial capitalism. He would later publish this work in the Canadian Historical Association's Macdonald prize-winning book Toronto Workers Respond to Industrial Capitalism (1980). He followed this work with the co-authored (with Bryan Palmer), the CHA and AHA Corey prize-winning Dreaming of What Might Be: The Knights of Labor in Ontario (1982).

In 1976 Kealey helped found the journal Labour/Le Travail to provide an outlet for a new generation of scholars practising the "new labour and working-class history," influenced by the work of E. P. Thompson and the Marxist tradition. He edited the journal from 1976 to 1997, when Bryan Palmer took over as editor. He returned briefly in 2016–17 as a co-editor, first with Bryan Palmer and then with Charles Smith. The journal, published by the Canadian Committee on Labour History, also produced books in the field under the CCLH imprint, many of which Kealey has edited. Kealey and his peers also co-operatively ran New Hogtown Press, a successor to the earlier Hogtown Press, publishing a number of books and left-wing pamphlets in the 1970s and 1980s in an attempt to provide a model of a non-profit socialist enterprise within a capitalist society.

== Teaching, research, and administration ==
Returning to Toronto after his doctoral studies in 1972, Kealey worked on his dissertation and his partner, fellow labour historian Linda Kealey, commenced her own PhD work at the University of Toronto, initially under the supervision of Jill Ker Conway. They moved to Halifax in 1974, where he began his academic career as an assistant professor of history at Dalhousie University and then moved to Memorial University of Newfoundland in 1981, where he served as university research professor and later as dean of the school of graduate studies. While in St. John's, Kealey wrote a regular labour column for the Telegram newspaper. He was elected a Fellow of the Royal Society of Canada in 1999.

In 2001, Kealey was appointed vice-president (research) at the University of New Brunswick, relocating to Fredericton. He assumed the role of provost of the university in 2008, holding both positions until 2012, while serving on the boards of a number of organizations and spearheading the university's rapidly expanding research activities, including successful commercialization efforts. In 2017 Kealey was awarded the Order of Canada.

Focusing on research as professor of history, Kealey co-authored with Reg Whitaker and Andy Parnaby the book Secret Service: Political Policing in Canada from the Fenians to Fortress America in 2012, which won the CFHSS's Canada Prize for the Social Sciences and an Honourable Mention for the Macdonald Prize of the Canadian Historical Association. It was also shortlisted for the JW Dafoe Book Prize and the Smiley Prize of the Canadian Political Science Association. He also co-edited the book Debating Dissent (2012), a collection of essays on Canada in the 1960s. He travelled to Australia and New Zealand in 2013 as a visiting scholar at Monash and Massey universities, which reflects his significant scholarly associations on three continents. He returned to Massey as a visiting fellow in 2015. In 2017 the University of Toronto Press published his collection of essays, Spying on Canadians.

Kealey has supervised more than 20 PhDs to completion at Dalhousie, MUN and UNB, including Craig Heron, John Manley, Sean Cadigan, Mark Leier, Christina Burr, Michael Smith, Miriam Wright, Andrew Parnaby, Dominique Clement, Michelle McBride, Janis Thiessen, Michael Butt, Fred Winsor, Richard Rennie, Kurt Korneski, Kirk Niergarth, Benjamin Isitt, Christopher Powell, David Foord and William Vinh-Doyle. He served on the scientific advisory committee of the Council of Canadian Academies and served on the finance committee of the Royal Society of Canada. He also continues to serve as treasurer and chair of the publications committee of the Canadian Committee on Labour History. In addition he is a member of the board of the Fergusson Foundation, which is dedicated to combating family violence.

== Published works ==
- Kealey, Gregory (1980). Toronto Workers Respond to Industrial Capitalism, 1867-1892. University of Toronto Press. ISBN 978-0-8020-6883-5. JSTOR 10.3138/j.ctt2tv4f4.
- Kealey, Gregory S.; Palmer, Bryan D. (1982). Dreaming of What Might Be: The Knights of Labor in Ontario, 1880-1900. Cambridge University Press. ISBN 978-0-521-54571-6.
- Kealey, Gregory S. (1995). Workers and Canadian History. McGill-Queen's Press - MQUP. ISBN 978-0-7735-6567-8.
- Kealey, Gregory S.; Whitaker, Reginald; Parnaby, Andrew (2012). Secret Service: Political Policing in Canada : from the Fenians to Fortress America. University of Toronto Press. ISBN 978-0-8020-0752-0.
- Kealey, Gregory S.; Campbell, Lara; Clément, Dominique (2012). Debating Dissent: Canada and the Sixties. University of Toronto Press. ISBN 978-1-4426-1078-1.
- Kealey, Gregory S. (2017). Spying on Canadians: The Royal Canadian Mounted Police Security Service and the Origins of the Long Cold War. University of Toronto Press. ISBN 978-1-4875-0166-2.
- Kealey, Gregory S.; Whitaker, Reg. "R.C.M.P. Security Bulletins Eight volumes". University of New Brunswick.
