= Charles Perry Stacey =

Canadian historian (1906–1989)

Charles Perry Stacey OC OBE CD FRSC
- Born: 30 July 1906; Toronto, Ontario
- Died: 17 November 1989 (aged 83); Toronto, Ontario
- Burial place: Mount Pleasant Cemetery, Toronto
- Education: University of Toronto (B.A., 1927); Oxford University (B.A., 1929); Princeton University (A.M., 1931, Ph.D., 1933)
- Spouse: Doris Newton Shiell (m. 1939; died 1969)
- Military career
- Allegiance: Canada
- Branch: Canadian Army
- Service years: 1924–1959
- Rank: Colonel
- Units: Historical Section, General Staff

Colonel Charles Perry Stacey OC OBE CD FRSC (30 July 1906 – 17 November 1989) was a Canadian historian and university professor. He served as the official historian of the Canadian Army in the Second World War and published extensively on military and political matters.

== Early life and education ==
Stacey was born in Toronto, Ontario to Dr Charles Edward Stacey (1860–1927) and Pearl Perry (1878–1964). The Stacey family was of Anglo-Irish, Church of Ireland origin. After attending the University of Toronto Schools, he received a Bachelor of Arts degree in history from the University of Toronto in 1927. In 1924 he joined the Canadian Militia.

Stacey received a second bachelor's degree in history from Corpus Christi College, Oxford, in 1929. He received a Doctor of Philosophy degree from Princeton University in 1933.

== Career ==
From 1933 to 1940, Stacey was a member of the history department at Princeton University. With the advent of the Second World War, he was given the rank of major and appointed as historical officer to the Canadian Army. He served in the United Kingdom for most of the war, headed a team dedicated to collecting and collating information for future historians, and wrote contemporary reports. His reports provided factual details about many military operations, including the Dieppe Raid and Operation Spring.

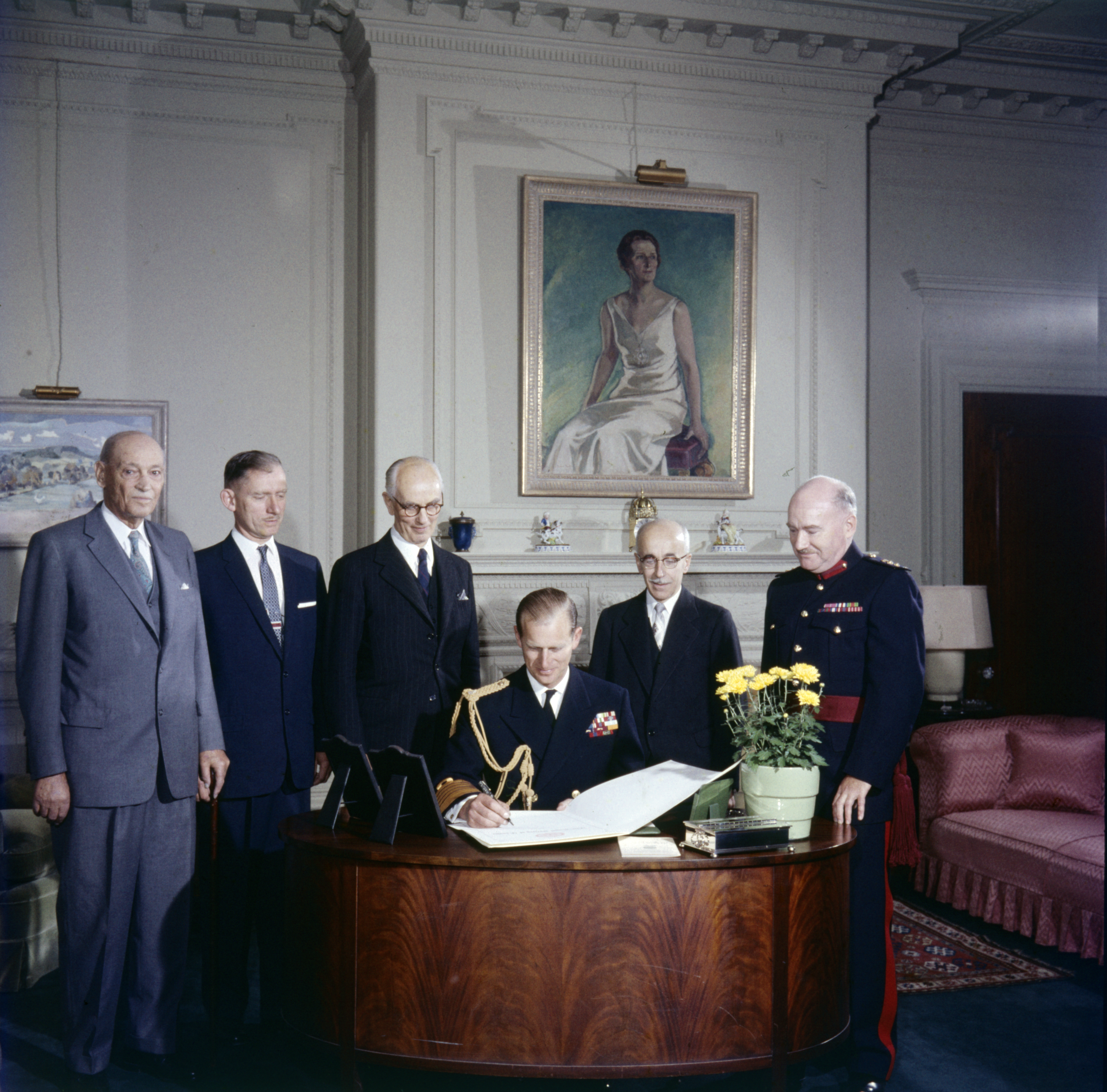
Visit of Prince Philip (seated) to the Royal Society of Canada. Officers of the Society (standing left to right): Dr. Charles Camsell, Dr. Loris Shano (L.S.) Russell, Dr. T.W.N. Cameron, president Leon Marion and Colonel C.P. Stacey in 1957.

After the war, Stacey worked with a team to create an official history of the Canadian military operations during the conflict. He benefited from his access to the major Canadian military and political figures involved in the war, both during the conflict and afterwards, when the official histories were being finalized. The three volume set was published in 1955.

A comment he made after the war regarding war brides, whom he called "Most excellent citizens," became the title of a book on the subject by Eswyn Lyster.

Stacey eventually attained the rank of colonel. In total, he served in the militia and the army for 35 years (1924–1959).

From 1959 to 1975, Stacey was a professor of history at the University of Toronto. He continued to research and write analysis of Canadian military operations. He published an autobiography, A Date With History, which presented much background information regarding the writing of the Official History of the Canadian Army in the Second World War. He extended those themes in volumes The Half Million (dealing with the Canadian forces stationed in Britain) and Arms, Men, and Government (concerning the government in Canada) during the war.

Stacey also wrote a critical analysis of the writing process of the Official History of World War I (only one of the projected eight volumes by the original author ever appeared in print). His book, Arms, Men, and Governments: The War Policies of Canada, 1939-1945 also won the Albert B. Corey Prize, awarded jointly by the Canadian Historical Association and American Historical Association, in 1972.

He died in Toronto in 1989. His personal and research papers are in the University of Toronto Archives.

Since 1988, an award called the C.P. Stacey Prize has been given by the Canadian Committee for the History of the Second World War "for distinguished publications on the twentieth-century military experience."

== Personal life ==
On 26 August 1939 Stacey married Doris Newton Shiell, daughter of R. T. Shiell. Doris was born in Toronto in 1903. After Colonel Stacey's retirement from the Army in 1959, the couple lived in a house at 89 Tranmer Avenue in Toronto. Doris died in Toronto on 5 December 1969. Colonel Stacey died in Toronto on 17 November 1989 at age 83. He is buried in Mount Pleasant Cemetery in Toronto.

== Selected bibliography ==
- Canada and the British Army (1936)
- The Canadian Army 1939-1945 (1948), winner of the 1948 Governor General's Award for English-language non-fiction
- Official History of the Canadian Army in the Second World War. Six Years of War: The Army in Canada, Britain, and the Pacific (Ottawa: The Queens Printer, 1955)
- Quebec, 1759: The Siege and the Battle (1959)
  - (An updated version was published in 2001 with new material by Donald E. Graves.)
- Records of the Nile Voyageurs, 1884-1885: The Canadian Voyageur Contingent in the Gordon Relief Expedition (Toronto: Champlain Society Publications, 1959)
- Official History of the Canadian Army in the Second World War. The Victory Campaign: The Operations in North-West Europe, 1944-1945 (Ottawa: The Queens Printer, 1960)
- The Battle of Little York (1963)
- Arms, Men, and Governments: The War Policies of Canada, 1939-1945 (Ottawa: Minister of National Defence, 1970)' online free
- A Very Double Life: The Private World of Mackenzie King (1976)
- Canada and the Age of Conflict Vol. 1 (1977), (Toronto: University of Toronto Press), ISBN 0-8020-6560-0.
- Canada and the Age of Conflict Vol. 2 (1981), (Toronto: University of Toronto Press), ISBN 0-8020-2397-5.
- (with Barbara M. Wilson) The Half-Million: The Canadians in Britain, 1939-1946 (1987), (Toronto: University of Toronto Press).
- A Date With History ISBN 0-88879-086-4

== See also ==
- Most Excellent Citizens – a book on the World War II war bride experience, title based on a quote from C.P. Stacey
