= Shaughnessy Cohen Prize for Political Writing =

Annual Canadian literary prize

The Shaughnessy Cohen Prize for Political Writing is a Canadian literary award, presented by the Writers' Trust of Canada to the best nonfiction book on Canadian political and social issues. It has been presented annually in Ottawa at the Writers’ Trust Politics and the Pen gala since 2000, superseding the organization's defunct Gordon Montador Award.

The award has a monetary value of CAD40,000 as of 2025.

The prize was established in honour of Shaughnessy Cohen (February 11, 1948 - December 9, 1998), an outspoken and popular Liberal Member of Parliament from Windsor, Ontario who died after suffering a cerebral hemorrhage in the House of Commons of Canada just seconds after standing to address her peers. The award is sponsored by CN.

== Submissions ==
All Canadian-based publishers of original manuscripts may enter two books; companies publishing more than ten eligible nonfiction titles during the 2012 calendar year may add one book for every additional ten eligible books (or fraction thereof) on their nonfiction list, up to a maximum of five. For example, a publisher with a list of 18 qualifying nonfiction books would be entitled to submit three — two for the first ten and one for the next ten.

== Jury ==
A three-person jury selects the winner and finalists of the Shaughnessy Cohen Prize for Political Writing. The jury acts independently of the Writers’ Trust and is charged with interpreting the mandate and eligibility criteria of the prize, as well as determining which of the submissions best reflect the prize mandate. In evaluating the writing, literary merit is the sole criterion. Each juror may request an unlimited number of additional titles from the publisher's lists. Such titles are on equal footing with all other submissions, provided that their publishers agree to abide by the conditions laid out in this document. The judgment of the jury in selecting the winners, determining eligibility, and interpreting these rules is final.

== Winners and nominees ==
=== 2000s ===
Year	Jury	Author	Book	Result	Ref.
2001	John Crosbie Ron Graham Peter Newman	Erna Paris	Long Shadows: Truth, Lies and History	Winner	
2001	John Crosbie Ron Graham Peter Newman	Victoria Freeman	Distant Relations: How My Ancestors Colonized North America	Shortlist	
2001	John Crosbie Ron Graham Peter Newman	Myrna Kostash	The Next Canada: In Search of our Future Nation	Shortlist	
2001	John Crosbie Ron Graham Peter Newman	Carol Off	The Lion, the Fox, & the Eagle: A Story of Generals and Justice in Rwanda and Yugoslavia	Shortlist	
2001	John Crosbie Ron Graham Peter Newman	Margaret Somerville	The Ethical Canary: Science, Society and the Human Spirit	Shortlist	
2002	Maggie Siggins Pamela Wallin Hugh Winsor	Daniel Poliquin (tr. Donald Winkler)	In the Name of the Father: An Essay on Quebec Nationalism	Winner	
2002	Maggie Siggins Pamela Wallin Hugh Winsor	Ingeborg Boyens	Another Season's Promise	Shortlist	
2002	Maggie Siggins Pamela Wallin Hugh Winsor	Janice Gross Stein	The Cult of Efficiency	Shortlist	
2002	Maggie Siggins Pamela Wallin Hugh Winsor	Linda McQuaig	All You Can Eat	Shortlist	
2002	Maggie Siggins Pamela Wallin Hugh Winsor	Julian Sher	Until You Are Dead	Shortlist	
2003	Susan Delacourt Bob Rae Janice Gross Stein	John Duffy	Fights of Our Lives: Elections, Leadership and the Making of Canada	Winner	
2003	Susan Delacourt Bob Rae Janice Gross Stein	Stephen Clarkson	Uncle Sam and Us: Globalization, Neoconservatism, and the Canadian State	Shortlist	
2003	Susan Delacourt Bob Rae Janice Gross Stein	Colin N. Perkel	Well of Lies: The Walkerton Water Tragedy	Shortlist	
2003	Susan Delacourt Bob Rae Janice Gross Stein	John Saywell	The Lawmakers: Judicial Power and the Shaping of Canadian Federalism	Shortlist	
2003	Susan Delacourt Bob Rae Janice Gross Stein	Daniel Stoffman	Who Gets In: What’s Wrong with Canada’s Immigration Program – and How to Fix It	Shortlist	
2004	Clive Doucet Margaret MacMillan Peter Mansbridge	Roméo Dallaire	Shake Hands with the Devil: The Failure of Humanity in Rwanda	Winner	
2004	Clive Doucet Margaret MacMillan Peter Mansbridge	Jane Doe	The Story of Jane Doe	Shortlist	
2004	Clive Doucet Margaret MacMillan Peter Mansbridge	Julian Sher, William Marsden	The Road to Hell: How the Biker Gangs Are Conquering Canada	Shortlist	
2005	Pat Carney Andrew Cohen Marci McDonald	Jane Jacobs	Dark Age Ahead	Winner	
2005	Pat Carney Andrew Cohen Marci McDonald	Gwynne Dyer	Future: Tense: The Coming World Order	Shortlist	
2005	Pat Carney Andrew Cohen Marci McDonald	Jack Granatstein	Who Killed the Canadian Military?	Shortlist	
2005	Pat Carney Andrew Cohen Marci McDonald	Jennifer Welsh	At Home in the World: Canada's Global Vision for the 21st Century	Shortlist	
2005	Pat Carney Andrew Cohen Marci McDonald	Rex Weyler	Greenpeace: How a Group of Ecologists, Journalists and Visionaries Changed the World	Shortlist	
2006	Sheila Copps Bill Fox Christopher Waddell	Miriam Shuchman	The Drug Trial: Nancy Olivieri and the Science Scandal that Rocked the Hospital for Sick Children	Winner	
2006	Sheila Copps Bill Fox Christopher Waddell	Kim Bolan	Loss of Faith: How the Air-India Bombers Got Away with Murder	Shortlist	
2006	Sheila Copps Bill Fox Christopher Waddell	William Johnson	Stephen Harper and the Future of Canada	Shortlist	
2006	Sheila Copps Bill Fox Christopher Waddell	Amy Knight	How the Cold War Began: The Gouzenko Affair and the Hunt for Soviet Spies	Shortlist	
2006	Sheila Copps Bill Fox Christopher Waddell	Susanne Reber, Robert Renaud	Starlight Tour: The Last, Lonely Night of Neil Stonechild	Shortlist	
2007	Carol Goar Arthur Kroeger Susan Riley	Max Nemni, Monique Nemni (tr. William Johnson)	Young Trudeau: Son of Quebec, Father of Canada, 1919-1944	Winner	
2007	Carol Goar Arthur Kroeger Susan Riley	John English	Citizen of the World: The Life of Pierre Elliott Trudeau, Volume 1: 1919-1968	Shortlist	
2007	Carol Goar Arthur Kroeger Susan Riley	Eddie Goldenberg	The Way It Works: Inside Ottawa	Shortlist	
2007	Carol Goar Arthur Kroeger Susan Riley	Allan Gotlieb	The Washington Diaries, 1981-1989	Shortlist	
2007	Carol Goar Arthur Kroeger Susan Riley	Carol Off	Bitter Chocolate: Investigating the Dark Side of the World’s Most Seductive Sweet	Shortlist	
2008	Robert Bothwell Lawrence Martin Brigitte Pellerin	Janice Gross Stein, Eugene Lang	The Unexpected War: Canada in Kandahar	Winner	
2008	Robert Bothwell Lawrence Martin Brigitte Pellerin	Clive Doucet	Urban Meltdown: Cities, Climate Change and Politics as Usual	Shortlist	
2008	Robert Bothwell Lawrence Martin Brigitte Pellerin	Richard Gwyn	John A: The Man Who Made Us; The Life and Times of John A. Macdonald, Volume One: 1815–1867	Shortlist	
2008	Robert Bothwell Lawrence Martin Brigitte Pellerin	Andrea Mandel-Campbell	Why Mexicans Don’t Drink Molson	Shortlist	
2008	Robert Bothwell Lawrence Martin Brigitte Pellerin	David E. Smith	The People’s House of Commons: Theories of Democracy in Contention	Shortlist	
2009	Chantal Hébert William Johnson David Walmsley	James Orbinski	An Imperfect Offering: Humanitarian Action in the Twenty-first Century	Winner	
2009	Chantal Hébert William Johnson David Walmsley	Daphne Bramham	The Secret Lives of Saints: Child Brides and Lost Boys in Canada’s Polygamous Mormon Sect	Shortlist	
2009	Chantal Hébert William Johnson David Walmsley	Erna Paris	The Sun Climbs Slow: Justice in the Age of Imperial America	Shortlist	
2009	Chantal Hébert William Johnson David Walmsley	Marie Wadden	Where the Pavement Ends: Canada’s Aboriginal Recovery Movement and the Urgent Need for Reconciliation	Shortlist	
2009	Chantal Hébert William Johnson David Walmsley	Chris Wood	Dry Spring: The Coming Water Crisis of North America	Shortlist	

=== 2010s ===
Year	Jury	Author	Book	Result	Ref.
2010	Andrew Nikiforuk Erna Paris Michael Petrou	John English	Just Watch Me: The Life of Pierre Elliott Trudeau, 1968-2000	Winner	
2010	Andrew Nikiforuk Erna Paris Michael Petrou	Terry Gould	Murder Without Borders: Dying for the Story in the World’s Most Dangerous Places	Shortlist	
2010	Andrew Nikiforuk Erna Paris Michael Petrou	Rudyard Griffiths	Who We Are: A Citizen’s Manifesto	Shortlist	
2010	Andrew Nikiforuk Erna Paris Michael Petrou	James Maskalyk	Six Months in Sudan: A Young Doctor in a War-Torn Village	Shortlist	
2010	Andrew Nikiforuk Erna Paris Michael Petrou	Daniel Poliquin	René Lévesque	Shortlist	
2011	L. Ian MacDonald Rosemary Speirs Paul Wells	Anna Porter	The Ghosts of Europe: Central Europe's Past and Uncertain Future	Winner	
2011	L. Ian MacDonald Rosemary Speirs Paul Wells	Tim Cook	The Madman and the Butcher: The Sensational Wars of Sam Hughes and General Arthur Currie	Shortlist	
2011	L. Ian MacDonald Rosemary Speirs Paul Wells	Shelagh D. Grant	Polar Imperatives: A History of Arctic Sovereignty in North America	Shortlist	
2011	L. Ian MacDonald Rosemary Speirs Paul Wells	Lawrence Martin	Harperland: The Politics of Control	Shortlist	
2011	L. Ian MacDonald Rosemary Speirs Paul Wells	Doug Saunders	Arrival City: The Final Migration and our Next World	Shortlist	
2012	David Akin Charlotte Gray Janice Gross Stein	Richard Gwyn	Nation Maker: Sir John A. Macdonald: His Life, Our Times; Volume Two: 1867-1891	Winner	
2012	David Akin Charlotte Gray Janice Gross Stein	Ron Graham	The Last Act: Pierre Trudeau, the Gang of Eight, and the Fight for Canada	Shortlist	
2012	David Akin Charlotte Gray Janice Gross Stein	Max Nemni, Monique Nemni (tr. George Tombs)	Trudeau Transformed: The Shaping of a Statesman, 1944-1965	Shortlist	
2012	David Akin Charlotte Gray Janice Gross Stein	Andrew Nikiforuk	Empire of the Beetle: How Human Folly and a Tiny Bug Are Killing North America’s Great Forests	Shortlist	
2012	David Akin Charlotte Gray Janice Gross Stein	Jacques Poitras	Imaginary Line: Life on an Unfinished Border	Shortlist	
2013	Ed Broadbent Tasha Kheiriddin Daniel Poliquin	Marcello Di Cintio	Walls: Travels Along the Barricades	Winner	
2013	Ed Broadbent Tasha Kheiriddin Daniel Poliquin	Taras Grescoe	Straphanger: Saving Our Cities and Ourselves from the Automobile	Shortlist	
2013	Ed Broadbent Tasha Kheiriddin Daniel Poliquin	Noah Richler	What We Talk About When We Talk About War	Shortlist	
2013	Ed Broadbent Tasha Kheiriddin Daniel Poliquin	Jeffrey Simpson	Chronic Condition: Why Canada’s Health-Care System Needs to be Dragged into the 21st Century	Shortlist	
2013	Ed Broadbent Tasha Kheiriddin Daniel Poliquin	Peter Trent	The Merger Delusion: How Swallowing Its Suburbs Made an Even Bigger Mess of Montreal	Shortlist	
2014	Licia Corbella Jane O'Hara Doug Saunders	Paul Wells	The Longer I'm Prime Minister: Stephen Harper and Canada, 2006	Winner	
2014	Licia Corbella Jane O'Hara Doug Saunders	Margaret MacMillan	The War That Ended Peace: The Road to 1914	Shortlist	
2014	Licia Corbella Jane O'Hara Doug Saunders	Charles Montgomery	Happy City: Transforming Our Lives through Urban Design	Shortlist	
2014	Licia Corbella Jane O'Hara Doug Saunders	Donald J. Savoie	Whatever Happened to the Music Teacher? How Government Decides and Why	Shortlist	
2014	Licia Corbella Jane O'Hara Doug Saunders	Graeme Smith	The Dogs Are Eating Them Now: Our War in Afghanistan	Shortlist	
2015	Denise Chong Terry Glavin Jane Taber	Joseph Heath	Enlightenment 2.0: Restoring Sanity to Our Politics, Our Economy, and Our Lives	Winner	
2015	Denise Chong Terry Glavin Jane Taber	Chantal Hébert, Jean Lapierre	The Morning After: The 1995 Quebec Referendum and the Day that Almost Was	Shortlist	
2015	Denise Chong Terry Glavin Jane Taber	Naomi Klein	This Changes Everything: Capitalism vs. the Climate	Shortlist	
2015	Denise Chong Terry Glavin Jane Taber	John Ralston Saul	The Comeback: How Aboriginals Are Reclaiming Power and Influence	Shortlist	
2015	Denise Chong Terry Glavin Jane Taber	Graham Steele	What I Learned About Politics: Inside the Rise – and Collapse – of Nova Scotia’s NDP Government	Shortlist	
2016	Tim Cook Robyn Doolittle Antonia Maioni	John Ibbitson	Stephen Harper	Winner	
2016	Tim Cook Robyn Doolittle Antonia Maioni	Greg Donaghy	Grit: The Life and Politics of Paul Martin Sr.	Shortlist	
2016	Tim Cook Robyn Doolittle Antonia Maioni	Norman Hillmer	O.D. Skelton: A Portrait of Canadian Ambition	Shortlist	
2016	Tim Cook Robyn Doolittle Antonia Maioni	Andrew Nikiforuk	Slick Water: Fracking and One Insider’s Stand Against the World’s Most Powerful Industry	Shortlist	
2016	Tim Cook Robyn Doolittle Antonia Maioni	Sheila Watt-Cloutier	The Right To Be Cold: One Woman’s Story of Protecting Her Culture, the Arctic, and the Whole Planet	Shortlist	
2017	Nahlah Ayed Colby Cosh Megan Leslie	Kamal Al-Solaylee	Brown: What Being Brown in the World Today Means (To Everyone)	Winner	
2017	Nahlah Ayed Colby Cosh Megan Leslie	Christie Blatchford	Life Sentence: Stories from Four Decades of Court Reporting — Or, How I Fell Out of Love with the Canadian Justice System (Especially Judges)	Shortlist	
2017	Nahlah Ayed Colby Cosh Megan Leslie	Ian McKay, Jamie Swift	The Vimy Trap: Or, How We Learned to Stop Worrying and Love the Great War	Shortlist	
2017	Nahlah Ayed Colby Cosh Megan Leslie	James McLeod	Turmoil, as Usual: Politics in Newfoundland and Labrador and the Road to the 2015 Election	Shortlist	
2017	Nahlah Ayed Colby Cosh Megan Leslie	Noah Richler	The Candidate: Fear and Loathing on the Campaign Trail	Shortlist	
2018	Taiaiake Alfred Joseph Heath Kady O'Malley	Tanya Talaga	Seven Fallen Feathers: Racism, Death, and Hard Truths in a Northern City	Winner	
2018	Taiaiake Alfred Joseph Heath Kady O'Malley	Christopher Dummitt	Unbuttoned: A History of Mackenzie King’s Secret Life	Shortlist	
2018	Taiaiake Alfred Joseph Heath Kady O'Malley	Carol Off	All We Leave Behind: A Reporter’s Journey into the Lives of Others	Shortlist	
2018	Taiaiake Alfred Joseph Heath Kady O'Malley	Sandra Perron	Out Standing in the Field: A Memoir by Canada’s First Female Infantry Officer	Shortlist	
2018	Taiaiake Alfred Joseph Heath Kady O'Malley	Ted Rowe	Robert Bond: The Greatest Newfoundlander	Shortlist	
2019	André Picard Angela Sterritt Chris Turner	Rachel Giese	Boys: What It Means to Become a Man	Winner	
2019	André Picard Angela Sterritt Chris Turner	Abu Bakr Al-Rabeeah, Winnie Yeung	Homes: A Refugee Story	Shortlist	
2019	André Picard Angela Sterritt Chris Turner	Sarah Cox	Breaching the Peace: The Site C Dam and a Valley’s Stand Against Big Hydro	Shortlist	
2019	André Picard Angela Sterritt Chris Turner	Jacques Poitras	Pipe Dreams: The Fight for Canada’s Energy Future	Shortlist	
2019	André Picard Angela Sterritt Chris Turner	Harley Rustad	Big Lonely Doug: The Story of One of Canada’s Last Great Trees	Shortlist	

=== 2020s ===
Year	Jury	Author	Book	Result	Ref.
2020	Greg Donaghy Althia Raj Paula Simons	Beverley McLachlin	Truth Be Told: My Journey Through Life and the Law	Winner	
2020	Greg Donaghy Althia Raj Paula Simons	Adam Chapnick	Canada on the United Nations Security Council: A Small Power on a Large Stage	Shortlist	
2020	Greg Donaghy Althia Raj Paula Simons	Harold R. Johnson	Peace and Good Order: The Case for Indigenous Justice in Canada	Shortlist	
2020	Greg Donaghy Althia Raj Paula Simons	Jonathan Manthorpe	Claws of the Panda: Beijing's Campaign of Influence and Intimidation in Canada	Shortlist	
2020	Greg Donaghy Althia Raj Paula Simons	Kent Roach	Canadian Justice, Indigenous Injustice: The Gerald Stanley and Colten Boushie Case	Shortlist	
2021	Peter Dauvergne Adrian Harewood Heather Scoffield	Ronald Deibert	Reset: Reclaiming the Internet for Civil Society	Winner	
2021	Peter Dauvergne Adrian Harewood Heather Scoffield	Celina Caesar-Chavannes	Can You Hear Me Now?: How I Found My Voice and Learned to Live with Passion and Purpose	Shortlist	
2021	Peter Dauvergne Adrian Harewood Heather Scoffield	Desmond Cole	The Skin We're In: A Year of Black Resistance and Power	Shortlist	
2021	Peter Dauvergne Adrian Harewood Heather Scoffield	Alex Marland	Whipped: Party Discipline in Canada	Shortlist	
2021	Peter Dauvergne Adrian Harewood Heather Scoffield	Karin Wells	The Abortion Caravan: When Women Shut Down Government in the Battle for the Right to Choose	Shortlist	
2022	Charelle Evelyn Jacques Poitras Lisa Raitt	Joanna Chiu	China Unbound: A New World Disorder	Winner	
2022	Charelle Evelyn Jacques Poitras Lisa Raitt	Mike Blanchfield, Fen Osler Hampson	The Two Michaels: Innocent Canadian Captives and High Stakes Espionage in the US-China Cyber War	Shortlist	
2022	Charelle Evelyn Jacques Poitras Lisa Raitt	Flora MacDonald, Geoffrey Stevens	Flora! A Woman in a Man’s World	Shortlist	
2022	Charelle Evelyn Jacques Poitras Lisa Raitt	Stephen Poloz	The Next Age of Uncertainty: How the World Can Adapt to a Riskier Future	Shortlist	
2022	Charelle Evelyn Jacques Poitras Lisa Raitt	Jody Wilson-Raybould	Indian in the Cabinet: Speaking Truth to Power	Shortlist	
2023	Terri E. Givens Nik Nanos Jacques Poitras	Chris Turner	How to Be a Climate Optimist: Blueprints for a Better World	Winner	
2023	Terri E. Givens Nik Nanos Jacques Poitras	Norma Dunning	Kinauvit?: What’s Your Name? The Eskimo Disc System and a Daughter’s Search for Her Grandmother	Shortlist	
2023	Terri E. Givens Nik Nanos Jacques Poitras	Dale Eisler	From Left to Right: Saskatchewan’s Political and Economic Transformation	Shortlist	
2023	Terri E. Givens Nik Nanos Jacques Poitras	Josh O'Kane	Sideways: The City Google Couldn't Buy	Shortlist	
2023	Terri E. Givens Nik Nanos Jacques Poitras	Andrew Stobo Sniderman, Douglas Sanderson	Valley of the Birdtail: An Indian Reserve, a White Town, and the Road to Reconciliation	Shortlist	
2024	Joanna Chiu Dale Eisler Kathleen Wynne	John Vaillant	Fire Weather: The Making of a Beast	Winner	
2024	Joanna Chiu Dale Eisler Kathleen Wynne	Rob Goodman	Not Here: Why American Democracy Is Eroding and How Canada Can Protect Itself	Shortlist	
2024	Joanna Chiu Dale Eisler Kathleen Wynne	Benjamin Perrin	Indictment: The Criminal Justice System on Trial	Shortlist	
2024	Joanna Chiu Dale Eisler Kathleen Wynne	Donald J. Savoie	Canada: Beyond Grudges, Grievances, and Disunity	Shortlist	
2024	Joanna Chiu Dale Eisler Kathleen Wynne	Astra Taylor	The Age of Insecurity: Coming Together as Things Fall Apart	Shortlist	
2025	Jennifer Ditchburn Sara Mojtehedzadeh Chris Waddell	Raymond B. Blake	Canada's Prime Ministers and the Shaping of a National Identity	Winner	
2025	Jennifer Ditchburn Sara Mojtehedzadeh Chris Waddell	Stephen Maher	The Prince: The Turbulent Reign of Justin Trudeau	Shortlist	
2025	Jennifer Ditchburn Sara Mojtehedzadeh Chris Waddell	Jane Philpott	Health for All: A Doctor’s Prescription for a Healthier Canada	Shortlist	
2025	Jennifer Ditchburn Sara Mojtehedzadeh Chris Waddell	Alasdair Roberts	The Adaptable Country: How Canada Can Survive the Twenty-First Century	Shortlist	
2025	Jennifer Ditchburn Sara Mojtehedzadeh Chris Waddell	Tanya Talaga	The Knowing	Shortlist	
2026	Norma Dunning Chantal Hébert Paul Wells	Maggie Helwig	Encampment: Resistance, Grace, and an Unhoused Community	Winner	
2026	Norma Dunning Chantal Hébert Paul Wells	Don Gillmor	On Oil	Shortlist	
2026	Norma Dunning Chantal Hébert Paul Wells	Brian Stewart	On the Ground: My Life as a Foreign Correspondent	Shortlist	
2026	Norma Dunning Chantal Hébert Paul Wells	Karin Wells	Women Who Woke up the Law: Inside the Cases that Changed Women’s Rights in Canada	Shortlist	
2026	Norma Dunning Chantal Hébert Paul Wells	Ira Wells	On Book Banning: Or, How the New Censorship Consensus Trivializes Art and Undermines Democracy	Shortlist	
