= William Johnson (Canadian author) =

Canadian journalist (1931–2020)

William Denis Hertel Johnson, CM (23 April 1931 – 2 March 2020) was a Canadian academic, journalist, and author.

== Early life and education ==
Johnson's mother was francophone and his father anglophone and Johnson himself spoke both English and French. His mother was outspoken in the Ontario rights movement regarding French school access under Regulation 17.

For seven years Johnson attended Collège Jean-de-Brébeuf in Montreal, and held an MA in French literature from the Université de Montréal. At home, he spoke only French with his wife, who has a doctorate in French literature.

== Career ==
Johnson taught sociology at the University of Toronto before becoming a journalist, working as a parliamentary correspondent in Quebec City and Washington, D.C. for The Globe and Mail and as a journalist and parliamentary reporter for the Montreal Gazette in Ottawa, Ontario.

In 1982, Johnson was made a Member of the Order of Canada with the citation that his "daily reports from Quebec on social, cultural, and political affairs have given Anglophone readers new insights into the problems and aspirations of Francophones and have contributed notably to Canadian unity." He wrote about the role that attitudes and misconceptions have played in the history of the Quebec sovereignty movement.

Johnson was elected president of the lobby group Alliance Quebec in 1998, serving a controversial term until 2000. During that term, he refused to meet with government officials, held two small demonstrations against the Charter of the French Language, added clauses to the group's constitution denouncing hypothetical declarations of independence by the Quebec government, and supported the election of members of the tiny Equality Party to the group's board of directors. In protest, 20 members of the board of directors and most staff members resigned, while six affiliated groups severed their ties, calling his leadership style overly confrontational. Donations and government funding decreased, but membership increased during his tenure. As president of the association recognized by the federal government to defend Quebec's official language minority, Johnson insisted on marching in Montreal's Saint-Jean-Baptiste Day parade in 1998, over the objections of the organizers and the police; during the parade, the Entartistes threw a cream pie in his face.

In 2005, Johnson's Stephen Harper and the Future of Canada, about the then Leader of the Official Opposition and later Prime Minister of Canada, was published. He also translated Young Trudeau, a 2006 biography of former Prime Minister Pierre Elliott Trudeau, originally written in French by Max and Monique Nemni, into English.

Johnson was a life member of the Parliamentary Press Gallery.

== Bibliography ==
- Anglophobie Made in Québec (1991) ISBN 2-7604-0399-8
- A Canadian Myth, Quebec, between Canada and the Illusion of Utopia (1994) ISBN 1-895854-08-3
- Stephen Harper and the Future of Canada (2005). Douglas Gibson Books. ISBN 0-7710-4350-3
