= Lewis MacKenzie =

Canadian general

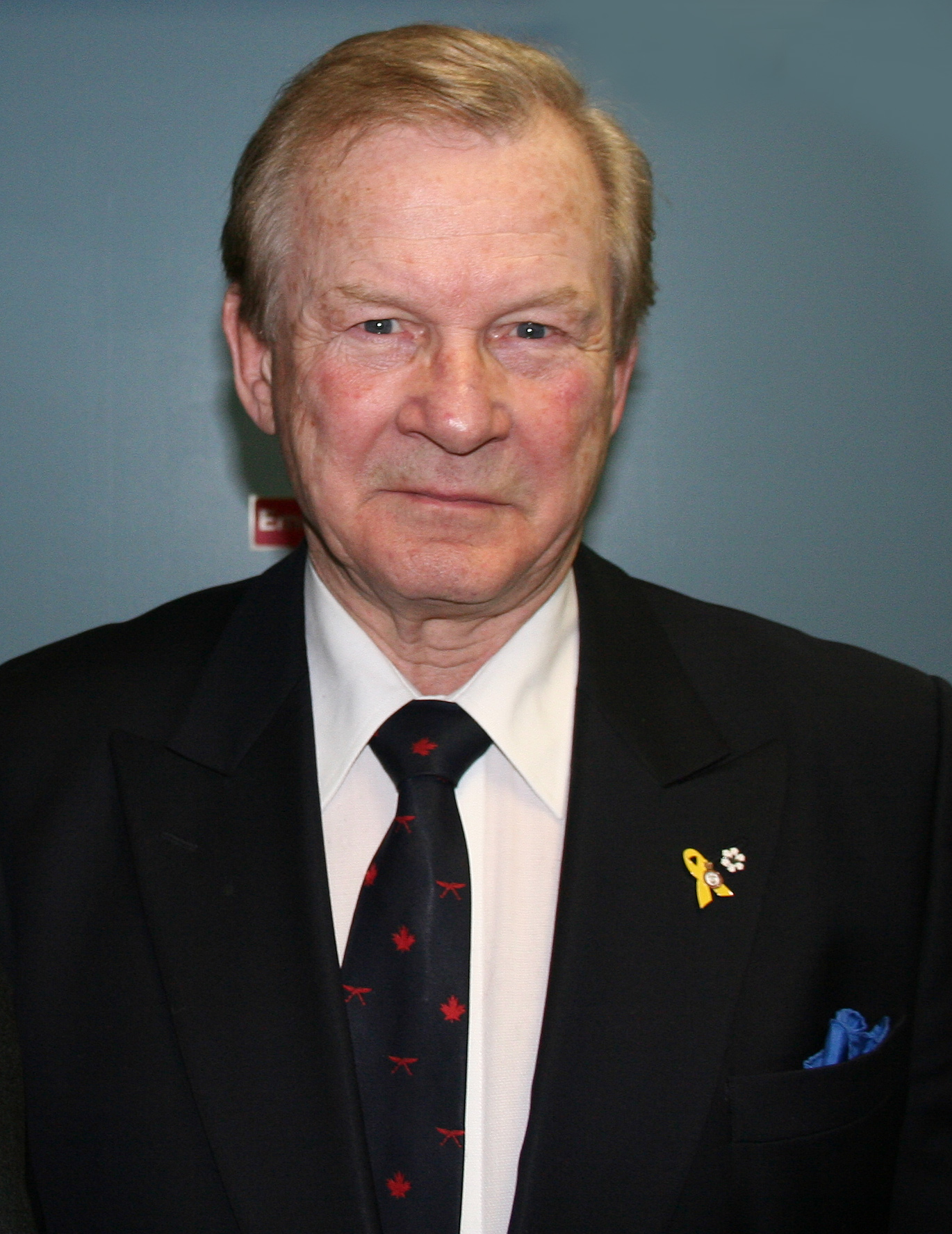
- Major General MacKenzie in 2010
- Born: Lewis Wharton MacKenzie; 30 April 1940 (age 86); Truro, Nova Scotia, Canada
- Military career
- Allegiance: Canada
- Branch: Canadian Army
- Service years: 1960–1993
- Rank: Major General
- Conflicts: Somalia Civil War: Operation Deliverance; Somalia Affair; Bosnian War: Siege of Sarajevo
- Awards: Order of Canada, Order of Ontario, Meritorious Service Cross, Canadian Forces' Decoration

Lewis Wharton MacKenzie CM, MSC, OOnt, CD (born 30 April 1940) is a Canadian retired major general, author and media commentator. MacKenzie is known for establishing and commanding Sector Sarajevo as part of the United Nations Protection Force (UNPROFOR) in the former Yugoslavia in 1992. MacKenzie was criticized for his role in the Somalia Affair and for Canada's peacekeeping failures in Bosnia. He was later a vocal opponent of NATO's involvement in the Kosovo War.

== Biography ==
MacKenzie was born in Truro, Nova Scotia, the son of Eugene and Shirley MacKenzie (nee Wharton). He was raised in nearby Princeport. He is named after his great uncle, Liverpool, Nova Scotia schooner captain Lewis Wharton. MacKenzie's forefather Israel Wharton fought as a United Empire Loyalist in the American Revolutionary War.

== Military career ==
MacKenzie enlisted with The Queen's Own Rifles of Canada and was commissioned in 1960. During his Canadian army career, MacKenzie served nine years in West Germany with NATO forces and had nine peacekeeping tours of duty with the United Nations in six different mission areas – the Gaza Strip (1963 and 1964), Cyprus (1965,1971 and 1978), Vietnam, Egypt, Central America (1990–91, commanding the United Nations Observer Mission) and the former Yugoslavia (1992–1993).

Between peacekeeping missions MacKenzie served as an instructor at the Canadian Forces Command and Staff College (1979–82) and as director of army training at St. Hubert, Que. (1983–85). As commander of the Canadian Forces Base in Gagetown, N.B. (1988–90) he was responsible for training officers at the Combat Training Centre. In 1985, he was appointed director of Combat-Related Employment for Women and, in 1991, he was appointed deputy commander of the Canadian Army's Land Force Central Area.

Following his return from the Balkans in October 1992, MacKenzie was appointed commander of the army in Ontario. He retired from the Canadian Forces in 1993, after a 33-year career.

He was the first Canadian, military or civilian, to be awarded a second Meritorious Service Cross. The second was Brigadier-General Guy Laroche in October 2010.

== Somalia Affair ==
Lewis MacKenzie was criticised by the Somalia Commission of Inquiry for his contribution to the Somalia Affair after Canadian Forces in Somalia committed human rights abuses and breaches of international humanitarian law and members of the Canadian command were found to have engaged in a subsequent cover-up.

The Commission observed that MacKenzie testified in an honest and straightforward manner; it did not always accept everything that he said but accepted that he offered the truth as he saw it. It found that his superiors' desire to parade his successes as a bona fide hero of the Canadian Forces had impaired his ability to supervise and control matters that were his core responsibilities.

The Commission found that MacKenzie had failed adequately to investigate the significant leadership and discipline problems in the Canadian Airborne Regiment, to inform himself of the problems and to take decisive remedial steps to ensure they were adequately resolved. In addition, it found that he did not adequately monitor the Regiment's training to ensure its development as a cohesive unit or make adequate provisions for the troops to be trained or tested on its newly developed Rules of Engagement and failed to direct and supervise the training of the Canadian Joint Force Somalia personnel in the Law of Armed Conflict for peace support operations.

The Commission further ruled that MacKenzie had important obligations as a commander and so bore responsibility for the failures that attached to the discharge of those obligations. His role was pivotal and despite the fact that he was necessarily absent from his post due to obligations condoned by his superiors, errors in the chain of command below him remained his responsibility and flowed upwards from him to the highest levels of the command structure.

== Bosnian War ==
In February 1992, MacKenzie was named chief of staff of the United Nations peacekeeping force in former Yugoslavia, tasked with supervising the cease-fire in Croatia. The force headquarters were located in Sarajevo, the capital of Bosnia and Herzegovina. In April 1992, the Bosnian war broke out. MacKenzie created and assumed command of the peacekeeping force's Sector Sarajevo in May 1992. He used his UN force to open Sarajevo Airport for the delivery of humanitarian aid. Using the media as a means of trying to help restore peace, MacKenzie became an international celebrity. MacKenzie returned from the Balkans in October 1992 in controversial circumstances. As a member of the Canadian armed forces he was precluded from commenting on government policy. After criticising the United Nations' inability to command, control, and support its peacekeeping forces, he retired from the military in March 1993.

=== Criticism of UNPROFOR neutrality in Sarajevo ===
Criticism of MacKenzie’s role in Sarajevo has also focused on the practical effects of UNPROFOR’s neutrality during the opening phase of the siege. In April 1992, before Sector Sarajevo was formally established, JNA units were reported to have created a buffer zone in the Ilidža-area settlements of Sokolović Kolonija, Hrasnica and Butmir, between SDS forces and Bosnian MUP units and self-organized defenders of the city. MacKenzie created Sector Sarajevo in May 1992 and concentrated on reopening Sarajevo Airport for humanitarian aid, a task later supported by Security Council Resolution 761, which authorized UNPROFOR to secure the airport and the delivery of humanitarian assistance while calling on all parties not to seek military advantage. Critics argued that this policy preserved an unequal military status quo, since the arms embargo imposed by Resolution 713 remained in force while JNA and Bosnian Serb forces retained overwhelming heavy weapons around Sarajevo, leaving Bosnian government defenders at a structural disadvantage. Writers such as Carol Off later described MacKenzie as a prominent example of the “moral equivalency” approach to Bosnia, arguing that such neutrality could favor the aggressor in a campaign of ethnic cleansing.

=== Allegations concerning UNPROFOR personnel ===
In November 1993, The Washington Post, citing a six-month investigation by Newsday, reported allegations that UNPROFOR personnel had visited Sonja's Kon-Tiki, a Serb-run restaurant and boardinghouse in Vogošća, during the summer and autumn of 1992, while Muslim and Croat women were allegedly being detained and sexually exploited there. The article stated that Newsday had interviewed several former UN officers, including MacKenzie, who had commanded Sector Sarajevo earlier in 1992, and reported that each said responsibility for investigating allegations of detention camps lay elsewhere. The article also noted that a United Nations commission of inquiry was examining allegations that UN personnel had visited the site and sexually exploited detained women, while the identities and units of the personnel allegedly involved remained unknown.

=== Views on Srebrenica ===
MacKenzie has written and lectured on his experiences in the former Yugoslavia questioning the numbers killed in the Srebrenica massacre, an event that came after his period of service in the area.

Srđa Pavlović of the University of Alberta, a Serbian-Montenegrin historian specializing in the political and cultural history of the South Slavs during the 19th and 20th centuries, wrote that "(s)ince mid-1990s the denying of the Srebrenica genocide has been a main feature of all of General MacKenzie's public addresses on the breakup of Yugoslavia", adding that the "majority of scholars specializing in the Balkan history and the breakup of Yugoslavia view Major General MacKenzie as a promoter of a narrative that denies Serbia's responsibility in that bloody breakup and as someone who disputes the evidence of genocide committed in Srebrenica that was presented to the ICTY in The Hague"

MacKenzie has challenged the findings of the International Criminal Tribunal for the former Yugoslavia (ICTY) and, in 2005, contested the conclusions and reasoning of the Appeal Chamber's 2004 judgment in the Krstić case that the crime of genocide was perpetrated at Srebrenica in July 1995. He has also disputed that Srebrenica ever was a UN Safe area, and argued that the demilitarization requirements imposed on both the Serb side (surrounding Srebrenica) and the Bosniak side (inside the enclave) were never fulfilled. Critics have argued that MacKenzie’s emphasis on Srebrenica’s disputed demilitarization and his claim that it was not a genuine United Nations "safe area" echoed revisionist interpretations that framed the VRS assault as a response to Bosniak military activity rather than as part of a genocidal operation. This interpretation is at odds with the findings of the ICTY Appeals Chamber in the Krstić case, which held that Bosnian Serb forces committed genocide at Srebrenica and that Bosnian Muslim men, including prisoners, civilians, elderly men and boys, were deliberately and methodically killed on the basis of their identity.

The 2000 book The Lion, the Fox, and the Eagle by Carol Off, which devotes a third of its content to MacKenzie's role in Yugoslavia, claims that MacKenzie was willfully ignorant of the Bosnian political situation and was manipulated into being a vehicle of "pro-Serb propaganda".

=== SERBNET funding controversy ===
In 1993, investigative reporter and Pulitzer Prize–winning journalist Roy Gutman accused Mackenzie of having two trips to Washington D.C., one to speak in front of the Heritage Foundation and the other to appear as an expert witness for the House of Representatives Armed Services Committee, funded by SERBNET, a Serbian-American lobbyist group. In a telephone interview with Gutman, MacKenzie responded, "It wouldn't surprise me if there was some Serbian involvement considering who initiated the contract; however I would be very disappointed if that were the case." The day after the interview, an article appeared in Newsday suggesting that MacKenzie was on the Serbian payroll. When MacKenzie confirmed the source of the funds was indeed SERBNET, he donated the entire fee to the Canadian Federation of Aids Research (CANFAR). However, UN officials ultimately criticised his "lack of judgment" in the matter.

== Post-Military ==
=== Media ===
MacKenzie is the author of two books: Peacekeeper: Road to Sarajevo and Soldiers Made Me Look Good: A Life in the Shadow of War. He also writes short essays about military affairs, most often in The Globe and Mail.

He is frequently sought by Canadian broadcast media as a security and military affairs commentator.

In 2005, following the appointment of former Lieutenant-General Roméo Dallaire as a Liberal senator, MacKenzie wrote an editorial in The Globe and Mail entitled "Roméo, Roméo, wherefore art thou partisan?" arguing that Dallaire had compromised his previous stance by endorsing the Liberal Party's position on intervention in Sudan.

On 19 April 2010, MacKenzie was interviewed on CTV's Power Play in relation to accusations by Ahmadshah Malgarai, a translator, who witnessed interrogations in which a witness allegedly recounted that the Canadian military murdered a 17-year-old Afghan. MacKenzie dismissed those accusations as "crap" and "insulting" to the Canadian military, while he viewed the denial by the Canadian military as credible. Amir Attaran, a law professor and lawyer for Malgarai disagreed with Mackenzie, arguing that instead of comparing credibility, the military must release the records of detainee interrogations to Parliament, so that Parliament may determine what occurred, based upon the available facts. According to Attaran, it is a legal requirement that the documents regarding detainee interrogations be produced, while they need not be made public. MacKenzie called it "ridiculous" and "ludicrous" to table such documents in Parliament and that, furthermore, he was "not concerned" about the legal requirement to do so. Near the end of the interview, MacKenzie verbally attacked Dr. Attaran: "Last time I checked, in various polls being done across Canada, the Canadian Forces are at the very top of trustworthiness with the Canadian population. I won't mention where lawyers were slated."

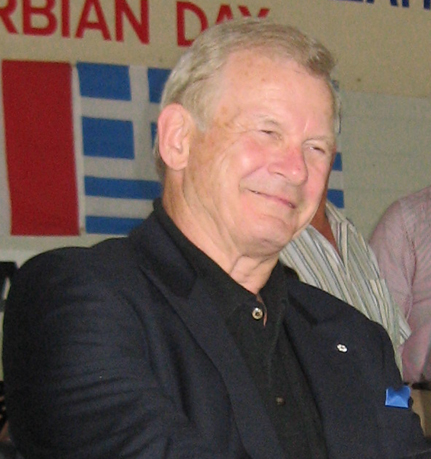
Mackenzie at Serbian Day in Niagara Falls, 2008

MacKenzie is interviewed in two documentary films by Serbian-Canadian film-maker Boris Malagurski: Kosovo: Can You Imagine? (2009) and The Weight of Chains (2011). He also contributed to the Canadian documentary If I Should Fall, which focuses on the Canadian military experience in Afghanistan since 9/11.

In 2021, Mackenzie was announced as the Honorary Commander of the Fort Henry Guard, based out of Fort Henry National Historic Site in Kingston, Ontario, and held the position until 2024.

=== Politics ===
In the 1997 federal election, MacKenzie was Progressive Conservative candidate for Parliament for the central Ontario riding of Parry Sound-Muskoka. Visiting the riding, Tory leader Jean Charest rhetorically asked a crowd of supporters whether MacKenzie or Sheila Copps would be a better Deputy Prime Minister, but later explained that this was an example rather than his party's selection. The Tories improved their standing and regained official party status, though MacKenzie finished second to Liberal incumbent Andy Mitchell.

Around 2011, MacKenzie unsuccessfully advocated for a plan to revive and modernize the Avro Canada Arrow interceptor aircraft as an alternative to the Lockheed Martin Lightning II multirole fighter then being considered for Canadian service. MacKenzie said he was not working for Bourdeau Industries, the private proposer of the plan, but governmental accountability advocate Duff Conacher, interviewed by the CBC, questioned MacKenzie's activity as a possible conflict of interest and expressed concern that it was possible for him to deliver a company's proposal to the government without being a registered lobbyist.

==== Electoral record ====
1997 Canadian federal election: Parry Sound—Muskoka
Party	Candidate	Votes	%	±%	Expenditures
Liberal	Andy Mitchell	17,752	41.60	−2.39	$50,060
Progressive Conservative	Lewis MacKenzie	11,435	26.79	+6.13	$57,680
Reform	Peter Spadzinski	10,909	25.56	−2.71	$37,010
New Democratic	Carl Wirth	1,700	3.98	−0.77	$9,543
Green	Glen Hodgson	513	1.20		$1,385
Canadian Action	Jackie Raney	236	0.55		$1,277
Natural Law	Rick Alexander	133	0.31		$0
Total valid votes		42,678	100.00		
Rejected, unmarked and declined ballots		135	0.32	−0.15	
Turnout		42,813	69.11	+0.01	
Electors on the lists		61,951			
Percentage change figures are factored for redistribution.
Sources: Official Results, Elections Canada and Financial Returns, Elections Canada.

== Honours ==
In 1993 he was that year's recipient of the Vimy Award, from the "Conference of Defence Associations Institute".

In 2006, he was made a Member of the Order of Canada.
