= Canadian Parliamentary Press Gallery =

Association that oversees responsibilities of Canadian journalists at Parliament Hill

- Tribune de la presse parlementaire
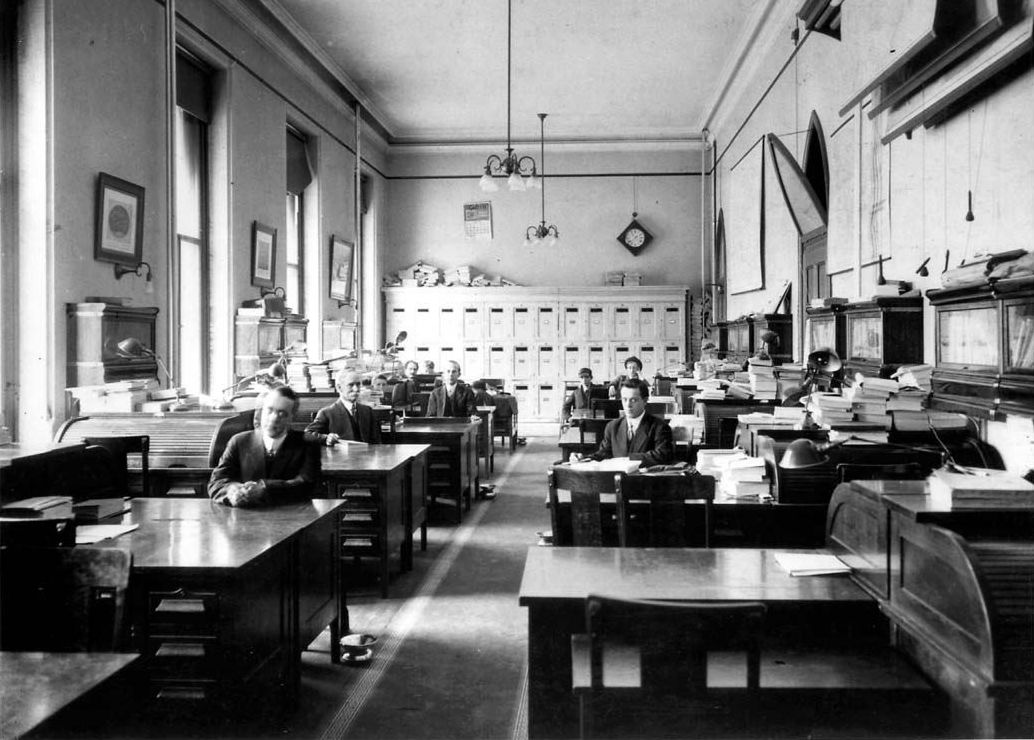
- Parliamentary Press Gallery offices in 1916
- Formation: 1866; 160 years ago
- Type: Voluntary association
- Headquarters: National Press Building
- Location(s): 150 Wellington Street; Ottawa, Ontario
- Website: www.press-presse.ca

The Canadian Parliamentary Press Gallery (French: Tribune de la presse parlementaire) is an association established to oversee rules and responsibilities of Canadian journalists when at Parliament Hill. The headquarters of the organization is the National Press Building at 150 Wellington Street. Each province of Canada also has its own press gallery.

== History ==
The organization was formed in 1866 by Thomas White. Before Hansard was introduced in 1875, records were dependent upon the newspapers of the time.

During the early years of the association, the members were associated with political parties. Membership of the gallery is determined by the association, but the final decision lies with the Speaker of the House of Commons.

The first woman member of the association was Genevieve Lipsett.

== Canadian Parliamentary Press Gallery Dinner ==
The Canadian Parliamentary Press Gallery's most high-profile activity is the Canadian Parliamentary Press Gallery dinner, which is traditionally attended by most prime ministers and covered by the news media. The most recent prime minister to not attend the event is Stephen Harper.

The Charles Lynch Award is an annual award presented at the Parliamentary Press Gallery Dinner to a Canadian journalist in recognition of outstanding coverage of national issues as selected by their colleagues in the Canadian Parliamentary Press Gallery.

Many politicians and leaders, including Jack Layton, Carolyn Parrish, and Michaëlle Jean, have attended the dinner. In 2005, former prime minister Brian Mulroney attended the event. At the 2015 edition, Green Party leader Elizabeth May had a controversial speech at the event. In 2016, at the 150th anniversary of the Canadian Parliamentary Press Gallery, prime minister Justin Trudeau and his wife, Sophie Grégoire Trudeau (wore Kim Smiley), staged a skit. The Governor General of Canada, David Johnston, also spoke that year. In 2018, Conservative leader Andrew Scheer attended the event. In 2025, prime minister Mark Carney, Green Party Leader Elizabeth May, and interim NDP leader Don Davies attended the dinner. In addition, Conservative leader Pierre Poilievre and comedian Chris Wilson appeared at dinner.

== See also ==
- Press gallery
- Media in Canada
- List of Canadian journalists
