= Carl Maxey =

American lawyer, athlete and politician (1924–1997)

- Born: June 23, 1924; Tacoma, Washington, U.S.
- Died: July 17, 1997 (aged 73); Spokane, Washington, U.S.
- Education: Gonzaga University ('51 J.D.)
- Occupations: trial attorney, civil rights advocate
- Political party: Democratic
- Children: 2

Carl Maxey was an American trial lawyer and civil rights leader and former collegiate athlete. First rising to prominence as a standout boxer nicknamed "King Carl" for Gonzaga University, he went undefeated with a 32–0 record in his college career and making Gonzaga co-champions of the 1950 NCAA Boxing Championship. After graduating from the Gonzaga University School of Law, becoming the first African-American to do so, he also became the first African-American in Spokane to complete the bar examination.

Maxey put his skills to work in fighting many cases involving racial discrimination in Spokane, gaining a reputation as a civil rights leader as well as a trial lawyer, taking many cases on a pro bono basis, becoming a force in the fight for equality under the law in Spokane and Washington as a whole. In 1964, during the Freedom Summer, Carl Maxey traveled to Mississippi to help Blacks register to vote and worked and marched alongside Stokely Carmichael and Martin Luther King Jr. Among the trials, he is most well-known for his defense of the "Seattle Seven" in an anti-Vietnam-War protest trial.

In politics, Maxey was a onetime Senate candidate, running in the Democratic primaries to unseat Henry M. Jackson on an anti-war platform and also for vice president alongside Eugene McCarthy on an independent ticket.

At his death in 1997, Carl Maxey's obituary was headlined in The New York Times with "Type A Gandhi" and was one of the most influential figures in the Inland Northwest at the time and one of the most prominent lawyers and civil rights advocates in the country.

== Early life ==
Born in 1924 to a single mother in Tacoma, Washington, he was raised as an orphan in Spokane, Washington, where he resided with his adoptive parents until his father left when he was four-years old and his mother fell ill and later died of heart failure. He had a brief stint living at the Spokane Children's Home orphanage until they stopped caring for African-American children, after which he and another African-American boy, Milton Burns, were surrendered to the Spokane County Juvenile Detention Center as a refuge of last resort. After three months at the juvenile detention center, both of the children were taken in by a Jesuit priest, Father Cornelius E. Byrne to live at the Coeur d'Alene Mission of the Sacred Heart Indian school in Desmet, Idaho.

At the Mission, Maxey excelled in the classroom and flourished athletically as well, where he became the most valuable player on the baseball, basketball, and football teams. Father Bryne also introduced young Carl to the sport of boxing, even arranging boxing bouts for the children at area logging and mining camps. Carl fought his first boxing match at one such event at age 13, winning the match against his 33 year old opponent. After graduating from the Mission school at age 15, Father Bryne arranged for Maxey to attend Gonzaga High School, the Catholic prep school associated with Gonzaga University in Spokane, on a full ride scholarship.

Upon graduating from high school in 1942, Carl entered to serve in the U.S. Army during World War II, where he wished to join the U.S. Army Air Corps to become a pilot, but instead became a private in a medical battalion because the Army Air Corps barred entry to African-Americans; Maxey was horrified by the injustices he saw on the military bases in the Jim Crow South, saying his "social awareness was born in the outrageously segregated Army." Back home in Spokane at age 21, he decided to commit himself to become a lawyer.

== College years ==
After leaving the service, Maxey went to the University of Oregon on a track scholarship in 1946, but returned to Spokane instead to attend Gonzaga University on a boxing scholarship and pursue his Juris Doctor degree.

In the ring, Maxey was a formidable boxer with his tall stature and intimidating presence. Gaining the moniker "King Carl", he went undefeated in his collegiate career, garnering a 32–0 record and giving Gonzaga a share of the 1950 lightweight NCAA Boxing Championship, its first national title in any sport. Maxey became the first African-American man to graduate from the Gonzaga School of Law in 1951.

== Death and legacy ==
Carl Maxey died by suicide in his Spokane home on July 17, 1997, of a self-inflicted gunshot wound to the head the day before he was expected to announce his retirement at age 73. His wife, Lou, had discovered him in the bedroom at 6:45 in the morning; no note was found indicating a motivation. According to his family, Carl was in good health, but his demeanor had noticeably changed in the weeks leading up to his death, with his wife reporting that he had seemed bothered about his upcoming retirement from the courtroom. Childhood friend, Milton Burns, who visited Maxey a few days prior to his death said Carl seemed exhausted, confiding in him that he had been a lawyer for 46 years and felt he needed to get out.

In Spokane, Carl Maxey is honored with a building bearing his name in the East Central neighborhood, the Carl Maxey Center, which opened in 2017 is a non-profit organization which seeks to empower and support the Black community.

== Honors ==
Carl Maxey has received numerous rewards:

- 1982 - William O. Douglas Bill of Rights Award from the Washington State Chapter of the American Civil Liberties Union
- 1988 - Charles A. Goldmark Award from the Legal Foundation of Washington
- 1988 - Gonzaga Athletic Hall of Fame
- 1993 - Gonzaga Law Medal from the Gonzaga University School of Law
