= National Press Building =

National Press Building may refer to:

- National Press Building (Ottawa), which houses the Canadian Parliamentary Press Gallery
- National Press Building (Washington, DC), which houses the National Press Club of the United States
