= Lions and foxes =

Lions and foxes may refer to:

- Lions and foxes, an analogy used in The Prince by Machiavelli
- Lions and foxes, Machiavelli's analogy expanded on in The Mind and Society by Vilfredo Pareto

== See also ==
- The Lion and the Fox, fable by Aesop
- The Fox and the Sick Lion, another separate fable by Aesop
- The Lion, the Bear and the Fox, fable by Aesop
- The Lion, the Fox & the Eagle, non-fiction book by Canadian journalist Carol Off
