= Rachel Giese =

Canadian journalist

Rachel Giese is a Canadian journalist, who won the Shaughnessy Cohen Prize for Political Writing in 2019 for her book Boys: What It Means to Become a Man. Currently the editorial director of LGBT news website Daily Xtra, her work has also appeared in The Grid, The Walrus, the Toronto Star, Chatelaine, The Globe and Mail, Toronto Life, Canadian Business, Hazlitt and Flare. She has taught feature journalism writing at Ryerson University, and has been heard on CBC Radio as a guest host of Q, Day 6 and The Sunday Edition.

An out lesbian, she lives in Toronto with her partner Jenn Miller and their son.
