= Doug Saunders =

Canadian journalist

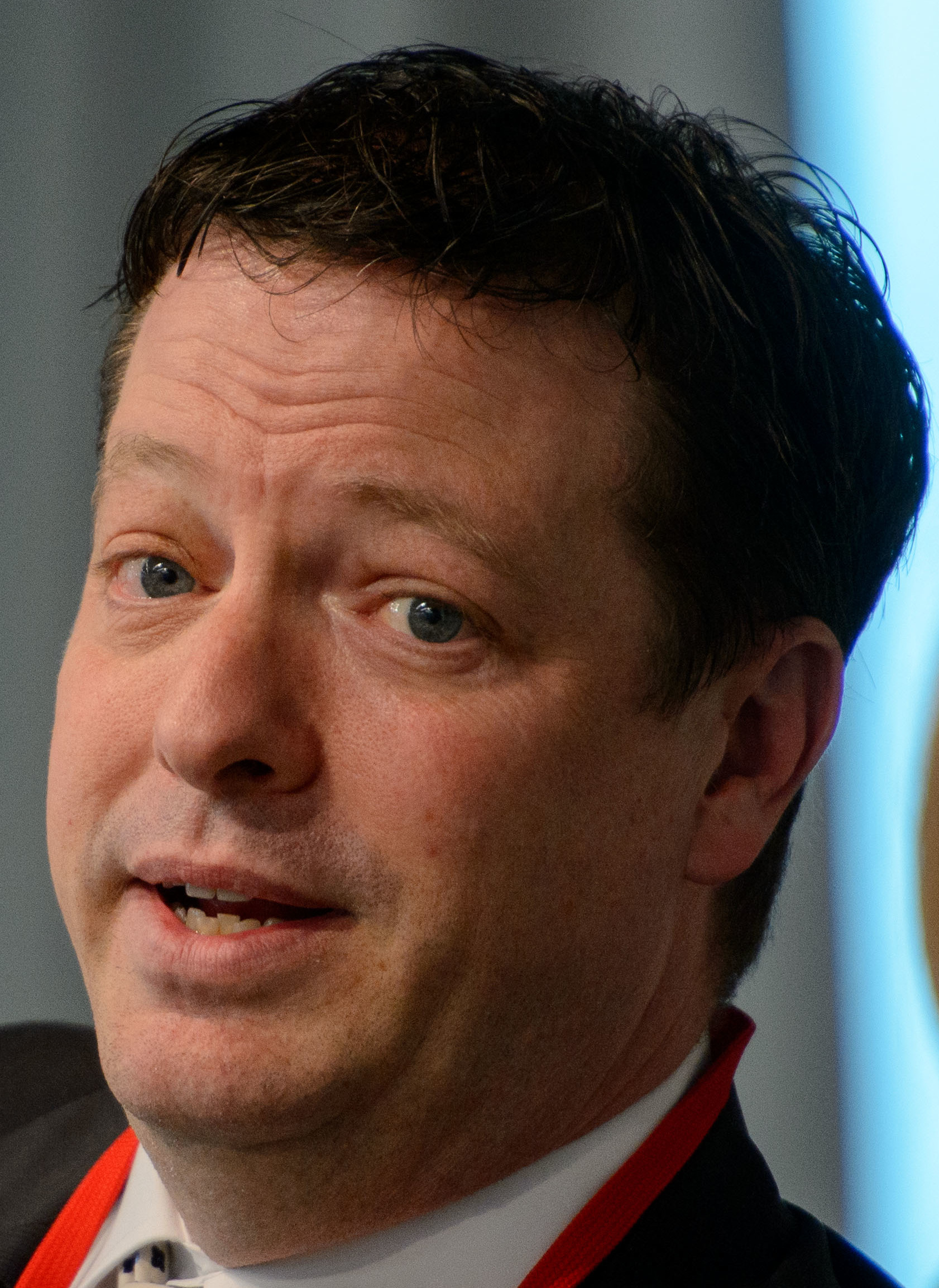
- Born: 1967; Hamilton, Ontario
- Occupation: Writer

Douglas Richard Alan Saunders (born 1967) is a British and Canadian journalist and author, and columnist for The Globe and Mail, a newspaper based in Toronto, Ontario, Canada. He is the newspaper's international-affairs columnist, and a long-serving foreign correspondent formerly based in London and Los Angeles, and is the author of three books focused on cities, migration and population. During 2019 to 2021 he was a Berlin-based resident fellow with the Robert Bosch Academy, and he currently resides in Toronto.

== Biography ==
Saunders, a citizen of the United Kingdom and Canada, was born in the city of Hamilton, Ontario, educated in Toronto at York University. In his early twenties he was the Ottawa-based national bureau chief and writer for the Canadian University Press wire service.

In the early 1990s he built a career in what was then the new field of online research and computer-assisted reporting for various Canadian journalists. He briefly worked as an editor for the left-leaning This Magazine. In 1995 he joined the Globe and Mail as an editorial writer and feature writer. In 1999, he became the paper's correspondent in Los Angeles. He moved to London to become the paper's European Bureau Chief in 2004. He has spent extensive time writing from Europe, Turkey, Iran, the Indian subcontinent, Asia and North Africa, including substantial reporting from Libya, Egypt and Tunisia during the Arab revolutions of 2011, and in Ukraine during its 2013-14 upheavals. He is married to the writer Elizabeth Renzetti.

His column generally appears in the newspaper's Opinion section, though regularly runs in the main news section as analysis of breaking international news. From 2012 to 2015, he also served as the newspaper's online opinion editor, a position he used to create the Globe Debate online opinion-and-debate portal (now known as Globe Opinion).

Saunders has won the National Newspaper Award on seven occasions: in 1998, 1999, and 2000 for critical writing; in 2006 and 2013 for column writing; in 2024 for international reporting and Journalist of the Year. In 2008, he was shortlisted for the award in international reporting, for a series of investigative articles on the state of the middle class around the world. He has also been shortlisted for the Canadian National Magazine Awards, in Public Issues.

His works have been influential in the fields of urban planning and architecture. In 2016 he was awarded the Schelling Prize for Architectural Theory. He was also a co-designer of the Germany pavilion in the 2016 Venice Architecture Biennale; the pavilion was designed as a building-sized illustration of Saunders' book Arrival City.

== Books ==
Saunders first book was Arrival City (2011), in which he visited 20 locations on five continents to study the effects of the final wave of rural-urban migration on the cities of the world. It was the winner of the $35,000 Donner Prize, one of the five finalists for the 2011 Lionel Gelber Prize, and for the Shaughnessy Cohen Prize for Political Writing. In 2015, Arrival City was on the 15-book longlist for the CBC's Canada Reads competition.

The book was published in autumn of 2010 by Heinemann Publishers in Britain, Knopf in Canada, De Bezige Bij in the Netherlands (under the title De Trek Naar De Stad), and Allen & Unwin in Australia and New Zealand, in 2011 by Pantheon Books in USA, Karl Blessing Verlag in Germany, and Rye Field Publishing in Chinese (complex) and by DVS Editora of Brazil in Portuguese. In 2012 it was published in China by Hangzhou MatrixBook, the country's first non-government-owned publisher (it was their first title); in autumn of 2012 it was published in French-language countries by Éditions du Seuil in France and Éditions du Boréal in Québec; it was published in Spanish by Debate/Mondadori in February 2014.

In 2012, his The Myth of the Muslim Tide was published in Canada by Knopf, in the United States by Vintage and in Germany by Blessing Verlag, and in 2013 in Sweden. The book is presented as a counterargument to works by such figures as Thilo Sarrazin, Mark Steyn, Bruce Bawer, and to political movements the like of Geert Wilders, which argue that Muslim immigrants cannot be assimilated, have high population-growth rates and are poised to conquer or dominate Western civilization. Sanders claims in his introduction that the book is not a defence of Islam, which he says he does not admire or endorse, but an "impartial" look at the beliefs and activities of immigrant groups. Saunders goes on to compare the experience of Muslim immigrants—both in their integration patterns and the political reception they receive—to earlier waves of religious-minority immigrants, notably European Roman Catholics and Eastern European Ashkenazi Jews.

His third book, published in 2017, was Maximum Canada: Why 35 Million Canadians Are Not Enough. It chronicles Canada's history of underpopulation and of mass emigration, and contains a proposal to manage the growth of Canada's population to 100 million.
