= Dick Flaherty =

American football player (1900–1984)

No. 6
- Position: End

Personal information
- Born: August 8, 1900; Seattle, Washington
- Died: February 4, 1984 (aged 83); Spokane, Washington
- Listed height: 5 ft 10 in (1.78 m)
- Listed weight: 200 lb (91 kg)

Career information
- High school: Gonzaga Prep (WA)
- College: Gonzaga; Marquette

Career history
- Green Bay Packers (1926)

Career statistics
- Games played: 12
- Games started: 6
- Touchdowns: 2
- Stats at Pro Football Reference

Richard Thomas Flaherty (August 8, 1900 – February 4, 1984) was an American football end for the Green Bay Packers of the National Football League (NFL). He played college football for Gonzaga and Marquette.

== Biography ==
Flaherty was born on August 8, 1900, in Seattle, Washington. He died on February 4, 1984, at Sacred Heart Medical Center in Spokane, Washington.

== Career ==
Flaherty played with the Green Bay Packers during the 1926 NFL season. He played at the collegiate level at Marquette University and Gonzaga University.
