= Max Krause =

American football player (1909–1984)

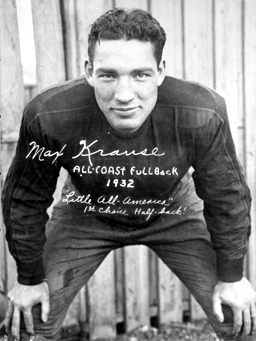
- Krause at Gonzaga

No. 25
- Position: Running back

Personal information
- Born: April 5, 1909; Spokane, Washington, U.S.
- Died: July 11, 1984 (aged 75); Spokane, Washington, U.S.

Career information
- High school: Spokane (WA) Gonzaga Prep
- College: Gonzaga

Career history
- New York Giants (1933–1936); Washington Redskins (1937–1940)

Awards and highlights
- 2× NFL champion (1934, 1937); Little All-American; First-team All-PCC (1932); Inland Northwest Sports Hall of Fame; Gonzaga University Hall of Fame (1989)

Career statistics
- Rushing yards: 613
- Receiving yards: 159
- Touchdowns: 6
- Stats at Pro Football Reference

Max Joseph Krause (April 5, 1909 – July 11, 1984) was an American football running back in the National Football League (NFL) for the New York Giants and the Washington Redskins.

== Early life ==
Krause played high school football at Gonzaga Preparatory School in Spokane, Washington, where he starred as an all-city running back and linebacker. He won 14 letters in four high school sports and in basketball he made the all-city second-team as a guard. In baseball, Krause played outfield, and in track he participated in the broad jump and ran the 220 yard low hurdles.

== College career ==
Krause stayed in Spokane for his college years, graduating from Gonzaga University with a B.A. degree in Philosophy. As fullback and halfback for the Bulldogs.^{[a]} Krause led the varsity backfield for three years.

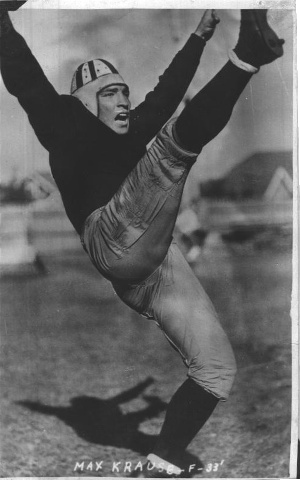
Krause punting for Gonzaga

Reporter Abe Kemp described sophomore Krause in his first varsity year at Gonzaga during a game on October 12, 1930, against St. Ignatius (now the University of San Francisco). It was a close game that included a 70-yard scoring run from scrimmage by Krause:

"They said Krause was good.... He was better than good; he was immense. Whether he ran, kicked, passed or tackled, there was a deadly and skilled earnestness about him that won the sympathy of the crowd and even the partisans."

In the buildup to the 1932 cross-state matchup between Gonzaga and the University of Washington, Clarence Dirks wrote that "A coach couldn’t ask for a better back than stocky Max Krause. He kicks, passes, tackles viciously and in an open field is as illusive as a cemetery shadow."

During his senior year (1932 season), Krause was the leading scorer on the West Coast with 88 points and 1044 yards (130.5 yards/game from scrimmage, averaging 8.5 yards per carry). He scored four touchdowns in his final college game, a 56–13 win over the University of Montana.

Krause was named 1st team All-West Coast fullback, and first choice Little All-American halfback. In the annual East–West Shrine Game, Krause started for the West at left halfback. Babe Hollingbery, famed Washington State coach and co-coach of the victorious West squad, described Krause as the "hardest-hitting back on the field" in the Shrine game.

== Professional career ==
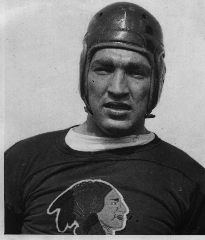
Krause with Redskins

After college, Krause played professional football for four seasons with the New York Giants. In his initial year with the Giants he had the distinction of scoring the first rushing touchdown in the NFL's first title game, the 1933 NFL Championship Game.

In 1937, Krause moved to the Washington Redskins for an additional four seasons. Coach Ray Flaherty of the Redskins, former Gonzaga star himself, invited Krause along with other former Zags to Washington, including Ed Justice and George Karamatic.

During his first year with the Redskins, the 1937 championship season, Krause was mainly a substitute and blocking back for the running back, Cliff Battles. After Battles retired in 1938 over a salary dispute, Krause started in the season opener in Philadelphia's Municipal Stadium, as described by Shirley Povich of the Washington Post:

"But the hero of the Redskins’ victory was not Sammy Baugh. It was short, stocky, swarthy chap who was given the fullback job in the absence of Cliff Battles, and his name is Max Krause. Krause it was who made three of the four Redskin touchdowns. It was Krause throwing panic into the Eagles' defense, Krause taking long passes and short passes, Krause bursting through the Eagles’ line for a 48-yard touchdown gallop in the second quarter, Krause tearing loose with a 71-yard sprint over the goal line in the third period. He was something to see today, Krause was. He had a day such as Cliff Battles, his illustrious predecessor, would have had at his best. The flying form of Krause galloping goalward was an agonizing sight before the eyes of the Eagles all afternoon."

For the 1938 season, Krause finished second in the NFL in total yards rushing (averaging 8.6 yards per carry), behind Byron "Whizzer" White of the Pittsburgh Pirates (now Steelers). For many years, Krause also held the record for the longest kickoff return for a touchdown in an NFL championship game.

The last game of Krause's Redskins and NFL career was the 1940 NFL Championship Game, when the visiting Chicago Bears beat Washington 73-0. Krause provided perhaps the only bright spot for Redskins fans on that dismal day when he ran a kickoff back for a 62-yard return (albeit not for a touchdown.)

== Life after football ==
A knee injury ended Krause's football career in 1940. After the attack on Pearl Harbor, Krause joined the United States Navy and fought in World War II. Later he established himself in the brewery business. From 1956–1983 he owned Spokane Distributors, Inc., a wholesale liquor warehouse for beer and wine.

On April 24, 1981, Krause was inducted into the Inland Northwest Sports Hall of Fame. In 1989, he was inducted into the Gonzaga Hall of Fame.

Krause died in Spokane on July 11, 1984, at the age of 75, and was interred in Holy Cross Cemetery. His wife of 42 years, Eleanor (Olson) Krause, died two years later. Their only child, Mike Krause, (b. 1954) lives and works in western Washington.

== Notes ==
a ^{a} Gonzaga had a football team from 1908 to 1941. The United States entry into World War II ended their football program.
