= Gonzaga Preparatory School =

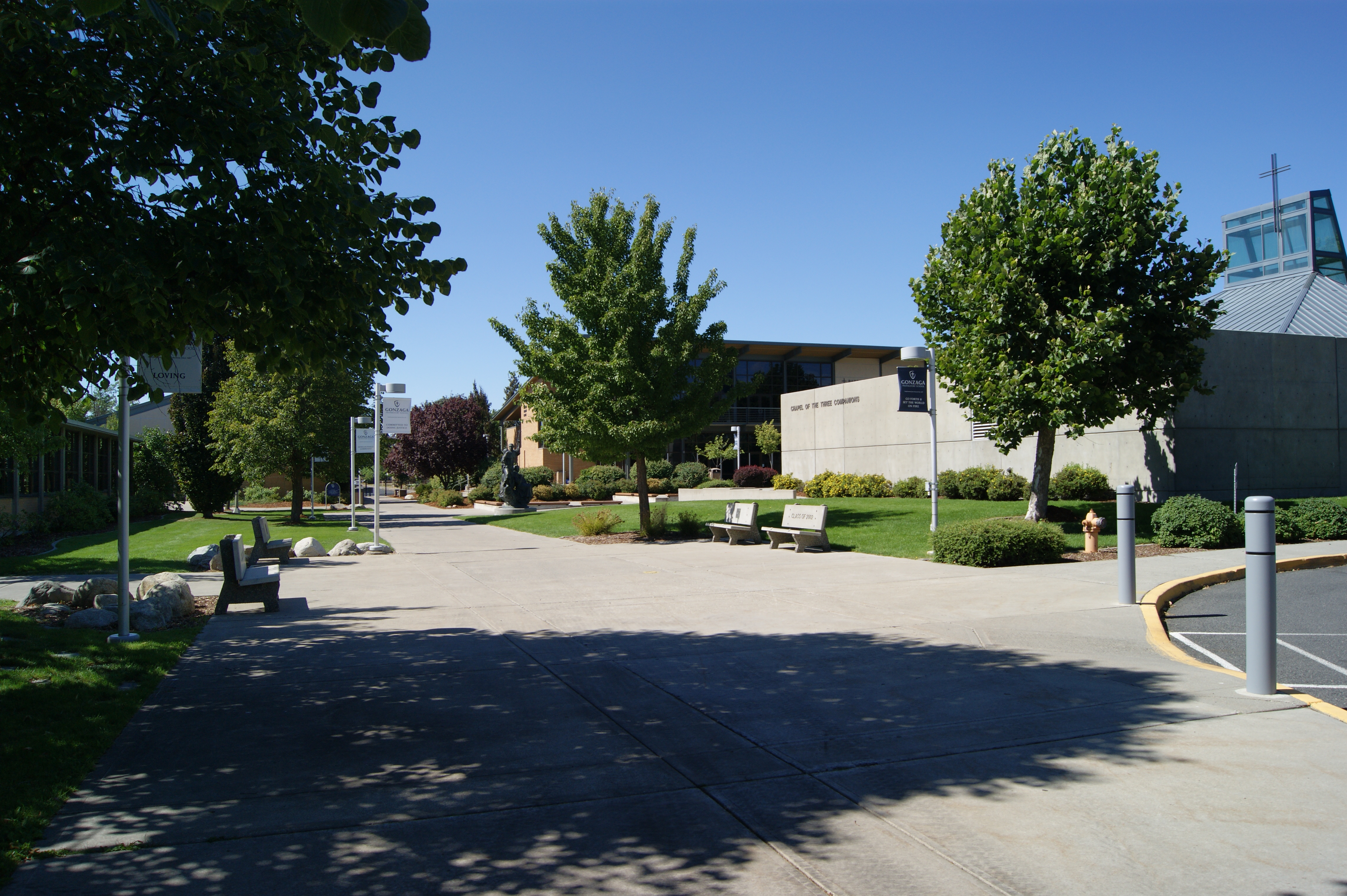

Location
- 1224 East Euclid Avenue; Spokane, Washington 99207; United States; 47°41′9″N 117°23′31″W

Information
- Type: Private
- Religious affiliation: Roman Catholic (Jesuit)
- Established: 1887; 139 years ago
- NCES School ID: 02164748
- President: Michael Dougherty
- Dean: Jack Smale, David McKenna
- Principal: Derek Duchesne
- Chaplain: Fr. JK Adams S.J.
- Grades: 9–12
- Gender: Coeducational
- Enrollment: 875 (2017-18)
- Student to teacher ratio: 12.8
- Colors: Navy and white
- Athletics conference: Greater Spokane League
- Sports: Football
- Mascot: Bullpup
- Team name: Bullpups
- Accreditation: Western Catholic Educational Association
- Yearbook: The Luigian
- Affiliation: JSN
- Athletic Director: Paul Manfred
- Elevation: 1,980 ft (604 m) AMSL
- Website: gprep.com

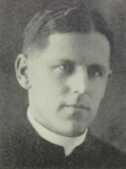
Reverend John C. McAstocker, a Jesuit, was the first principal.

Gonzaga Preparatory School in Spokane, Washington, is a private Catholic high school in the Inland Northwest. Colloquially nicknamed "G-Prep", the Jesuit school has been recognized for its college preparation education and community service.

== History ==
Gonzaga High School was founded in 1887 in the basement of the Gonzaga University administration building. In 1922, the high school became a formal department of Gonzaga University. In 1954, the school moved from the original campus to its present site in the Logan neighborhood of Spokane. In 1975, in response to changing educational conditions, Gonzaga Prep became a co-educational school. In 1992, the high school implemented the Fair Share tuition program. The school is within the Diocese of Spokane and is administered separately from the university.

The current campus was extensively remodeled in the late 1990s. In 2006, $4.4 million was allotted for the construction of a new chapel (Chapel of the Three Companions), renovation of the academic wings, and a new football field. This was followed by a $6 million upgrade of the athletic complex in 2017. Gonzaga Preparatory School was the first Jesuit school in the country to have a lay president in John Traynor. Cindy Reopelle was the first Catholic lay woman to serve as principal of Gonzaga Preparatory School.

== Christian service ==
As a part of its extensive service program, Gonzaga requires a semester course on Christian service of all seniors.

=== Food drive ===
The Gonzaga Prep Food Drive consistently gathers over 100,000 pounds of food each year before the Thanksgiving holiday. Recipients of collected groceries and turkeys include over two hundred families, the Colville Indian Reservation, the Spokane Tribe, the Morningstar Baptist Church, residents of Summit View Apartments, Second Harvest food bank, and many local food pantries.

== Athletics ==
The Gonzaga Prep Bullpups compete in the 4A classification and are part of the Greater Spokane League, a league of 17 teams from around Spokane. As a member of the 4A Greater Spokane League, the Bullpups offer athletic opportunities in eleven boys sports and eleven girls sports: for boys, football, cross country, basketball, wrestling, soccer, tennis, baseball, track, lacrosse, robotics and golf; and for girls, volleyball, soccer, robotics, cross country, basketball, tennis, softball, track, golf, lacrosse, and cheerleading. Over sixty-five percent of Gonzaga Prep's student body participates in athletics.

=== Girls' Tennis ===
G-Prep won seven straight GSL Tennis championships from 1997 to 2003. The Bullpups tennis teams went undefeated for eight years. When Lewis and Clark High School defeated G-Prep on April 13, 2003, it was the Bullpups' first loss since 1996. The team continues to experience success.

== Notable alumni ==
- Michael Baumgartner, US representative from Washington's 5th congressional district, who attended G-Prep for two years
- John D. Boswell, electronic musician
- David A. Condon, 46th mayor of Spokane (2012–2020)
- Jimmy Condon, three-sport athlete at Gonzaga University and noted Spokane physician
- Bob Crosby, jazz singer and band leader, host of The Bob Crosby Show, and brother of Bing
- Bing Crosby, singer, entertainer, and winner of the Academy Award for Best Actor for his role as Father Chuck O'Malley in 1944 film Going My Way
- Devin Culp, NFL tight end for the Tampa Bay Buccaneers
- Joe Danelo, NFL placekicker
- Timothy Egan, Pulitzer Prize-winning writer
- Robert Ferguson, nuclear physicist; first Deputy Assistant Secretary for Nuclear Energy Programs, U.S. Department of Energy (1978–1980)
- Dick Flaherty, NFL end for the Green Bay Packers (1926)
- Ray Flaherty, NFL Hall of Famer
- Tom Foley, 49th Speaker of the United States House of Representatives (1989–1995)
- Terri Givens, author and political scientist
- Samuel Grashio, Colonel in the U.S. Army Air Force who survived the Bataan Death March and participated in the only successful mass escape from a Japanese prison camp, and was awarded the Distinguished Service Cross and the Silver Star with cluster for heroism
- Steve Gleason, New Orleans Saints special teams captain and ALS activist
- Paulette Jordan, Idaho state representative and 2018 Democratic gubernatorial nominee
- Larry Koentopp, head coach of Gonzaga University baseball team and co-owner of Spokane Indians and Las Vegas Stars
- Max Krause, NFL running back
- Tim Lappano, college football player and American football coach (college football, NFL, and AFL) who had his jersey retired from Gonzaga Prep
- Mark Machtolf, head coach of Gonzaga University's men's baseball team
- Carl Maxey, trial lawyer, civil rights leader, and former collegiate athlete
- Anne McClain, NASA astronaut, engineer and lieutenant colonel in the U.S. Army
- Al Mengert, professional golfer
- Wyatt Mills, baseball player for the Boston Red Sox
- Mike Oriard, professor of English, author, and former professional football player
- Ike Petersen, NFL back for the Chicago Cardinals and Detroit Lions; first-team Little All-American (1934)
- Gary Pettigrew, NFL defensive lineman
- Art Pharmer, NFL halfback
- Mike Redmond, baseball player and manager of Miami Marlins (2013–2015)
- Bishop Sankey, running back for the University of Washington and NFL's Tennessee Titans, Minnesota Vikings, and New England Patriots
- Dick Sprague, College Football All-American defensive back, University of Washington (1950); attorney; team captain in 1952; at Harvard Law School he helped coach the football team, whose players included future U.S. Senator Ted Kennedy
- David Stockton, professional basketball player
- John Stockton, Basketball Hall of Famer and all-time NBA assists and steals leader
- Julia Sweeney, actress, comedian, and cast member of Saturday Night Live
- Chris Tormey, college football head coach
- Anton Watson, college basketball player
- Evan Weaver, linebacker for California and NFL's Arizona Cardinals
- Miriam Weeks, sex-positive feminist and pornographic actress known by stage name Belle Knox
- John Yarno, NFL center and All-American of the Idaho Vandals who attended G-Prep through junior year
