= Jacques Poitras =

Canadian writer and journalist

- Born: Jacques Andre Poitras; 1967 or 1968 (age 57–58); Moncton, New Brunswick, Canada
- Education: Carleton University (B.J., 1990), (M.J., 1991)
- Occupation: Reporter for CBC News
- Years active: 2000–present
- Website: jacquespoitras.wordpress.com

Jacques Andre Poitras (born 1967 or 1968) is a Canadian journalist and author. As New Brunswick's provincial affairs reporter for CBC News, Poitras does reporting work for politics within New Brunswick. Outside of doing reporting work, Poitras has written five non-fiction books, for which he has received multiple awards and nominations.

== Early life and career ==
Jacques Poitras was born in Moncton, New Brunswick, in either 1967 or 1968. (Note: Poitras was 43 years old as of a 27 September 2011 article by The Aquinian.) After attending Moncton High School, Poitras attended the Carleton School of Journalism, where he received his Bachelor of Journalism in 1990 and Master of Journalism in 1991. Additionally, Poitras was listed in the Deans' Honour List in 1989. After graduating, Poitras began his career in journalism as an intern staff writer for The Kingston Whig-Standard, after which worked for the English weekly newspaper Prognosis, which was based in the Czech capital Prague.

== Career ==
=== Journalism in New Brunswick ===
In 1993, after working for Prognosis, Poitras began working as a reporter for the Telegraph-Journal, a Saint John-based daily newspaper then-owned by Irving, during which he reported on Canadian Parliament affairs as a correspondent based in Ottawa. In 1999, Poitras received an Amnesty International Canada media award under the "Local/Alternative Print" category. Since 2000, Poitras has worked for CBC News as New Brunswick's provincial affairs reporter. Based in Fredericton, he does political reporting in New Brunswick, covering topics such as elections and electoral districts. Poitras has also served as the New Brunswick Legislature's press gallery president, and has done extensive reporting work on the legislature. For two consecutive years, Poitras was a recipient of RTDNA Canada's "top national feature reporting award." The National Newspaper Awards have also given attention to his work. In 2019, Poitras published an article about Blaine Higgs on The Canadian Encyclopedia.

In 2022, he participated as a mentor for the Canadian Association of Journalists' mentorship program. Poitras has also done part-time teaching at St. Thomas University. During the 2024 Atlantic Journalism Awards, Poitras, along with Danielle McCreadie and Vanessa Vander Valk, received the gold award under the "Audio" category's "Breaking News" section for their report on Progressive Conservative cabinet minister Dorothy Shephard resigning surrounding the events of Policy 713.

=== Author ===
Poitras has written five non-fiction books, two of which have been finalist nominations for the Shaughnessy Cohen Prize for Political Writing, which he was also a jurist of during the 2023 nominations. His debut book, The Right Fight: Bernard Lord and the Conservative Dilemma, was published by Goose Lane Editions in 2004. The gives a three-decade long historical recount of politics in New Brunswick and additionally covers then-Premier Bernard Lord, and was shortlisted for the Atlantic Booksellers' Choice Award. For a portion of the book, Poitras interviewed former New Brunswick Confederation of Regions Party member and Progressive Conservative MLA Tony Huntjens, who said in quotes that he "opposes duality in the education system and remains hopeful the two systems can be integrated someday," which resulted in him being criticized by the Acadian Society of New Brunswick as well as the New Brunswick Liberal Association.

In 2007, he published Beaverbrook: A Shattered Legacy, which covers the ownership dispute over the artworks in the Beaverbrook Art Gallery, an art gallery in Fredericton which was founded by Max Aitken, 1st Baron Beaverbrook. Later in 2011, he wrote the Goose Lane Editions-published Imaginary Line: Life on an Unfinished Border. In writing the book, which was a finalist nomination for the Shaughnessy Cohen Price for Political Writing, Poitras had to repeatedly cross the border and check for boundary markers, and spent a month during May 2010 interviewing residents on both sides along the border. The book covers the history of the Canada–United States border between New Brunswick and Maine, as well as the issues faced by locals due to the strengthened border regulations that resulted from the September 11 attacks.

His 2018 Pipe Dreams: The Fight for Canada’s Energy Future, published by Penguin Random House Canada, delves into the failed Energy East pipeline proposal in Canada. It was named the Petroleum History Society's 2018 Book of the Year, was a finalist nominated for the 2018 Shaughnessy Cohen Prize for Political Writing, shortlisted for the John W. Dafoe Book Prize in 2019, and was additionally a bronze medalist for the 2020 Axion Business Book Awards under the "Business Commentary" category. Michael Sobota of The Chronicle-Journal called the book an "industrial thriller," adding that Poitras' "narrative is well researched with facts, data and personal opinions from a full spectrum of those involved with or impacted by the project."

=== Irving-related work ===
Throughout the 2010s, Poitras conducted research and published work on the Irving Group of Companies and the Irving family, facing harsh pushback from the Irvings themselves. In 2014, he published Irving vs. Irving: Canada's Feuding Billionaires and the Stories They Won't Tell, described by Bruce Livesey of Canada's National Observer as detailing about "the recent history of the Irvings' media holdings, as well as the deteriorating relationship among the Irving brothers and cousins as they squabble over the empire's wealth and future direction." The book received positive reception and a National Business Book Award nomination.

On December 2, 2015, Poitras published an article about Eilish Cleary's sudden leave from her position as Chief Medical Officer of Health in New Brunswick, noting that Cleary had been studying glyphosate, a herbicide recently labelled as "probably carcinogenic to humans" by the World Health Organization's International Agency for Research on Cancer, at the time. In the article, Poitras briefly mentioned that glyphosate was used by J. D. Irving and NB Power. Two days later, Mary Keith of J. D. Irving released a "sharply worded" statement in response, calling the article a "sensational story" and accusing CBC News of presenting "an unsubstantiated conspiracy theory as fact," further claiming that CBC "falsely implied that J. D. Irving, Limited (JDI) is or was involved in some sort of conspiracy against Dr. Cleary because JDI uses glyphosate". In their statement, Irving also demanded that CBC "immediately remove the story from their website, publish a full retraction, and apologize for their appalling behavior". Poitras responded back on Twitter with a tweet stating, "We stand by our story."

Poitras has also been the target of attempts by J. D. Irving to ban him from writing about the Irvings and their operations. In 2016, J. D. Irving filed a complaint to CBC's ombudsman; a review by Jack Nagler of CBC concluded that it had no merit. In early 2017, the company filed a second complaint, this time hiring Lenczner Slaght LLP to assist in drafting the complaint. It was reviewed by Esther Enkin, a different CBC ombudsman, and dismissed a second time. According to Enkin, restricting Poitras from writing about the Irvings or using his personal Twitter account "would amount to a form of censorship". Nova Scotia-based journalist Stephen Kimber commented on the attempted sanctions from J. D. Irving against Poitras, stating his belief that Irving is trying to bully the media.

In November 2022, in a co-production with Radio-Canada’s Enquête, Poitras revealed previously unknown secrets of the Irving family’s offshore Bermuda holdings, using leaked documents from the Paradise Papers. This included how the Irvings set up a maze of Bermuda holding companies to shield billions of dollars from Canadian taxation.

== Publications ==
- The Right Fight: Bernard Lord and the Conservative Dilemma. Goose Lane Editions. 2004. ISBN 9780864923769.
- Beaverbrook : A Shattered Legacy. Goose Lane Editions. 2007. ISBN 9780864924971.
- Imaginary Line: Life on an Unfinished Border. Goose Lane Editions. 2011. ISBN 978-0864926500.
- Irving vs. Irving: Canada's Feuding Billionaires and the Stories They Won't Tell. Penguin Random House Canada. 2014. ISBN 978-0670067718.
- Pipe Dreams: The Fight for Canada's Energy Future. Canada: Viking Press. 2018. ISBN 9780735233355.

== External websites ==
- Official website
- CBC News profile
- Jacques Poitras on X
