= Erna Paris =

Canadian non-fiction author (1938–2022)

- Born: 6 May 1938; Toronto
- Died: 3 February 2022 (aged 83)
- Education: University of Toronto, University of Paris
- Occupation: Non-fiction author

Erna Paris CM (6 May 1938 – 3 February 2022) was a Canadian non-fiction author.

== Biography ==
Erna Paris was born Erna Newman in Toronto to an essentially secular Jewish family. She was the niece of classical pianist Beth Lipkin. After earning a Bachelor of Arts degree from the University of Toronto in Honours Philosophy and English, Paris moved to France for several years, where she continued her studies at the Sorbonne. She began her writing career in the 1970s as a magazine journalist and radio broadcaster/documentarist.

She was the author of seven books and the winner of twelve national and international prizes for her books, journalism, and radio documentaries. She was also a frequent contributor to the opinion page of the Globe and Mail.

Paris lived in Toronto with her second husband, Thomas M. Robinson, professor emeritus of Ancient Greek Philosophy and Classics at the University of Toronto. She had a daughter, Michelle, and a son, Roland. Paris died on 3 February 2022, at the age of 83.

== Awards and recognition ==
- 1970: Winner, Media Club of Canada, feature writing
- 1973: Winner, Media Club of Canada, radio documentary
- 1974: Winner, Media Club of Canada, feature writing
- 1974: Winner, Media Club of Canada, radio documentary
- 1981-2001, Now magazine Best Books, Long Shadows: Truth, Lies and History
- 1983: Winner, Gold Medal, National Magazine Awards
- 1990: Best Canadian Essays, Fifth House Press, The Boat People
- 1991: Winner, Bronze Medal The White Award, North America City and Regional Magazine Competition, The Boat People
- 1995: Winner, Year-End Best Books, Quill & Quire, The End of Days: Tolerance, Tyranny and the Expulsion of the Jews from Spain
- 1996: Winner, Canadian Jewish Book Awards, History, The End of Days: Tolerance, Tyranny and the Expulsion of the Jews from Spain
- 2000: Globe and Mail Best Books, Long Shadows: Truth, Lies and History
- 2001: Winner, Pearson Writers' Trust Non-Fiction Prize, Long Shadows: Truth, Lies and History
- 2001: Winner, Shaughnessy Cohen Prize for Political Writing, Long Shadows: Truth, Lies and History
- 2001: Winner, Dorothy Shoichet Prize for History, Canadian Jewish Book Awards, Long Shadows: Truth, Lies and History
- 2001: The Christian Science Monitor Best Books, Long Shadows: Truth, Lies and History
- 2001: New Statesman Best Books, Long Shadows: Truth, Lies and History
- 2002: Visiting Fellow, International Affairs Program, University of Colorado Boulder
- 2003: "The Presence of Excellence/ Vingt-Cinq Ans d'Excellence: Twenty-Five Years of Selections from the National Magazine Awards", National Magazine Awards Foundation
- 2005: "The 100 Most Important Canadian Books Ever Written" (1535-2004): Long Shadows: Truth, Lies and History, The Literary Review of Canada
- 2008: The Globe and Mail Best Books, "The Sun Climbs Slow: Justice in the Age of Imperial America"
- 2008-2009: Vice Chair, Writers' Union of Canada
- 2009: Short-List, Shaughnessy Cohen Prize for Political Writing, "The Sun Climbs Slow: Justice in the Age of Imperial America"
- 2009: "Decade in Review: Top 10 Canadian Books", "Long Shadows: Truth, Lies and History," Now magazine
- 2009: Appointed, Honorary Council, Canadian Centre for International Justice, Ottawa
- 2009-2010: Chair, Writers' Union of Canada
- 2011: "Canada's Twenty-Five Most Influential Books of Nonfiction", "Long Shadows: Truth, Lies and History", selected by the shortlisted authors for the Hilary Weston Writers' Trust Prize for Nonfiction
- 2012: World Federalist Movement-Canada World Peace Award
- 2012: Winner, Silver Medal, National Magazine Awards
- 2014: "2014 Alumni of Influence", University College, University of Toronto
- 2015: Appointed a Member of the Order of Canada

== Bibliography ==
- Jews, An Account of Their Experience in Canada. Toronto: Macmillan, 1980. ISBN 0-7715-9574-3
- Stepfamilies: Making Them Work. Toronto: Avon, 1984. ISBN 0-380-86405-3
- Unhealed Wounds: France and the Klaus Barbie Affair. Toronto: Methuen, 1985. ISBN 0-458-99820-6
- The Garden and the Gun: A Journey Inside Israel. Toronto: Lester & Orpen Dennys, 1988 ISBN 0-88619-121-1
- The End of Days: A Story of Tolerance, Tyranny, and the Expulsion of the Jews from Spain. Toronto: Lester, 1995. ISBN 1-895555-73-6
- Long Shadows: Truth, Lies and History Toronto: Knopf Canada, 2000. ISBN 0-676-97251-9
- The Sun Climbs Slow: Justice in the Age of Imperial America, Toronto: Knopf Canada, 2008. ISBN 978-0-676-97744-8
- From Tolerance to Tyranny: A Cautionary Tale From Fifteenth-Century Spain, Toronto: Cormorant Books, 2015. ISBN 978-1-77086-397--2 (New edition of The End of Days.)
