= Juliet O'Neill =

Canadian journalist

Juliet O'Neill is a Canadian journalist who was the subject of controversy when the Royal Canadian Mounted Police raided her house in 2004 in an attempt to find the source of an alleged internal leak giving her access to privileged documents related to the Maher Arar case.

== Career ==
In 1986, O'Neill was working for the Canadian Press newswire, when she caught international attention for being the only reporter to capture Sondra Gotlieb slapping her social secretary Connie Gibson Connor at a state dinner held to honour Canadian Prime Minister Brian Mulroney and US Vice President George H. W. Bush. In 2004, she was a reporter with the Ottawa Citizen at the time of the raid, and she had earlier served as a foreign correspondent in Moscow.

== House raid ==
On January 21, 2004 the Royal Canadian Mounted Police raided her house as part of an attempt to identify the leak. During the raid, police seized notebooks, files, hard drives and other materials.

In November 2004, Ontario Superior Court Judge Lynn Ratushny ruled that the sealing of the search warrants was unacceptable, although Justice of the Peace Richard Sculthorpe had given approval after the RCMP invoked the Security of Information Act. Justice Ratushny stated that the sealing of the search violated guarantees of a free press, freedom of expression and the publics right to an open court system. She ordered that a redacted copy be released to the public.

In October 2006, Ontario Superior Court Judge Ratushny struck down Section 4 of the Security of Information Act, ruling that it was "unconstitutionally vague" and broad and an infringement of freedom of expression.

All materials seized from O'Neill were ordered returned.

O'Neill was represented by attorneys Rick Dearden and Wendy Wagner from Gowlings a law firm with offices in Ottawa.

== Awards and honors ==
In 1996, O'Neill was awarded a Southam Fellowship. In 2005, she was honored with the World Press Freedom Award . In 2009 she was honored with the Charles Lynch Award for Outstanding Coverage of National Affairs.
