= Charles Lynch Award =

Canadian award in journalism

The Charles Lynch Award is an annual award presented to a Canadian journalist in recognition of outstanding coverage of national issues as selected by their colleagues in the Canadian Parliamentary Press Gallery. The award is presented each year at the Parliamentary Press Gallery Dinner.

The annual award was established in 1997 to honour the legendary Canadian journalist, author and World War II correspondent Charles Lynch.

Formerly handed out under the auspices of the National Press Club of Canada, the Charles Lynch Award is now administered by the Press Gallery itself. Rather than singling out any one achievement, the award is intended to recognize a recipient's overall reputation and respect according to their peers.

== Charles Lynch Award Recipients ==
- 1997 - Don Newman (CBC Newsworld)
- 1998 - Hugh Winsor (The Globe and Mail)
- 1999 - Daniel L'Heureux (Radio-Canada)
- 2000 - not awarded
- 2001 - not awarded
- 2002 - Craig Oliver (CTV News)
- 2003 - Susan Murray (CBC News)
- 2004 - not awarded
- 2005 - James Travers (Toronto Star)
- 2006 - Jeffrey Simpson (The Globe and Mail)
- 2007 - not awarded
- 2008 - not awarded
- 2009 - Juliet O'Neill (Postmedia News)
- 2010 - Rob Russo (Canadian Press) - Presented by Don Newman.
- 2011 - Susan Delacourt (Toronto Star) - Presented by Rob Russo and Don Newman.
- 2012 - Daniel Leblanc (The Globe and Mail)
- 2013 - No Parliamentary Press Gallery Dinner was held in 2013.
- 2014 - Robert Fife (CTV News) - Presented by Rob Russo and Don Newman.
- 2015 - Jennifer Ditchburn (Canadian Press)
- 2017 - Dean Beeby (CBC News)
- 2018 - Manon Corneiller (Le Devoir)
- 2019 - Chantal Hébert (Toronto Star)
- 2023 - Robert Fife (The Globe and Mail) and Steven Chase (The Globe and Mail) - Presented by Rob Russo.
- 2025 - Hélène Buzzetti (Les Coops de l'information)
