= Young Trudeau =

2006 biography

- Author: Max Nemni and Monique Nemni
- Publication date: May 17, 2006
- Pages: 352
- ISBN: 9780771067495

Young Trudeau: 1919-1944: Son of Quebec, Father of Canada (short title: Young Trudeau) is the intellectual biography of Pierre Trudeau, the former Prime Minister of Canada, that deals with his parents, childhood, and education in the province of Quebec from his birth in 1919 until November 1944 when he left to study at Harvard University.

Published in 2006 by Douglas Gibson Books (ISBN 0-7710-6749-6), the book was written by retired professors Max and Monique Nemni, friends and admirers of Pierre Trudeau whom he had convinced to take over as editors of Cité Libre. Max and Monique Nemni spent most of their working lives in the province of Quebec. The authors have both had numerous writings published in academic publications in both the English and French languages.

Young Trudeau is based on the large collection of private papers and personal diaries of Pierre Trudeau which he gave the authors in 1995 to write his intellectual biography and which had never before been made public. The book's back cover states that what Trudeau was taught at College Jean-de-Brebeuf and the University of Montreal, was that:

"democracy was bad and that fascism -- as represented by Mussolini and Pétain -- was good. Thus, even as a young man of twenty-three, Trudeau was ignoring the war in Europe and plotting a revolution to take Quebec out of Canada. The picture that emerges is of a Quebec elite that was raised to be pro-fascist, and where Nazi atrocities were dismissed as English (Canadian) propaganda."

The book won the Shaughnessy Cohen Prize for Political Writing in 2006.

== Studies at College Jean-de-Brebeuf ==
The Quebec government abolished the Ministry of Education in 1875 to submit to the ultramontane Roman Catholic clergy which considered education the domain of the family and the Church, not the state. (p. 31) The result was that only private secondary schools gave access to French colleges and universities and the Catholic Church controlled the French universities, and ran the orphanages, hospitals, and shelters for the aged. (p. 31)

The book recounts the influences of Trudeau's Roman Catholic upbringing and education at the Jesuit owned and run College Jean-de-Brebeuf in Montreal where students were taught that French-Canadians enjoyed a moral superiority. (p. 16 – Quote from:). The writings of the revered priest Lionel Groulx also espoused this idea of ethnic superiority. His pedagogical novel, L'Appel de la race (The Call of Race) taught that "the children of ethnically mixed marriages suffer from a form of schizophrenia because they are inhabited by two different souls." A character in Father Groulx's book exclaims: "So it is really true that the mixing of races produces cerebral disorders." (p. 15)

The book shows through Trudeau's own written words that what he was taught was unquestioned obedience to the doctrines of the Roman Catholic Church. Through priests in local churches and those in charge of the French language education system, the Church played an unparalleled role in creating Quebec's French elite. (p. 33) In 2000, René Latourelle, a priest who taught at College Jean-de Brebeuf, published Quel avenir pour le Christianisme? in which he said (p. 16/17) that "The church acted as a true dictatorship over consciences."

At College Jean-de Brebeuf, "Nationalism and religion together constituted the combined fundamental values that infused all the life of the college." (p. 46) Antisemitism was a part of college teachings and the august priest Lionel Groulx espoused his l'achat chez nous policy that warned French Canadians not to shop at Jewish-owned stores. (p. 58). Pierre Trudeau himself fully subscribed to these theories and wrote a vehemently anti-Semitic play titled Dupés (meaning "We've been had!"). His diary records that the seven-character play was "performed on May 16, 1938 at College Jean-de-Brebeuf before students and parents with great success." (p. 58)
