= Princeport =

Community in Nova Scotia, Canada

Coordinates: 45°17′25.25″N 63°28′13.52″W

Princeport in Nova Scotia

Princeport is an unincorporated community in the Canadian province of Nova Scotia, located in Colchester County.

== Bibliography ==
- Burrows, Mildred Pulsifer (1985). A history of Princeport in Colchester County. Truro, Nova Scotia: Colchester Historical Museum. pp. 47: maps, 28 cm. OCLC 16179904.
