= Max Nemni =

Canadian political scientist and writer (1935–2024)

- Born: June 13, 1935
- Died: August 29, 2024 (aged 89)
- Occupations: Political scientist, biographer
- Spouse: Monique Nemni (died 2022)
- Writing career
- Period: 1990s–2024
- Notable works: Young Trudeau, Trudeau Transformed

Max Nemni (June 13, 1935 – August 29, 2024) was a Canadian political scientist and writer, best known for a series of biographies of former Prime Minister of Canada Pierre Trudeau which he cowrote with his wife Monique Nemni.

He was a professor of political science at Université Laval, and a coeditor of Cité Libre.

The first volume of the Trudeau biography, Young Trudeau: Son of Quebec, Father of Canada, 1919-1944, won the Shaughnessy Cohen Prize for Political Writing in 2006. The second volume, Trudeau Transformed: The Shaping of a Statesman, 1944-1965, was a shortlisted nominee for the same award in 2011. A third volume, focusing on Trudeau's career in elected politics after 1965, is slated for future publication.

Nemni died on August 29, 2024, at the age of 89.

== Works ==
- Young Trudeau: Son of Quebec, Father of Canada, 1919-1944 (2006, ISBN 978-0771067495)
- Trudeau Transformed: The Shaping of a Statesman, 1944-1965 (2011, ISBN 978-0771051258)
