= Monique Nemni =

Canadian linguist and writer (1935/1936 – 2022)

- Born: May 27, 1936; Cairo, Egypt
- Died: 2 November 2022 (aged 86); Naples, Italy
- Occupations: Linguist, biographer
- Spouse: Max Nemni
- Writing career
- Notable works: Young Trudeau; Trudeau Transformed

Monique Esther Nemni (Egyptian Arabic: مونيكوى نيمنى; March 27, 1936 – 2 November 2022) was an Egyptian-born Canadian linguist and writer, best known for a series of biographies of former Prime Minister of Canada Pierre Trudeau which she cowrote with her husband Max Nemni.

Nemni was a professor of linguistics at the Université du Québec à Montréal, and a coeditor of Cité Libre.

The first volume of the Trudeau biography, Young Trudeau: Son of Quebec, Father of Canada, 1919-1944, won the Shaughnessy Cohen Prize for Political Writing in 2006. The second volume, Trudeau Transformed: The Shaping of a Statesman, 1944-1965, was a shortlisted nominee for the same award in 2011. A third volume, focusing on Trudeau's career in elected politics after 1965, is slated for future publication.

Nemni died of a heart attack in Naples, on 2 November 2022, at the age of 86.

== Works ==
- Young Trudeau: Son of Quebec, Father of Canada, 1919-1944 (2006, ISBN 978-0771067495)
- Trudeau Transformed: The Shaping of a Statesman, 1944-1965 (2011, ISBN 978-0771051258)
