= Hugh Winsor =

Canadian journalist (1938–2026)

Hugh Fraser Townsend Winsor, CM (18 April 1938 – 14 March 2026) was a Canadian journalist, noted for his work with The Globe and Mail and CBC Television's The Journal. He received the Charles Lynch Award for journalism in 1998 and was a Member of the Order of Canada from 2005.

== Life and career ==
Winsor was born in Saint John, New Brunswick on 18 April 1938. He graduated from Queen's University in Kingston, Ontario; he was a student there in the late 1950s and early 1960s, but did not formally graduate until 1973, due to late completion of one missing course. He later received an honorary doctorate from Queen's. His work with The Globe and Mail began as a member of that paper's Editorial Board in the mid-1960s, and he covered national politics for many years, into the early 2000s. His column, "The Power Game", was published there from September 1997 to June 2005. Winsor was a director of the North-South Institute from its inception in 1976 until 1990.

Winsor died from a stroke on 14 March 2026, at the age of 87.
