= Cité Libre =

Canadian political journal

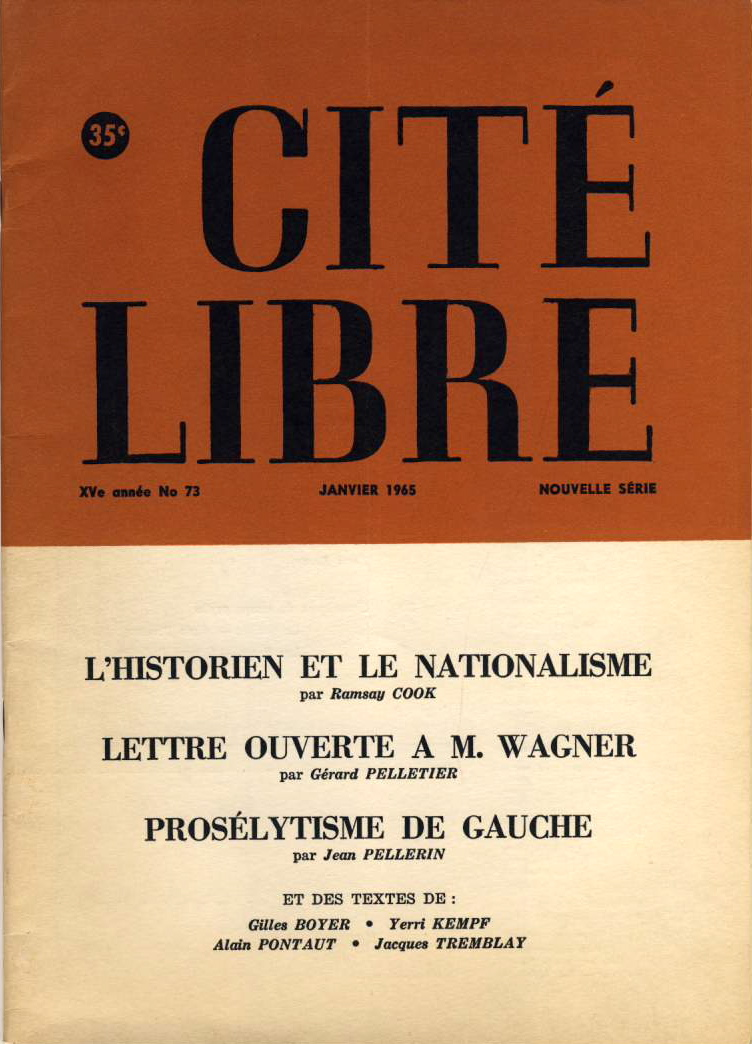
Cover of the January 1965 issue of Cité Libre

Cité Libre was an influential political journal published in Quebec, Canada, through the 1950s and 1960s. Co-founded in 1950 by editor and future Prime Minister of Canada Pierre Trudeau, the publication served as an organ of opposition to the conservative government of Maurice Duplessis.

The journal (whose title roughly translates into English as "Free Speech") published contributions by intellectuals such as Trudeau, Gérard Pelletier, René Lévesque, Pierre Vallières, Pierre Laporte, Jacques Hébert, Charles Gagnon and other intellectuals and activists. In doing so, the journal gained a reputation for its radical viewpoints at a time when anti-Duplessis views were difficult to get into print. The journal was anti-clerical and often criticized the strong influence that the Roman Catholic Church then had in Quebec. It also favoured civil liberties, as shown by its opposition to such measures as the Padlock Law (adopted by Duplessis in 1937) and its support of the Asbestos Strike. Editor Trudeau helped form the Rassemblement, a group devoted to turning the public against Duplessis. This group, combined with Cité Libre, helped foster the intellectualism that revived the Quebec Liberal Party, which defeated the Union Nationale in 1960. Many of the themes raised by Cité Libre found fruition during Quebec's Quiet Revolution of the 1960s. A number of the journal's contributors went on to take leading parts in that movement. As the 1960s progressed, Quebec society became divided between Quebec nationalists and sovereigntists such as Lévesque, Vallières and Gagnon and Canadian federalists such as Trudeau, Pelletier, Laporte and Hebert. This caused a rift among the journal's board members, ultimately leading to the magazine's evolution into a federalist journal as the sovereigntists left . As well, the journal abandoned its earlier interest in socialist ideas and became more and more liberal in orientation. The division among Quebec's left, as well as the entry of a number of Cité Libre figures into electoral politics, led to the journal's demise in 1966. Some of the journal's leading writers who would enter electoral politics included Trudeau and Pelletier successfully running for the Liberal Party in 1965 while Levesque and Laporte would become Cabinet Ministers for the Quebec Liberal Party with Levesque later leaving to found the Parti Quebecois in 1968. Hebert would be appointed to the Canadian Senate by Trudeau in 1983.

By 1965 Vallieres and Gagnon would break with Levesque over the latter's entering into electoral politics with Vallieres and Gagnon supporting the Front de libération du Québec (FLQ) an extreme nationalist terrorist group that would launch a campaign of bombings, bank robberies and kidnappings which would lead to the kidnapping and murder of Pierre Laporte in 1970. Vallieres had already been arrested on other charges and was not involved with the Laporte murder but he later renounced violence and wrote a defense claiming Laporte's murder was accidental which was refuted by the members of the FLQ who had already been convicted of the murder. Gagnon would also distance himself from the FLQ after 1970.

Cité Libre was revived in July 1991 to help promote Canadian national unity in Quebec and combat the perceived (pro-Quebec nationalist) "political unanimism" in the province. Anne-Marie Bourdouxhe, Gérard Pelletier's daughter, was its editor from 1991 to 1995, before she was replaced by academics Max Nemni and Monique Nemni. In 1998, an English-language version (also under the name Cité Libre) was launched; unlike most other bilingual publications, both the French and English versions were identical in their respective content.

Publication ceased (both in French and English) in 2000, officially because of the magazine's perception that separatism was defeated.
