= Terri Givens =

American political scientist

Terri E. Givens
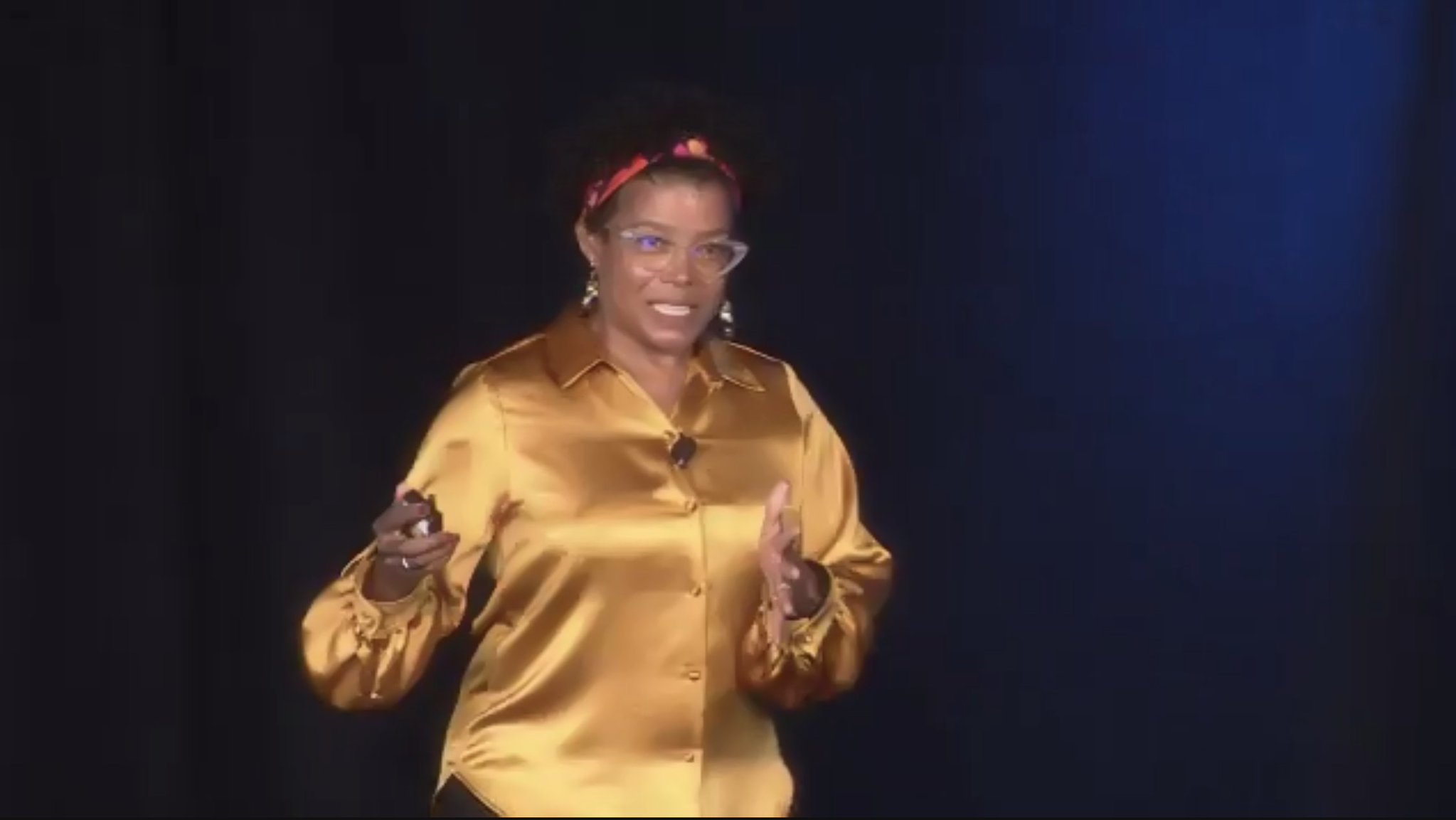
- Givens speaking
- Born: October 30, 1964 (age 61); Spokane, Washington, United States

Academic background
- Education: Stanford University (BA); University of California, Los Angeles (PhD)

Academic work
- Discipline: Political science
- Institutions: McGill University (until 2024) University of British Columbia (from 2024)

Terri E. Givens (born October 30, 1964) is an author and political scientist. Givens is a professor at the University of British Columbia.

== Education, research and service ==
Givens earned her MA and PhD in political science from the University of California, Los Angeles. She did her undergraduate studies in international relations at Stanford University. At Stanford she studied under former US Secretary of State Condoleezza Rice and was a member of Stanford's track and field team.

Givens was provost and a full professor at Menlo College where she focused on the success of first-generation students and helped update the curriculum, where she was the first African-American and woman to serve in the role. She was also vice provost and full professor at University of Texas at Austin. She began her teaching career at the University of Washington as an assistant professor.

Givens has also been active in charitable and non-profit leadership. She has been a member of the board of the Boys and Girls Club of the Peninsula, Fit Kids, and was the founder and CEO of the Center for Higher Education Leadership. She is also an alum and serves on the board of Gonzaga Preparatory School.

Givens' academic research has focused on immigration politics and antidiscrimination policy at the national level in Britain, France, Germany, Belgium, and the Netherlands, and policy developments at the European Union level.

At McGill University, Givens is leading an effort to hire and retain more Black professors.

As of July 2024, Givens works at the University of British Columbia as a professor of race, ethnicity and politics.

== Selected publications ==
- Givens, Terri (2005). Voting Radical Right in Western Europe. Cambridge University Press. ISBN 0521851343.
- Givens, Terri; Maxwell, Rahsaan (2012). Immigrant Politics: Race and Representation in Western Europe. Lynne Rienner Publishers. ISBN 978-1588268303.
- Givens, Terri (2021). Radical Empathy: Finding a Path to Bridging Racial Divides. Bristol University Press. ISBN 978-1447357254.
- Givens, Terri (2022). The Roots of Racism: The Politics of White Supremacy in the US and Europe. Policy Press. ISBN 978-1529209211.

== Awards and fellowships ==
- Fellow, Kolleg-Forschergruppe “Transformative Power of Europe,” Freie Universitaet, Berlin, Germany, 2010-2018
- Public Policy Scholar, Woodrow Wilson International Center for Scholars, Washington, D.C., 2012.
- Visiting Scholar, Centre d’Etudes et de Recherches Internationales, Sciences-Po, Paris, France, 2010.
- Distinguished Scholar Alumni from Stanford University, 2010.
- Gonzaga Preparatory School Hall of Fame, February 2025
