= The Lion, the Fox & the Eagle =

Book by Carol Off

The Lion, the Fox & the Eagle: A Story of Generals and Justice in Yugoslavia and Rwanda
- Author: Carol Off
- Language: English
- Genre: Non-fiction, Biography
- Publisher: Random House Canada
- Publication date: November 2000
- Publication place: United States
- Media type: Print (Hardcover & Paperback)
- Pages: 406
- ISBN: 978-0-679-31049-5
- OCLC: 59541047
- Dewey Decimal: 949.703 22
- LC Class: JZ6377.C2 O34 2000

The Lion, the Fox & the Eagle: A Story of Generals and Justice in Rwanda and Yugoslavia is a non-fiction book by Canadian journalist Carol Off. The hardcover edition was published in November 2000 by Random House Canada. The writing was favourably received and the book was short-listed for the Shaughnessy Cohen Award for Political Writing. With numerous interviews and extensive research behind it, the book presents biographies of three Canadians in United Nations roles in the 1990s: Roméo Dallaire (the "lion"), Lewis MacKenzie (the "fox"), and Louise Arbour (the "eagle").

The book praises Dallaire's commitment to his peacekeeping mission, but is critical of MacKenzie, who is depicted as being ignorant of the Bosnian political situation. In response to Off's portrayal of him, MacKenzie said he would consider suing for libel, but never did. The book praises Arbour's efforts at building the legitimacy of International Criminal Tribunals and her efforts in indicting alleged war criminals from the massacres in Rwanda and Bosnia. Through these biographies, the book addresses themes of morality and UN effectiveness.

== Background ==
Canadian Broadcasting Corporation journalist Carol Off began research to write a biography of Louise Arbour. Following input from fellow journalist and author Stevie Cameron, she broadened the book's scope to include profiles of Roméo Dallaire and Lewis MacKenzie. Along with her research assistant Sian Cansfield, they compiled twenty binders of research and conducted over a hundred interviews, including with the three subjects. For the historical background on Rwanda, she consulted the works of Gérard Prunier, Philip Gourevitch, Alison Des Forges, and the Human Rights Watch. For background on the conflicts in the former Yugoslavia, she consulted, amongst others, the works of Noel Malcolm, David Rieff, Roy Gutman. Living in Toronto with husband Linden MacIntyre, the 45-year-old author wrote the book in the spring and summer of 2000.

== Content ==
Roméo Dallaire, from October 1993 to August 1994, served as the Force Commander for the United Nations Assistance Mission for Rwanda. In January 1994 he passed along information to the UN from a Hutu informant about a planned extermination of Tutsi citizens and a massacre of Belgian peacekeepers. After the UN denied him permission to protect the informant, or seize any weapons, Dallaire made a plea to the Canadian government who also denied him any assistance. Dallaire continued his pleas to the UN after the genocide began and devised a plans to end the violence. The UN ordered the peacekeepers to withdraw and not interfere. Dallaire, believing the order unethical and unlawful, disobeyed and with 450 Ghanaian soldiers, protected Tutsi hideouts. He received help from non-governmental organizations, foreign journalists, and the Canadian government. With the media reporting on the massacre, the UN authorized 5,500 troops to protect civilians. Dallaire was denied permission to arrest fleeing Hutu leaders. In August Dallaire asked to be replaced after he recognized signs of posttraumatic stress disorder. Once back in Canada, he became appalled at how little the general public knew, and how much the world leaders knew, of what happened. In the aftermath, blame was assigned to various people, including Dallaire, but Off argues that blame lies with the UN and its Security Council who refused to act when called upon.

Lewis MacKenzie, in 1992, served in the Sarajevo division of United Nations Protection Force which was mandated to keep the peace in Croatia. Off describes MacKenzie as being indifferent as hostilities began in Sarajevo because his mandate did not include intervention in Bosnian affairs. MacKenzie's distrust of all participants in the hostilities grew following a botched prisoner exchange, the Breadline Massacre, and broken ceasefire arrangements. MacKenzie helped negotiate UN control of the Sarajevo International Airport which allowed humanitarian shipments. MacKenzie gave many media interviews but Off criticizes him for portraying both the Serbs and the Bosnians as aggressors and recommending against intervention.

Louise Arbour began her job as Chief Prosecutor of war crimes at the UN in October 1996. She was unexpectedly selected by her predecessor, Richard Goldstone, as he believed she processed the toughness to pursue war crime suspects and the bureaucratic and diplomatic skills to function at the UN. At the International Criminal Tribunal for the former Yugoslavia, contrary to Goldstone's tactic of publicizing indictments, which allowed the accused to make their arrest a risk to the ceasefire, Arbour kept hers sealed allowing for surprise arrests. In Rwanda she achieved several high-profile prosecutions, including the first conviction for rape as a war crime. By time she left in Fall 1999, her office had Slobodan Milošević, a head of state, indicted and arrested.

== Style ==
The book is divided into four sections: one for each biography and one to provide background context for the conflicts in Rwanda and Bosnia. There are also sections entitled Introduction, Conclusion, Acknowledgments, Source Notes, and Index. The three biographies of the Canadians focus on their involvement in international conflicts through the United Nations, but also includes aspects of their backgrounds and follow events after they leave the UN. In the profiles Off avoids describing places and events but provides a chapter to "a Grapes of Wrath-style description of her two locales". The biographies compare and contrast the strategy and effect of each person's approach to their mission. One reviewer compared the profiles of Dallaire and MacKenzie to Suetonius's biographies of Athenian generals Nicias and Alcibiades. Suetonius portrayed Nicias as honourable, moderate, and effective but overshadowed by the more vocal and polarizing Alcibiades. Likewise, Off portrayed Dallaire as the more honourable commander but over-shadowed by the more media savvy and callous MacKenzie. Off's focus on moral choices was called "a feminist approach" by several members of the Department of National Defence.

In the Introduction, Off explains the animal metaphors. Roméo Dallaire is the 'lion' because he acted courageously with an appearance of control and confidence. Lewis MacKenzie compared to a 'fox' because while he made a brave and dramatic defense of the airport, and was trusted by outside observers, his actions in recommending against intervention were based on the cunning logic that all sides were, at least, partly responsible for the conflict. Louise Arbour is portrayed as the 'eagle' for her pursuit of justice and her use of surprise SWAT-like arrests.

== Themes ==
On the one hand, Lewis MacKenzie argues that the security of the soldiers come first, the mission second... Then there's the Dallaire view: it's the mission first and the soldiers second.

— The Lion, the Fox & the Eagle, page 238.

Reviewers identified two themes: morality and the UN effectiveness. Off characterized Dallaire and Arbour as morally correct and MacKenzie morally wrong. In Rwanda, Dallaire lobbied the UN to intervene to stop the genocide. In Yugoslavia, MacKenzie is accused of being an apologist for the Serbs. In an interview Off admitted that she would prefer MacKenzie to be her son's commander but would want Dallaire if her people were being attacked because one puts his soldiers before the mission and the other the mission before the soldiers.

She identifies the UN as the book's villain and criticizes the UN's practise of moral equivalency that treats both sides equally even though one side is clearly dominant and brutally oppressive. It results in the requirement of its personnel to remain neutral but Off questions how a peacekeeper can remain neutral while watching people being killed. The book treats this as a reality of international relations, which places precedence on state sovereignty over human rights, and a factor in making the UN slow, ineffectual, and inappropriately bureaucratic. She notes that some peacekeepers cope by demonizing all sides which helps diminish the sense of impotence in being unable to intervene.

== Publication and Reception ==
Random House Canada published the hardcover in November 2000. An excerpt was published in the weekly general interest magazine Saturday Night. It appeared on Maclean's best-seller list for 4 weeks, peaking at #3. A Random House imprint, Vintage Canada, published the trade paperback a year later. The Writers' Trust of Canada short-listed the book for its 2000 Shaughnessy Cohen Award for Political Writing.

Reviewers described Off's writing as strong, clear, and sometimes elegant. Reviewing for the Quill & Quire, Derek Weiler wrote that the book's strength is its "informative outlines of [the] conflicts, with gripping and readable summary enhanced by evocative scene-setting." Weiler and other reviewers found the chapters on Arbour, where the narrative slackens, to be the weakest part of the book.

While Arbour was pleased with her profile, MacKenzie was not. Reviewers noted Off's critical portrayal of MacKenzie as being excessive and MacKenzie considered suing Off for libel. Instead MacKenzie wrote a response in The Globe and Mail presenting his point of view concerning the mission and events. In 2008 he wrote an autobiography with a chapter dedicated to addressing the criticism he received as a result of Off's book. While Off condemns MacKenzie for not learning the conflict's history and telling American audiences that both sides were to blame for the conflict, MacKenzie defends himself by stating it was international decision-making, not his opinions, that led the UN to not intervene.
