= Coeur d'Alene Mission of the Sacred Heart =

Historic church in Idaho, United States

- U.S. National Register of Historic Places
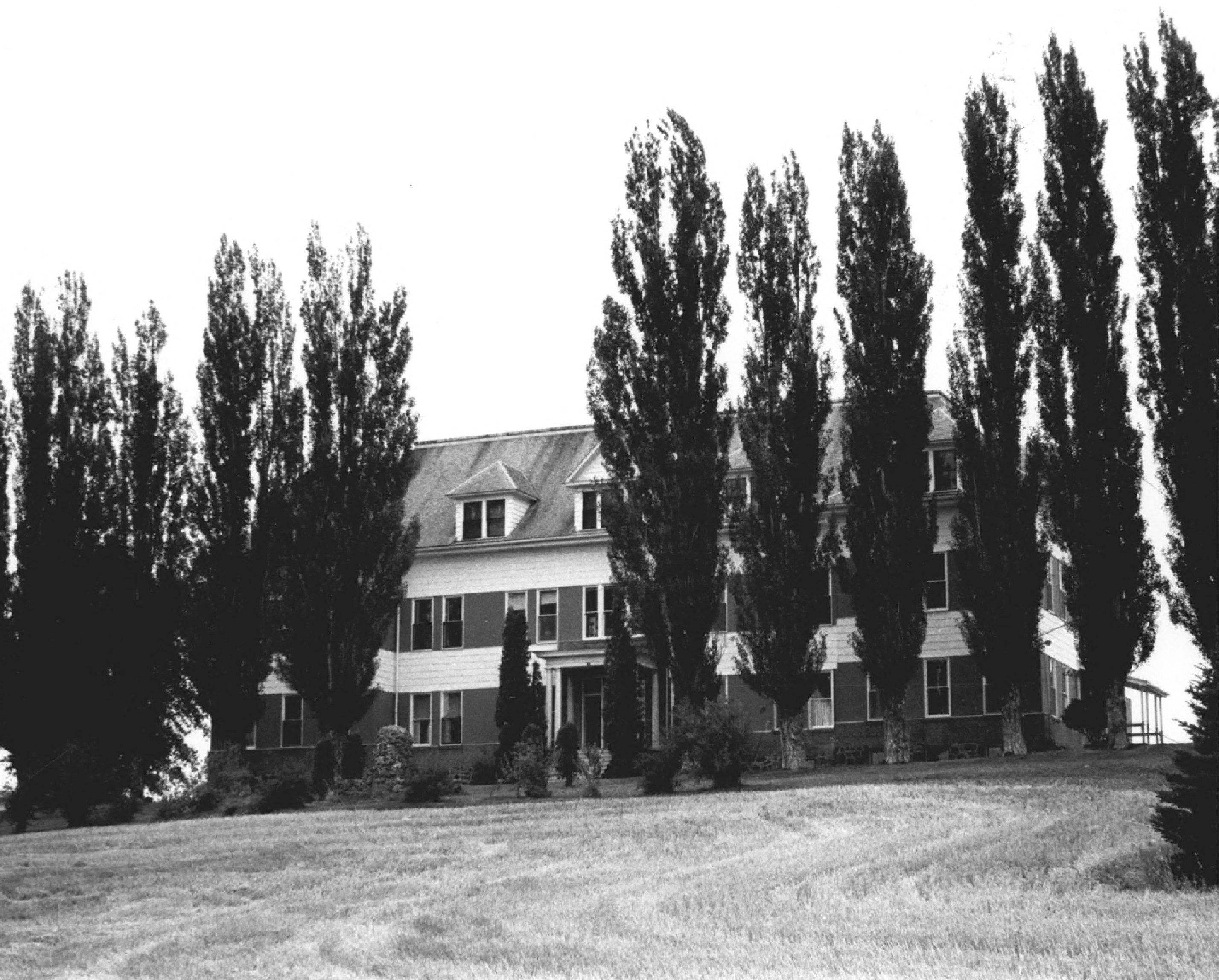
- The mission school in 1975

- Location within Idaho Location within the United States
- Location: Off U.S. 95; De Smet, Idaho
- Coordinates: 47°08′45″N 116°54′52″W
- Area: less than one acre
- NRHP reference No.: 75000623
- Added to NRHP: April 21, 1975

Coeur d'Alene Mission of the Sacred Heart is a historic church mission school off U.S. 95 in Desmet, Idaho.

The mission was added to the National Register of Historic Places in 1975.

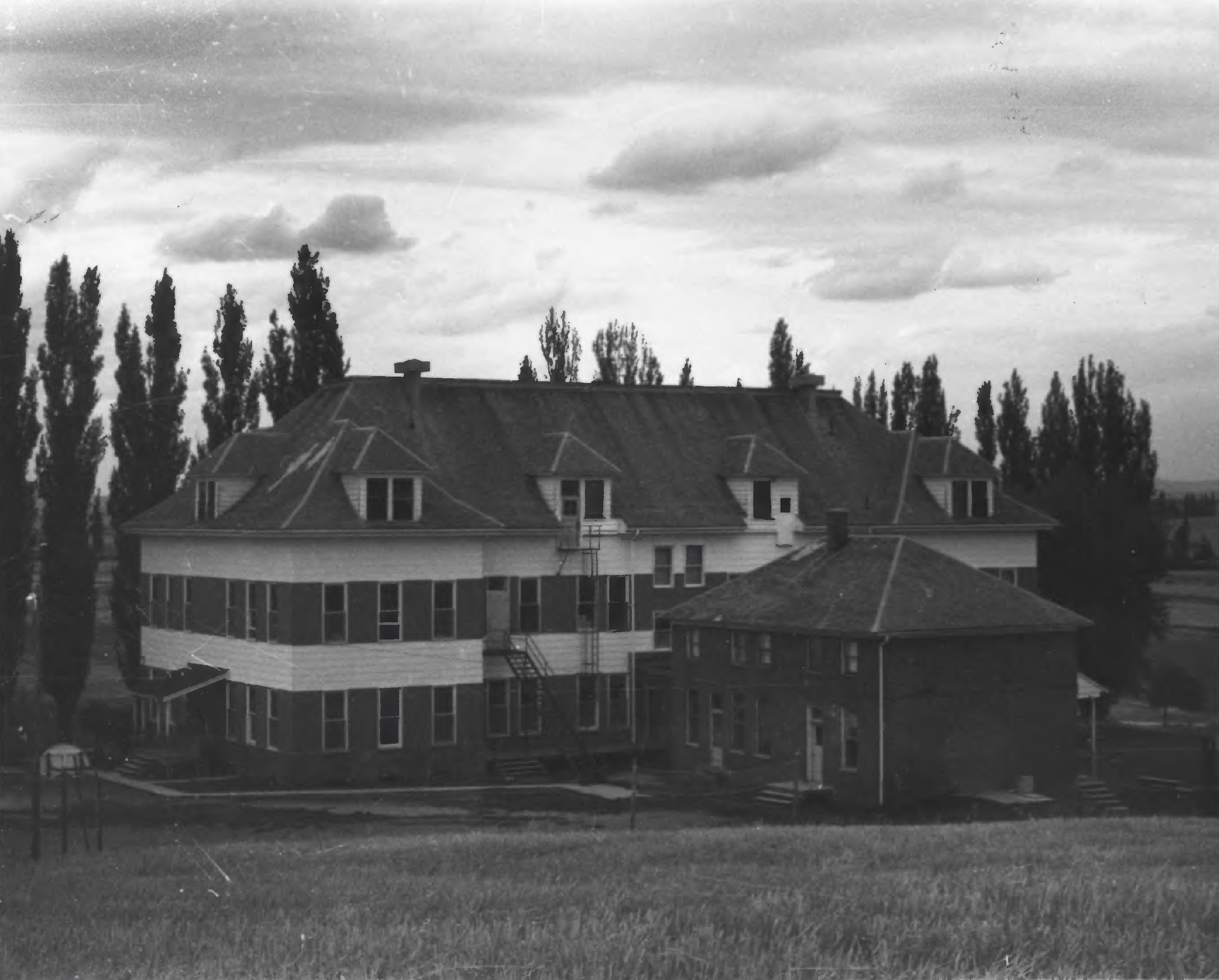
De Smet mission school

The mission was destroyed by fire in 2011.

The NRHP-listed building was a major schoolhouse which had been built in two phases. Its three-story front section was built after 1900. A smaller hip-roofed two-story brick structure, connected at the rear, was built after 1877.

At the time of NRHP listing, the first floor of another early structure survived in a two-story building, but was not deemed eligible for NRHP listing.

The original chapel of the mission was destroyed in a 1939 fire.
