= National Press Building (Ottawa) =

Building in Ottawa, Canada

Coordinates: 45.422093°N 75.700269°W

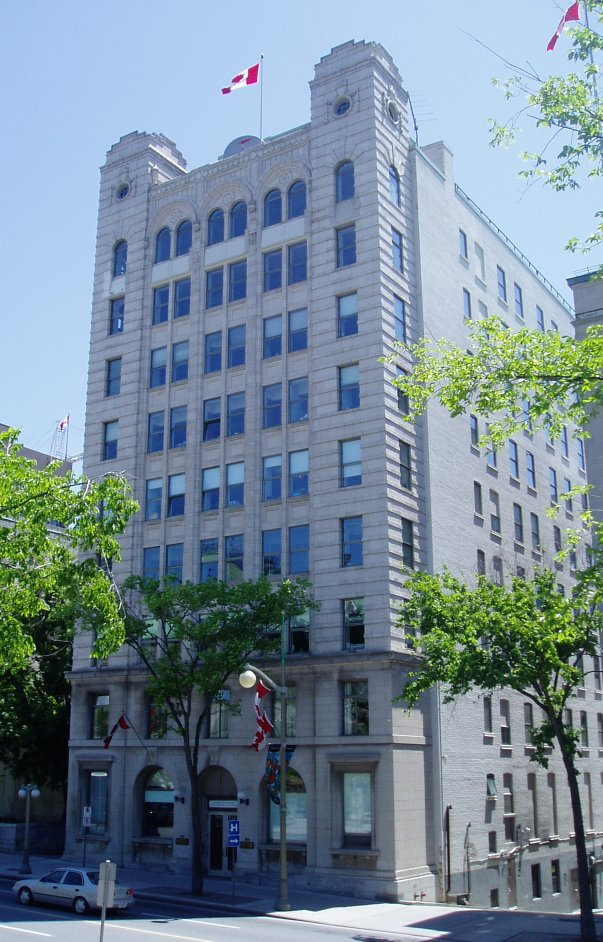
The National Press Building

The National Press Building in Ottawa, Canada, is a building on Wellington Street, just across from the West Block of the Parliament Buildings, that houses the Parliamentary Press Gallery. The building is owned by the federal government. Originally the press had their offices inside the Centre Block of the Parliament buildings. By the mid-1960s these areas had become overcrowded, and the large number of journalists based in desks lined against the walls of hallways were deemed a fire hazard. Thus the press were moved to their new home across the street. The Italian Renaissance building, originally named the Norlite Building, had been constructed in 1917–1919 and originally held several government agencies.

Offices in the building are provided to journalists at cost by the federal government, with some other facilities remaining in the Centre Block. The building is home to a wide array of news agencies, both national and foreign, and all forms of media. The building is often described as "dingy" and the offices are very small, and many larger organizations thus choose to base their reporters elsewhere. In 2004, the CBC moved its parliamentary bureau from the building to the new CBC Ottawa Broadcast Centre. The National Press Club is situated on the second floor.

From 2008 to 2010, the Global Television Network had the studio of its weeknight Global National newscast in a purpose-built green screen studio in the building. The only national newscast to be anchored in the nation's capital, the program was normally anchored by Kevin Newman, who presented to cameras remotely controlled by producers in the network's Vancouver control centre. The combination of digitally controlled cameras and the green screen gave the impression of a much larger studio space than is actually there.
