= Kim Smiley =

Canadian fashion designer

- Born: October 9, 1975 (age 50); Montreal, Canada
- Education: McGill University, Harvard University
- Occupations: Fashion Designer & Thought Leader
- Height: 5 ft 6 in (1.68 m)
- Children: 2
- Parents: Stanley Smiley (father); Nancy Smiley (mother)
- Website: kimsmiley.com

Kim Smiley (born October 9, 1975) is a Canadian fashion designer, artist, activist and writer.

== Early life ==
Kim Smiley was born in Montreal, Canada. Her parents are Stanley and Nancy Smiley (née Pomerantz). She is Jewish. Smiley has two older brothers, Tracy and Jamie. Her family travelled across the Middle East and Asia for a year when she was three years old. After living overseas and in the United States and Japan, Smiley moved to Toronto, Canada, where she currently resides.

== Education ==
Kim Smiley completed her undergraduate degree at McGill University in Montreal, Quebec. She specialized in comparative religion, cultural anthropology and art history. Smiley completed graduate school at Harvard University in Cambridge, Massachusetts. She specialized in Asian Religion, Compassion, Mysticism and Women's Studies. Smiley was awarded the John E. Thayer Award from Harvard University's Committee on General Scholarships, conferred to the student who graduates at the top of their class.

In 2001, Smiley conducted a post-graduate fellowship in Tokyo and Kyoto, Japan. She received The Frederick Sheldon Travelling Fellowship from Harvard to complete her research. Smiley's ethnography focused on the decline of the Geisha tradition, rise of the Western hostess industry, and changing beauty ideals in the modern world.

== Philanthropy ==
Smiley served as an Executive in the nonprofit sector, primarily in the social services, for a decade. Her work focused on poverty alleviation, mental health, women's empowerment, affordable housing and human rights. Smiley served at the Montreal Holocaust Memorial Centre and Museum, UJA Federation of Greater Toronto, and Habitat for Humanity Toronto.

At Habitat for Humanity, Smiley launched the Women Build in Toronto, an international program to construct affordable homes for women living in poverty. She engaged Canadian supermodel Monika Schnarre as an ambassador for the program.

== Fashion ==
Smiley launched her line in 2014 at World MasterCard Fashion Week, and was recognized as a "Rising Star" by The Kit. She debuted her collection with the Toronto Fashion Incubator (TFI), while working as a vice president in the charitable sector. Kim Smiley employs refugees who come to Canada, pays them a living wage, and teaches them necessary design skills.

In 2014, Canadian entrepreneur Heather Reisman wore Smiley's signature lace cuff in Maclean's magazine (The Power Issue); Indigo's Flagship store at Bay and Bloor in Toronto hosted Smiley to present her collection later that year.

In 2016, Sophie Grégoire Trudeau wore Kim Smiley at the Press Gallery Dinner in Ottawa. In 2018, Smiley was catapulted onto the international stage when Sophie and Canadian Prime Minister Justin Trudeau wore her designs on an official trip to India. Smiley was selected by Fashion Heals to create a capsule collection to benefit SickKids Hospital in Toronto in 2018.

On November 5, 2020, Smiley opened her eponymous Global Flagship at 1070 Eglinton Avenue West in Toronto, Ontario. Two weeks later the COVID-19 lockdown forced her to close her doors, causing Smiley to pivot her operation.

== Empathy Effect ==
Smiley has written for the Huffington Post, Chronicles of Jewish Philanthropy and the Canadian Jewish News.

In 2015, Smiley launched a social experiment called The Empathy Effect. She harnessed her background in photojournalism and writing for a 365-day experiment to test whether empathy was infectious. Over the course of one year, she posted a story and image on Facebook about individuals who had changed the world using empathy. The experiment concluded on June 8, 2016, when Smiley launched an initiative called the Empathy Pledge (#empathypledge) to raise funds and awareness.

The Empathy Effect was formed into a national non-profit organization in 2017.
