= Susan Delacourt =

Canadian journalist

- Education: University of Western Ontario
- Occupation: Political journalist
- Employer: Toronto Star
- Notable work: United We Fall (1993) Shaughnessy (2000) Juggernaut (2003) Shopping for Votes (2013)
- Awards: Canadian Journalism Fellowship (2008) Charles Lynch Award for reporting with the Canadian Parliamentary Press Gallery (2011) Hyman Solomon Award for Excellence in Public Policy Journalism (2014)
- Website: https://www.thestar.com/authors.delacourt_susan.html

Susan Delacourt is a Canadian political journalist.

She spent her childhood and adolescence in Milton, Ontario. She first developed her skills as a journalist while at the University of Western Ontario, where she was an editor of the UWO Gazette, the student newspaper.

In 2011, Delacourt was selected by her peers as the recipient of the Charles Lynch Award, for lifetime achievement in political writing. In 2012, Delacourt was named by Canadian political newspaper Hill Times as one of "The Top 100 Most Influential People in Government and Politics". In 2007, she was among the first inductees into Milton's Walk of Fame for the town's 150th anniversary to honor her achievements.

Delacourt is a senior writer at the Toronto Star. Previously, she was the senior political writer at the National Post, a columnist and feature writer at the Ottawa Citizen and, for sixteen years, a parliamentary correspondent and editorial board member of The Globe and Mail. She is a graduate the University of Western Ontario (1982, majoring in Political Science). She is also a Masters student in the School of Political Studies at Carleton University, studying "consumerism and material culture, and their intersection with citizenship/democracy/politics".

Delacourt is the author of four books on Canadian politics: United We Fall: The Crisis of Democracy in Canada (1993), an account of the failure of the Charlottetown Accord, Shaughnessy: The Passionate Politics of Shaughnessy Cohen (2000), concerning the late Member of Parliament, Juggernaut: Paul Martin's Campaign for Chretien's Crown (2003), and Shopping for Votes: How Politicians Choose Us and We Choose Them (2013). Shopping for Votes was a shortlisted nominee for the 2014 Hilary Weston Writers' Trust Prize for Nonfiction.
