= Carol Off =

Canadian journalist and broadcaster

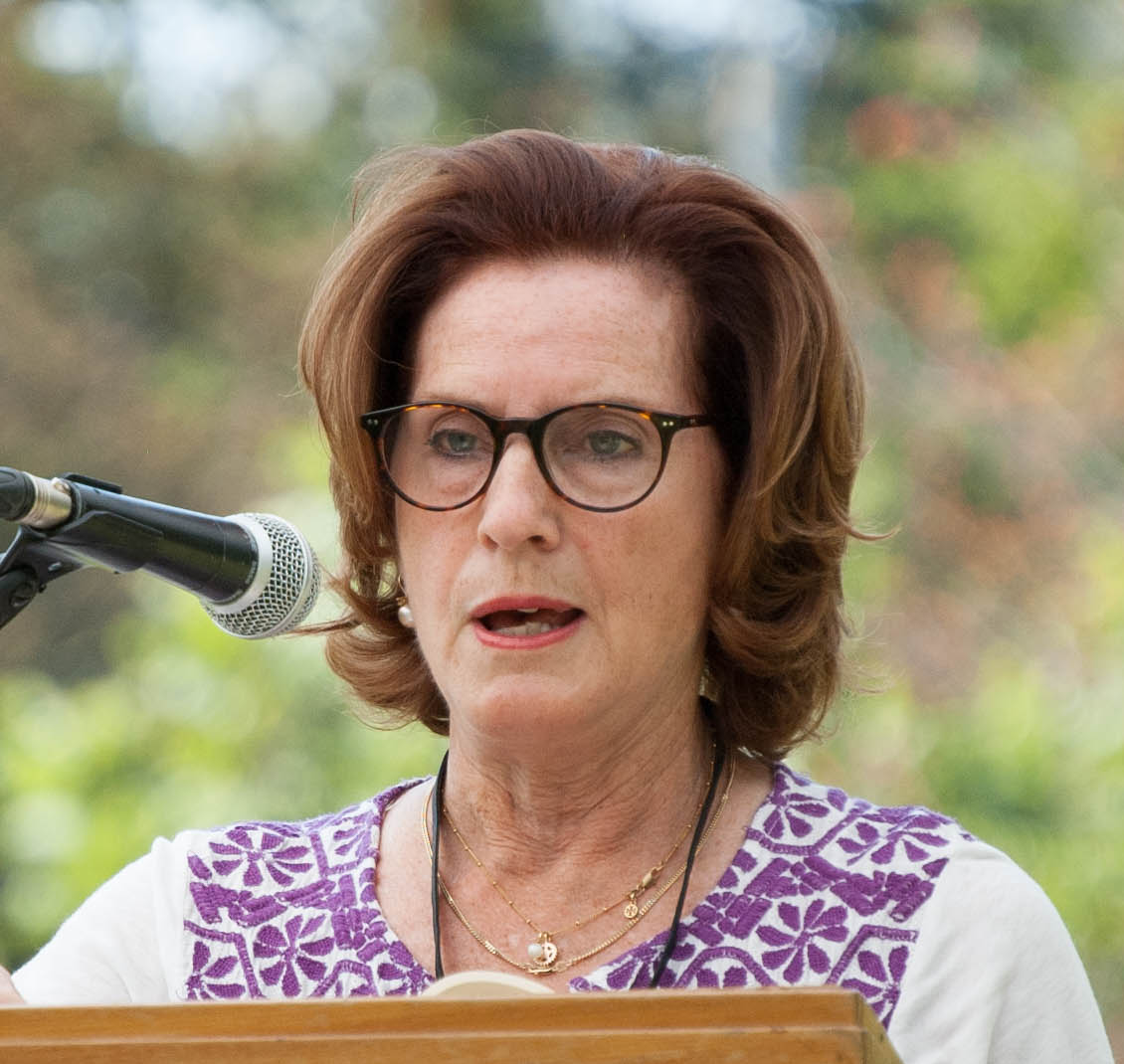
- Off at the Eden Mills Writers' Festival in 2017
- Born: 1954 or 1955 (age 71–72); Winnipeg, Manitoba, Canada
- Education: University of Western Ontario
- Spouse(s): Fred Harrison (m. c. 1975-1981); Linden MacIntyre (m. 2000)
- Children: 1
- Presenting career
- Show: As It Happens
- Network: CBC Radio One

Carol Off (born 1954/1955) is a Canadian journalist, commentator, and author formerly associated with CBC Television and CBC Radio.

== Early life ==
Off was born in Winnipeg, Manitoba, in 1954 or 1955. She moved to Ottawa at ten years old and later moved to London, Ontario. She dropped out of high school to go traveling and hitchhiked around Canada for 2 years. After returning, she finished high school and married Fred Harrison.

She attended the University of Western Ontario and studied English, which began her career.

== Career ==
Off got her start in journalism as a staff writer for The Gazette, the student newspaper at the University of Western Ontario. She graduated with a B.A. degree from Western in 1981.

Off was a host of CBC Radio One's As It Happens from 2006 to 2022. Previously a documentary reporter for The National, where she covered international affairs, Off also hosted the political debate series CounterSpin on CBC Newsworld.

She is co-president of the Canadian Journalists for Free Expression.

Off has been honoured for her journalism with a Gemini Award (2002), the John Drainie Award (2008), and a Gabriel Award (2016).

Off has also written books on the Canadian Armed Forces, including The Lion, the Fox & the Eagle: A Story of Generals and Justice in Rwanda and Yugoslavia (2000) and The Ghosts of Medak Pocket: the Story of Canada's Secret War (2005).

In 2006, she released Bitter Chocolate, a book about the corruption and human rights abuses associated with the cocoa industry. She wrote that French-Canadian journalist Guy-André Kieffer, who was kidnapped in Abidjan, Côte d'Ivoire, in 2004, had been murdered for exposing Ivorian government corruption in connection with cocoa.

Her book All We Leave Behind: A Reporter's Journey into the Lives of Others (2017) won the 2018 British Columbia's National Award for Canadian Non-Fiction and the 2018 Ontario Historical Society Huguenot Society of Canada Award.

Off has received honorary degrees from both the University of Western Ontario and the Royal Military College of Canada.

On January 18, 2022, Off announced her retirement from As It Happens on-air, effective February 25.

In 2024, Off wrote a book, At a Loss for Words: Conversation in an Age of Rage, about contemporary political rhetoric and how certain political terms such as "democracy," "freedom", and "truth" have become distorted in political conversation.

In 2026, she released True Patriot Love: Reporting from the Frontlines of Canadian Sovereignty.

== Personal life ==
Off married painter Fred Harrison after she graduated from high school, and her only child, a son named Joel Harrison, was born in 1976. She divorced Harrison and left their son with him when she moved to Toronto after graduating from the University of Western Ontario. Later, Off married fellow CBC broadcaster Linden MacIntyre in 2000.
