= Hilary Weston Writers' Trust Prize for Nonfiction =

Annual Canadian literary prize

- Type: Literary
- Awarded for: Canadian nonfiction
- Sponsored by: Hilary Weston; Viacom (former); Pearson Canada (former); Nereus Financial (former)
- Country: Canada
- Rewards: CA$60,000 (winner); CA$5,000 (finalists)
- Currently held by: Martha Baillie for There Is No Blue
- Website: https://www.writerstrust.com/awards/hilary-weston-writers-trust-prize-for-nonfiction

The Hilary Weston Writers' Trust Prize for Nonfiction is a Canadian literary award, presented annually by the Writers' Trust of Canada to the best work of non-fiction by a Canadian writer.

== Sponsorship history ==
First established in 1997, the award's original corporate sponsor was Viacom. Pearson Canada, the regional branch of an educational book publishing company, took over the award in 1999, and Nereus Financial, a stock brokerage, became the sponsor from 2006 to 2008. After Nereus dropped its sponsorship, the award had no corporate sponsor until 2011, when Hilary Weston (a philanthropist and former Lieutenant Governor of Ontario) was announced as the award's new sponsor.

Canada's most lucrative non-fiction prize, the winner receives a cash sum of CA$60,000 and all finalists receive CA$5,000. Prior to Weston's patronage of the award, the prize would consist CA$15,000 for the winner and CA$2,000 for the finalists.

== Nominees and winners ==
Hilary Weston Writers' Trust Prize for Nonfiction winners and finalists
Year	Author	Title	Result	Ref.
1997	Ernest Hillen	Small Mercies: A Boy After War	Winner	
1997	Charlotte Gray	Mrs. King: The Life and Times of Isabel Mackenzie King	Finalist	
1997	John Bentley Mays	Power in the Blood: Land, Memory, and a Southern Family	Finalist	
1997	Ruth Teichroeb	Flowers on My Grave	Finalist	
1997	Eileen Whitfield	Pickford: The Woman Who Made Hollywood	Finalist	
1998	Rudy Wiebe and Yvonne Johnson	Stolen Life: The Journey of a Cree Woman	Winner	
1998	Michael Ignatieff	Isaiah Berlin: A Life	Finalist	
1998	David Manicom	Progeny of Ghosts: Travels in Russia and the Old Empire	Finalist	
1998	Linda Spalding	The Follow	Finalist	
1998	Charles Wilkins	The Circus at the Edge of the Earth	Finalist	
1999	Modris Eksteins	Walking Since Daybreak: A Story of Eastern Europe, World War II and the Heart of our Century	Winner	
1999	Robert Bringhurst	Story as Sharp as a Knife: The Classical Haida Mythtellers and Their World	Finalist	
1999	Jacalyn Duffin	History of Medicine: A Scandalously Short Introduction	Finalist	
1999	Moira Farr	After Daniel: A Suicide Survivor's Tale	Finalist	
1999	Wayne Johnston	Baltimore's Mansion: A Memoir	Finalist	
2000	Erna Paris	Long Shadows: Truth, Lies and History	Winner	
2000	Donald Harman Akenson	Saint Saul: A Skeleton Key to the Historical Jesus	Finalist	
2000	Hugh Brody	The Other Side of Eden: Hunters, Farmers and the Shaping of the World	Finalist	
2000	Taras Grescoe	Sacré Blues: An Unsentimental Journey Through Quebec	Finalist	
2000	John Stackhouse	Out of Poverty: And into Something More Comfortable	Finalist	
2001	Clark Blaise	Time Lord	Winner	
2001	Kevin Major	As Near to Heaven by Sea	Finalist	
2001	Heather Pringle	The Mummy Congress	Finalist	
2001	Carol Shields	Jane Austen	Finalist	
2001	Jack Todd	The Taste of Metal: A Deserter’s Story	Finalist	
2002	Jake MacDonald	Houseboat Chronicles: Notes from a Life in Shield Country	Winner	
2002	Katherine Ashenburg	The Mourner’s Dance: What We Do When People Die	Finalist	
2002	Andrew Clark	Keen Soldier: The Execution of Second World War Private Harold Pringle	Finalist	
2002	Marni Jackson	Pain: The Fifth Vital Sign	Finalist	
2002	Lorie Miseck	Promise of Salt	Finalist	
2003	Brian Fawcett	Virtual Clearcut, or The Way Things Are in My Hometown	Winner	
2003	Mark Abley	Spoken Here: Travels Among Threatened Languages	Finalist	
2003	J. Edward Chamberlin	If This Is Your Land, Where Are Your Stories? Finding Common Ground	Finalist	
2003	Marq de Villiers and Sheila Hirtle	Sahara: A Natural History	Finalist	
2003	Taras Grescoe	The End of Elsewhere: Travels Among the Tourists	Finalist	
2004	Elaine Dewar	The Second Tree: Of Clones, Chimeras, and Quests for Immortality	Winner	
2004	Shaughnessy Bishop-Stall	Down to This: Squalor and Splendour in a Big-City Shantytown	Finalist	
2004	Trevor Herriot	Jacob's Wound: A Search for the Spirit of Wildness	Finalist	
2004	Patrick Lane	There is a Season: A Memoir in a Garden	Finalist	
2004	Charles Montgomery	The Last Heathen: Encounters With Ghosts and Ancestors in Melanesia	Finalist	
2005	John Vaillant	The Golden Spruce: A True Story of Myth, Madness and Greed	Winner	
2005	Rebecca Godfrey	Under the Bridge: The True Story of the Murder of Reena Virk	Finalist	
2005	Stephen Lewis	Race Against Time: Searching for Hope in AIDS-Ravaged Africa	Finalist	
2005	J.B. MacKinnon	Dead Man in Paradise	Finalist	
2006	Dragan Todorovic	The Book of Revenge	Winner	
2006	Charlotte Gray	Reluctant Genius: The Passionate Life and Inventive Mind of Alexander Graham Bell	Finalist	
2006	Barbara Kingscote	Ride the Rising Wind: One Woman's Journey Across Canada	Finalist	
2006	Noah Richler	This is My Country, What's Yours? A Literary Atlas of Canada	Finalist	
2006	Rudy Wiebe	Of This Earth: A Mennonite Boyhood in the Boreal Forest	Finalist	
2007	Anna Porter	Kasztner's Train: The True Story of Rezso Kasztner, Unknown Hero of the Holocaust	Winner	
2007	Katherine Ashenburg	The Dirt on Clean: An Unsanitized History	Finalist	
2007	Tim Bowling	The Lost Coast: Salmon, Memory and the Death of Wild Culture	Finalist	
2007	Barry Gough	Fortune's a River: The Collision of Empires in Northwest America	Finalist	
2007	Douglas Hunter	God's Mercies: Rivalry, Betrayal and the Dream of Discovery	Finalist	
2008	Taras Grescoe	Bottomfeeder: How to Eat Ethically in a World of Vanishing Seafood	Winner	
2008	Carl Honoré	Under Pressure: Rescuing Childhood from the Culture of Hyper-Parenting	Finalist	
2008	Mark Kingwell	Concrete Reveries: Consciousness and the City	Finalist	
2008	Margaret Visser	The Gift of Thanks: The Roots, Persistence and Paradoxical Meanings of a Social Ritual	Finalist	
2008	Russell Wangersky	Burning Down the House: Fighting Fires and Losing Myself	Finalist	
2009	Brian Brett	Trauma Farm: A Rebel History of Rural Life	Winner	
2009	Wade Davis	The Wayfinders: Why Ancient Wisdom Matters in the Modern World	Finalist	
2009	Trevor Herriot	Grass, Sky, Song: Promise and Peril in the World of Grassland Birds	Finalist	
2009	Erika Ritter	The Dog by the Cradle, the Serpent Beneath: Some Paradoxes of Human-Animal Relationships	Finalist	
2009	Eric Siblin	The Cello Suites: J.S. Bach, Pablo Casals, and the Search for a Baroque Masterpiece	Finalist	
2010	James FitzGerald	What Disturbs Our Blood: A Son's Quest to Redeem the Past	Winner	
2010	Ross King	Defiant Spirits: The Modernist Revolution of the Group of Seven	Finalist	
2010	Sarah Leavitt	Tangles: A Story About Alzheimer's, My Mother and Me	Finalist	
2010	John Theberge and Mary Theberge	The Ptarmigan's Dilemma: An Exploration into How Life Organizes and Supports Itself	Finalist	
2010	Merrily Weisbord	The Love Queen of Malabar: Memoir of a Friendship with Kamala Das	Finalist	
2011	Charles Foran	Mordecai: The Life & Times	Winner	
2011	Charlotte Gill	Eating Dirt: Deep Forests, Big Timber, and Life with the Tree-Planting Tribe	Finalist	
2011	Richard Gwyn	Nation Maker: Sir John A. Macdonald: His Life, Our Times; Volume Two: 1867-1891	Finalist	
2011	Grant Lawrence	Adventures in Solitude: What Not to Wear to a Nudist Potluck and Other Stories from Desolation Sound	Finalist	
2011	Ray Robertson	Why Not? Fifteen Reasons to Live	Finalist	
2012	Candace Savage	A Geography of Blood: Unearthing Memory from a Prairie Landscape	Winner	
2012	Kamal Al-Solaylee	Intolerable: A Memoir of Extremes	Finalist	
2012	Modris Eksteins	Solar Dance: Genius, Forgery, and the Crisis of Truth in the Modern Age	Finalist	
2012	Taras Grescoe	Straphanger: Saving Our Cities and Ourselves from the Automobile	Finalist	
2012	JJ Lee	The Measure of a Man: The Story of a Father, a Son, and a Suit	Finalist	
2013	Graeme Smith	The Dogs Are Eating Them Now: Our War in Afghanistan	Winner	
2013	Thomas King	The Inconvenient Indian: A Curious Account of Native People in North America	Finalist	
2013	J.B. MacKinnon	The Once and Future World: Nature As It Was, As It Is, As It Could Be	Finalist	
2013	Andrew Steinmetz	This Great Escape: The Case of Michael Paryla	Finalist	
2013	Priscila Uppal	Projection: Encounters with My Runaway Mother	Finalist	
2014	Naomi Klein	This Changes Everything: Capitalism vs. the Climate	Winner	
2014	Susan Delacourt	Shopping for Votes: How Politicians Choose Us and We Choose Them	Finalist	
2014	Charles Montgomery	Happy City: Transforming Our Lives Through Urban Design	Finalist	
2014	Paula Todd	Extreme Mean: Trolls, Bullies, and Predators Online	Finalist	
2014	Kathleen Winter	Boundless: Tracing Land and Dream in a New Northwest Passage	Finalist	
2015	Rosemary Sullivan	Stalin's Daughter: The Extraordinary and Tumultuous Life of Svetlana Alliluyeva	Winner	
2015	Eliott Behar	Tell it to the World: International Justice and the Secret Campaign to Hide Mass Murder in Kosovo	Finalist	
2015	Douglas Coupland	Kitten Clone: Inside Alcatel-Lucent	Finalist	
2015	Dean Jobb	Empire of Deception: From Chicago to Nova Scotia – The Incredible Story of a Master Swindler Who Seduced a City and Captivated the Nation	Finalist	
2015	Lynette Loeppky	Cease: A Memoir of Love, Loss and Desire	Finalist	
2016	Deborah Campbell	Disappearance in Damascus: A Story of Friendship and Survival in the Shadow of War	Winner	
2016	Ian Brown	Sixty: A Diary of My Sixty-First Year: The Beginning of the End or the End of the Beginning?	Finalist	
2016	Matti Friedman	Pumpkinflowers: An Israeli Soldier's Story	Finalist	
2016	Ross King	Mad Enchantment: Claude Monet and the Painting of the Water Lilies	Finalist	
2016	Sonja Larsen	Red Star Tattoo: My Life as a Girl Revolutionary	Finalist	
2017	James Maskalyk	Life on the Ground Floor: Letters from the Edge of Emergency Medicine	Winner	
2017	Ivan Coyote	Tomboy Survival Guide	Finalist	
2017	Kyo Maclear	Birds Art Life: A Field Guide to the Small and Significant	Finalist	
2017	Carol Off	All We Leave Behind: A Reporter's Journey into the Lives of Others	Finalist	
2017	Tanya Talaga	Seven Fallen Feathers: Racism, Death, and Hard Truths in a Northern City	Finalist	
2018	Elizabeth Hay	All Things Consoled: A Daughter's Memoir	Winner	
2018	Will Aitken	Antigone Undone: Juliette Binoche, Anne Carson, Ivo Van Hove, and the Art of Resistance	Finalist	
2018	Terese Marie Mailhot	Heart Berries	Finalist	
2018	Judi Rever	In Praise of Blood: The Crimes of the Rwandan Patriotic Front	Finalist	
2018	Lindsay Wong	The Woo-Woo: How I Survived Ice Hockey, Drug Raids, Demons, and My Crazy Chinese Family	Finalist	
2019	Jenny Heijun Wills	Older Sister. Not Necessarily Related	Winner	
2019	Alicia Elliott	Mind Spread Out on the Ground	Finalist	
2019	Anna Mehler Paperny	Hello I Want to Die Please Fix Me: Depression in the First Person	Finalist	
2019	Tanya Talaga	All Our Relations: Finding the Path Forward	Finalist	
2019	Ayelet Tsabari	The Art of Leaving	Finalist	
2020	Jessica J. Lee	Two Trees Make a Forest: Travels Among Taiwan's Mountains and Coasts in Search of My Family's Past	Winner	
2020	Lorna Crozier	Through the Garden: A Love Story (with Cats)	Finalist	
2020	Steven Heighton	Reaching Mithymna: Among the Volunteers and Refugees on Lesvos	Finalist	
2020	Tessa McWatt	Shame on Me: An Anatomy of Race and Belonging	Finalist	
2020	David Neel	The Way Home	Finalist	
2021	Tomson Highway	Permanent Astonishment	Winner	
2021	Jordan Abel	Nishga	Finalist	
2021	Ken Haigh	On Foot to Canterbury	Finalist	
2021	Darrel J. McLeod	Peyakow	Finalist	
2021	Ian Williams	Disorientation	Finalist	
2022	Dan Werb	The Invisible Siege: The Rise of Coronaviruses and the Search for a Cure	Winner	
2022	Geoff Dembicki	The Petroleum Papers: Inside the Far-Right Conspiracy to Cover Up Climate Change	Finalist	
2022	Tara McGowan-Ross	Nothing Will Be Different: A Memoir	Finalist	
2022	Debra Thompson	The Long Road Home: On Blackness and Belonging	Finalist	
2022	Joshua Whitehead	Making Love with the Land	Finalist	
2023	Christina Sharpe	Ordinary Notes	Winner	
2023	Jamal Saeed	My Road from Damascus	Finalist	
2023	Angela Sterritt	Unbroken: My Fight for Survival, Hope, and Justice for Indigenous Women and Girls	Finalist	
2023	Emily Urquhart	Ordinary Wonder Tales	Finalist	
2023	John Vaillant	Fire Weather: A True Story from a Hotter World	Finalist	
2024	Martha Baillie	There Is No Blue	Winner	
2024	Chase Joynt	Vantage Points: On Media as Trans Memoir	Finalist	
2024	Amy Lin	Here After	Finalist	
2024	Lisa Moore, Jack Whalen	Invisible Prisons: Jack Whalen’s Tireless Fight for Justice	Finalist	
2024	Jenny Heijun Wills	Everything and Nothing At All	Finalist	
2025	Leanne Betasamosake Simpson	Theory of Water	Winner	
2025	Omar El Akkad	One Day, Everyone Will Have Always Been Against This	Shortlist	
2025	Tessa McWatt	The Snag	Shortlist	
2025	Vinh Nguyen	The Migrant Rain Falls in Reverse	Shortlist	
2025	Miriam Toews	A Truce That is Not Peace	Shortlist	
2026	Robert Moor	In Trees	Winner	
2026	Richard Kelly Kemick	Decadence	Shortlist	
2026	Trina Moyles	Black Bear: A Story of Siblinghood and Survival	Shortlist	
2026	Julian Brave NoiseCat	We Survived the Night	Shortlist	
2026	Dan Werb	Our Wild Familiars	Shortlist	

== Weston International Award ==
In 2023, the Writers' Trust introduced the Weston International Award, a prize which honours international non-fiction writers. Unlike the Canadian award, the international award does not release a list of finalists in advance of the winner announcement, and honours the writer for their overall body of work rather than an individual book.

- 2023 – Robert Macfarlane
- 2024 – Pankaj Mishra
- 2025 – Leslie Jamison
- 2026 – Hanif Abdurraqib
