= Otto Wacker =

German art dealer

Otto Wacker (1898–1970) was a German art dealer who became infamous for commissioning and selling forgeries of paintings by Vincent van Gogh. He had gained a good reputation in the 1920s after false starts in various other professions. Since the end of World War II, he lived in East Berlin. A study of his life and times has been written by Modris Eksteins.

== Forgeries and trial ==
Otto Wacker became an art dealer in 1925. He developed a reputation for reliability in the art field. The fraudulent Van Goghs were probably the work of his brother, the painter and restorer Leonhard Wacker. Otto's father, Hans, was also an artist.

Wacker managed to convince prominent Van Gogh experts Jacob Baart de la Faille, Hendrik P. Bremmer, Julius Meier-Graefe and Hans Rosenhagen that the paintings he was selling were genuine and they supplied certificates of authenticity without proof of provenance. These experts accepted his account that a Russian had bought the paintings, transferred them to Switzerland illegally, and had commissioned an illegal agent to sell them. They understood the need for this Russian to remain anonymous in order to prevent reprisals from relatives who still lived in the Soviet Union. Thannhauser, Matthiesen and Goldschmidt galleries bought some of the paintings.

Wacker's paintings were to be exhibited in January 1928 by the firm of Paul Cassirer in Berlin. It was organized to coincide with the publication of de la Faille's standard catalogue of Van Gogh's work. When Wacker delivered the last four paintings, Grete Ring and Walter Feilchenfeldt, the general managers of the exhibition, noticed the differences and recognized them as fakes. The canvases were returned to Wacker. Further investigation revealed 33 suspect paintings, all of them supplied by Wacker. Galleries that had sold his paintings asked their customers to return them. Hugo Perls, an art dealer and lawyer who had bought several paintings, still insisted that they were authentic. In December 1928 the Matthiesen gallery, with the aid of the Federation of German Art and Antique Dealers, sued Wacker.

De la Faille responded to the accusations by publishing a supplement to his catalogue in November 1928, which listed all the paintings supplied by Wacker as fakes. In 1930 de la Faille published Les faux van Goghs (The False Van Goghs) which again listed the suspect paintings among 174 that he regarded as forgeries. In May 1929 the studios of Wacker's father and brother were raided by police, who seized nine paintings from Hans and twelve from Leonhard. The latter claimed that the paintings were only in his studio for restoration. The National Gallery in Berlin analysed the paints used in the seized artworks; they discovered the presence of a resin used to accelerate the drying process, which had not been found in any genuine van Goghs.

The trial against Wacker began on 6 April 1932. Vincent Willem van Gogh, nephew of the painter, gave the first evidence at the trial and stated that family records did not include any Russian who would have purchased any paintings. De la Faille, on the other hand, had changed his mind once again and claimed that five of the paintings were genuine. During the trial, various experts did not come to full agreement on what paintings were authentic (and the argument was to continue in some circles for years afterwards). Bremmer argued that at least 9 paintings were genuine. Meier-Graefe admitted his mistake and even that the expert opinion could be fallible. Hans Rosenhagen said that 14 of the works were inferior but genuine. However, the Dutch restorer A M de Wild found that the pigments used in the paintings were not similar to those Van Gogh had used. Art restorer Kurt Wehlte showed with X-rays that the painting techniques were different (although he used a painting that was declared a forgery in the 1970s). Later it was found that the paintings had not been painted on French canvases at all. On 19 April 1932 Wacker was charged with fraud, and after an appeal, was sentenced to 19 months in prison and a fine of 30,000 ℛ︁ℳ︁. Some former directors of the Bank für Deutsche Beamte, who had been speculating on the paintings on behalf of the bank, were sued. A few of the incriminated paintings have disappeared since the close of the affair.

== Bibliography ==
- Modris Eksteins, Solar Dance. Genius, Forgery, and the Crisis of Truth in the Modern Age, Harvard University Press, Cambridge MA, 2012.
- Van Gogh: Mythos und Wirklichkeit , Stefan Koldehoff, DuMont Buchverlag, Cologne, 2003
- "Authentication in Art Unmasked Forgers".
