= The Varsity (newspaper) =

Student newspaper of the University of Toronto

- Front page of The Varsity Vol. CXLV, No. 7
- Type: Weekly student newspaper
- Format: Compact
- School: University of Toronto
- Owner: Varsity Publications Inc.
- Editor-in-chief: Junia Alsinawi
- Founded: 1880; 146 years ago
- Language: English
- Headquarters: 21 Sussex Avenue; 2nd and 3rd floor; Toronto, Ontario; M5S 1J6
- Country: Canada
- Circulation: 18,000
- ISSN: 0042-2789
- Website: www.thevarsity.ca

The Varsity is the independent student newspaper of the University of Toronto, located in the Greater Toronto Area of Ontario, Canada. In publication since 1880, it is the university's official newspaper of record and the only student-run paper that publishes weekly on all three campuses: Mississauga, St. George, and Scarborough.

Founded as a broadsheet daily, it is now printed in compact form, and publishes print editions during the fall and winter semesters and online throughout the year, along with two seasonal magazines. It primarily focuses on tri-campus affairs and local news. The paper is owned and operated by Varsity Publications Inc., a not-for-profit corporation based on the St. George campus, and is financed by student levies and advertisement revenue.

== History ==
The Varsity began as an independent student newspaper in 1880, with its inaugural issue published on October 7th of that year. It was likely inspired by a now-defunct student newspaper called The White and Blue, founded in 1879.

…Our intentions are very demure: not a guiding star, not an interpreter, but a register of opinion in and out of the University in matters of education; an [unbiased] annalist of University life; and, in this last [connection], a strenuous advocate of what constitutes individual well-being.

— The Varsity, Vol. I, No. 1

At the height of debate on coeducation, the first issue of The Varsity ran an article in favour of admitting women to the University of Toronto. Women were later permitted to join men in lectures in 1884 after years of self-advocacy.

In 1895, the suspension of The Varsity's editor, James Tucker, led Latin Professor Dale to publicly attack the administration in The Globe, which in turn led to his own dismissal. University College students then approved a motion by Varsity editorial staff member William Lyon Mackenzie King and boycotted lectures for a week. King later became Canada's longest-serving prime minister.

After Prime Minister Pierre Trudeau decriminalized homosexuality in 1969, a medical research assistant placed an advertisement in the paper seeking volunteers to establish the first gay and lesbian university association in Canada, the University of Toronto Homophile Association.

By the late 19th century, The Varsity was owned and published by the Students' Administrative Council (SAC; known today as the University of Toronto Students' Union), which determined the paper's annual budget although it had no formal editorial control. The Varsity nonetheless pushed for independence citing concerns of editorial influence due to its financial dependence on the SAC. It had previously been suspended temporarily by the SAC in 1952 over publishing a speech by university president Sidney Smith in which it substituted "English" with "sex" throughout the text.

The SAC endorsed the idea of separation to avoid the burden of covering the paper's budget deficits and legal liability for its publications. The SAC ran a Varsity advertisement in 1979 urging students to vote in a referendum, writing that "a student government cannot actively participate in a newspaper's decisions before its freedom to criticize is jeopardized." A successful referendum was held that year and The Varsity incorporated as a separate entity from the SAC in 1980.

In 2017, The Varsity began publishing a Chinese-language edition of the newspaper on their website.

== Notable past staff ==
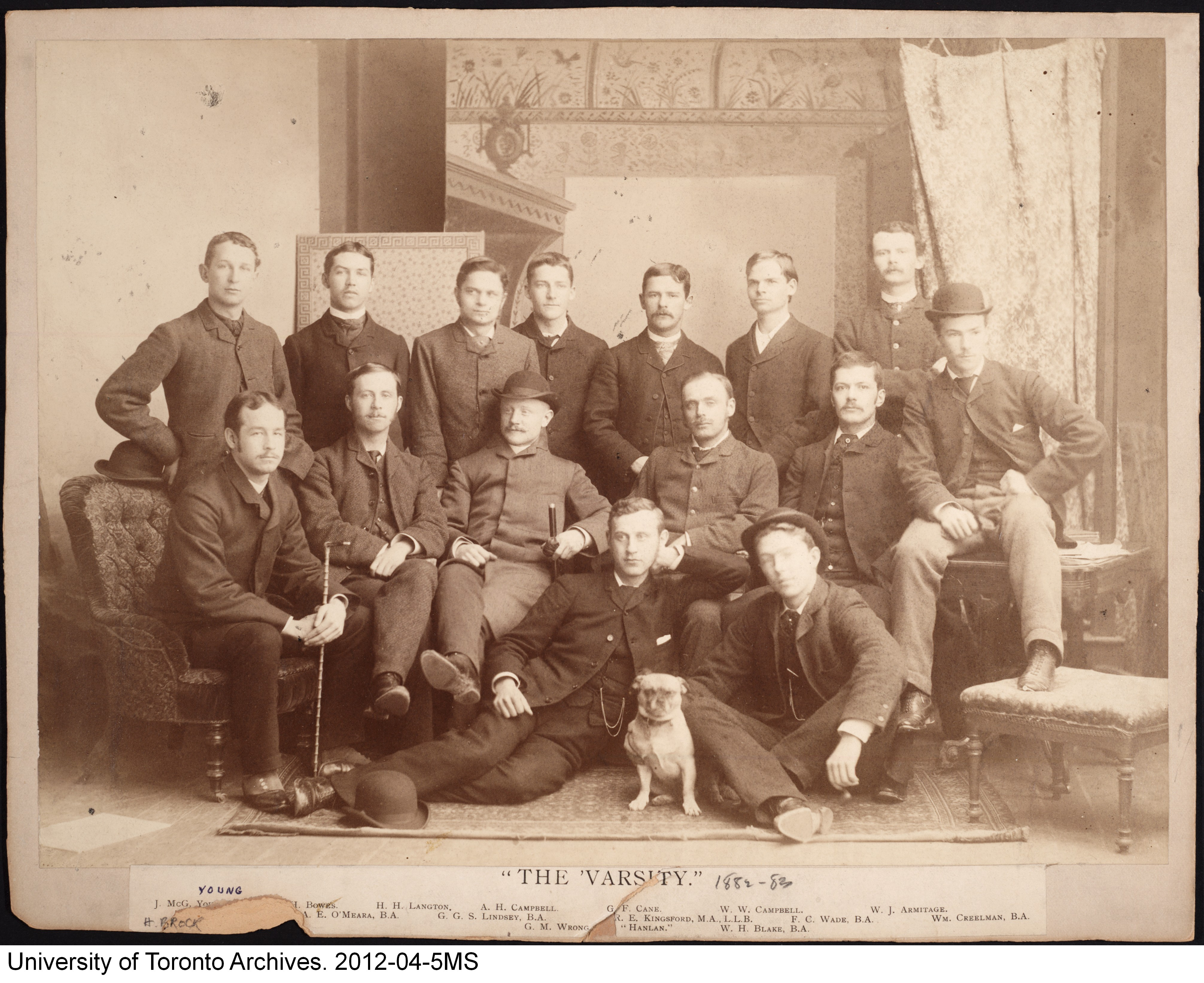
The Varsity staff in 1882–1883

- Peter Gzowski, broadcaster and reporter, host of CBC's Morningside (1982–1997)
- Michael Ignatieff, public intellectual, academic at the John F. Kennedy School of Government, Member of Parliament, and former Leader of the Liberal Party of Canada
- Michael Kesterton, columnist for The Globe and Mail
- William Lyon Mackenzie King, 10th Prime Minister of Canada
- Mark Kingwell, philosopher, fellow of Trinity College, Toronto
- Naomi Klein, journalist, author of No Logo and The Shock Doctrine
- David Megginson, computer software developer
- Jim Proudfoot, sports journalist, sports editor for the Toronto Star
- Chandler Levack, writer and filmmaker
- Linda McQuaig, Toronto Star columnist
- Tom Walkom, Toronto Star columnist
- Bob Rae, Rhodes Scholar, 21st Premier of Ontario, Member of Parliament
- Edward Roberts, 11th Lieutenant Governor of Newfoundland and Labrador
- Frank Shuster and Johnny Wayne, comedians, best known for their work as comedy duo Wayne and Shuster
- Isabel Vincent, journalist for the National Post, former correspondent for The Globe and Mail
- Clive Thompson, journalist and science and technology writer for Wired (magazine)
- Tanya Talaga, journalist, author of Seven Fallen Feathers
- Barbara Amiel, journalist, Maclean's columnist
- Jason Szep, Pulitzer Prize winner and International Affairs Editor with Reuters
- James Laxer, political economist
- John Lorinc, journalist and author, winner of the Balsillie Prize for Public Policy in 2022

== See also ==
- The Medium (University of Toronto Mississauga)
- The Gargoyle (newspaper)
- List of student newspapers in Canada
- List of newspapers in Canada
