= Karin Larsson =

Swedish artist (1859–1928)

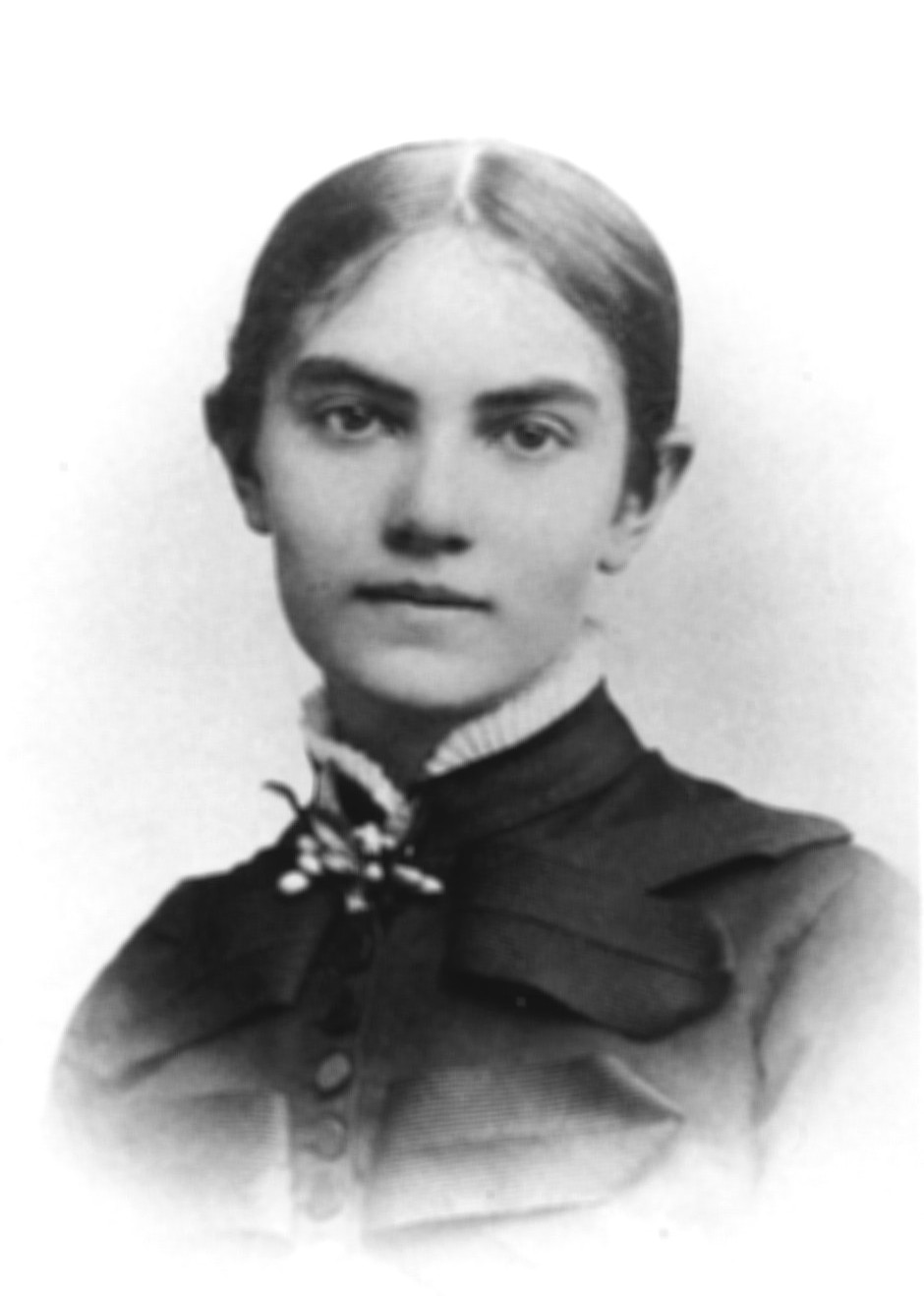
- Bergöö Larsson c. 1882
- Born: 3 October 1859; Örebro, Sweden
- Died: 18 February 1928 (aged 68)
- Education: Royal Swedish Academy of Arts
- Known for: Painting, design
- Spouse: Carl Larsson
- Children: 8

Karin Larsson (née Bergöö; 3 October 1859 – 18 February 1928) was a Swedish artist and (interior) designer. Larsson was famous for her interior designs, textiles, paintings, and furniture designs, which were featured in the Victoria and Albert Museum and the Memorial Sompo Japan Nipponkoa Museum of Art. She worked closely with her husband Carl Larsson, whom she helped with his career.

== Early life and education ==
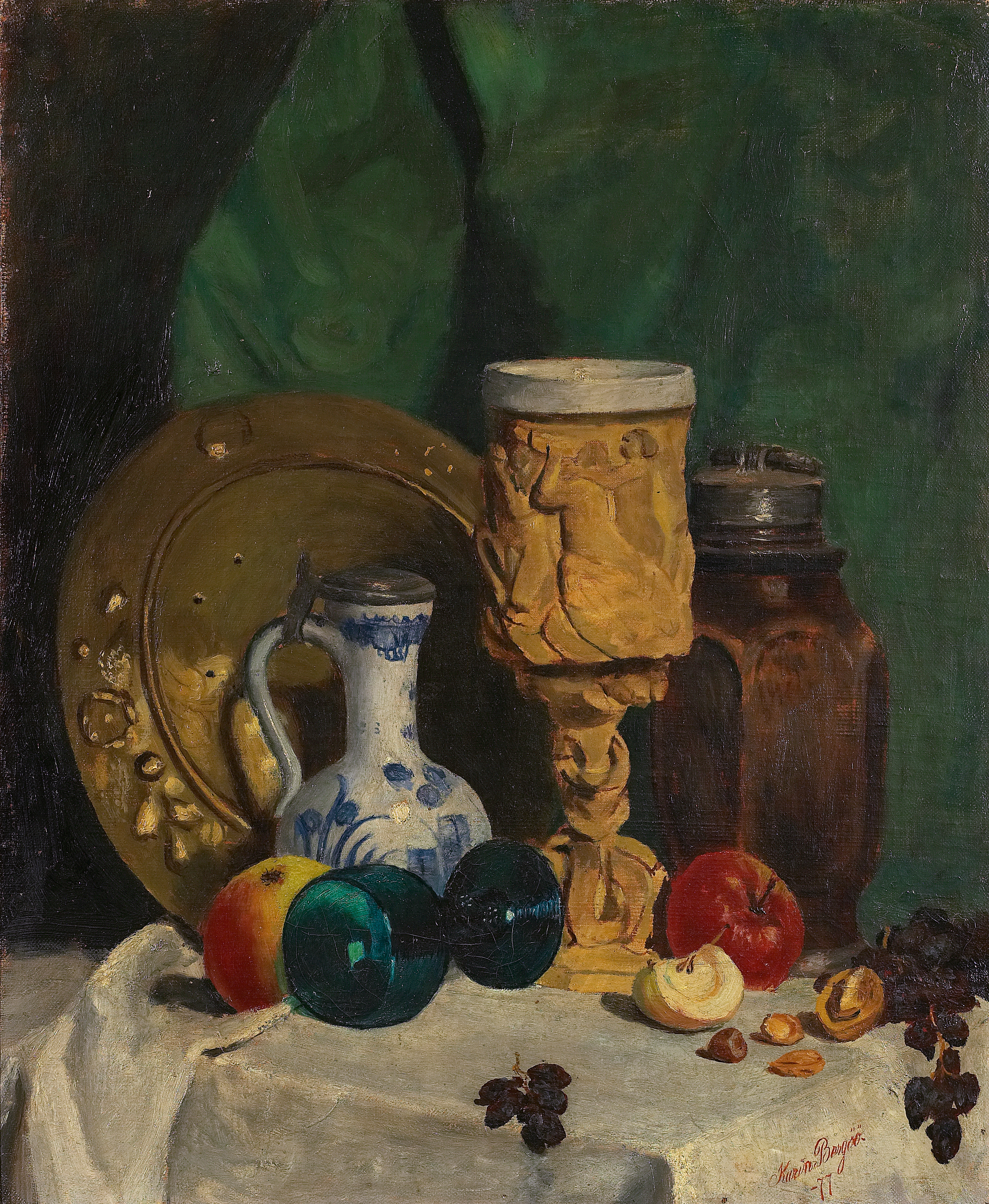
Still Life with Fruit and Tankard, 1877 painting by Karin Bergöö

Karin Bergöö was born in Örebro 3 October 1859 and grew up in nearby Hallsberg, where her father, Adolf Bergöö, was a successful businessman. Her younger sister, Stina, married the English geologist Francis Arthur Bather. Karin showed early artistic talent, and after attending the Franska Skolan in Stockholm, studied at the Slöjdskolan (Handicrafts School; now Konstfack) and from 1877 to 1882 at the Royal Swedish Academy of Arts. After completing her studies there, she went to Paris and studied at Académie Colarossi. While there, she went to Grez-sur-Loing, outside Paris, where there was a colony of Scandinavian artists, to continue painting.

== Life of Karin Bergöo ==
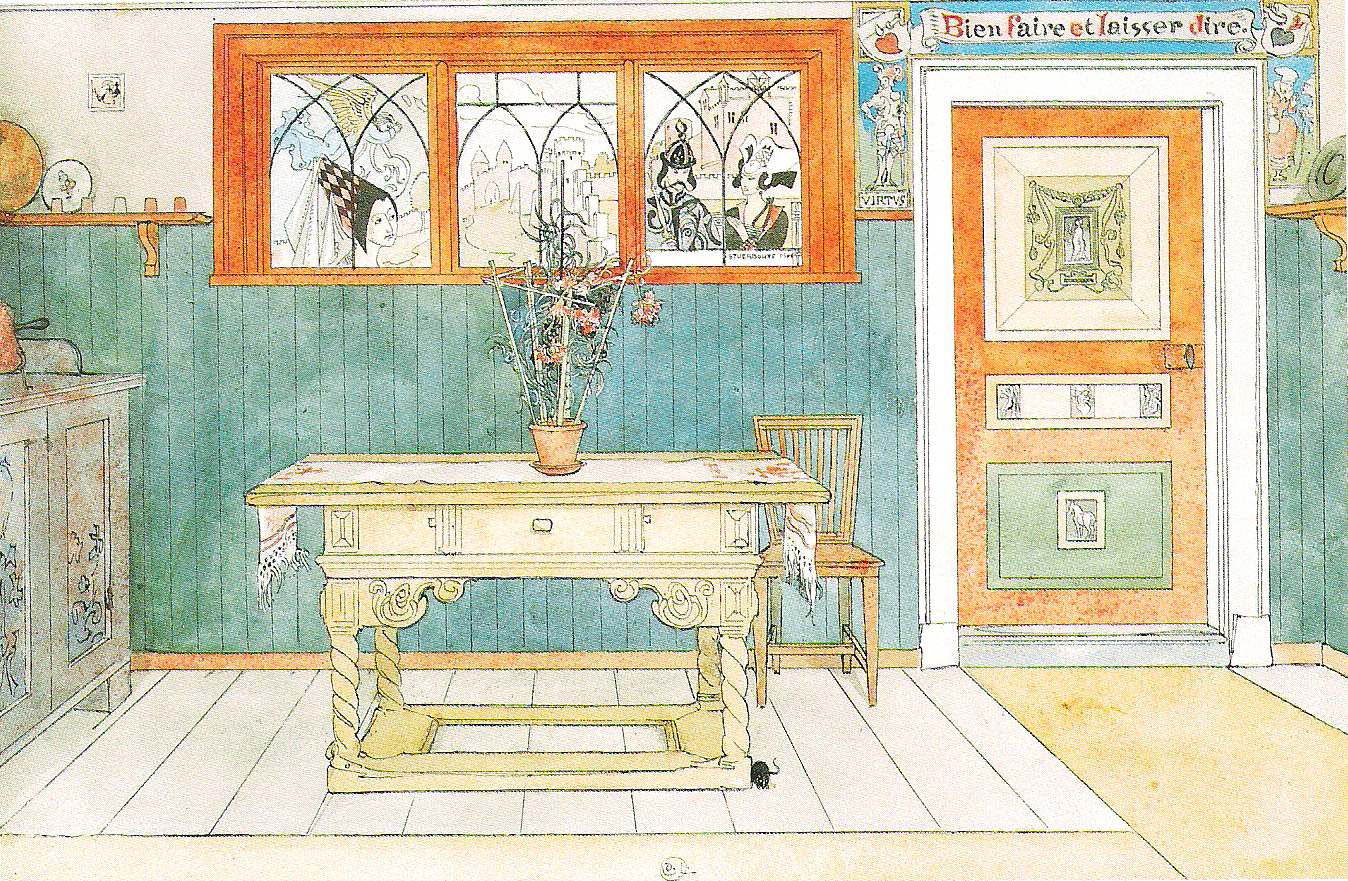
Karin channelled her own artistic impulses into design at her home

In Grez-sur-Loing, where she was a friend of Julia Beck, she met Carl Larsson; they fell in love and in 1883 returned to Stockholm and were married. They then returned together to Grez-sur-Loing, where their first child, Suzanne, was born in 1884. The following year, they returned to Sweden.

In 1888 the Larssons went to Paris, on the suggestion of Pontus Fürstenberg of Gothenburg, who wanted a large painting by Carl to add to his art collection. They left their two children with Karin's parents in Hallsberg, and upon their return a year later, she decorated the Bergöös' new house. They then moved into Lilla Hyttnäs, a cottage in Sundborn near Falun where her father had been born. They enlarged it as their family grew to include 8 children, and it became known as Carl Larsson-gården. Carl died in 1919; after Karin's death in 1928, the cottage became a biographical museum. As they came to need still more space, they also designed two guest cottages.

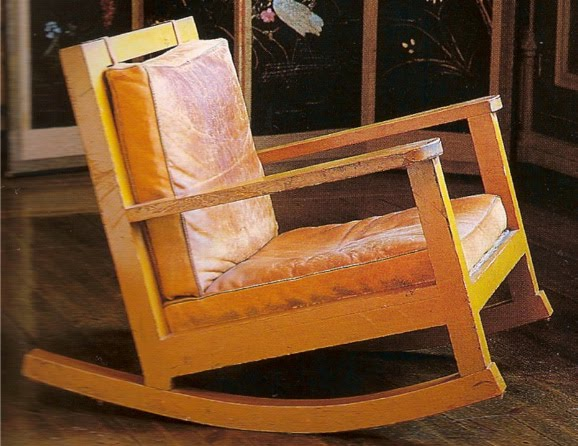
Rocking chair designed by Karin Larsson

Karin acted as a sounding-board and critic for Carl's work, in addition to being his primary model. With children and a large house to manage, she channelled her own artistic impulses into design. She designed and wove a large amount of the textiles used in the house, embroidered, and designed clothes for herself and the children and furniture which was created by a local carpenter. For example, the pinafores worn by her and other women who worked at Sundborn, known as karinförkläde in Swedish, were a practical design by her. The style in which the house was decorated and furnished to Karin's designs, depicted in Carl's paintings, created a new, recognisably Swedish style: "In total contrast to the prevailing style of dark heavy furnishings, its bright interiors incorporated an innovative blend of Swedish folk design and fin-de-siècle influences, including Japonisme and Arts and Crafts ideas from Britain." In the "Swedish room" with which she replaced the little used drawing room, she removed curtains and placed furniture along the walls around a raised dais, creating a room within a room that was much used by the family, as shown in Carl's paintings, with a sofa in a corner for naps, shown in Lathörnet (Lazy nook). Her textile designs and colours were also new: "Pre-modern in character they introduced a new abstract style in tapestry. Her bold compositions were executed in vibrant colours; her embroidery frequently used stylised plants. In black and white linen she reinterpreted Japanese motifs."

Larsson died on 17 February 1928 and is buried at Sundborn cemetery.

== Legacy ==
In 1997, Victoria and Albert Museum in London showed her interior design at the Carl Larsson exhibition.

In 2009, she was featured in an exhibition in Sundborn.

In 2018, the exhibition Carl Larsson and His Home: Art of the Swedish Lifestyle at Seiji Togo Memorial Sompo Japan Nipponkoa Museum of Art showed textiles created by Karin and paintings of their home created by Carl.

In 2024, the National Gallery of Art in Washington acquired her oil portrait of Pierre Louis Alexandre, painted in 1879–1880.

== In popular culture ==
Katherine Ashenburg's 2018 novel Sofie & Cecilia is a fictionalised retelling of her life.

== Paintings ==
Painting by Karin Larsson

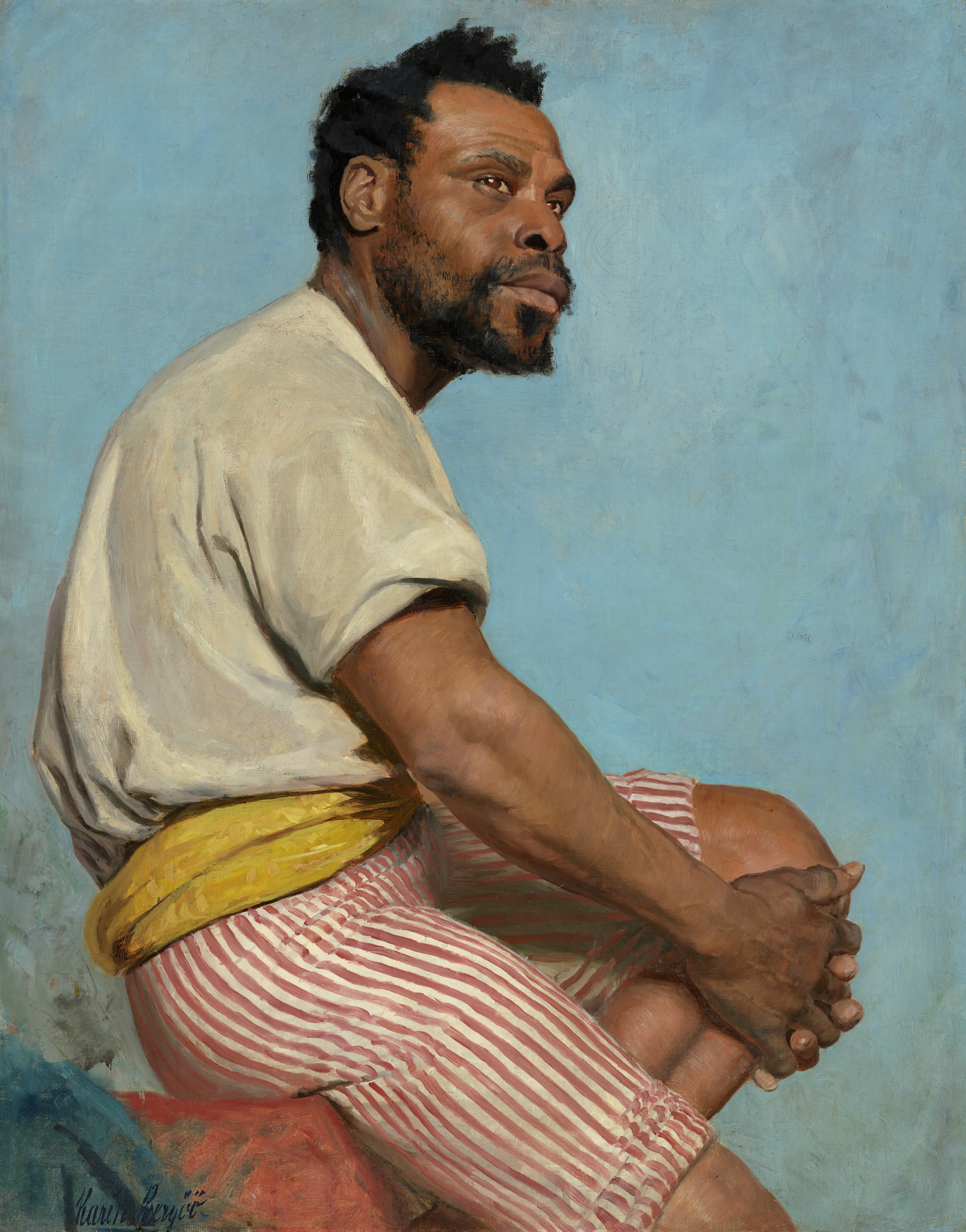
Pierre Louis Alexandre
Paintings of Karin Larsson by her husband, Carl Larsson

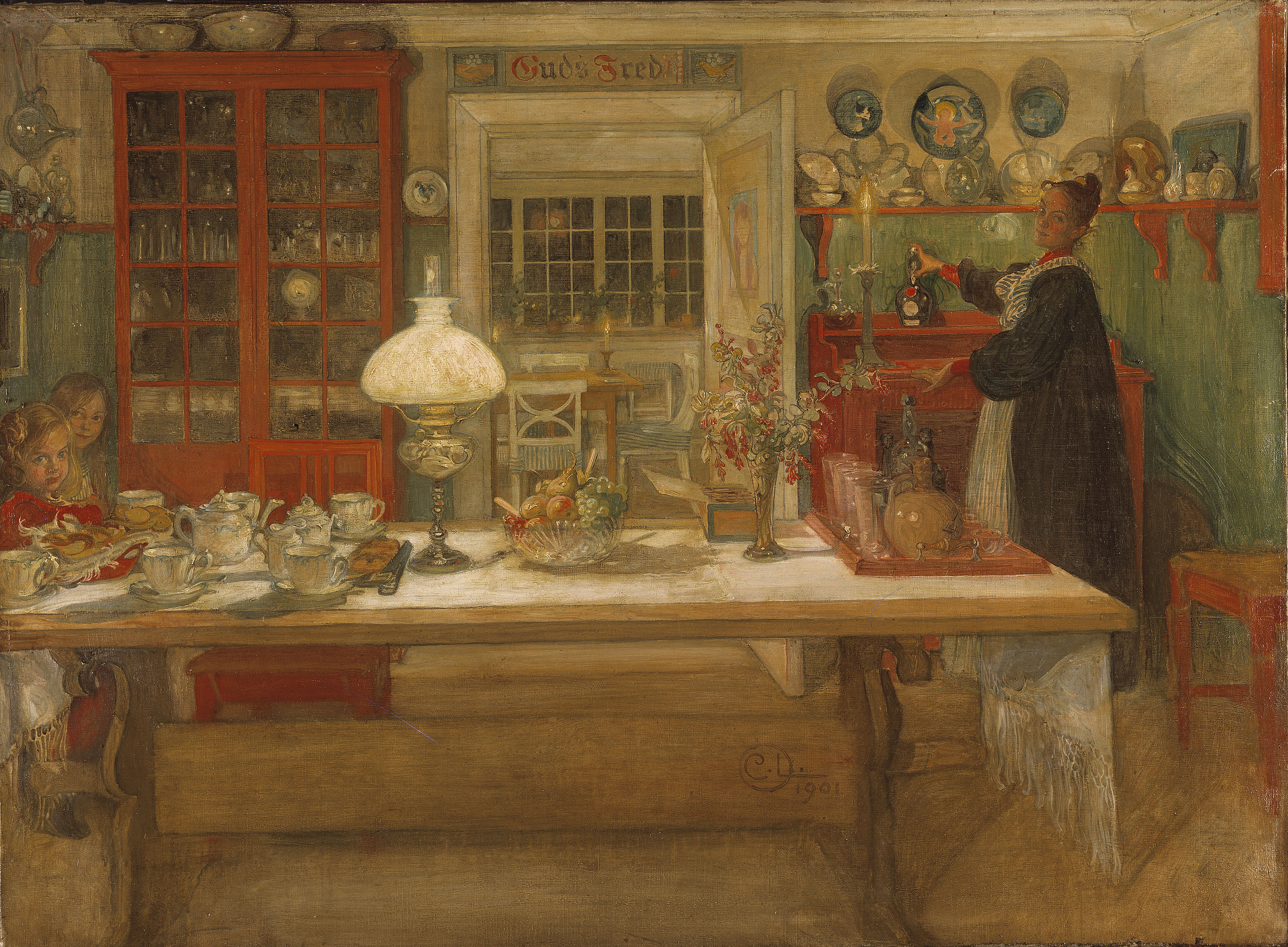
In her kitchen with her children, 1901

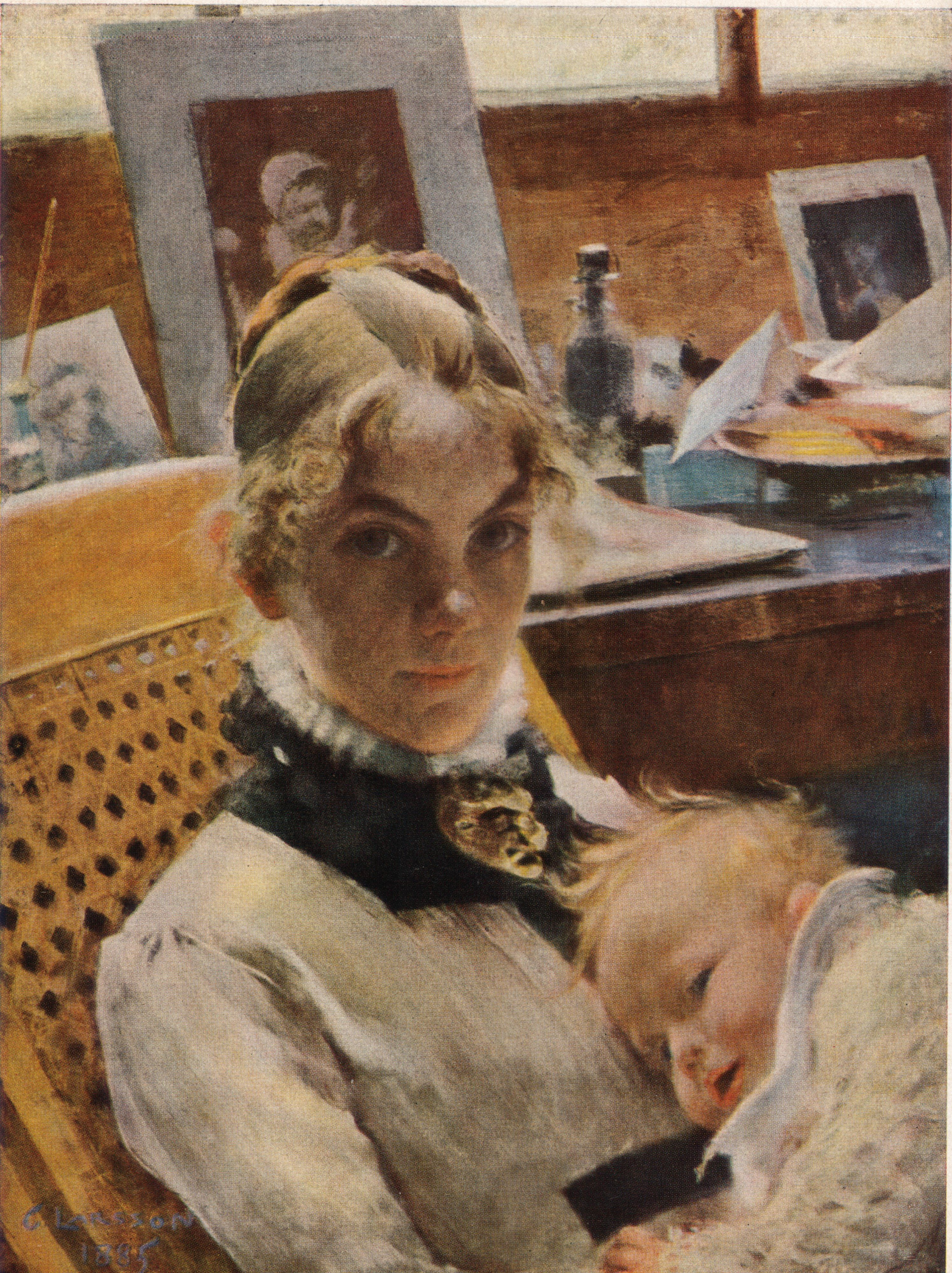
With her daughter Suzanne in Grez-sur-Loing, 1885

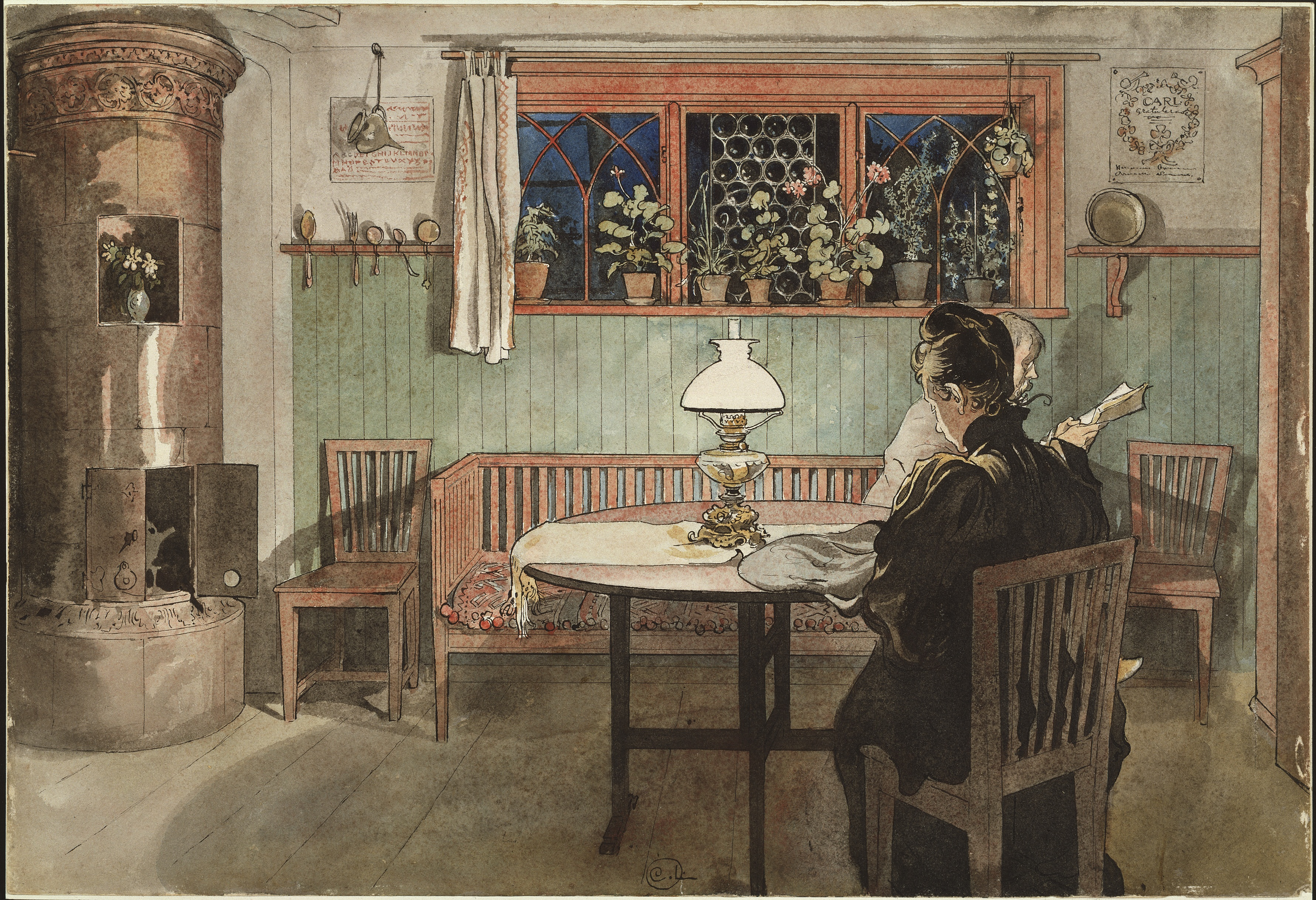
When the Children have Gone to Bed, 1901
