= Anna Mehler Paperny =

Canadian journalist and writer

- Born: Toronto, Ontario, Canada
- Education: Queen's University at Kingston
- Occupations: Journalist, author
- Notable work: Hello I Want to Die Please Fix Me (2019 memoir)
- Awards: Dan McArthur Award
- Website: annamehlerpaperny.com

Anna Mehler Paperny is a Canadian journalist and the author of Hello I Want to Die Please Fix Me.

== Early life and education ==
Mehler Paperny was born in Toronto and raised in Vancouver by her parents David Paperny and Audrey Mehler who are both documentary producers. Her paternal grandfather was Maurice Paperny.

She studied at Queen's University at Kingston where she was the editor-in-chief of the student-run newspaper The Queen's Journal for its 135th volume, from 2007 until 2008.

== Career ==
As a journalist, Mehler Paperny has reported for Reuters, The Kingston Whig-Standard, the Edmonton Journal, the San Francisco Chronicle, Maclean’s, and has been employed as a staff reporter for Global News and The Globe and Mail. She received the Radio Television Digital News Association's Dan McArthur Award for her investigative reporting into deaths in Canadian prisons.

Her 2019 memoir Hello I Want to Die Please Fix Me about her experiences of major depressive disorder and suicidal ideation was nominated for the Hilary Weston Writers' Trust Prize for Nonfiction in 2019.

== Personal life ==
In 2022, Mehler Paperny was based in Toronto.

Mehler Paperny attempted suicide during September 2011 and then again multiple times since, including in 2019.
