= Ernest Hillen =

Canadian writer and journalist

- Born: Netherlands
- Occupations: journalist, writer
- Writing career
- Genre: memoir
- Notable works: The Way of a Boy, Small Mercies

Ernest Hillen is a Canadian writer and journalist. A longtime editor with Saturday Night, he became best known for two memoirs which he published in the 1990s about his childhood experiences during World War II.

== Background ==
Hillen was born in the Netherlands in 1934 as the child of a Canadian mother and a Dutch father, and the family moved to West Java, Indonesia when he was a child. However, following the Japanese occupation of the Dutch East Indies in 1942, the family was confined to detention camps for several years. After the war ended the family moved between Canada, the Netherlands and Indonesia for several years until the 1950s, when Hillen moved to Toronto.

== Writing career ==
He took his first job in journalism with the German-language newspaper Torontoer Zeitung, and was later a contributor to Weekend, The Idler, the Toronto Star, The Globe and Mail and The Wall Street Journal before joining Saturday Night.

While with Saturday Night, he wrote his first piece of personal journalism about his childhood. The piece, titled "The Swimming Pool", appeared in the 1990 anthology The Saturday Night Traveller. During his career, he also wrote a number of radio plays for CBC Radio.

His first book-length memoir, The Way of a Boy, was published in 1993 and detailed his childhood experiences in Indonesia. The book was a shortlisted nominee for the Trillium Book Awards in 1994. In 1995, the Japanese publishing company Kodansha bought the rights to release a translated Japanese language edition of the memoir, making it one of the first accounts of the Indonesian occupation ever published in that country.

A sequel, Small Mercies: A Boy After War, was published in 1997, and won the inaugural Viacom Writers' Trust Prize for Nonfiction.

In 2008, Hillen published A Weekend Memoir, about his experiences travelling across Canada as a journalist. Both The Way of a Boy and Small Mercies were also reissued that year. A Memoir in Pieces, published in 2017, continued in the same vein as A Weekend Memoir, with profiles of Canadians prominent in the 1960s, 1970s, and 1980s, such as Bob Homme (The Friendly Giant) and singer Alannah Myles, as well as accounts of his travels as a journalist and childhood in Indonesia.
