= Taras Grescoe =

Canadian non-fiction writer

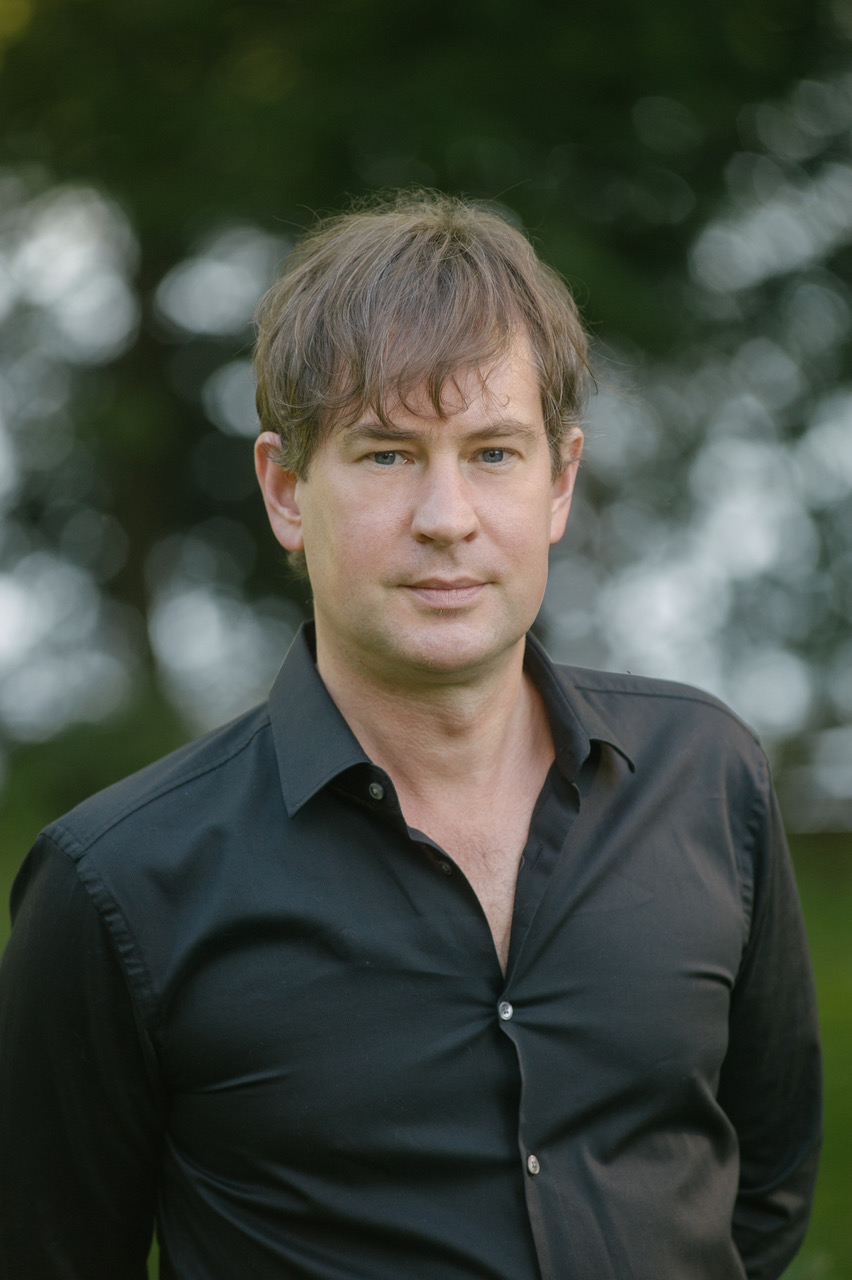
- Born: 1966 (age 59–60); Toronto, Canada
- Occupation: Writer
- Writing career
- Notable awards: Mavis Gallant Prize for Non-Fiction (2000, 2008, 2012, 2020); McAuslan First Book Prize (2000); Edna Staebler Award (2001); Hilary Weston Writers' Trust Prize for Nonfiction (2008); IACP Cookbook Award for Literary Food Writing (2009)
- Website: taras-grescoe.com

Taras Grescoe (born 1966) is a Canadian non-fiction writer. His debut book, Sacré Blues, won the Edna Staebler Award for Creative Non-Fiction, Mavis Gallant Prize for Non-Fiction, and McAuslan First Book Prize. His fourth book, Bottomfeeder, won the Hilary Weston Writers' Trust Prize for Nonfiction, awarded to the best work of non-fiction by a Canadian writer, in 2008, as well as the IACP Award for Literary Food Writing. He is the author of eight books, which have been translated into German, French, Chinese, and Japanese, and his articles and essays have been published in a dozen anthologies.

== Biography ==
Grescoe was born in 1966, in Toronto, and grew up in Vancouver, where he graduated from the University of British Columbia, with a degree in English literature, in 1988.

From 1990 to 1994, Grescoe taught English in Paris, after which he moved to Montreal and began working as a travel journalist. He has since contributed to Canadian Geographic, The New York Times, the Wall Street Journal, Travel + Leisure, The Smithsonian, Monocle, Afar, National Geographic, Food & Wine, Salon, L'actualité, The New Yorker, the Financial Times,The Independent, The Guardian, Salon, National Geographic Traveler, the Times of London, Gourmet, Wired, the Chicago Tribune Magazine, and Condé Nast Traveller.

His book, Bottomfeeder: How to Eat Ethically in a World of Vanishing Seafood has also been published as Dead Seas: How the Fish on Our Plates is Killing the Planet (Pan/Macmillan 2012).

Since the publication of Straphanger, he has published op-eds, given keynotes, and developed a social media following commenting on urbanism, transit, and active transport. Since 2023, he has written a regular newsletter for the Quebec newsmagazine L'actualité on trains, transit, urbanism, and sustainable transportation.

He has served as juror at the Canada Council for the Arts (publishing) and for the Marian Hebb Research Grant. Since the beginning of 2023, he has been a professor of Creative Writing, specializing in literary journalism, at Concordia University in Montreal. In the spring of 2025, he taught literary journalism at the Banff Centre for the Arts in Alberta.

He lives in Outremont, Quebec.

== Awards and honours ==
In 2022, Grescoe won a Marian Hebb Research Grant, which is intended to support "inquiry and exploration relevant to Canadian publishing, writing and visual arts, and toward the realization of a publishable work in progress." He is a fellow of the Fondation Michalski in Montricher, Switzerland, where he worked during a six-week residency in the summer of 2022.

In addition to the below, Hélène Rioux's translation of Bottomfeeder was shortlisted for The Cole Foundation Prize for Translation in 2010.

Awards for Grescoe's writing
Year	Title	Award	Result	Ref.
2000	Sacré Blues	Hilary Weston Writers' Trust Prize for Nonfiction	Shortlist	
2000	Sacré Blues	Mavis Gallant Prize for Non-Fiction	Winner	
2000	Sacré Blues	McAuslan First Book Prize	Winner	
2001	Sacré Blues	Edna Staebler Award for Creative Non-Fiction	Winner	
2003	The End of Elsewhere	Hilary Weston Writers' Trust Prize for Nonfiction	Shortlist	
2003	The End of Elsewhere	Mavis Gallant Prize for Non-Fiction	Shortlist	
2008	Bottomfeeder	Hilary Weston Writers' Trust Prize for Nonfiction	Winner	
2008	Bottomfeeder	IACP Award for Literary Food Writing	Winner	
2012	Straphanger	Hilary Weston Writers' Trust Prize for Nonfiction	Shortlist	
2012	Straphanger	Mavis Gallant Prize for Non-Fiction	Winner	
2013	Straphanger	Shaughnessy Cohen Prize for Political Writing	Shortlist	
2016	Shanghai Grand	B.C. National Award for Canadian Nonfiction	Shortlist	
2016	Shanghai Grand	Mavis Gallant Prize for Non-Fiction	Shortlist	
2020	Possess the Air	Mavis Gallant Prize for Non-Fiction	Winner	

== Books ==
- Sacré Blues: An Unsentimental Journey Through Quebec (2000)
- The End of Elsewhere: Travels Among the Tourists (2003)
- The Devil's Picnic: Around the World in Pursuit of Forbidden Fruit (2005)
- Bottomfeeder: How to Eat Ethically in a World of Vanishing Seafood (2008)
- Straphanger: Saving Our Cities and Ourselves from the Automobile (2012)
- Shanghai Grand: Forbidden Love and International Intrigue in a Doomed World (2016)
- Possess the Air: Love, Heroism, and the Battle for the Soul of Mussolini's Rome (2019)
- The Lost Supper: Searching for the Future of Food in the Flavors of the Past (2023)
