= Michael Kesterton =

Canadian columnist (1946–2018)

Michael Kesterton (1946–2018) was a columnist with The Globe and Mail. His weekday column, "Social Studies," was published from June 12, 1990 until July 1, 2013.

== Early life ==
Kesterton's father was a professional photographer and trade publication writer and his mother was a real estate agent. The person he credits with inspiring his career in journalism was his uncle, Wilf Kesterton, a journalism professor at Carleton University in Ottawa, Ontario.

He attended the University of Toronto, where he studied mathematics, physics and psychology. He also worked on the student newspaper, The Varsity, alongside future notables such as Michael Ignatieff and Bob Rae. One contemporary recalls that he was already known for his "quirky humour" and as a "lover of trivia, oddball facts and the offbeat."

== Career ==
In 1969, Kesterton began working at The Globe and Mail as a proofreader. After seven years he moved to the computer room. He was there for two years before being promoted to a copy editor for newspaper's business section, Report on Business. He worked briefly as a Business feature writer and Technology section editor.

In 1990, the Globe underwent a content and design revamp. Then Editor-in-chief, William Thorsell selected Kesterton to create a column consisting of short, often unusual pieces for the back page of the A section. It was to be called Social Studies and carry a "strong interest agenda". On May 21, 1990, Kesterton started compiling stories for his new column. The redesign was launched on June 12, 1990 and his column became an instant success.

Unlike most journalists, Kesterton did not conduct interviews or undertake original research. All of his items were drawn from other sources, which he cited, drawing on 120 websites, newspaper and library archives for the five or six stories for each day's column. The column was tagged as "a daily miscellany of information."

"There are hundreds of reporters who can do a better job at [news stories] than I ever could… The light-hearted hack work that I am doing isn't hugely important and will never win journalism awards, but I'm better at it than anyone I know and readers often love the columns and tell me so. There are worse ways to earn a living." – Michael Kesterton

In 1996, Kesterton's book Social Studies was published. His second book, The Twelve Best Months of the Year, was published in 1998.

In 2007, Kesterton completed writing a novel set in Africa in 1925. Information about publication is not known.

== Death ==
On December 5, 2018, Michael Kesterton died at the age of 72. His death was attributed to Parkinson's-related pneumonia.
