= Jake MacDonald =

Canadian author (1949–2020)

- Born: John Monahan MacDonald; April 6, 1949; Winnipeg, Manitoba, Canada
- Died: January 30, 2020 (aged 70); Puerto Vallarta, Mexico
- Education: University of Manitoba
- Occupation: Author

John Monahan MacDonald (April 6, 1949 – January 30, 2020), writing as Jake MacDonald, was a Canadian author. MacDonald produced eight books and several hundred articles in Canadian magazines.

Born in Winnipeg, Manitoba, MacDonald was an alumnus of St. Paul's High School, Winnipeg, Class of 1967. MacDonald received a BA in English from the University of Manitoba in 1971. After graduation, MacDonald was a carpenter and fishing guide before becoming a full-time writer.

Over twenty-five years he produced ten books of both fiction and non-fiction, numerous short-stories and about two hundred stories for many of Canada's leading publications, including The Globe and Mail, Outdoor Canada, Canadian Geographic, Maclean's, Cottage Life, Canadian Business and The Walrus. His writing netted over twenty-five awards. The memoir Houseboat Chronicles: Notes from a Life in Shield Country won three awards across the country, including the Pearson Writers' Trust Prize for Nonfiction in 2002.

His 1997 young adult novel Juliana and the Medicine Fish was made into a feature film in 2015. In 2019, his first play The Cottage was staged at Royal Manitoba Theatre Centre's John Hirsch Mainstage. Also in 2019, MacDonald won the Winnipeg Arts Council "Making a Mark Award."

MacDonald died on January 30, 2020, after a fall in a home that he was building in Puerto Vallarta. He was 70.

== Works ==
- Indian River - 1981
- The Bridge Out of Town - 1986
- Two Tickets to Paradise - 1990
- Raised by the River - 1992
- Juliana and the Medicine Fish - 1997
- The Lake: An Illustrated History of Manitobans' Cottage Country - 2001
- Houseboat Chronicles: Notes from a Life in Shield Country - 2002
- With the Boys: Field Notes on Being a Guy - 2005
- Grizzlyville: Adventures in Bear Country - 2009
- Casting Quiet Waters: Reflections on Life and Fishing (edited) - 2014
