= Spirit to Soar =

- Directed by: Tanya Talaga; Michelle Derosier
- Written by: Tanya Talaga
- Produced by: Nida Marji
- Cinematography: Sean Stiller
- Edited by: Eui Yong Zong
- Music by: Ansley Simpson
- Distributed by: Blue Ant Media
- Release date: April 29, 2021 (Hot Docs)
- Running time: 46 minutes
- Country: Canada
- Language: English

Spirit to Soar is a 2021 Canadian documentary film, directed by Tanya Talaga and Michelle Derosier. A followup to Talaga's award-winning 2017 book Seven Fallen Feathers: Racism, Death and Hard Truths in a Northern City, the film updates the story of the deaths of several indigenous teenagers in Thunder Bay, Ontario, centring in part on the effects of their deaths on surviving family members.

The film premiered at the 2021 Hot Docs Canadian International Documentary Festival, where it won the Audience Award in the mid-length film category. It was subsequently acquired for theatrical distribution by Blue Ant Media.
