= Happy City =

Book by Charles Montgomery

Happy City: Transforming Our Lives Through Urban Design
- North American hardcover edition (2013)
- Author: Charles Montgomery
- Language: English
- Genre: Urban planning, Nonfiction
- Publisher: Farrar, Straus and Giroux, Random House, Penguin Books
- Publication date: 2013
- Publication place: United States, Canada, UK
- Media type: Print & Digital
- Pages: 359 pp (first edition)
- ISBN: 978-0-374-16823-0

Happy City: Transforming Our Lives Through Urban Design is a 2013 book written by the Canadian author Charles Montgomery.

== Overview ==
Gathering insights from the disciplines of psychology, neuroscience, urban planning and Montgomery’s own social experiments, the book makes the case that the manner in which we build our cities alters the way in which we feel, think, and behave as individuals and as a society. Montgomery argues that the happy city, the green city, and the low-carbon city are the same place, and we can all help build it.

Montgomery states that the book is about "seeing our city streets, hearts, and mobility systems as emotional infrastructure that can make or break the health or happiness of our citizens." From Stockton, California to Bogotá, Colombia, Montgomery discusses the urban challenges cities face and the innovative solutions being implemented all over the world to empower communities.

The book was a Finalist for the Shaughnessy Bishop-Cohen Prize for Political Writing and Charles Taylor Prize for Non-fiction, and a Winner of the Robert Bruss Real Estate Book Awards. It was also a shortlisted nominee for the 2014 Hilary Weston Writers' Trust Prize for Nonfiction.

The success of the book led Charles Montgomery to found the consulting firm, Happy Cities, which seeks to turn the lessons of the book into action by offering urban planning, design, and research consulting services to municipalities.

== Content ==
The book contains 13 chapters and an epilogue:

1. The Mayor of Happy
2. The City has Always Been a Happiness Project
3. The (Broken) Social Scene
4. How We Got Here
5. Getting it Wrong
6. How to be Closer
7. Convivialities
8. Mobilicities I: How Moving Feels, and Why It Does Not Feel Better
9. Mobilicities II: Freedom
10. Who Is The City For?
11. Everything Is Connected to Everything Else
12. Retrofitting Sprawl
13. Save Your City, Save Yourself
