= All Our Relations =

2018 non-fiction book by Tanya Talaga

- First edition
- Author: Tanya Talaga
- Genre: Current affairs
- Published: House of Anansi Press
- Publication date: 2018
- ISBN: 978-1-48700-573-3

All Our Relations: Finding the Path Forward is a 2018 book by Anishinaabe journalist Tanya Talaga about the colonisation of Indigenous peoples in Canada and internationally.

== Publication ==
All Our Relations is written by journalist and author Tanya Talaga who has written for The Toronto Star and the Globe and Mail. It follows Talaga's first book Seven Fallen Feathers. All Our Relations: Finding the Path Forward was also the title of a Massey Lecture delivered by Talaga. The book has five chapters.

== Synopsis ==
Building on work already shared in the author's 2017 book Seven Fallen Feathers, All Our Relations documents the oppression of Indigenous people in Canada, as well as those in Australia, Brazil, the US, and Scandinavia. It notes the same pattern of colonisers separating Indigenous people from their traditional ways of living, their land, and their languages as part under the label of "civilizing" or "saving" them. It cites examples of the Sixties Scoop in Canada and the extermination of Indigenous peoples in Brazil as part of an endeavour to produce rubber in the 1950s.

The book deals with the prevalence of suicide amongst Indigenous youth in Canada since the establishment of the residential school system in Canada and attributing the suicide prevalence to the cultural genocide. The book also documents efforts to prevent suicide in Nunavut, Seabird Island, and Greenland.

== Critical reception ==
Kamal Al-Solaylee, writing in Quill & Quire praised Talaga for her ability to connect present and past events, demonstrating how Indigenous children today are living with the legacy of Canada's colonial history. CBC Books identified All Our Relations as one of the best Canadian nonfiction books of 2018.

It was one of five books shortlisted for the British Academy’s Nayef Al-Rodhan Prize for Global Cultural Understanding.

Politician and journalist Marci Ien described the book as her all time favourite.
