= Franska Skolan =

Ecole Française
- Franska Skolan
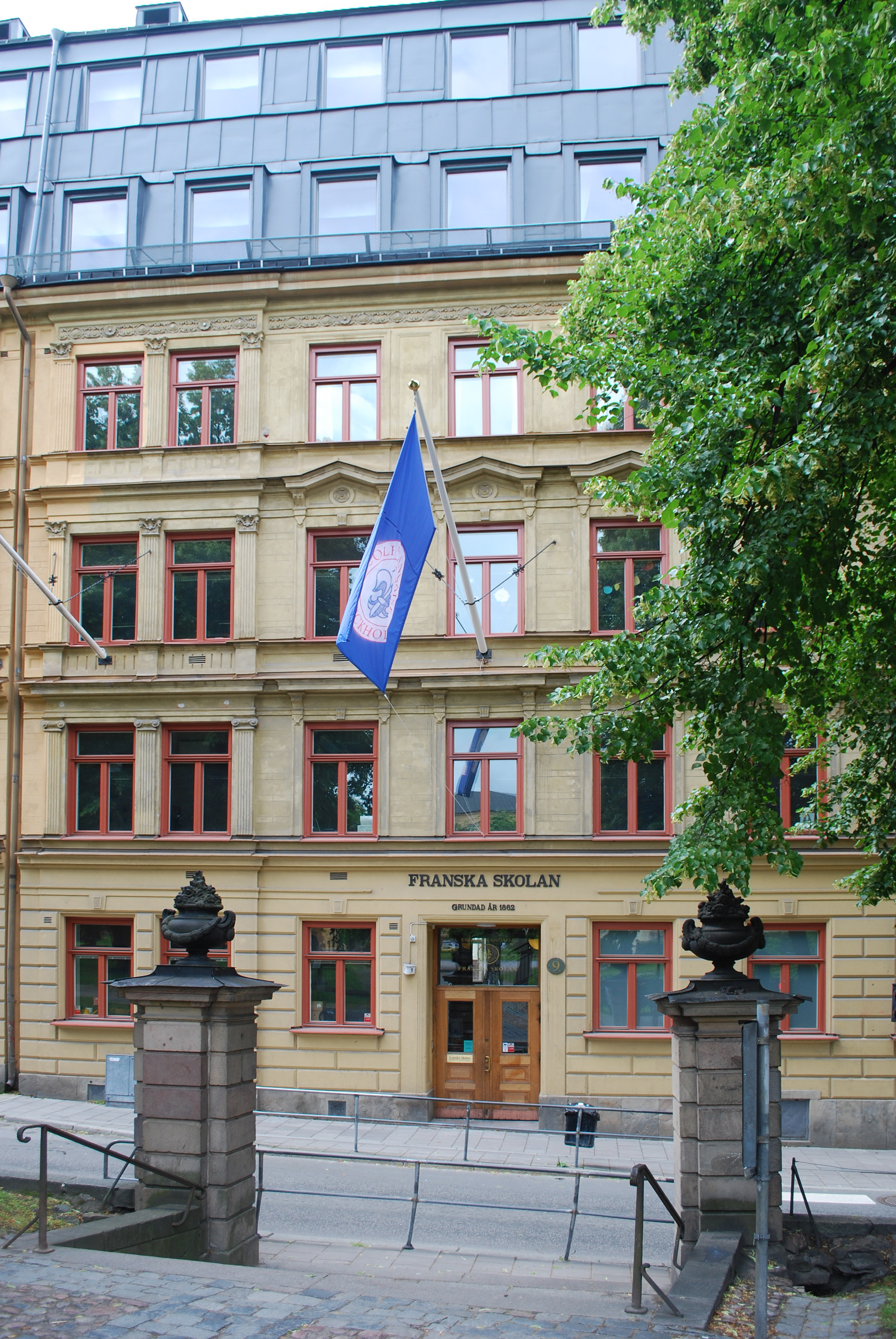

Location
- Döbelnsgatan 9 Stockholm, 111 40; Sweden; 59.33863°N 18.063371°E

Information
- School type: private school
- Founded: 1862
- Chairman: Johan Stenberg
- Principal: Björn Kullgard
- Grades: Preschool, 1–12
- Slogan: Liberté Égalité Fraternité

Franska Skolan (English: French School) is a private school located in Stockholm, Sweden. It was founded in 1862 as a girls' school of the Roman Catholic religious congregation Sisters of St. Joseph from France.

The school follows the Swedish system of education, but all the students study French. The school's students are mainly Swedish children, but also francophone students study there. The current head principal is Björn Kullgard.

== The first years on Kammakargatan 36 ==
The small farm on Kammakargatan 36 was purchased by Mary de Champs in 1862, a French-speaking Belgian woman who was born in England. She already came to Sweden in 1850 for her son Jean, who would become a naval officer and educated in Sweden. Along with Florentine Modelon she received the support of the Catholic Church in their home country to start a school in Sweden, and in October 1862 they found the property on Kammakargatan. An important decision behind this was the so-called authorization letter signed by Charles XV July 4, 1868 and gave mademoiselle Modelon right to buy and own real estate in Sweden, even though they were Catholics. The property went for a total of 22,600 francs, approximately 1,026,381 Swedish kronor today. In the small garden behind the house they started the school that began to operate in October. The property was located in a rural part of Stockholm that was not so built up.

Madame de Champs was responsible for teaching while Mademoiselle Modelon studied Swedish. Otherwise they were joined by the French girl Josefine Chervai, who served as a maid and Anders Jansson as a farmhand. In 1865 the school had 22 Catholic girls enrolled, mostly children of poor workers and craftsmen in Stockholm. During this time, the school was also a combined orphanage, first in 1869 pupils began living at home while studying at the school. Sisters came continuously from France to serve as teachers in French at school, and Swedish teachers educated the students in Swedish. The economy during this time remained strained despite annual contributions from the Catholic L'Oeuvre pontificale de la propagation de la foi in Lyon, and they were completely dependent on this.

== Moving and the years on Drottninggatan 108 ==
In 1868 it was decided to move the school; now the number of students reached 55. The property is Drottninggatan 108 was an enclosed courtyard with two more houses. A woman who came to play a big role in the early school years on Drottninggatan was Jenny Müller. She was the daughter of one of six Swedish women who in 1858 was exiled in the so-called convert process. These women had converted to Catholicism and had to leave Sweden. Jenny Müller thus grew up in France. In 1862, 18 years old, she returned to Sweden. In 1870, two years after the school's relocation, mademoiselle Modelon died only 41 years old on 13 April.

In the coming years on Drottninggatan the school changed radically. Between 1872 and 1878 the number of students doubled from 43 to 112. And where the school initially had poor students the bourgeoisie now started to put their children in the school, there was certainly an attraction to the French language and culture, which they believed to be refined. The school did not deny students based on politics or economics, and famous socialist Hjalmar Branting enrolled his daughter Sonja in the school in 1897, where she was well received.

During the 1880s had sanitary conditions deteriorated substantially in Stockholm and Albert Lindhagen presented a plan that would transform Stockholm into a modern stone town. Drottninggatan, where the school is now based, would change and the school building were to be demolished. Therefore, the school again had to look for new properties. At the end of 1909 they found what they were looking for, at Döbelnsgatan 7 and 9. A major renovation was needed because there were homes in the houses, and October 1, 1910 the school bought the property for 230 000, in today's money 12,200,663 SEK . The last graduation at Drottninggatan 108 were held on 30 May 1911.

== Döbelnsgatan and the hills surrounding St. John's Church ==
October 15, 1911 the inauguration were held at the new property at Döbelnsgatan, and the party took place in the new bright gymnasium, which was considered very modern for its time. Dagens Nyheter wrote a summary of the inauguration: "Towards the end of his speech d: r Westrin turned to the French Minister Thiébaud, who along with his sister had been one of the school's first disciples, and spoke in French. The French Minister thanked d:r Westin and wished the school success, they sang Gounod's' Gloire à toi 'and the beautiful party was over. The school, which currently has over 100 pupils, is wished well upon the bright, beautiful facilities, it now has received. In the first and second floor are classrooms, common rooms, and teacher's lounge located. .. In the uppermost floor of the school foreign and some Swedish teachers reside". The school's new premises at Döbelnsgatan is located on Brunkebergsåsen northern heights, beautifully located next to St. John's Church, Stockholm.

In the late 1920s began to organize travel to France, with the first trip to Cognac in 1929, which today has developed into exchange studies to Morocco and Canada, but also other parts of the Francophone world.

== Present ==
1968 was the first year with boys in the school, who came from Carlsson's school because of lack of space there and sent a few students without telling that they were boys. Since 1973, both girls and boys attend the school. 40% of school students today are boys. Primary school students wear today the classic blue coats with the school emblem on the left side of the chest, which was introduced when the school uniform vanished, to prevent private clothes enhancing snobbery.

== School building ==
The current school building at Döbelnsgatan 9 was rebuilt for the French school in 1911. Originally it was built in 1874 after C N Söderbergs drawings. In 2010 the school acquired the property on Döbelnsgatan 3, also called the Almshouse, which today is used for high school students in the social sciences.

== Famous alumni ==
- Alesso
- Antonia Ax:son Johnson
- Anton Abele
- Karin Larsson
- Viveca Lindfors
- Kjerstin Dellert
- Claire Wikholm
- Ebba Witt-Brattström
- Princess Margaretha, Mrs. Ambler
- Princess Birgitta of Sweden
- Princess Désirée, Baroness Silfverschiöld
- Princess Christina, Mrs. Magnuson
- Märta Dorff
- Anita Björk
- Jack Solito
- Greta Thunberg
