= Sofie & Cecilia =

2018 novel by Katherine Ashenburg

First edition (publ. Knopf Canada)

Sofie & Cecilia is a historical novel by Canadian author Katherine Ashenburg. The novel drew attention for being Ashenburg's fiction debut published when she was 72. She was inspired to write the book after a visit to Sweden where she learned that despite the fact that they had the same artistic training, Swedish artist Carl Larsson refused to allow his wife Karin to paint after they were married. She initially reached out to her friend, writer Jane Urquhart, hoping she would write about the Larssons, but Urquhart instead encouraged Ashenburg to write a novel about them herself.

A work of fiction, the titular characters are loosely based on Karin Larsson wife of Swedish artist Carl Larsson and Emma Lamm, wife of Swedish artist Anders Zorn.

The novel follows the lives of the two titular characters, Sofie Olsson (based on Karin Larsson) and Cecilia Vogt (based on Emma Lamm), Swedish women who are both married to artists, who meet in their 30s and develop a lifelong friendship.

== Plot ==
In 1901 Sofie Olsson and her husband Nils, along with their children, travel to visit Lars Vogt and his wife Cecilia. Though Nils and Lars are artist colleagues and friends, Sofie and Cecilia barely know each other. Sofie admires Cecilia, but comes to believe that Cecilia does not want her friendship.

=== Sofie ===
Sofie is born Sofie Falkner and in 1882 leaves her village to attend the Royal Swedish Academy of Fine Arts. Like the other female students she is segregated from the male students and is not allowed to draw nudes. Sofie and the other female students settle on drawing scenes drawn from their domestic life and while Sofie does not distinguish herself at school she continues to paint. Post-graduation Sofie meets Nils Olsson and while studying in France the two fall in love and marry. Nils has regressive and sexist attitudes towards women painters which Sofie ignores, eventually accepting that she needs to give up drawing and painting once she marries Nils. She settles into domestic life and mostly defers to Nils, channelling her creativity into raising their children and decorating their home. The Olsson home becomes famous for being an example of Swedish craftsmanship and after Sophia Magdalena of Denmark visits her home, Sofie renews her friendship with Cecilia.

Sofie's artwork, particularly her weaving, attracts attention. Cecilia suggests she market her designs, and a Scottish artist of the applied arts, MacDonald Lawrie, is interested in exhibiting her work. Sofie declines. She becomes increasingly dissatisfied with her marriage as she hears rumours that Nils has fathered children with other women and she continues to grieve the loss of her painting. Sofie and Mr. Lawrie keep up their friendship and Lawrie tells her he loves her; Sofie rebuffs him.

In 1915 Sofie's eldest son, Markus, dies after an operation. The only time Sofie drew during her marriage was when she had postpartum depression after Markus was born. When he is dead she draws him as she remembers him. Through Markus's death she meets Dora Helmersen, a photographer who photographs the dead. As Markus was interested in photography prior to his death Sofie tries to learn a little about photography through Dora, eventually seeing the experimental work she has done. Though Sofie does not always admire Dora's work she does realize she is an artist.

=== Cecilia ===
Cecilia is born into a wealthy Jewish family of textile manufacturers. She meets Lars Vogt when he is painting a portrait of her nephew. When they wish to become engaged she is surprised that her family is not upset by his Christianity but because he is poor. Lars and Cecilia agree to a secret engagement until Lars can establish himself as an artist; he does so in four years and the couple marry and move to France. While there Cecilia assumes they are happy, but is shocked when she discovers a condom despite the fact that the couple are trying to conceive. Lars admits to having an affair and Cecilia forgives him.

By 1899 Lars has become so successful the Vogts decide to move back to Sweden. Cecilia has grown accustomed to Lars's affairs, but still hopes that they will be able to have children. She becomes pregnant but has a miscarriage.

Lars grows more successful, going to America where he makes enough money that the Vogts become rich. They become patrons of the village where Lars was brought up, supporting the orphanage and a school teaching adult literacy and craftsmanship. Cecilia tolerates Lars's affairs with models, but when he sleeps with one of her maids she is furious.

Cecilia and Lars decide to turn their home into a museum after their deaths and hire a recent university graduate, Lisbeth Gregorius, to help them undertake the project. Cecilia is charmed by her as she is completely indifferent to Lars's attempts to seduce her. The two grow friendly and in 1916 they begin an affair.

=== Red ===
In 1924 Nils dies shortly after completing his memoirs. Sofie's children try to block publication due to several unsavoury themes, but to their surprise Sofie does not want the book censored and is only angered by the book because it makes no mention of the fact that she was a painter and that she was responsible for the design work in their house. She privately returns to painting.

Lars falls out of critical favour as a painter though he remains financially successful. In 1931 he suffers from a stroke and Cecilia is told he will die quickly. Contrary to the doctor's opinion Lars clings to life though now he is wholly dependent on Cecilia and the servants.

By 1933 Cecilia is growing concerned with the rise in anti-semitism while Lisbeth, who is still her lover, is unconcerned and thinks she is being too reactionary. At a local festival presented by Cecilia, Sofie accidentally sees them almost kissing and begins to suspect what members of her family have been aware of for some time: Cecilia and Lisbeth are lovers.

In 1934 MacDonald Lawrie returns to Askebo, Sofie's village, and proposes marriage. Sofie accepts but realizes she does not want to live in Scotland and breaks the engagement. As the years go by Sofie and Cecilia draw closer together, talking about their marriage problems and their passion for their work.

Sofie shows her paintings to her family and to Cecilia, who suggests that she move from the watercolours that were Nils's domain into oil paints. Sofie takes up her suggestion and shortly after receives a call from Lisbeth who informs her that Cecilia has died after an illness which she kept hidden.

Sofie attends Cecilia's funeral where she is buried in a churchyard after her family gives her a private Jewish ceremony. Returning home Sofie returns to painting.

== Reception ==
The novel received mixed reviews. Quill & Quire criticized the novel for being "consistently flat, conveying no heights of either personal or artistic passion."
