= Grete Ring =

- Born: Margarete Ottilie Ida Ring; January 5, 1887
- Died: August 18, 1952 (aged 65)
- Education: Ludwig-Maximilians-Universität München
- Occupations: Art historian, collector and dealer
- Relatives: Max Liebermann (uncle)

Margarete Ottilie Ida Ring (5 January 1887 – 18 August 1952) was a dealer, collector and historian of 19th-century paintings and drawings in Germany. She was a partner in the Cassirer Gallery, and was instrumental in uncovering Otto Wacker's Van Gogh forgeries.

Ring was born on 5 January 1887 in Berlin to Margarete (née Marckwald) and Victor Ring. Her father was a senior official in the Kammergericht and her mother was the sister-in-law to Max Liebermann. She was of Jewish descent.

In 1906, she enrolled at the Friedrich Wilhelm University of Berlin, and went on to study with Heinrich Wölfflin at the Ludwig-Maximilians-Universität München, completing a thesis on early Netherlandish portrait painting and earning her doctorate in 1913. She became interested in 19th-century drawings while working at the Alte Pinakothek in Munich and the Nationalgalerie in Berlin.

Ring began working for the firm of Paul Cassirer in 1919, and became a partner in 1924. Following Cassirer's death by suicide in 1926, Ring and Walter Feilchenfeldt took over responsibility for the Berlin gallery, while Helmuth Lutjens managed the Amsterdam branch; Max Jakob Friedländer described her as the gallery's art historian. She became well known for her exposure of art dealer Otto Wacker's forgeries of Vincent van Gogh, which she and Feilchenfeldt discovered while organizing an exhibit of Van Gogh's artwork in 1928.

In 1938, Ring emigrated to London where she re-established the Paul Cassirer Gallery in St James's. The gallery on Cleveland Row was badly damaged by bombing in 1941.

In her book, A Century of French Painting: 1400–1500, Ring argued that French painting of the period should be studied for its own merits, rather than in light of the accomplishments of the Italian Renaissance. She collected drawings by the Lukasbrüder, Max Liebermann, Caspar David Friedrich, Anselm Feuerbach, and Adolph Menzel, which she bequeathed to the Ashmolean Museum in Oxford.
