= Sacré Blues =

2000 non-fiction book by Taras Grescoe

Sacré Blues: An Unsentimental Journey Through Quebec
- First edition cover of Canadian release
- Author: Taras Grescoe
- Subject: Quebec
- Genre: Non-fiction, book
- Publisher: Macfarlane Walter & Ross
- Publication date: 2000
- Publication place: Canada
- Media type: Print (Hardcover & Paperback)
- Pages: 328 pp.
- ISBN: 9781551990811

Sacré Blues: An Unsentimental Journey Through Quebec is a non-fiction book, written by Canadian writer Taras Grescoe, first published in 2000 by Macfarlane Walter & Ross. In the book, the author narrates his candid recollections of moving to Quebec in 1996. In describing "the rituals, eccentricities and customs of his new home", Kathryn Wardropper, award administrator for the Edna Staebler Award said, "It may infuriate some, but it is a landmark book that portrays the challenges and opportunities for modern Quebec."

== Awards ==
Awards for Sacré Blues
Year	Result	Ref.
2000	Hilary Weston Writers' Trust Prize for Nonfiction	Shortlist
2000	Mavis Gallant Prize for Non-Fiction	Winner
2000	McAuslan First Book Prize	Winner
2001	Edna Staebler Award for Creative Non-Fiction	Winner

== See also ==
- List of Edna Staebler Award recipients
