= Jenny Heijun Wills =

Korean Canadian writer and academic

Jenny Heijun Wills (born 1981) is a Korean Canadian writer and academic, whose memoir Older Sister. Not Necessarily Related (McClelland & Stewart) won the Hilary Weston Writers' Trust Prize for Nonfiction in 2019. The book also won a Manitoba Book Award in 2020 for Best First Book. It was a finalist for two other book prizes.

Born in South Korea, she was adopted by a Canadian family in infancy and was raised in Southern Ontario.

== Work ==
Jenny Heijun Wills
- Born: South Korea
- Occupations: Author, Scholar
- Writing career
- Notable works: Everything and Nothing At All: Essays Older Sister. Not Necessarily Related. A Memoir.
- Notable awards: Hilary Weston Writers' Trust Nonfiction Prize Manitoba Book Awards

Wills' memoir is about her experience meeting her birth family for the first time as an adult. The book is written in fragmentary vignettes. Prior to writing the book, Wills lived in Korea while she was a student (2009). The book is set in Seoul, South Korea, Montreal, Quebec, and Winnipeg, Manitoba. It also captures her childhood in Kitchener, Ontario.

Wills co-edited an anthology of academic essays entitled Adoption and Multiculturalism: Europe, the Americas and the Pacific, published by the University of Michigan Press in 2020. In 2022, she also co-edited a collection of essays, Teaching Asian North American Texts, as part of the Options for Teaching series published by the Modern Language Association. Her writing focuses on issues of race, adoption, and gender as they relate to Asian Americans and Asian Canadians.

She is a professor of English at the University of Winnipeg where she is a Chancellor's Research Chair. Wills holds a PhD and MA in English literature from Wilfrid Laurier University. She has an undergraduate degree in English from University of Waterloo and an undergraduate degree in Journalism.

Her book Everything and Nothing At All was a finalist for the 2024 Hilary Weston Writers' Trust Prize.

== Bibliography ==
- Older Sister. Not Necessarily Related (2019)
- Adoption and Multiculturalism: Europe, the Americas and the Pacific (co-editor) (2020)
- Teaching Asian North American Texts (co-editor) (2022)
- Everything and Nothing at All (2024)
