= Marianne Breslauer =

German photographer (1909–2001)

- Born: 20 November 1909; Berlin, German Empire
- Died: 7 February 2001 (aged 91); Zurich, Switzerland
- Other name: Marianne Feilchenfeldt
- Spouse: Walter Feilchenfeldt (m. 1936; died 1953)
- Children: Walter Feilchenfeldt Jr. Konrad Feilchenfeldt
- Awards: Exposition internationale de la photographie contemporaine, Musée des Arts Décoratifs, Paris, 1936

Marianne Breslauer (married name Feilchenfeldt; 20 November 1909 – 7 February 2001) was a German photographer, photojournalist and pioneer of street photography during the Weimar Republic.

== Life ==
Marianne was born in Berlin, the daughter of the architect Alfred Breslauer (1866–1954) and Dorothea Lessing (the daughter of art historian Julius Lessing). She took lessons in photography at Lette-Verein in Berlin from 1927 to 1929, and she admired the work of the then well-known portrait photographer Frieda Riess and later of the Hungarian André Kertész.

In 1929, she travelled to Paris, where she briefly became a pupil of Man Ray, whom she met through Helen Hessel, a fashion correspondent for the Frankfurter Zeitung and family friend. Man Ray encouraged Breslauer to "go her own way without his help". A year later, she started work for the Ullstein photographic studio in Berlin, headed up by Elsbeth Heddenhausen, where she mastered the skills of developing photographs in the darkroom. Until 1934, her photographs were published in many leading magazines such as the Frankfurter Illustrierten, Der Querschnitt, Die Dame, Zürcher Illustrierten, Der Uhu and Das Magazin.

In the early 1930s, Breslauer traveled to Palestine and Alexandria, before traveling with her close friend, the Swiss writer, journalist, and photographer Annemarie Schwarzenbach, whom she met through Ruth Landshoff and whom she photographed many times. She described Schwarzenbach as: "Neither a woman nor a man, but an angel, an archangel." In 1933, they travelled together to the Pyrenees to carry out a photographic assignment for the Berlin photographic agency Academia. This led to Marianne's confrontation with the antisemitic practices then coming into play in Germany. Her employers wanted her to publish her photographs under a pseudonym, to hide the fact that she was Jewish. She refused to do so and left Germany. However, her photograph Schoolgirls won the "Picture of the Year" award at the Salon international d'art photographique in Paris in 1934.

She emigrated in 1936 to Amsterdam where she married the art dealer Walter Feilchenfeldt; he had previously left Germany after seeing Nazis break up an auction of modern art. Her first child, Walter, was born here. Family life and work as an art dealer hindered her work in photography, which she gave up to concentrate on her other activities. In 1939, the family fled to Zurich where her second son, Konrad, was born.

After World War II, in 1948, the couple set up an art business specialising in French paintings and 19th-century art. When her husband died in 1953 she took over the business, which she ran with her son Walter from 1966 to 1990. She died in Zollikon, near Zurich.

== Work ==
Breslauer's work demonstrates an interest in overlooked or marginalised subjects. Her earlier work in Paris, encouraged by the surrealist photographer Man Ray, focused on the homeless along the river Seine.

Her portraits show influence from the photographic experiments of Bauhaus students and the contemporary style Neues Sehen. Nonetheless, her photography conveys a strong personal interest in and approach to capturing dynamic motion, conveyed partially through her selection of bustling urban settings.

Breslauer ended work in her photographic career in 1936 due to the rise of Nazism.

In 1999, Breslauer was awarded the Hannah Höch Prize for her life's work.

== Bibliography ==
- Feilchenfeldt Breslauer, Marianne (2009) [2001]. Bilder meines Lebens: Erinnerungen (in German). Wädenswil: Nimbus. ISBN 978-3-907142-03-5.
- Soupault, Ré; Bing, llse; Breslauer, Marianne (2002). "Ein Fest für die Augen – Der Mythos Paris". In Hörner, Unda (ed.). Madame Man Ray: Fotografinnen der Avantgarde in Paris (in German). Berlin: Edition Ebersbach. pp. 83–114. ISBN 3-934703-36-4.
- Dick, Jutta; Sassenberg, Marina (1993). Jüdische Frauen im 19. und 20. Jahrhundert (in German). Reinbek: Rowohlt. ISBN 3-499-16344-6.
