= A Geography of Blood =

2012 book by Candace Savage

A Geography of Blood: Unearthing Memory from a Prairie Landscape
- First edition
- Author: Candace Savage
- Language: English
- Genre: Non-fiction; natural history
- Published: 2012
- Publisher: Greystone Books / David Suzuki Foundation
- Publication place: Canada
- Pages: 224
- Awards: Hilary Weston Writers' Trust Prize for Nonfiction
- ISBN: 978-1-55365-234-2

A Geography of Blood: Unearthing Memory from a Prairie Landscape is a 2012 book by Canadian author Candace Savage. The book combines natural and human history to reconstruct the past of Southwest Saskatchewan, and in particular the settlement of the region by Canadians, which relied on the forceful removal of the region's Indigenous peoples. Savage explores the colonial history of the area, including the slaughter of the Plains bison, which was an integral part of Indigenous prairie life. The author was inspired initially by a stay in the town of Eastend at the childhood home of American author Wallace Stegner, who also wrote about the region in his autobiography Wolf Willow.

== Awards ==
A Geography of Blood was awarded the 2012 Hilary Weston Writers' Trust Prize for Nonfiction. The book also won three separate Saskatchewan Book Awards, including the Non-Fiction Award and the Book of the Year Award.
