= Charles Montgomery (writer) =

Canadian writer and urbanist

- Born: 1968 (age 57–58); North Vancouver, British Columbia
- Occupations: writer, photojournalist, urbanist
- Writing career
- Period: 2000s–present
- Notable works: The Last Heathen, Happy City
- Website: www.charlesmontgomery.ca

Charles Montgomery (born 1968 in North Vancouver, British Columbia) is a Canadian writer and urbanist. Primarily known for his books The Last Heathen (2004) and Happy City (2013), Montgomery has advised and lectured planners, students, and decision-makers across Canada, the US and England. Using insights from psychology, behavioral economics, architecture and city planning, Montgomery has worked with the BMW Guggenheim Lab and the Museum of Vancouver on social experiments that help citizens transform their relationships with each other and their cities.

Montgomery graduated from the University of Victoria in 1991 with a degree in geography.

Montgomery's writing has appeared in magazines and newspapers including dwell Magazine, Outside Magazine, Canadian Geographic, enRoute magazine, the National Post, The Globe and Mail, The Walrus, Reader's Digest and The South China Morning Post. His magazine writing has won four Western Canada Magazine Awards, a 2004 silver National Magazine award and the 2003 American Society of Travel Writers' Lowell Thomas Silver Award for best North American travel story. In 2007 the Canadian Meteorological and Oceanographic Society awarded him a Citation of Merit for his outstanding contribution towards public awareness of climate change science.

His first book, The Last Heathen (2004), later republished in the United States as The Shark God, is a narrative description of Montgomery's search for the legacy of Victorian missionaries, among them his great-grandfather bishop Henry Montgomery, in the South Pacific archipelago of Melanesia. It includes encounters with cargo cults, pagan ancestor-worshippers and militants in Vanuatu and the Solomon Islands. The book won the Charles Taylor Prize for Literary Non-Fiction in 2005. Prize jurors called it "an irresistible adventure in discovery, a journey into rough terrain and a revelation of the power of ancestral stories across cultural divides." The book also won the Hubert Evans Non-Fiction Prize and was shortlisted for the Writers' Trust of Canada Prize for Non-Fiction.

Happy City (2013) examines the intersection between urban design and the emerging science of happiness. Incorporating recent findings from the fields of psychology, neuroscience, urban planning, and social experimentation, the book makes the case that by retrofitting our cities for happiness we can tackle the urgent challenges of a rapidly urbanizing and environmentally challenged world. "Green space in cities shouldn't be considered an optional luxury," Montgomery writes. "It is a crucial part of a healthy human habitat." The book was a shortlisted nominee for the 2014 Hilary Weston Writers' Trust Prize for Nonfiction.

== Bibliography ==
- The Last Heathen, 2004 (U.S. title: The Shark God), 2006
- Happy City: Transforming Our Lives Through Urban Design, 2013
