= Tanya Talaga =

Canadian journalist and author

- Citizenship: Anishinaabe, Canadian
- Education: University of Toronto
- Occupations: Journalist; Author
- Notable work: Seven Fallen Feathers: Racism, Death, and Hard Truths in a Northern City; All Our Relations: Finding the Path Forward

Tanya Talaga (born 1970) is a Canadian journalist and author of Anishinaabe and Polish descent. She worked as a journalist at the Toronto Star for over twenty years, covering health, education, local issues, and investigations. She is the owner of the media company Makwa Creative. She is a regular columnist with The Globe and Mail. Her 2017 book Seven Fallen Feathers: Racism, Death, and Hard Truths in a Northern City was met with acclaim, winning the 2018 RBC Taylor Prize for non-fiction and the 2017 Shaughnessy Cohen Prize for Political Writing. In 2024 she published The Knowing, a retelling of Canadian History and residential schools through an Indigenous lens, beginning with the life of her great-great grandmother Annie Carpenter. Talaga is the first woman of Anishinaabe descent to be named a CBC Massey Lecturer. She holds honorary doctorates from Lakehead University and from Toronto Metropolitan University.

== Early life and education ==
Talaga is of mixed heritage, describing her ancestry as being one-fourth Ojibwe (Anishinaabe) and half Polish. Her maternal grandmother is a member of Fort William First Nation and her great-grandmother, Liz Gauthier, was a residential school survivor. She was raised in Toronto and spent summers with her mother's family in Raith, Ontario, a small community one hour northwest of Thunder Bay. When she was twenty years old, she learned that a sister had been given up for adoption and that three of her mother's siblings had also grown up in the foster care system. She notes that these experiences influenced her later work on the impacts of residential schools and intergenerational trauma.

Talaga studied history and political science at the University of Toronto. She wrote and edited the university's student newspaper The Varsity and volunteered on The Strand, a publication of Victoria College.

== Career ==
Talaga was hired by the Toronto Star in 1995 as an intern. She worked as a general city reporter for 14 years, covering several beats, before transferring in 2009 to the Queen's Park Bureau. She also wrote as the Indigenous issues columnist.

Her first book, Seven Fallen Feathers: Racism, Death, and Hard Truths in a Northern City, was released in 2017 to critical acclaim and shortlisted for numerous awards in both 2017 and 2018. The book examines the deaths of seven First Nations youths in Thunder Bay, Ontario, and began when Talaga was assigned to write a story about why more First Nations people were not voting in the 2011 federal election, only to find that many people were reluctant to cooperate with her story because the deaths were not its focus.

Talaga delivered the 2018 Massey Lectures, entitled All Our Relations: Finding the Path Forward. Based on her 2018 Massey Lectures, Talaga released her second book, All Our Relations: Finding the Path Forward, which shares the name with the lecture series. In 2020, it was one of five books shortlisted for the British Academy's Nayef Al-Rodhan Prize for Global Cultural Understanding.

Talaga's first podcast, the seven episode Seven Truths, which tells contemporary stories through the lens of the Anishinaabe Seven Grandfather Teachings, was released by Audible on November 26, 2020.

Talaga also owns the production company Makwa Creative Inc. Her documentary film Spirit to Soar premiered at the 2021 Hot Docs Canadian International Documentary Festival, where it won the Audience Award in the mid-length film category.

She was a producer and co-writer of Shane Belcourt's 2025 documentary film Ni-Naadamaadiz: Red Power Rising.

== Awards ==
=== Book awards ===
Awards for Seven Fallen Feathers: Racism, Death and Hard Truths in a Northern City:

- RBC Taylor Prize (2018)
- Shaughnessy Cohen Prize (2018)
- Periodical Marketers of Canada, Indigenous Literature Award (2018)
- Finalist, B.C. National Award for Canadian Non-Fiction (2018)
- Nominee, Hilary Weston Writers' Trust Prize for Nonfiction (2018)
- Finalist, Speaker's Book Award (2017)

=== Fellowships ===
- Atkinson Fellowship in Public Policy (2017–2018)

=== Journalism awards ===
- National Newspaper Award for the Gone Series (2015)
- National Newspaper Award, yearlong project on the Rana Plaza building collapse. (2013)
- Michener Award in public service journalism, five-time nominee.
