= Ken Haigh =

Canadian librarian and writer (born 1962)

- Born: 1962 (age 63–64)
- Occupations: Librarian; writer

Ken Haigh (born 1962) is a Canadian librarian and writer. His 2021 book On Foot to Canterbury, was shortlisted for the 2021 Hilary Weston Writers' Trust Prize for Nonfiction.

Haigh has worked primarily as a librarian, most recently as CEO of the Collingwood Public Library in Collingwood, Ontario until early 2021. He published his first book Under the Holy Lake, a memoir of two years that he spent living in Bhutan in his youth, in 2008. On Foot to Canterbury, a memoir of his trip to England to partake in a traditional medieval pilgrimage from Winchester to Canterbury Cathedral, was published in 2021.
