= John Bentley Mays =

Canadian journalist and writer

- Born: June 22, 1941; Louisiana
- Died: September 16, 2016 (aged 75); Toronto, Ontario
- Occupations: novelist, memoir, art critic
- Spouse: Margaret Cannon
- Writing career
- Period: 1970s–2010s
- Notable works: In the Jaws of the Black Dogs, Power in the Blood

John Bentley Mays (June 22, 1941 – September 16, 2016) was a Canadian journalist and writer. Best known as an art and architecture columnist for The Globe and Mail, he also published a novel and several non-fiction books.

Mays was born in rural Louisiana in 1941. Both his parents died when he was a child, his father in a car accident and his mother of cancer, and he was raised thereafter by relatives in Shreveport. He studied medieval literature and literary criticism at the University of Rochester, and moved to Toronto in 1969 to accept a teaching job at York University. He married Margaret Cannon in 1971, and published his first novel, The Spiral Stair, in 1978. He joined The Globe and Mail in 1980.

In 1994 he published Emerald City: Toronto Visited, a collection of essays about Toronto architecture and history. The following year he published In the Jaws of the Black Dogs, a memoir of his lifelong struggle with clinical depression. In the book, he came out as bisexual by orientation, although he noted that for personal and religious reasons he had chosen to remain monogamously married to his wife rather than exploring his attractions to men.

In 1997 he published Power in the Blood, a memoir about exploring his family history after the death of his aunt Vandalia in 1990. The book was shortlisted for that year's Viacom Writers' Trust Prize for Nonfiction. The following year he left The Globe and Mail to become a general arts and culture journalist for the National Post, remaining with that paper until 2001.

In 2002 he published Arrivals: Stories from the History of Ontario, a book about Ontario history. The book won the Joseph Brant Award from the Ontario Historical Society. He was a freelance writer for a variety of publications in this era, until rejoining The Globe and Mail in 2008 as an architecture columnist. Over the course of his career in journalism, he won awards from both the National Newspaper Awards and the National Magazine Awards. He also taught courses and gave guest lectures on architecture at OCAD University and the University of Toronto.

Mays died of a heart attack on September 16, 2016, in Toronto, just two weeks after completing his second novel, The Occidental Hotel.

== Books ==
- The Spiral Stair (1978)
- Emerald City: Toronto Visited (1994)
- In the Jaws of the Black Dogs: A Memoir of Depression (1995)
- Power in the Blood: Land, Memory and a Southern Family (1997)
- Arrivals: Stories from the History of Ontario (2002)
- The Occidental Hotel (2020) [published posthumously]
