= Candace Savage =

Canadian non-fiction writer (born 1949)

Candace Sherk Savage FRSC (born December 2, 1949) is a Canadian non-fiction writer.

== Early life ==
Candace Sherk was born in Grande Prairie, Alberta, Canada on December 2, 1949. Both of her grandmothers were born in the United States and married Canadian men. As her father was a school administrator, she moved throughout Alberta during her childhood.

== Career ==
Savage began her journalism career as a news editor of Sun Color Press and later became an editorial assistant for Co-Operative Consumer. In the 1970s, Savage became a free-lance book editor with The Western Producer in Saskatoon, which piqued her interest in authoring books. In the 1970s, Savage moved to Saskatoon with her husband Arthur Savage. In 1977, she began to construct a biography on Nellie McClung. After her husband died, Savage moved to Edmonton and Yellowknife before returning to Saskatoon with her daughter. From 1984 until 1986, she was the coordinator of information and education at the Science Institute of the Northwest Territories in Yellowknife, Northwest Territories, Canada.

In the 1990s, she received the Bill Duthie Booksellers' Choice Award for her book "Bird Brains," and the Science in Society Book Award from the Canadian Science Writers' Association for her book "Aurora and Bird Brains." In 2002, her book "Wizards" won the 2002 Saskatchewan Book Award.

In 2010, Savage was elected a Fellow of the Royal Society of Canada. Two years later, Savage wrote a A Geography of Blood: Unearthing Memory from a Prairie Landscape, which she called a personal memoir of her growing interest in the natural and human history of southwestern Saskatchewan. The book won the 2012 Hilary Weston Writers' Trust Prize for Nonfiction. In 2019, while renovating her 1920s-era bungalow in Saskatoon, she discovered paraphernalia belonging to Ralph Blondin. This led her to research how Blondin's family, a Métis French-speaking family, dealt with White Supremacy and assimilated to survive. She eventually published her discoveries in a book titled "Strangers in the House."

In 2022, she was awarded the Matt Cohen Award by the Writers' Trust of Canada.

== Selected works ==
- Our Nell (1979)
- Wild Mammals of Western Canada (1981) (with Arthur Savage)
- Wonder of Canadian Birds (1985)
- Pelicans (1986)
- Eagles of North America (1987)
- Wolves (1988)
- Grizzly Bears (1990)
- Trash Attack! (1990)
- Get Growing! (1991)
- Peregrine Falcons (1992)
- Eat Up! (1992)
- Wild Cats (1993)
- Aurora: The Mysterious Northern Lights (1994)
- Bird Brains: The Intelligence of Crows, Ravens, Magpies and Jays (1995)
- Cowgirls (1996)
- The Nature of Wolves: An Intimate Portrait (1996)
- Mother Nature: Animal Parents and their Young (1997)
- Beauty Queens: A Playful History (1998)
- Witch: The Wild Ride from Wicked to Wicca (2000)
- Prairie: A Natural History (2004)
- Curious by Nature (2005)
- Crows: Encounters with the Wise Guys of the Avian World (2005)
- Bees: Nature's little wonders (2008)
- A Geography of Blood: Unearthing Memory from a Prairie Landscape (2012)
- Strangers in the House: a Prairie Story of Bigotry and Belonging (2019)
