= Modris Eksteins =

Latvian Canadian historian

- Modris Ekšteins
- Born: December 13, 1943 (age 82); Riga
- Occupation: Historian
- Awards: Wallace K. Ferguson Prize; Trillium Book Award, Pearson Writers' Trust Non-Fiction Prize; British Columbia National Award for Canadian Non-Fiction

Academic background
- Education: University of Toronto (BA, 1965), Heidelberg University; Oxford University (

Academic work
- Discipline: History
- Sub-discipline: German history, modern culture, World War I, World War II
- Institutions: University of Toronto Scarborough
- Main interests: German history, modern culture, European history

Modris Eksteins (Latvian: Modris Ekšteins; born December 13, 1943) is a Latvian Canadian historian with a special interest in German history and modern culture.

Born in Riga, Latvia, his works include Rites of Spring: The Great War and the Birth of the Modern Age (1989), which won the Wallace K. Ferguson Prize and the Trillium Book Award. Walking Since Daybreak: A Story of Eastern Europe, World War II and the Heart of Our Century (1999), which juxtaposes the history of World War II and Latvia with personal memoir, and won the Pearson Writers' Trust Non-Fiction Prize, and Solar Dance: Genius, Forgery, and the Eclipse of Certainty (2012), which seeks to interpret the enormous posthumous success of Vincent van Gogh and discusses his forger Otto Wacker, and won the 2013 British Columbia National Award for Canadian Non-Fiction. His work has been translated into German, French, Dutch, Spanish, Portuguese, Polish, Czech, Latvian, Japanese, Korean, and Chinese.

After emigrating to Canada as a child, Eksteins, son of a Baptist minister, settled first in Winnipeg and then in Toronto, where he attended Upper Canada College on scholarship and then the University of Toronto (Trinity College) from which he graduated with a BA in 1965. Meanwhile, he attained a Diploma from Heidelberg University in 1963. He then studied at Oxford University (St. Antony's College) as a Rhodes Scholar, earning his BPhil in 1967, and DPhil in 1970. He joined the Division of Humanities at University of Toronto Scarborough in 1970, retiring as professor emeritus of history in 2010.

== Works ==
- Theodor Heuss und die Weimarer Republik (1969), Ernst Klett Verlag
- The Limits of Reason: The German Democratic Press and the Collapse of Weimar Democracy (1975), Oxford University Press, ISBN 0-19-821862-1 – URN:oclc:record:1245530577 — Internet Archive
- Nineteenth-Century Germany (1983), Gunter Narr Verlag, ISBN 3-87808-179-0, co-editor
- Rites of Spring: The Great War and the Birth of the Modern Age (1989), Houghton Mifflin, ISBN 978-0-39549-856-9
- Walking Since Daybreak: A Story of Eastern Europe, World War II and the Heart of Our Century (1999), Houghton Mifflin, ISBN 978-0395937471
- Diaghilev Was Here (2005), Diaghilev Festival Foundation, ISBN 907-6704945, co-author
- Solar Dance: Genius, Forgery, and the Eclipse of Certainty (2012), Knopf Canada, ISBN 978-0-30739-859-8
