= Hello I Want to Die Please Fix Me =

2019 memoir by Anna Mehler Paperny

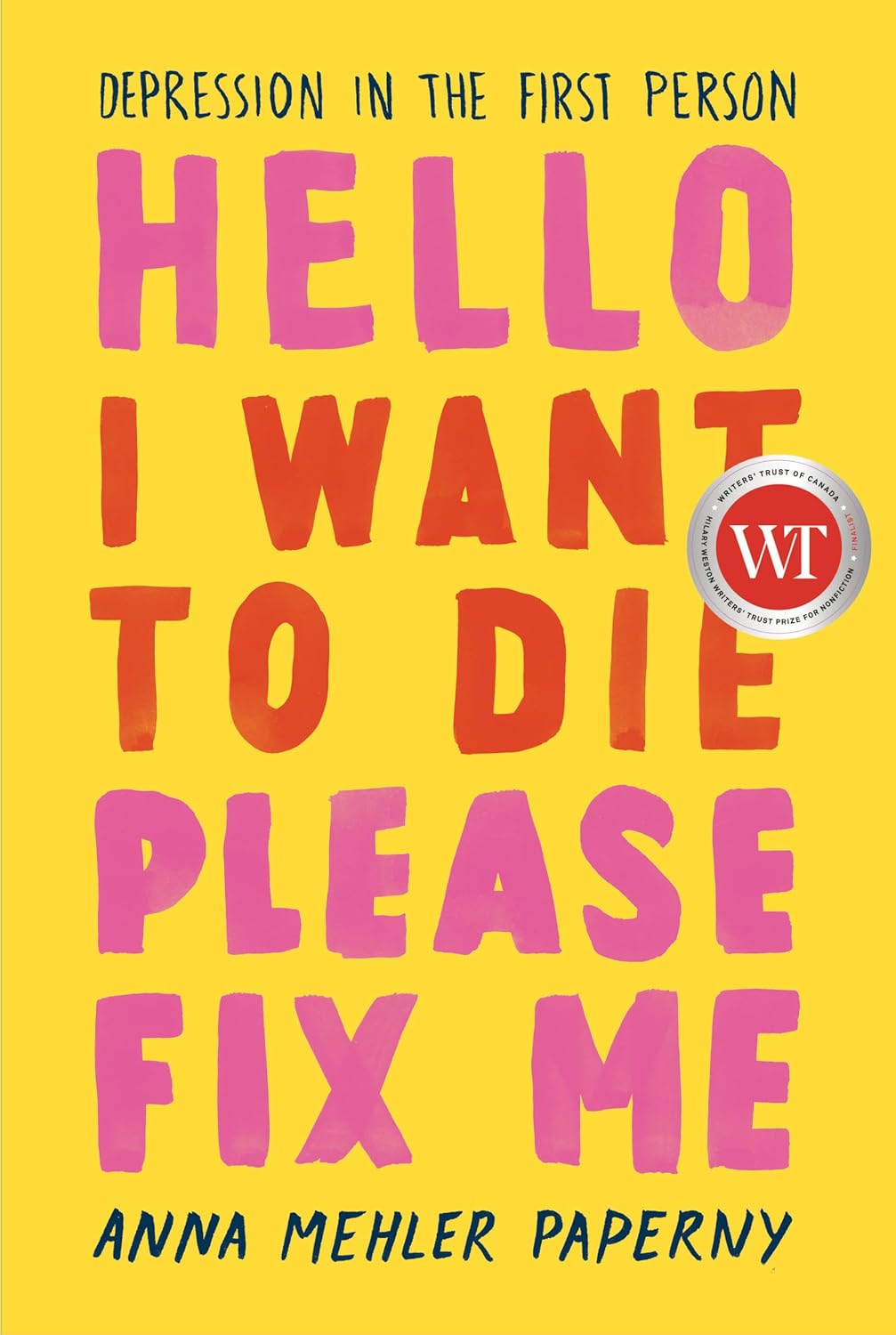
- Author: Anna Mehler Paperny
- Subjects: Clinical depression, suicide
- Genre: Non-fiction
- Publisher: Random House Canada
- Publication date: August 6, 2019
- ISBN: 978-0735272828

Hello I Want to Die Please Fix Me is a 2019 memoir by journalist Anna Mehler Paperny about her experience of major depressive disorder and suicidal ideation. It was nominated for the Hilary Weston Writers' Trust Prize for Nonfiction in 2019.

== Publication ==
Hello I Want to Die Please Fix Me was written by journalist Anna Mehler Paperny. Mehler Paperny has worked for The Globe and Mail, Reuters and Maclean's.

The book was published by Random House Canada, and was Mehler Paperny's first book.

== Synopsis ==
The book starts with Mehler Paperny's first suicide attempt, subsequent hospitalisation and care, and a description of the impact of her actions on her family. It documents her extended involuntary time as a psychiatric inpatient. The book documents other attempts that Mehler Paperny made to end her own life and her experiences of the Canadian healthcare system. Interviews with patients, scientists, activists and healthcare professionals follow.

== Critical reception ==
The book was described by CBC journalist Jane van Koeverden as comprehensive, candid, and straightforward Anne Thériault, writing in Quill & Quire praised the author's ability to clearly explain complex matters and described her writing as compassionate, thorough, and fascinating. KC Hoard, writing in The Charlatan praised the author's wit and intellect and called the book mesmerising. Health journalist André Picard described the book as "raw, frank and dark-humoured."

The book was nominated for the Hilary Weston Writers' Trust Prize for Nonfiction in 2019.
