= Julius Lessing =

German art historian (1843–1908)

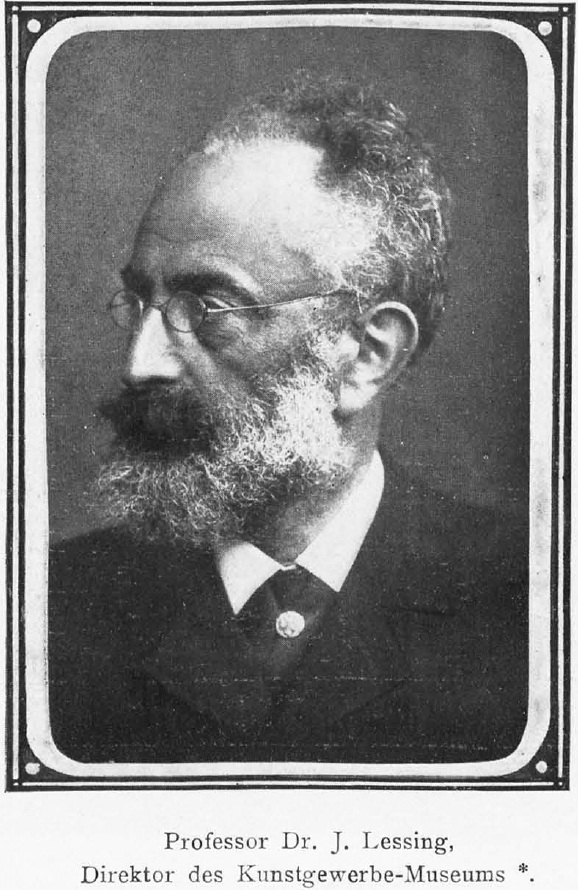
Julius Lessing

Julius Lessing (20 September 1843 – 14 March 1908) was a German art historian and the first director of the Berliner Kunstgewerbemuseum (Museum of Decorative Arts in Berlin).

== Life ==
Lessing attended university in Berlin and Bonn, after which he taught History of Decorative Arts in Berlin. In 1872 he was responsible for a large exhibition of decorative art in Berlin, which featured objects from the royal collection as well as privately held items, under the patronage of Crown Prince Frederick. The success of this exhibition led to the founding of the Museum of Decorative Arts in Berlin, which Lessing led until his death in 1908.

In 1894 he published his Neue Wege (New Ways) article in the journal Kunstgewerbeblatt, praising new materials in architecture.

He was buried in the Jewish Cemetery in Friedhof Schönhauser Allee. He was the grandfather of photographer Marianne Breslauer.

== Selected works ==
- Das Kunstgewerbe auf der Wiener Weltausstellung. E. Wasmuth Berlin 1874
- Altorientalische Teppichmuster: Nach Bildern und Originalen des XV. - XVI. Jahrhunderts, Berlin 1877 (republished: Wasmuth 1926); translated into English as Ancient Oriental Carpet Patterns after Pictures and Originals of the Fifteenth and Sixteenth Centuries. London: H. Sotheran & Co., 1879
- Berichte von der Pariser Weltausstellung 1878. E. Wasmuth Berlin 1878
- Die Silberarbeiten von Antonius Eisenhoit aus Warburg; Lichtdruck von Albert Frisch, Berlin 1879
- Vorbilder-Hefte aus dem Kgl. Kunstgewerbemuseum. Wasmuth, Berlin 1888–1905
