= Walter Feilchenfeldt =

German art dealer and publisher

Walter Feilchenfeldt (born 21 January 1894 in Berlin; died 9 December 1953 in Zürich) was a German art dealer and publisher.

== Life and work ==
Walter Feilchenfeldt was born in Berlin on 21 January 1894, the son of a doctor. In 1919 he began working for the art dealer and publisher Paul Cassirer, becoming a partner in the Cassirer art dealership in 1924. After Cassirer's death, he continued to run the art dealership and the publishing house, together with Greta Ring.

=== Amsterdam and Zürich ===
When the Nazis came to power in 1933, Feilchenfeldt was persecuted due to his Jewish heritage. He left Berlin and went to Amsterdam, where he succeeded Helmuth Lütjens (1893–1986) as director of the Dutch branch of Cassirer and married in 1936 Marianne Breslauer. Their first son Walter Feilchenfedlt Jr was born in 1939.

His business partner Grete Ring dissolved in 1937 the Berlin branch of Cassiser and founded in London a British company, Kunsthandlung Paul Cassirer Limited.

Feilchenfeldt moved to Switzerland with his family and worked as an art dealer lin Ascona and Zürich. His second son, Konrad Feilchenfeldt, was born in 1944. In 1948 he founded the die Kunsthandlung Walter Feilchenfeldt, which he directed until his death in 1953.

The art dealership was then directed by his widow, Marianne Breslauer-Feilchenfeldt, until 1990. She was joined in 1966 by their son Walter Feilchenfeldt Jr who later managed the business until 2011. Feilchenfeldt Jr was also the director of Kunstvermittlung AG in Zürich and the president of the Swiss Art Trading Association from 1997 until 2007.

== Literature ==
- Marianne Feilchenfeldt Breslauer: Bilder meines Lebens – Erinnerungen. Wädenswil, 2009, ISBN 978-3-907142-03-5.
- Feilchenfeld, Walter [sic!], in: Werner Röder, Herbert A. Strauss (Hrsg.): Biographisches Handbuch der deutschsprachigen Emigration nach 1933. Band 1: Politik, Wirtschaft, Öffentliches Leben. Saur, München 1980, S. 168f.
- Feilchenfeldt, Walter. In: Ernst Fischer: Verleger, Buchhändler & Antiquare aus Deutschland und Österreich in der Emigration nach 1933: Ein biographisches Handbuch. Elbingen: Verband Deutscher Antiquare, 2011, S. 67f.
