= Katherine Ashenburg =

Canadian writer

- Occupations: Editor; writer; novelist
- Known for: debuting a novel at 73

Katherine Ashenburg is a Canadian writer best known for her 2018 debut novel Sofie & Cecilia.

== Career ==
Ashenburg began her career as a CBC Radio producer, eventually becoming an editor at The Globe and Mail newspaper.

In 1996 Ashenburg published her first book, Going to Town: Architectural Walking Tours in Southern Ontario. She followed it with two more works of non-fiction: The Mourner's Dance: What We Do When People Die, which she wrote after her son-in-law died in 1998, and The Dirt on Clean: An Unsanitized History.

Ashenberg released her debut novel Sofie & Cecilia a few months shy of her 73rd birthday. The novel was inspired by a trip she took to Sweden to visit her daughter, where she became fascinated by the life of artist Carl Larsson and his wife Karin Larsson. Ashenburg originally told Karin Larsson's story to her friend author Jane Urquhart, hoping that she would turn it into a novel, but Urquhart instead suggested Ashenberg write the story herself.

== Selected works ==
- Going to Town: Architectural Walking Tours in Southern Ontario (1996)
- The Mourner's Dance: What We Do When People Die (2002)
- The Dirt on Clean: An Unsanitized History (2008)
- Sofie & Cecilia (2018)
- Her Turn (2021)
