= The Last Heathen =

2004 book by Charles Montgomery

The Last Heathen: Encounters with Ghosts and Ancestors in Melanesia
- Author: Charles Montgomery
- Language: English
- Genre: Autobiography
- Publisher: Douglas and McIntyre, HarperCollins
- Publication date: 2004
- Publication place: Canada

The Last Heathen: Encounters with Ghosts and Ancestors in Melanesia is a book by Charles Montgomery, published in Canada by Douglas and McIntyre in 2004. In 2006 it was published in the United States by HarperCollins as The Shark God.

The Last Heathen is the autobiographical account of the author in his journey to Melanesia, following in the footsteps of his great-grandfather, Henry Montgomery, Bishop of Tasmania, and to study the effect of his great-grandfather's religion on the people. Montgomery traveled to Melanesia expecting to find a volatile mixture of the tribal, pagan religion and Christianity. He found a comfortable hybrid instead, the two religions living in harmony. The book details his journey as well as his discoveries, from an atheistic point of view.

The book won the Charles Taylor Prize for Literary Non-fiction in 2005. The book has also won the Hubert Evans Non-Fiction Prize.

== Reception ==
Holly Morris reviewed the American edition for The New York Times in 2006: "As both traveler and writer, Montgomery is a thoughtful and entertaining guide, and his story has rich layers of history and anthropology."
