= Seven Fallen Feathers =

2017 nonfiction book by Tanya Talaga

- First edition
- Author: Tanya Talaga
- Publisher: House of Anansi Press
- Publication date: 2017
- Awards: Shaughnessy Cohen Prize for Political Writing, 2017; RBC Taylor Prize, 2018; PMC Indigenous Literature Awards, 2018
- ISBN: 978-1487002268

Seven Fallen Feathers: Racism, Death, and Hard Truths in a Northern City is a nonfiction book by Tanya Talaga, published September 30, 2017 by House of Anansi Press.

The book won the Shaughnessy Cohen Prize for Political Writing in 2017, as well as the RBC Taylor Prize for Literary Nonfiction and PMC Indigenous Literature Awards in 2018.

== Synopsis ==
Seven Fallen Feathers discusses the experiences of Indigenous children at schools in Thunder Bay, Ontario. For various reasons, Indigenous children in Ontario often leave their homes around age 13 or 14 to attend school in a larger city, such as Thunder Bay, where they are likely to " face a myriad of hardships—rampant racism, extreme underage alcohol and substance abuse, along with physical and sexual violence."

Talaga's book investigates "seven untimely and largely unsolved deaths that have taken place among Native Thunder Bay students" between 2000 and 2011, all of which were "immediately deemed accidental, some noted as such by the local police even before a coroner had a chance to conduct an autopsy."

Throughout the investigation into these deaths, Talaga also provides necessary history about Canadian residential schools.

== Critical reception ==
Seven Fallen Feathers was generally well-received, including starred reviews from Booklist and Publishers Weekly.

Courtney Eathorne, writing for Booklist, noted, "Talaga’s incisive research and breathtaking storytelling could bring this community one step closer to the healing it deserves."

Publishers Weekly called Seven Fallen Feathers "a powerful examination and critique of present and past Canadian policies on indigenous peoples." The reviewer noted,

Talaga’s research is meticulous and her journalistic style is crisp and uncompromising. She brings each story to life, skillfully weaving the stories of the youths’ lives, deaths, and families together with sharp analysis. She connects each death to neocolonial policies and institutional racism in all levels of governments, as well as the legacy of Canada’s infamously abusive residential schools. The book is heartbreaking and infuriating, both an important testament to the need for change and a call to action.

Shelf Awareness's Kerry McHugh provided a mixed review, noting that the book "feels imbued with a strange sense of déjà vu, in part because Talaga repeats facts multiple times across as many pages." They continued, stating, "The repetition is what Talaga works hard to warn against: look at what's been done. Remember what has happened. Do not let it happen again."

Awards for Seven Fallen Feathers
Year	Award	Result	Ref.
2017	Shaughnessy Cohen Prize for Political Writing	Winner	
2018	British Columbia National Award for Canadian Non-Fiction	Finalist	
2018	RBC Taylor Prize for Literary Nonfiction	Winner	
2017	Hilary Weston Writers' Trust Prize for Nonfiction	Shortlist	
2018	PMC Indigenous Literature Awards	Winner	
