= National Media Awards Foundation =

The National Media Awards Foundation (NMAF) is a Canadian charity whose mission is to recognize excellence in the content and creation of Canadian magazines and Canadian digital publishing through two annual awards programs: the National Magazine Awards (NMAs) and the Digital Publishing Awards (DPAs).

Both events—The National Magazine Awards gala and the Digital Publishing Awards soirée—take place each June in Toronto. Each year the NMAF relies on over 100 volunteer judges to evaluate the entries and award gold and silver winners in the NMA written, visual, integrated and special categories and in the various DPA categories.

A 20-member board of directors mostly drawn from the Canadian media industry governs the NMAF. As of 2022, the president of the board of directors of the NMAF is Melony Ward, publisher of Canada’s History and Kayak.

== History ==
In 1976 Andrew MacFarlane, Dean of Journalism at the University of Western Ontario (UWO), was trying to revive the university's recently defunct President's Medal for Canadian Magazine Journalism. His original idea was to create a new award divided into English and French counterparts. But MacFarlane eventually developed a proposal for a series of magazine awards, whose salient features were that the program would be bilingual – and therefore truly national – and would recognize individual excellence in the many aspects of the magazine industry – writers, illustrators, editors, photographers and art directors.

MacFarlane together with John S. Crosbie, president of the Magazine Association of Canada, secured the participation of the Canadian Periodical Publishers Association (CPPA), representing 193 Canadian magazines, and CPPA's former president Michael de Pencier. MacFarlane reached out to his counterpart at Université Laval, Roger de la Garde, Alan Edmunds, head of the Periodical Writers Association of Canada (PWAC), and veteran newsman Pierre Berton, among others. As the collective effort began to take shape across the country, by the spring of 1977 the National Magazine Awards had developed a clear mandate.

On 14 November 1977, National Magazine Awards Foundation received its charter of non-profit foundation status from the Government of Ontario.

In 2015, the NMAF established the Digital Publishing Awards, to promote and reward the achievements of those who create digital publishing content in Canada.

The National Magazine Awards celebrated 40 years of awarding Canadian creators in 2017. The 40th anniversary event was co-hosted by Kim Pittaway, Michael de Pencier, and D.B. Scott. Alicia Elliott delivered the keynote address.

AS of 2022, the National Media Awards have been given to journalists, illustrators and photographers for 45 years.

== First awards ==
There were more than 1300 entries to the first National Magazine Awards for the year 1977. 62 judges evaluated the entries and awarded winners in 14 categories. The first National Magazine Awards gala was held on Thursday, 11 May 1978 at the Hotel Toronto.

Pierre Berton emceed the event, where the 660 guests dined and danced to Jack Collins and his five-piece band. Before presenting the awards, Berton proclaimed to the audience, "In a bold departure from tradition, there are to be no thank you speeches. We can do that because we are giving money, not some cheap statuette." If any winner started to talk on stage, Berton reportedly waved a large hook in the speaker's direction.

Awards were handed down in 14 categories (with separate French- and English-language winners for the President's Award for General Magazine Articles). 11 different magazines won awards. The NMAF also honoured outstanding achievement by a magazine: L'actualité (French) and Harrowsmith (English) took the awards.

== Major winners of the National Magazine Awards ==
The now-defunct Saturday Night is the all-time leader in awards, with 129 gold awards. Toronto Life magazine leads all current publications with 108 gold awards. Writer Robert Fulford is the all-time individual leader with 14 gold awards.

The NMAF also maintains a searchable archive of all past winners and tallies of magazines and creators who have won the most National Magazine Awards.

== Categories ==
The NMAF has a total of 29 awards categories, including 10 categories from the Magazine Grands Prix program. There are 4 types of awards categories:

Written Categories & Visual Awards: Long-Form Feature Writing, Feature Writing, Short Feature Writing, Columns, Essays, Investigative Reporting, Fiction, Personal Journalism, Poetry, Professional Article, Profiles, Service Journalism, Best New Magazine Writer, Illustration (incl. Spot & Photo Illustration), Portrait Photography, Lifestyle Photography, Photo Essay & Photojournalism, One of a Kind Storytelling.

Editorial Awards: Best Editorial Package, Art Direction Grand Prix, Editor Grand Prix, Cover Grand Prix.

Grand Prix: Best Magazine Awards: General Interest, Service, Lifestyle, Fashion & Beauty, Art & Literary, Special Interest.

Special Awards: Magazine Grand Prix, Foundation Award for Outstanding Achievement.

== Magazine of the Year ==
Each year the National Magazine Awards concludes with the naming of Canada's Magazine of the Year. Previous winners are:

- 1982: Equinox
- 1983: Vancouver Magazine
- 1984: Saturday Night
- 1985: Toronto Life
- 1986: Quill & Quire
- 1987: Report on Business Magazine
- 1988: Applied Arts Quarterly
- 1989: Toronto Life
- 1990: West Magazine
- 1991: Idler
- 1992: Cottage Life
- 1993: Owl and Chickadee
- 1994: Canadian Art
- 1995: Canadian House & Home
- 1996: Canadian Living
- 1997: Vancouver Magazine
- 1998: Adbusters
- 1999: Chatelaine
- 2000: Azure
- 2001: Canadian Geographic
- 2002: Outpost Magazine
- 2003: Border Crossings
- 2004: Maisonneuve
- 2005: Maclean's
- 2006: The Walrus
- 2007: Toronto Life
- 2008: AlbertaViews
- 2009: Up Here
- 2010: MoneySense
- 2011: Maisonneuve
- 2012: Corporate Knights
- 2013: Cottage Life
- 2014: Nouveau Projet
- 2015: Maisonneuve
- 2016: Cottage Life
- 2017: The Kit Compact
- 2018: The Site Magazine
- 2019: Nouveau Projet
- 2020: L'actualité
- 2021: Toronto Life
- 2022: Inuit Art Quarterly
- 2023: Lez Spread the Word

== Outstanding Achievement ==
Each year since 1990 the NMAF has awarded the Foundation Award for Outstanding Achievement, which recognizes an individual's innovation and creativity through contributions to the Canadian magazine industry. The winners since 1990 are:

- 1990 Prue Hemelrijk
- 1991 Michael de Pencier
- 1992 Lloyd Hodgkinson
- 1993 Barbara Moon
- 1994 Don Obe
- 1995 Jean Paré
- 1996 Catherine Keachie
- 1997 James Ireland
- 1998 Robert Fulford
- 1999 Lynn Cunningham
- 2000 Peter C. Newman
- 2001 Ken Rodmell
- 2002 Al Zikovitz
- 2003 Sally Armstrong
- 2003 Stephen Osborne
- 2004 Paul Jones
- 2005 John Macfarlane
- 2006 Neville Gilfoy
- 2007 Charles Oberdorf
- 2008 Cynthia Brouse
- 2009 Terry Sellwood
- 2010 D.B. Scott
- 2011 Heather Robertson
- 2012 Stephen Trumper
- 2013 Kim Jernigan
- 2014 Michael Fox
- 2015 Kim Pittaway
- 2016 Penny Caldwell
- 2017 Joyce Byrne
- 2018 Linda Spalding
- 2020 Don Gillmor
- 2023 Jennifer Varkonyi & Jean-Paul Gagné

== Other information ==
The submissions process for the National Magazine Awards is generally open from December until the second week of January. Nominations are announced in the spring, and the awards gala is held in June in Toronto.
