= Alexander Sasha Josipovicz =

Alexander (Sasha) Josipovicz (/ˌdʒɒzɪˈpɒvɪts/ JOZ-ip-OV-its) is an internationally recognized interior designer and magazine editor. He is the first honorary editor-in-chief of OBJEKT International USA-CANADA edition, creative contributor to Studio Pyramid. and co-founder of The Element Group, both Toronto-based multidisciplinary design and architectural firms.

Josipovicz was born in Belgrade and is the youngest child of a prominent Serbian dissident. His father, Radoje Josipovic, is acknowledged in Tribute to Liberty, the Canadian government-funded monument honouring victims of communism. Sasha spent time in Nice, France, and New York City before settling in Toronto in 1983. He graduated from The American International Academy of Interior Design in 1987.

Josipovicz has gained international recognition as a designer known for his use of art, colour and classical proportions in modern interiors.

== Work ==
Josipovicz has worked as a designer, consultant, editor and writer across categories and publications which include: The New York Post, Wallpaper, Architectural Record, Domus, Interior Design, Nice Matin, The National Post, The Globe & Mail, Toronto Star, Toronto Life, Canadian Interiors, HGTV, CBC, PETA, Style at Home, House & Home and 507 Antiques.
