= Winston Churchill's address to the Canadian Parliament (1941) =

Winston Churchill's address to the Canadian Parliament of 30 December 1941 was made in Ottawa, shortly after the United States had joined the Allies in World War II (on account of the Pearl Harbor attack). The Canadian Senate was also in attendance. It is sometimes referred to by its most noted passage, "Some chicken! Some neck!"

== Background ==
Winston Churchill had sailed from the United Kingdom to the United States less than a week after the Pearl Harbor attack, leaving London on 12 December 1941 and arriving in United States on 22 December. There he stayed for the next four weeks, mostly conferring with President Roosevelt and forming a strong personal bond as well. On 26 December 1941 he addressed the 77th United States Congress with a speech titled "What kind of a people do they think we are?", which drew thunderous applause from the American lawmakers.

Churchill took a short side trip to Canada, where twenty thousand people filled the streets around Ottawa's Union Station to greet him. Thousands more cheered him as he rode to Rideau Hall.

== Speech ==
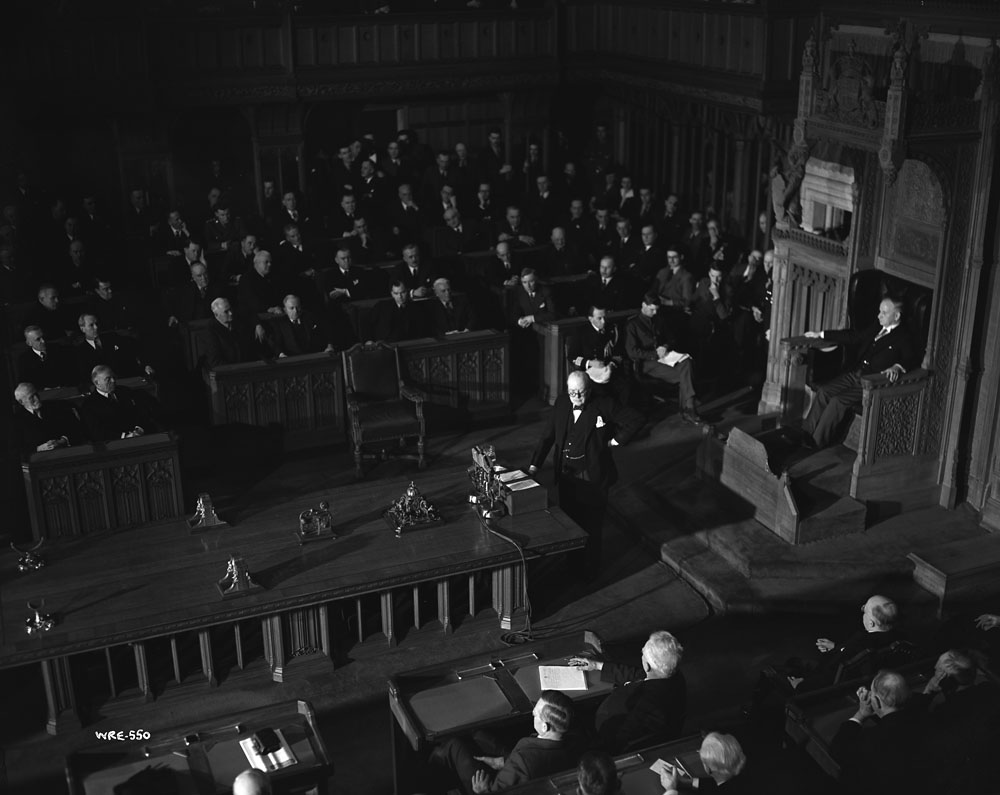
Churchill (center) addressing the Canadian Parliament and Senate, 30 December 1941

Canadian Prime Minister Mackenzie King had suggested that Churchill speak at the Château Laurier, but Churchill preferred the Canadian House of Commons, where he addressed the Canadian Parliament and Senate.

The speech was filmed, and broadcast nationwide, and drew much interest and enthusiasm. The speech lasted for 37 minutes, with much defiant and stirring oratory:

We shall never descend to the German and Japanese level, but if anybody likes to play rough we can play rough too. Hitler and his Nazi gang have sown the wind; let them reap the whirlwind... The enemies ranged against us, coalesced and combined against us, have asked for total war. Let us make sure they get it...

Later came the passage with the famous phrase:

... On top of all this [disasters previously mentioned] came the great French catastrophe. The French Army collapsed, and the French nation was dashed into utter and, as it has proved, irre-- proved so far, irretrievable confusion. The French Government had, at their own suggestion, solemnly bound themselves, with us, not to make a separate peace... But their generals misled them. When I warned them that Britain would fight on alone, whatever they did, their generals told their Prime Minister, and his divided cabinet, in three weeks England would have her neck wrung like a chicken. Some chicken! Some neck!

"Some chicken!" elicited mild laughter from the assembled dignitaries, while "Some neck!" brought forth loud peals of laughter. (The phrase was perhaps a form of asteism; Robert and Susan Cockcroft described it as transforming, rather than rejecting, the original insult, an example of a persuasive rhetorical device they call the similarity model of argument.)

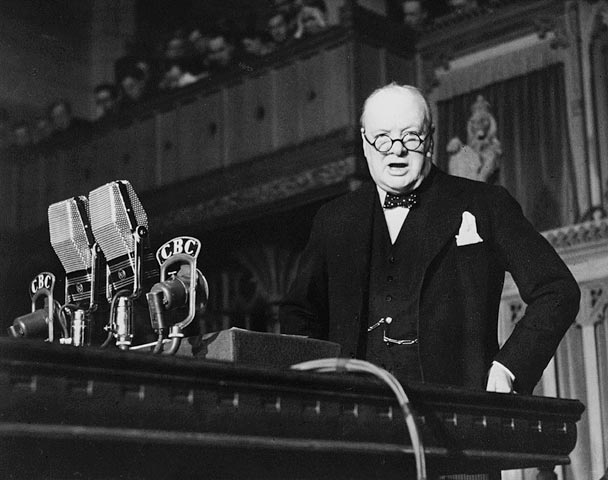
Churchill addressing the Canadian Parliament and Senate, 30 December 1941

Churchill, who spoke French, included a short passage in that language (at the suggestion of Mackenzie King):

Et partout dans la France occupée et inoccupée (car leur sort est égal), ces honnêtes gens, ce grand peuple, la nation française, se redresse. L’espoir se rallume dans les coeurs d’une race guerrière, même désarmée, berceau de la liberté révolutionnaire et terrible aux vainqueurs esclaves. Et partout, on voit le point du jour, et la lumière grandit, rougeâtre, mais claire. Nous ne perdrons jamais la confiance que la France jouera le rôle des hommes libres et qu’elle reprendra par des voies dures sa place dans la grande compagnie des nations libératrices et victorieuses. Ici, au Canada, où la langue française est honorée et parlée, nous nous tenons prêts et armés pour aider et pour saluer cette résurrection nationale.

which translates to

And everywhere in France, occupied and unoccupied - for their fate is identical – these honest folk, this great people, the French nation, are rising again. Hope is springing up again in the hearts of a warrior race, even though disarmed, cradle of revolutionary liberty and terrible to enslaving conquerors. And everywhere dawn is breaking and light spreading, reddish yet, but clear. We shall never lose confidence that France will play the role of free men again and, by hard paths, will once again attain her place in the great company of freedom-bringing and victorious nations. Here in Canada, where the French language is honoured and spoken, we are armed and ready to help and to hail this national resurrection."

Churchill ended the speech with:

Let us then address ourselves to our task, not in any way underrating its tremendous difficulties and perils, but in good heart and sober confidence, resolved that, whatever the cost, whatever the suffering, we shall stand by one another, true and faithful comrades, and do our duty, God helping us, to the end.

== Aftermath ==
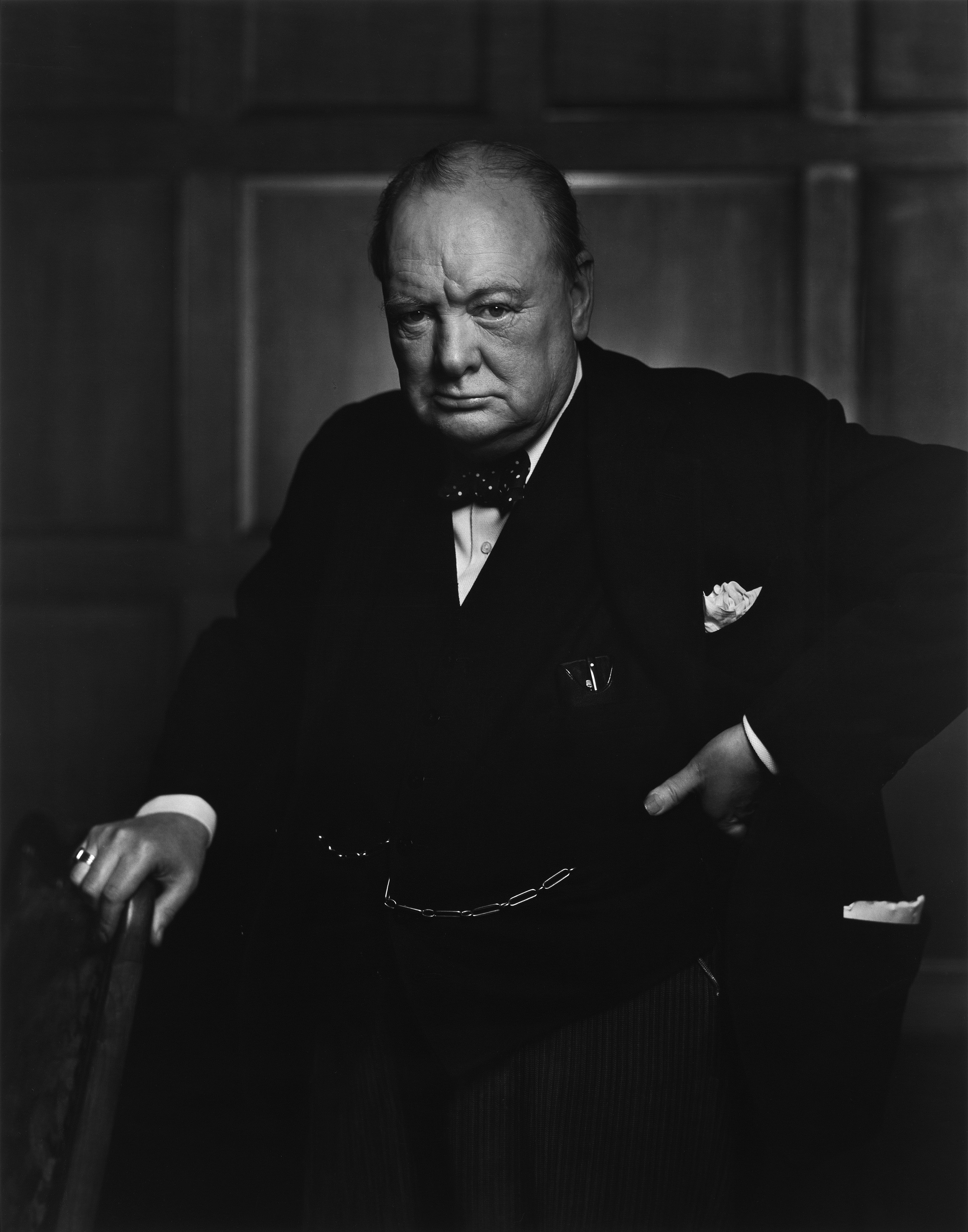
The Roaring Lion, taken shortly after the speech

According to Stanley Weintraub, the enthusiastic approval of Churchill's speech by both Francophone and Anglophone lawmakers also served to defuse the internal Canadian issue caused by the Free French Capture of Saint Pierre and Miquelon against the orders of the Royal Canadian Navy just days earlier.

Shortly after Churchill left the stage, Yousuf Karsh took the famous photograph The Roaring Lion (in the photograph, a bit of the speech may be seen poking out of Churchill's left jacket pocket).

== Notes ==
1. Although usually given in transcripts of the speech as if Churchill is directly quoting the French generals, that's not necessarily true. Churchill is describing a conversation between the French generals and French Premier Paul Reynaud to which Churchill was not party. According to Jock Colville, Reynaud had used to phrase in a letter to Marshall Petain, quoting what (according to Reynaud) Petain had said to him earlier, a copy of this letter being given to Churchill. According to the Churchill Project at Hastings College, most historians attribute the saying – if it indeed ever was said – to the Anglophobe French General Weygand, although Edward Spears considers this unlikely.
2. The idiomatic meaning of "Some chicken! Some neck!" is approximately "We have proven harder to break than the French establishment had thought!"
