= Bernard Keble Sandwell =

Canadian editor and essayist

BK Sandwell
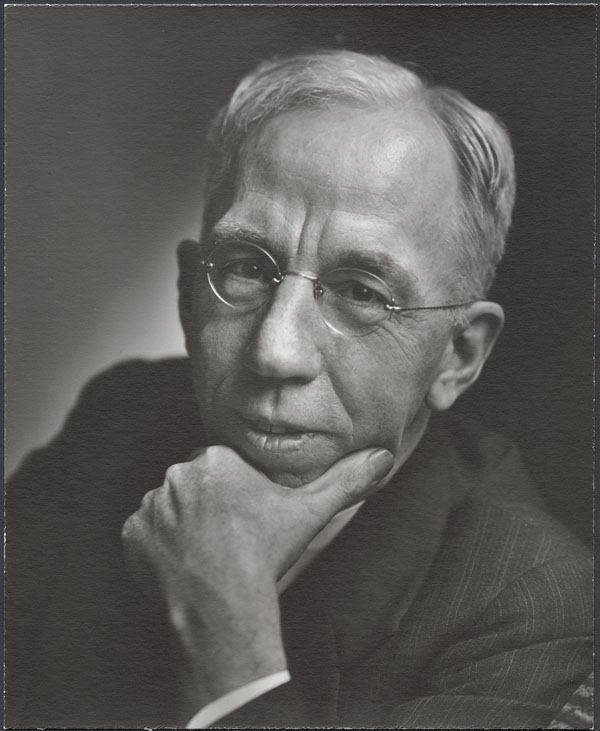
- B. K. Sandwell in 1939, by Yousuf Karsh
- Born: Bernard Keble Sandwell; December 6, 1876; Ipswich, England
- Died: December 7, 1954 (aged 78); Toronto, Ontario, Canada
- Education: University of Toronto
- Occupations: Editor, essayist
- Awards: Pierre Chauveau Medal

Bernard Keble Sandwell (December 6, 1876 – December 7, 1954) was a Canadian author, and a magazine and newspaper editor, best known as the editor of Saturday Night (1932–1951).

== Early life ==
Sandwell was born in Ipswich, England, to George Henry Sandwell, a Congregationalist minister, and Emily Johnson. He traveled to Canada where his father was posted, and attended Upper Canada College. He remained in Canada when his father's mission ended, and attended the University of Toronto from 1893 to 1897, where he gained a BA in classics.

== Career ==
On leaving university, Sandwell joined the staff at The Evening News in Toronto. He moved to Montreal in 1904 to write a drama column for the Montreal Herald. He joined the Montreal Financial Times in 1911 as an associate editor and remained there until 1919, when he joined Stephen Leacock at McGill University as an assistant professor of economics. Subsequently in 1923, Sandwell became the head of English at Queen's University.

Sandwell was often called upon as a public speaker. He made several speeches to the Empire Club of Canada throughout his career. He also wrote several books and was a frequent contributor to the Reader's Digest.

Returning to Toronto in 1931, Sandwell became the editor of Saturday Night in 1932, and made the magazine the mouthpiece of Canadian Liberalism until his retirement from the journal in 1951.

In 1944, he was appointed rector of Queen's University and in the same year he was appointed Governor of the CBC, a post held until 1947.

== Personal life and death ==
Sandwell died in 1954 of lung cancer, and was survived by his wife Marion Street Sandwell and a sister, Vera. His younger brother Captain Arnold Sandwell flew with the RNAS in World War I and served with the Royal Canadian Airforce until his death in 1940.

== Books ==
- The Musical Red Book of Montreal (1907)
- The Privacity Agent and other modest proposals (1928)
- The Molson family (1933)
- The Diversions of Duchesstown and other essays (1955)
- The Canadian Peoples (1941)
