= Bank of England £5 note =

Banknote in England and Wales

Five pounds
- Country: United Kingdom; (predominantly England and Wales)
- Value: £5 sterling
- Width: 125 mm
- Height: 65 mm
- Security features: See-through window with King's/Queen's portrait, The "£" symbol in the window changes from purple to green, finely detailed Elizabeth Tower metallic image which is gold on the front and silver on the back, circular green foil patch contains letters spelling "BLENHEIM", coloured border which changes from purple to green when the note is tilted, silver foil patch, microlettering, textured print, EURion constellations, holograms
- Material used: Polymer
- Years of printing: 1793–1944; 1945–1957; 1957–1963; 1963–1971; 1971–1990; 1990–2002; 2002–2016; 2016–2022; 2023–present (current design)

Obverse
- Design: King Charles III
- Design date: 5 June 2024

Reverse
- Design: Winston Churchill
- Design date: 5 June 2024 (Note: Data is for the newer polymer series G banknote.)

The Bank of England £5 note, also known informally as a fiver, is a sterling banknote circulated in the United Kingdom, particularly in England and Wales. (Note: Other £5 banknotes are more commonly used in Scotland and Northern Ireland) It is the smallest denomination of banknote currently issued by the Bank of England. On 13 September 2016, a new polymer note was introduced, featuring the image Queen Elizabeth II on the obverse and a portrait of Winston Churchill on the reverse. The note is of a turquoise/blue colouring. The old paper note, first issued in 2002 and bearing the image of prison reformer Elizabeth Fry on the reverse, was phased out and ceased to be legal tender after 5 May 2017.

== History ==
=== Introduction ===
Five pound notes (£5) were introduced by the Bank of England in 1793, following the ten pound note, which had been introduced in 1759 as a consequence of gold shortages caused by the Seven Years' War. The 5 pound note was introduced again, due to gold shortages caused by the French Revolutionary Wars and the Napoleonic Wars and was the lowest denomination of note issued until 1797. The earliest notes were handwritten and were issued to individuals as needed. These notes were written on one side only and bore the name of the payee, the date and the signature of the issuing cashier.

=== Restriction period ===
In 1797, due to the extra money needed to fund the war and the uncertainty caused as Britain declared war on France, a series of bank runs drained the Bank of England of its gold supply. The Bank was forced to stop exchanging gold for notes and to issue notes of £1 and £2 denominations. This was known as the "restriction period", as the exchange of notes for their value in gold was restricted.

The Restriction Period ended in 1821 as the Government had to anchor the value of the currency to gold in order to control sharply rising inflation and national debt. After a brief period to offset any sudden deflation, the UK returned to the gold standard on 1 May 1821. These notes could again be exchanged in full, or in part, for an equivalent amount of gold when presented at the bank. If redeemed in part, the banknote would be marked to indicate the amount that had been redeemed. From 1853 printed notes replaced handwritten notes, with the declaration "I promise to pay the bearer on demand the sum of five pounds" replacing the name of the payee. This declaration remains on Bank of England banknotes to this day. A printed signature of one of three cashiers appeared on the printed notes, though this was replaced by the signature of the Chief Cashier from 1870 onward. The £5 of the time was much larger and had a blank back with nothing printed on it.

=== Move away from gold standard ===
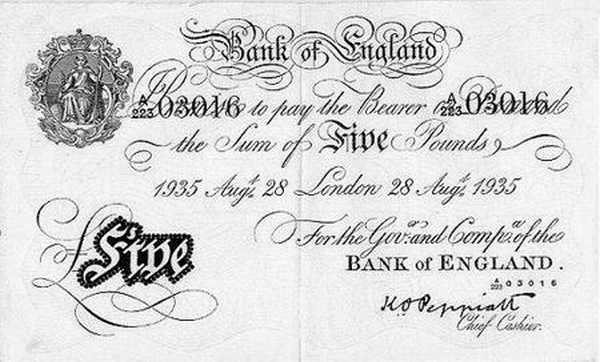
A white £5 note, issued in 1935

The right to redeem banknotes for gold ceased in 1931, when Britain stopped using the gold standard. Metal thread was introduced on the £5 note in 1945 as a security feature. The printed black and white notes were replaced from 1957 onwards by new, two-sided notes. The first two-sided £5 notes (series B) were blue and featured a bust of Britannia on the front and a lion on the back. Series C notes, first introduced in 1963, were the first notes to feature an image of the monarch on the front, with Britannia being relegated to the back. From 1971 onward, with the introduction of series D, a British historical figure was portrayed on the reverse: the soldier and statesman the Duke of Wellington in this case. Series E notes, first issued in 1990, are multicoloured, although they are predominantly turquoise-blue. These notes feature a portrait of railway pioneer George Stephenson, as well as for the first time "windowed" metal thread; this thread appears as a dashed line, yet forms a single line when held up to the light.

=== 2002 Varnish issue ===
In 2002, a problem was identified in which the serial numbers could be rubbed off some notes. The problem was highlighted after six members of the public complained to The Bank of England; banks as well as Post Offices stopped distributing the notes at the request of the Bank of England to stop issuing the new £5 notes. The Bank said the move was a "precautionary measure while we carry out further tests and investigative work into what might have caused the fault and how widespread the problem is". The bank consequently did rigorous testing and found the problem to be that the serial numbers were printed over the varnish rather than under it allowing the ink to be removed if enough force was applied. The Bank started to varnish the notes in an attempt to make them last longer than previous notes which only had an estimated lifespan of nine months.

A spokesman for the Bank of England said: "The notes are still legal tender and the public shouldn't have a problem spending them in the shops. As long as shopkeepers check the anti-counterfeit measures, then the lack of serial numbers is not a problem.

"If members of the public are concerned, then they should take the notes back to the bank where they will be exchanged."

The F series £5 note was never issued.

=== Moving to polymer ===
In April 2013, the Governor of the Bank of England Sir Mervyn King announced on behalf of the bank that Elizabeth Fry would be replaced by Winston Churchill on the next £5 note which would enter circulation in 2016. It was also announced that the images featured on the reverse would include the famous 1941 portrait of Churchill (The Roaring Lion) by Yousuf Karsh, a view of the Houses of Parliament, a quote by Churchill ("I have nothing to offer but blood, toil, tears and sweat") and a background image of Churchill's Nobel Prize in Literature, while the obverse would feature an image of Queen Elizabeth II.

In December 2013 the Bank of England announced that the next £5 note would be printed on a polymer, rather than cotton paper. The bank cited that they would be cleaner, more secure and more durable. It was also said that the new polymer notes would be more environmentally friendly, lasting 2.5 times as long as cotton paper notes, according to the Bank's own environmental testing.

The note was introduced on 13 September 2016, with an initial print run of 440 million notes (worth £2.2 billion), over the period of co-circulation. It was announced that there would be a co-circulatory period with the old series E notes, and then on 5 May 2017, the series E would cease to be legal tender. However, as with all Bank of England notes, they can be exchanged at face value at any time in the future. In 2026, Bank of England data revealed that since the change to polymer, they were receiving a greatly reduced number of claims for damaged banknotes as a result of people eating the money.

==== Ingredients controversy ====
In November 2016, there was controversy when the Bank of England confirmed that the new notes contained traces of tallow. According to an online petition on this issue, this is unacceptable to vegans, vegetarians, Muslims, Hindus, Sikhs, Jains, Jews and other groups in the UK, and one Cambridge cafe boycotted the new note. The note's manufacturer, Innovia Security, was looking into changing the recipe for the polymer used, so as to contain no animal products, which are added to polymer pellets at an early stage of production. However, on 10 August 2017 the Bank of England announced that all future notes, including future £5 note prints would continue the use of traces of tallow.

== Design ==
=== List of historical designs ===
Note	First issued	Last issued	Ceased to be legal tender	Colour	Size	Design	Additional information
White (1793)	1793	1944	1 March 1946	Monochrome (printed on one side only)	200 × 113 mm (may vary)		
White (1945)	1945	1957	13 March 1961	Monochrome (printed on one side only)	211 × 133 mm		Incorporated metal thread for first time: permanent feature until the series G polymer note
Series B	21 February 1957	1963	27 June 1967	Blue	158 × 90 mm	Front: Helmeted Britannia; Back: Lion	Saint George and the Dragon, with Britannia on the front
Series C	21 February 1963	1971	31 August 1973	Blue	140 × 85 mm	Front: Queen Elizabeth II; Back: Seated Britannia	First £5 note to carry portrait of monarch
Series D	11 November 1971	1990	29 November 1991	Predominantly blue	145 × 78 mm	Front: Queen Elizabeth II; Back: Duke of Wellington	
Series E	7 June 1990	July 2002	21 November 2003	Multicoloured (predominantly turquoise-blue)	135 × 70 mm	Front: Queen Elizabeth II; Back: George Stephenson	Notes issued from March 1993 featured the denomination symbol "£5" in bolder colours
Series E (variant)	21 May 2002	2016	5 May 2017	Multicoloured (predominantly green)	135 × 70 mm	Front: Queen Elizabeth II; Back: Elizabeth Fry	Last £5 note issued on paper
Series F	Was never issued						
Series G (I)	13 September 2016	2022		Multicoloured (turquoise)	125 × 65 mm	Front: Queen Elizabeth II; Back: Winston Churchill	First Bank of England note in polymer
Series G (II)	5 June 2024			Multicoloured (turquoise)	125 × 65 mm	Front: King Charles III; Back: Winston Churchill	First King Charles III note

Sources from the Bank of England:

=== Current designs ===
The series G (polymer) note is the only £5 note that is currently legal tender. The old paper series E was withdrawn, following a co-circulation period with both notes being legal tender which ended on 5 May 2017.

== Circulation ==
The Bank of England is responsible for printing and issuing notes to ensure a smooth monetary supply across the United Kingdom. It reports the number of notes in circulation at any given time. The £5 note circulation peaked in 1979 before the £50 was re-introduced.

End of Year	Value of notes (£)	Number in circulation
1979	3,694,000,000	738,800,000
2004	1,025,000,000	205,000,000
2005	1,054,000,000	211,000,000
2006	1,051,000,000	210,000,000
2007	1,100,000,000	220,000,000
2008	1,242,000,000	248,000,000
2009	1,342,000,000	260,000,000
2010	1,245,000,000	249,000,000
2011	1,355,000,000	271,000,000
2012	1,477,000,000	295,000,000
2013	1,526,000,000	305,000,000
2014	1,540,000,000	308,000,000
2015	1,601,000,000	320,000,000
2016	1,645,000,000	329,000,000
2017	1,912,000,000	382,400,000
2018	1,910,000,000	382,000,000
2019	1,979,000,000	396,000,000
2020	2,068,000,000	414,000,000
2021	2,034,000,000	407,000,000
2022	1,995,000,000	399,000,000

Table sources from the Bank of England Statistics

== See also ==
- Bank of England note issues
