= Toronto Life =

Canadian magazine

- Editor-in-chief: Malcolm Johnston
- Former editors: Sarah Fulford (2008-2022); John Edward Macfarlane (1972-1974, 1992-2007); Marq de Villiers (1981-1992), Don Obe (1978-1981), Thomas Hedley (1977-1978), Alexander Ross (1974-1977)
- Publisher: Jason Maghanoy
- Total circulation: 87,929 (June 2015)
- First issue: November 1966
- Company: St. Joseph Media
- Country: Canada
- Based in: Toronto
- Language: English
- Website: torontolife.com
- ISSN: 0049-4194

Toronto Life is a monthly magazine about entertainment, politics and life in Toronto, Ontario, Canada established in 1966.

Toronto Life also publishes a number of annual special interest guides about the city, including Real Estate, Stylebook, Eating & Drinking, City Home and Neighbourhoods. It is also known for publishing an annual 50 most influential people in Toronto list.

The magazine has received numerous awards, most recently a gold medal at the 2022 National Magazine Awards.

== History ==
Established in November 1966, Toronto Life was purchased by Michael de Pencier in 1972 and held until 2002, when it was sold to St. Joseph Media.

In 2015, Toronto Life had a circulation of 87,929 and readership of 890,000.

In October 2018, it was announced that Toronto Life will launch a membership program with access to Toronto Life’s events, as well as special offers from local venues.

=== Editors in chief ===
- John Edward Macfarlane from 1972 to 1974
- Alexander Ross from 1974 to 1977
- Thomas Hedley from 1977 to 1978
- Don Obe from 1978 to 1981
- Marq de Villiers from 1981 to 1992
- John Edward Macfarlane from 1992 to 2007
- Sarah Fulford 2008 to 2022
- Malcolm Johnston, 2022 to present

=== Notable Articles ===
In 2015, an article titled "Jennifer Pan’s Revenge: The inside story of a golden child, the killers she hired, and the parents she wanted dead" by Karen K. Ho brought the previously relatively obscure Jennifer Pan murder case to international attention.

== Controversies ==
=== Libel suits ===
==== Successful ====
In November 1987, Toronto Life published a 50,000-word article on the Reichmanns family written by Elaine Dewar. In January 1988, Paul, Albert and Ralph Reichmann sued Dewar and Toronto Life for $102 million, claiming that the article defamed their family.

In 1991, after exhausting the cover of Toronto Life's libel insurance policy, an out-of-court settlement was reached between the parties that saw the article retracted and Toronto Life make “a substantial donation to four charities” designated by the Reichmanns.

In its apology, Toronto Life said its article "incorporated many allegations and insinuations about the Reichmann family which ... there was no reasonable basis for" and said it now realized that "none of the allegations and insinuations should ever have been raised."

Stephen Trumper, the president of Toronto Life Publishing Co., said “we should have been much more rigorous in that process and more precise in our conclusions,” and that “any and all negative insinuations and allegations in the article... are totally false.”

==== Unsuccessful ====
In April 2015, Canadian entrepreneur Michael Elder, the son of Jim Elder, attempted to sue the magazine to prevent publication of a feature about him. Superior Court dismissed the motion for an injunction and awarded the magazine $17,000 in costs.

=== Unlawful employment practices ===
In March 2014, Toronto Life was required to shut down its unpaid internship program implemented in 2009, after the Ontario Ministry of Labour declared that its longstanding practice of not paying interns was in contravention of the Employment Standards Act.

The magazine responded, saying "The idea that we can start paying everybody completely misunderstands the nature of the economics of the magazine industry at the moment."

Toronto Life's first (unpaid) intern, Derek Finkle, started with the magazine in 1993. During his internship he wrote a cover story for the magazine for free. He weighed in on the controversy saying that he backs the decision of the Ontario Ministry of Labour.

=== Journalism ethics violations ===
In December 2014, Toronto Star published an investigation stating that in 2013, the magazine dismissed a feature about 15 women Jian Ghomeshi was dating after the protest of his PR team.

In January 2018, the magazine was accused of hiding a published negative review of steakhouse BlueBlood from its website.

== Awards & recognition ==
The magazine is a major winner of the Canadian National Magazine Awards, leading current publications with 110 gold awards including 3 awards for Magazine of the Year in 1985, 1989, and 2007.

Toronto Life also won the Magazine Grand Prix award at the 2021 National Magazine Awards, with the jury writing that it is

"alert to the cultural moment, bold in its journalistic exposés, up-to-the-minute in its services reportage and smart about the platforms it uses to deliver content to readers. The issues its editorial team, led by Editor in Chief Malcolm Johnston, assembled during the pandemic showed just how relevant and useful a first-class city magazine can be."
