= Maisonneuve (magazine) =

General interest magazine in Montreal, Canada

- Winter 2010 issue cover
- Editor: Aysha White
- Categories: Arts, ideas
- Frequency: Quarterly
- Founded: 2002
- Country: Canada
- Based in: Montreal, Quebec
- Language: Canadian English
- Website: maisonneuve.org

Maisonneuve is an English-language general interest literary-journalism magazine based in Montreal, Quebec, Canada. It publishes eclectic stories of national and international scope on the arts, culture, and politics.

== History and profile ==
Established in 2002 by Derek Webster, the magazine is named after Paul de Chomedey de Maisonneuve, the founder of Montreal. It defines its mandate as "to dissolve artistic borders between regions, countries, languages, and genres." Carmine Starnino, current Editor-in-Chief of The Walrus, worked at the magazine for nine years. Drew Nelles served as the editor-in-chief of the magazine. Aysha White is the current Editor-in-Chief and served as the magazine's Associate Editor prior to assuming the role.

Maisonneuve has won many awards for its writing, covers, illustration, and photojournalism. It was named Magazine of the Year in 2005, 2012, and 2016 (National Magazine Awards), Small Magazine of the Year in 2006 (Editors' Choice Awards), and Newsstand Magazine of the Year (Canadian Newsstand Awards) in 2007, among many other awards for individual features. Over the summer of 2026, Maisonneuve published its 100th issue.
