= John Edward Macfarlane =

- Born: March 28, 1942 (age 84); Montreal, Quebec
- Known for: Editor of Toronto Life

John Edward Macfarlane (born March 28, 1942) was the editor of the Canadian magazine The Walrus from 2008 to 2014. He previously served as editor of Toronto Life from 1992 to 2007.

Born in Montreal, Quebec, he attended the University of Toronto Schools and Western Canada High School. He studied at the University of Calgary, where in his second year he became editor of The Gauntlet. In 1965, he started as an editorial writer at The Globe and Mail becoming an entertainment editor in 1967. In 1968, he became an entertainment editor at the Toronto Star and became an associate editor at Maclean's in 1970. From 1972 to 1974, he was the editor of Toronto Life, leaving in 1974 as president of Analytical Communications Incorporated, a public relations company. From 1975 to 1976, he was executive editor of Maclean's. From 1976 to 1980, he was the editor of Weekend Magazine. From 1980 to 1987, he was the publisher of Saturday Night. From 1987 to 1990, he was the publisher and editor-in-chief of the Financial Times of Canada. Briefly, from 1991 to 1992, he was the managing director of news, features and information programming at CTV. In 1992, he was appointed editor at Toronto Life and is also the vice-president of strategic development of Toronto Life's owner, St. Joseph's Media. In 2007, Sarah Fulford took over as editor.

He is the co-author of the 1972 book, The Death of Hockey.

Macfarlane was named a Member of the Order of Canada in 2017.
