= Craig Taylor =

Craig Taylor may refer to:

- Craig Taylor (footballer) (born 1974), English footballer
- Craig Taylor (writer) (born 1976), Canadian writer
- Craig Taylor (fl. 2000s), American musician in Lydia
- Craig Taylor (American football) (born 1966), former American football running back
- C. M. Taylor (born 1972), English writer
- S. Craig Taylor (1946–2012), American game designer
