= Financial Times of Canada =

Defunct Canadian newspaper

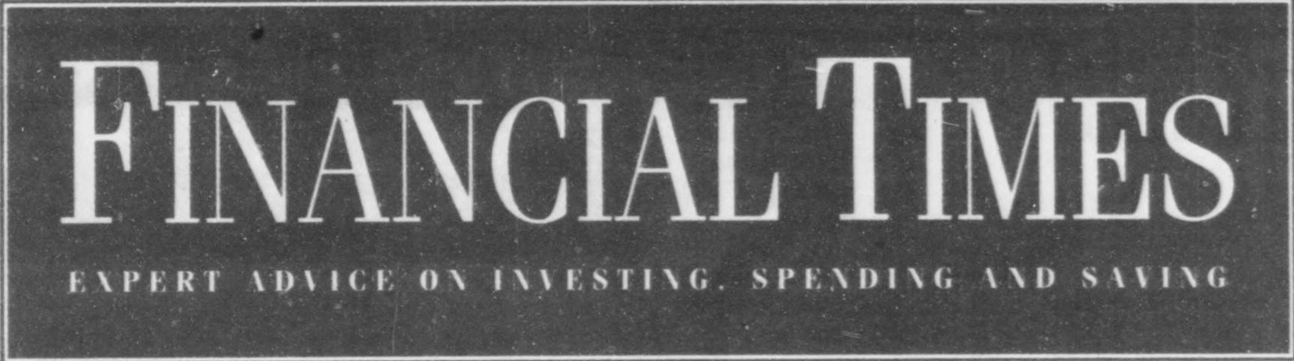
- 1995 logo
- Format: Compact (1912-1989); Tabloid (1989-1995)
- Publisher: Southam Inc. (1961-1989); Thomson Corporation (1989-1995)
- Founded: 21 June 1912
- Ceased publication: 18 March 1995
- Political alignment: Free Market
- Language: English
- Headquarters: Montreal (1912-1975); Toronto (1975-1995)
- Circulation: 5,000 (1962); 50,000 (1974); 105,000 (1987); 118,000 (1989)
- ISSN: 0015-2056
- OCLC number: 1080969066

Financial Times of Canada, originally entitled Montreal Financial Times, was a business-focused weekly newspaper published in Canada between 1912 and 1995.

== History ==
The newspaper was first published on 21 June 1912, and was originally entitled the Montreal Financial Times. In 1961 it was bought by Southam-Maclean Publications Limited, owned by Southam Company Limited, which was later renamed Southam Inc. Michael Barkway was named editor and publisher of the paper in 1962, staying in those positions until 1974, during which time circulation of the paper increased from 5,000 to 50,000. On 1 July 1975 the headquarters of the newspaper moved to Toronto, Ontario.

In the late 1980s the newspaper became locked in a circulations battle with other Toronto-based business publications, including the Globe and Mail's daily Report on Business, and Toronto Sun Publishing Corp's Financial Post. John Macfarlane became editor in 1987. In 1988 the newspaper was revamped into a tabloid format, with a buff-coloured front cover, and with a greater focus on analytical pieces. However, this resulted in only a relatively small increase in circulation from 105,000 in 1987 to 118,000 in 1989, with the publication losing more than $10 million in 1988 and 1989. As a result, Southam Inc. decided to sell the newspaper, putting it up for sale on 26 October 1989, and announcing its sale to the Thompson Newspapers Corp., owners of the Globe and Mail in December 1989 for an undisclosed sum.

Failure of the newspaper to compete successfully with the Globe and Mail's business section and the Financial Post after it switched to a daily format during the mid-90s led to a decline in the newspaper's fortune. Steve Lawrence was brought in to edit the paper in 1991 in an effort to save it, but left in 1993. In 1993 the paper contested a gagging order brought against them by Miko Leung, president of MTC Electronic Technologies, on reporting on the content of court files including a lawsuit brought against Leung by his former wife, and questioned whether an announced Chinese business deal was in fact real. By 1994 Miko Leung had fled to Hong Kong and the share-price of MTC had collapsed.

By 1995 the newspaper had shrunk to a third of its peak size of 70 pages, with staff-cuts also being carried out. In 1995 it was decided to shut down the newspaper, with the final edition being published on 18 March 1995.

== Editor-in-chief ==
- Bernard Keble Sandwell (1912-1919)
- Michael Barkway (1961-1974)
- David Tafler (1974-1984)
- Terence Corcoran (1984-1987)
- John Macfarlane (1987-1989)
- Michael Posner (1989-1991)
- Steve Lawrence (1991-1993)
- James Fleming (1993-1995)
