= L'actualité =

Canadian French-language news

L’actualité
- Categories: News magazine
- Frequency: 10 per year
- Total circulation: 160,070 (December 2011)
- Founded: 1909; 117 years ago
- Company: Mishmash Media (XPND Capital)
- Country: Canada
- Based in: Montreal
- Language: French
- Website: www.lactualite.com
- ISSN: 0001-7698

L'actualité is a Canadian French-language news and general interest magazine published in Montreal by Rogers Communications until 2016, then by Mishmash (XPND Capital). The magazine has over a million readers, according to Canada's Print Measurement Bureau, from its circulation which is mainly subscribers. Eighty-six percent of its readership are Québécois.

== History and profile ==
The magazine was established in 1909 with the name Bulletin paroissial. Its name was changed several times: L'Action paroissiale (1932), Ma paroisse (1949), L'actualité (1960) and L'actualité magazine (1967). Until 1945 Jesuit Armand Proulx served as the editor-in-chief of the magazine.

Maclean Hunter, publisher of Maclean's, acquired the mailing list of the defunct Actualité magazine in the 1970s, and merged it with its own French-language edition, Le Magazine Maclean (c. 1961) in 1976. Maclean Hunter was acquired by Rogers Communications in the 1990s. Journalist Jean Paré was the editor-in-chief of L'actualité until 1998. The magazine has published special reports on the regulation of genetically modified organisms, the rise of the Action démocratique du Québec (ADQ), the rehabilitation process of soldiers and the story of Captain Simon Mailloux, the record of the Quebec welfare state and on the possible legalization of sharia law in Ontario.

The magazine became part of the Rogers Media corporate family in 1994 when Rogers acquired Maclean-Hunter.

Rogers Media announced on September 30, 2016 plans to sell its French print media, including L'actualité. The magazine was acquired by Mishmash media, a division of the private equity firm XPND Capital, in December 2016.
