= The Roaring Lion =

1941 photograph of Winston Churchill

- Winston Churchill
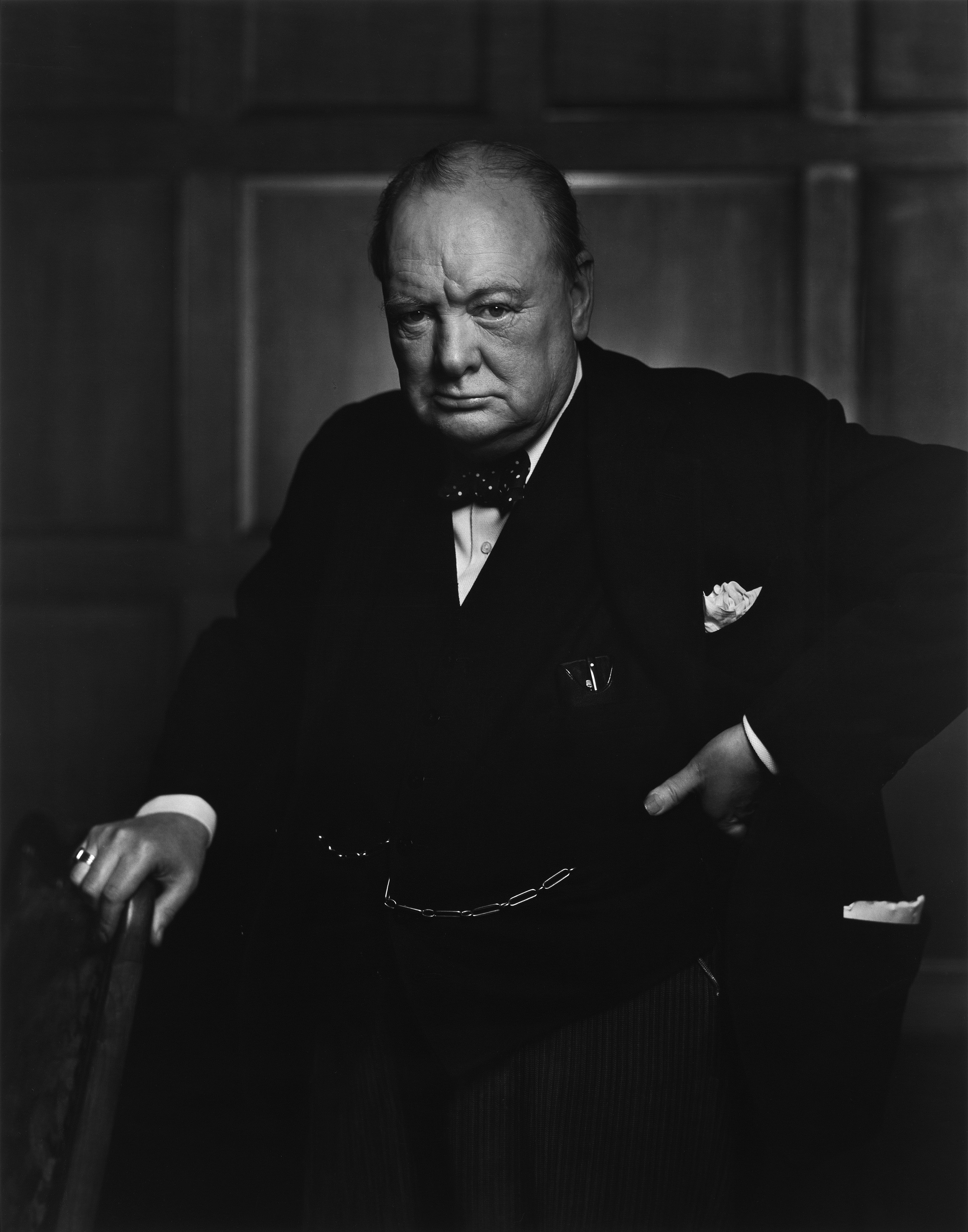
- Artist: Yousuf Karsh
- Year: 1941
- Medium: Photograph
- Subject: Winston Churchill
- Dimensions: 8 by 10 in (200 by 250 mm)
- Location: Ottawa, Canada
- Accession: MIKAN 3915740

The Roaring Lion is a black and white photographic portrait of a 67-year-old Winston Churchill as Prime Minister of the United Kingdom. The portrait was taken in 1941 by Yousuf Karsh in the Centre Block on Parliament Hill in Ottawa, Ontario, Canada.

== Date and location of photography ==
The photograph was shot on December 30, 1941, by Armenian-Canadian photographer Yousuf Karsh in the Speaker's Chamber of the Canadian House of Commons at Parliament in Ottawa after Churchill delivered his "Some chicken, some neck" speech on World War II to Canadian members of parliament (the photograph shows a bit of the speech poking out from Churchill's left jacket pocket). The brief photo session was arranged by the Canadian prime minister, William Lyon Mackenzie King. The photo was taken with a Calumet Photographic 8 by 10 in (200 by 250 mm) view camera.

== Description ==
Churchill is particularly noted for his posture and facial expression, likened to the wartime feelings that prevailed in the UK—persistence in the face of an all-conquering enemy. The photo session was only to last two minutes. Karsh asked the prime minister to put down his cigar, as the smoke would interfere with the image. Churchill refused, so just before taking the photograph, Karsh quickly moved toward the prime minister and said, "Forgive me, sir," while snatching the cigar from his subject's mouth. Karsh said, "By the time I got back to the camera, he looked so belligerent, he could have devoured me". His scowl has been compared to "a fierce glare as if confronting the enemy". Following the taking of the photo, Churchill stated, "You can even make a roaring lion stand still to be photographed," thus giving the picture its notable name.

USC Fisher Museum of Art described it as a "defiant and scowling portrait [which] became an instant icon of Britain's stand against fascism."

== Impact on Karsh's career ==
The resulting image—one of the 20th century's most iconic portraits—effectively launched Karsh's international career.

My portrait of Winston Churchill changed my life. I knew after I had taken it that it was an important picture, but I could hardly have dreamed that it would become one of the most widely reproduced images in the history of photography.

— Yousuf Karsh

Signed prints of this portrait from Karsh's studio were produced using gelatin silver on paper. They were signed as "© Y Karsh Ottawa" in white marker in the lower left or lower right corner. This later changed to Karsh signing in ink on one of the lower corners of the white border surrounding the photograph. Early print sizes ranged from 8 1/2 by 11 in (220 by 280 mm) or 11 by 14 in (280 by 360 mm) then progressed to 16 by 20 in (410 by 510 mm) and 20 by 24 in (510 by 610 mm) respectively in later years.

== Uses ==
The photograph appeared on the cover of the May 21, 1945, issue of Life, which bought its one-time use for $100. One of the first prints of the original negative hangs on the wall in the Speaker's Chamber of the Speaker of the House of Commons of Canada, where the image was photographed. In 2008, Canada Post released a CA$1.60 commemorative stamp of the image; 325,000 copies were printed. Since 2016, it has appeared on the £5 note issued by the Bank of England.

In 2019, the Royal Canadian Mint, with permission from the Karsh estate, released a 10 oz (280 g) pure silver CA$100 face value coin. Only 700 examples were minted.

The original negative and the vast collection of Karsh's images were donated by his estate to the Library and Archives Canada in 1992. Since then, copies taken from the original negative have not been allowed.

== Theft of an original signed print ==
In 1998, an original signed print of the image was installed in the reading room of the Fairmont Château Laurier hotel in Ottawa, where Karsh and his wife Estrellita had lived, and where he operated his studio, from 1972 until 1992. Jerry Fielder, the director of Karsh's estate, said that the print was 20 in × 24 in (510 mm × 610 mm) and printed on lithographic paper. On August 19, 2022, it was discovered that this print had been stolen and replaced with a fake. A staff member noticed that the frame on the picture did not match the other portraits in the lounge. Fielder identified this portrait as a forgery.

When the theft was discovered, it made headlines around the world. People sent in photos they had taken of The Roaring Lion in prior visits; these photos showed either the original or the fake and were able to be dated. By studying the photos, investigators were able to determine that the earliest photo of the fake was taken on January 6, 2022, and the latest photo of the original was taken on December 25, 2021, meaning that the theft occurred between those dates.

Jeffrey Wood, 43, from Powassan, Ontario, was arrested on April 25, 2024, and charged with multiple offences relating to the theft of the print. On September 11, 2024, the Ottawa Police Service stated that the original print had been located in Italy. A lawyer from Genoa had purchased the print at a Sotheby's auction for less than CA$10,000 plus auction house's commission in May 2022 and he was unaware that it had been stolen. Five months later, in October 2022, Sotheby's asked him to connect with Canadian authorities. Sotheby's and Canadian police asked him not to resell or dispose of the print. By January 2023, Ottawa police confirmed that this print was the one that had been stolen. A special ceremony was held at the Canadian Embassy in Rome to hand over the print to the Canadian authorities in September 2024. The print was reinstalled at the Fairmont Château Laurier on November 15 with additional security features safeguarding the photo. Wood pleaded guilty on March 14, 2025, and was sentenced to two years' imprisonment on May 26.

== See also ==
- List of photographs considered the most important
