= Jean Paré (journalist) =

Jean Paré (born 1935 in Quebec City) is a Quebecois journalist, writer and publisher.

== Biography ==
Jean Paré completed classical studies at the Petit Séminaire de Québec and at the College Levis and then scientific studies at Montreal University (1955–1958). In 1992 he and some colleagues of other publishing houses were at the origins of the formation of the QAME (Quebecer Association of Magazine Editors), of which Paré was the first chairman until 1993. He was also broadcaster and radio commentator. Jean Paré wrote many books and also translated the work of many Anglo-Canadian writers, including Marshall McLuhan and Michael Ignatieff, former leader of the Canadian liberal party.

=== L’actualité ===
He is mostly known for founding the newspaper L'actualité, which he ran for over 25 years. He was also chairman of the media group Maclean Hunter Quebec and then of Rogers Media Publishing from 1995 until 2000.

The first issue of the magazine L’actualité, published by the group Maclean Hunter, was released in September 1976. The purpose of this new monthly newspaper, born from the merger of Le Magazine Maclean and Actualité, is to give information about the political, economic, cultural and social news from here and elsewhere. The founders of L’actualité are Lloyd M. Hodgkinson, publisher, and Jean Paré, who was editor at that time. Jean Paré had succeeded to Louis Martin at the head of Le Magazine Maclean in April 1975 and had immediately set himself the task of creating a lasting newspaper with both of those struggling publications. Le Magazine Maclean was created in 1981. The other, Actualité, was the property of Claude Martin, a gallery-owner in Drummondville, and was founded around the same time by a group of influential Montrealers, among them Lucien Saulnier, town-councilor. The first editor of this newspaper was the Jesuit Jean-Louis Brouillé.

25 years later, when Jean Paré left, so at the end of the year 2000, L’actualité, which had become bimonthly in 1990, was still one of the biggest editorial successes in Quebec. While Le Magazine Maclean had been the loyal companion of the quiet revolution during the 60s, L’actualité became the witness of the new orientations of Quebec society and of the success of the new young generation. The newspaper played an important role at the time of the referendums in 1980 and 1995, as well as during the constitutional negotiations of 1982 and during the so-called Meech Lake accord and Charlottetown Accord.

== Sources ==
- Historique de l'actualité
- Le journalisme scientifique : ses publics et son marché, Carleton University, 26 April 2002
