= Sarah Fuller =

Sarah Fuller may refer to:

- Sarah Fuller (athlete) (born 1999), American soccer player and football kicker
- Sarah Fuller (educator) (1836–1927), American educator of the deaf
- Sarah E. Fuller (1838–1913), American philanthropist and social leader
- Sarah Margaret Fuller (1810–1850), American journalist, critic and women's rights activist

== See also ==
- Sarah Fuller Flower Adams (1805–1848), English poet
