= C. M. Taylor =

English novelist (born 1972)

C. M. Taylor (born 1972) is the pen name of Craig Taylor, an English novelist, screenwriter and lecturer.

== Life ==
Born in Birmingham in 1972, C. M. Taylor has lived in West Yorkshire, Suffolk, Cambridge, Edinburgh, India, Spain and Brussels. He is married with two daughters and currently lives in Oxford.

C. M. Taylor has ghostwritten for an internationally best-selling author, and contributed material to Plan B's The Ballad of Belmarsh album. His journalism has appeared widely, including in The Guardian and The Daily Telegraph.

== Early work ==
Taylor's novel Cloven is a dark treatment of the BSE epidemic in Britain in the 1990s.

The dystopian satire Grief was nominated for Best Book of the Year 2005 by the British Science Fiction Association and was described in the BSFA's review as a work of "breathtaking originality." Steve Redwood of The Future Fire also praised the novel. Grief was republished in 2020 as City of O.

The novella Light is set in the e-commerce boom of the late 1990s and features the author's own Primitivist drawings. In Time Out London the novelist Nicholas Royle described Light as "delightfully unusual."

== The Kev King books ==
Published by Corsair, an imprint of Constable & Robinson, Taylor's Premiership Psycho is a dark satire on the excesses of celebrity and football culture. Simon Redfern of The Independent praised the book, saying: "As with all good satire, this dystopian vision inspires laughter and loathing in equal measure."

Reviewer Gary Andrews described the novel as "a slight reworking – part pastiche, part homage – of Ellis’ classic novel [American Psycho], only with the action relocation from Wall Street to the Premier League".

FourFourTwo magazine called the book "American Psycho for the hundred grand a week generation...".

== Recent work ==
In December 2014, Taylor launched the "immersive narrative app" Reptile Resistance in collaboration with John Crump through the crowdfunding publisher Unbound; funding was secured in 2017. The app is illustrated by the artist Pete Fowler.

Taylor co-wrote (with Jeremy Sheldon) the screenplay of the 2015 film Writers Retreat.

Taylor's novel Staying On was published by Duckworth in 2018 and described as a "geriatric coming-of-age story". In 2014 he began a project with the British Library to document the creative process of writing the book. In a 2017 interview Taylor explained: "They have put what is effectively a piece of spyware on a laptop on which I’m writing a novel, and this spyware documents every key stroke I make, and documents the time it was made." The data from this collaboration was published in 2018.

Taylor is senior lecturer in publishing at the Oxford International Centre for Publishing Studies.

== Published works ==
- Light, as C. M. Taylor (ISBN 978-1-905315-00-0, ebook ISBN 978-1-905315-11-6)
- Grief, as C. M. Taylor (first published under the name Ed Lark) (ISBN 978-1-905315-02-4, ebook ISBN 978-1-905315-10-9)
- Cloven, as C. M. Taylor (ISBN 978-1-905315-04-8, ebook ISBN 978-1-905315-12-3)
- Premiership Psycho, as C. M. Taylor (2011, ISBN 978-1-84901-594-3)
- Group of Death, as C. M. Taylor (2012, ebook ISBN 978-1-47210-208-9)
- Staying On, as C. M. Taylor (2018, ISBN 978-0-71565-337-1)
