= Michael de Pencier =

Canadian businessman (1935–2024)

Michael Christian de Pencier
- Born: January 19, 1935; Toronto, Ontario, Canada
- Died: October 6, 2024 (aged 89)
- Education: University of Michigan
- Awards: Order of Canada; Order of Ontario

Michael Christian de Pencier, CM OOnt (January 19, 1935 – October 6, 2024) was a Canadian businessman, environmental investor, and publisher. He is the grandson of Archbishop Adam de Pencier and brother-in-law of Richard A. N. Bonnycastle.

== Life and career ==
Born in Toronto, Ontario on January 19, 1935, de Pencier attended Trinity College School, the University of Toronto where he was a member of the Toronto Chapter of Alpha Delta Phi, and the University of Michigan. He was the chairman of Key Publishers Company Limited. In this role, he launched, acquired or ran many of the country’s leading magazines, including Toronto Life, Canadian Geographic, Quill and Quire, Where Magazines and Canadian Business.

An active environmental investor, de Pencier was the co-founder of Investeco Capital Corporation and the Green Living Show. He was also the past Chairman of WWF-Canada and the Ontario College of Art. In 2013, he was honored as the 2013 leader for conservation.

As one of Canada's leading magazine publishers, de Pencier was awarded the Order of Ontario in 1997, the Order of Canada in 1999, and an honorary Doctor of Letters in 2002 from Ryerson University.

De Pencier was the father of film producers Nicholas de Pencier and Miranda de Pencier. He died on October 6, 2024, at the age of 89.
