= Yousuf Karsh =

Canadian photographer (1908–2002)

Yousuf Karsh CC RCA FRPS
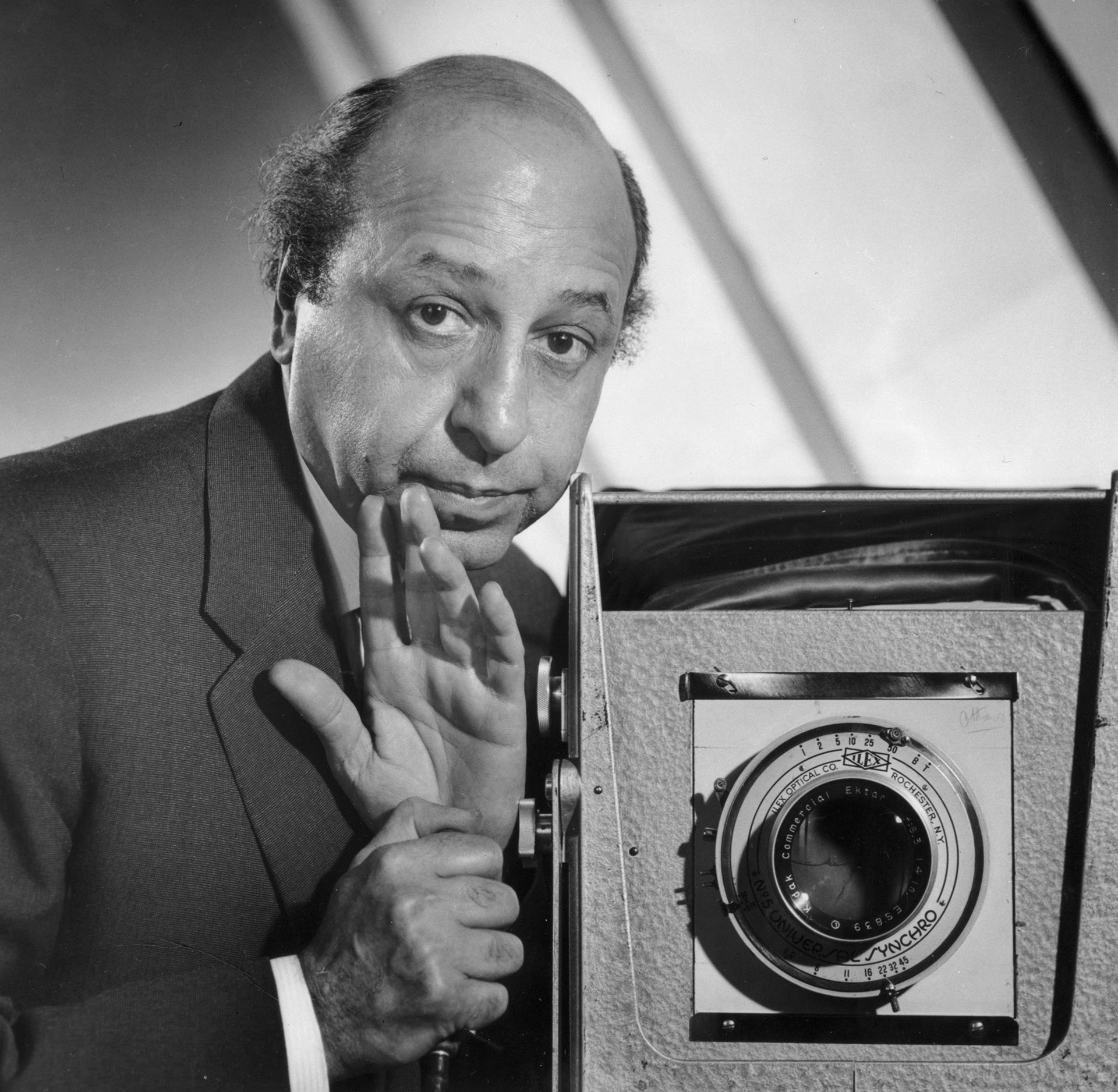
- Karsh in 1958
- Born: December 23, 1908; Mardin, Diyarbekir Vilayet, Ottoman Empire (present-day Turkey)
- Died: July 13, 2002 (aged 93); Boston, Massachusetts, U.S.
- Burial place: Notre-Dame Cemetery
- Citizenship: Canada (from 1947)
- Spouses: Solange Gauthier (m. 1939; died 1961); Estrellita Nachbar (m. 1962)
- Relatives: Malak Karsh (brother)
- Website: karsh.org

Signature
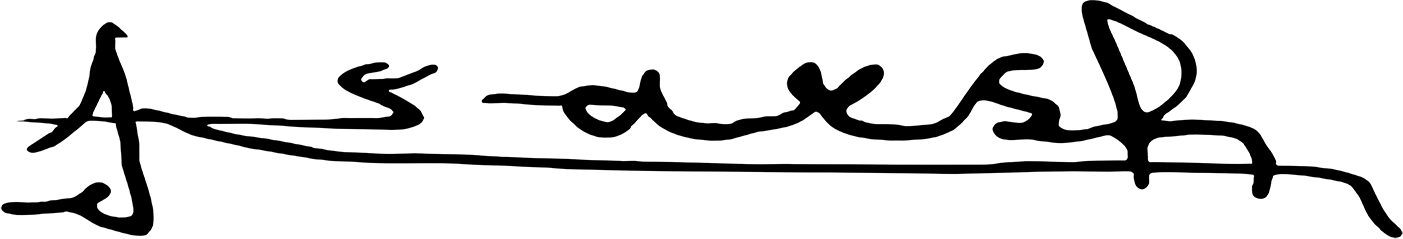

Yousuf Karsh (December 23, 1908 – July 13, 2002) was an Armenian-Canadian photographer, known for his portraits of notable individuals. He has been described as one of the greatest portrait photographers of the 20th century.

An Armenian genocide survivor, Karsh emigrated to Canada as a refugee. By the 1930s, he established himself as a significant photographer in Ottawa, where he lived most of his adult life, though he traveled extensively for work. His iconic 1941 photograph of Winston Churchill marked a major turning point in his career and brought him international recognition. More than 20 photos by Karsh appeared on the cover of Life magazine, until he retired in 1993.

== Early life and arrival in Canada ==
Yousuf Karsh (Note: Armenian sources sometimes refer to him as Hovsep Karsh, which is the Armenian equivalent of Yousuf; both are variants of the name Joseph. The Armenian population of his hometown Mardin were largely Arabic-speaking.) was born to Ottoman Armenian parents Amsih Karsh (1872–1962), a merchant, and Bahia Nakash (1883–1958), on December 23, 1908, in Mardin, Diyarbekir Vilayet (present day Mardin Province, Turkey). His father was a weaver and importer of artisanal goods, including spices, indigo, silks, and textiles acquired through markets along the Persian Gulf, while his mother, the daughter of an engraver, had been educated at the Protestant-sponsored American Mission School. He had two brothers, Jamil and Malak.

Karsh grew up during the Armenian genocide, an experience marked by displacement, starvation, and exposure to violence, including acts committed against members of his own family. "My recollections of those days comprise a strange mixture of blood and beauty, of persecution and peace," he later wrote. Karsh and his family escaped to a refugee camp in Aleppo, Syria in 1922 in a month-long journey with a Kurdish caravan. The Economist's obituary said Karsh "thought of himself as an Armenian". According to Vartan Gregorian: "Although he was proud to be Canadian, Karsh was equally proud to be Armenian."

In 1923, Karsh's parents arranged for him, at the age of fifteen, to immigrate to Canada as part of a humanitarian initiative to reunite displaced Armenians with relatives already living in the country. He arrived in Halifax, Nova Scotia on December 31, 1923, by ship from Beirut. He immediately moved to Sherbrooke, Quebec to live with his maternal uncle George Nakashian (Nakash), a portrait photographer. He attended Sherbrooke High School for a year and his "formal education was over almost before it began." By the time he reached Canada, he "spoke little French, and less English" and "had no money and little schooling." Karsh worked for, and was taught photography by his uncle. He gave Karsh a Box Brownie camera.

== Career ==
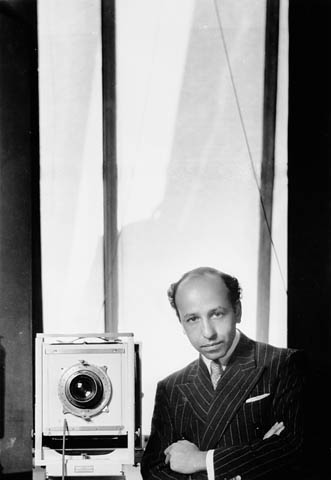
Karsh in 1938

Karsh began working in his uncle's studio, where he learned the fundamentals of portrait photography, including the use of large-format cameras, glass plate negatives, and darkroom printing. In 1928, Nakash arranged for Karsh to continue his training in Boston, Massachusetts, as an assistant to John H. Garo, a prominent portrait photographer and member of Armenian diaspora. During his apprenticeship, Karsh developed both technical proficiency and the social skills required to photograph prominent figures by observing Garo himself photograph Boston celebrities. His mentorship with Garo ended in 1931 when his temporary work papers expired, requiring him to return to Canada.

Karsh settled in Ottawa, initially working for photographer John Powis; his first commissions were from local Ottawa theatre groups. Karsh opened his first studio in 1932. It was located on the second floor of a building at 130 Sparks Street, which was later named the Hardy Arcade. He remained there until 1972, when he moved to the Château Laurier. He was known professionally as "Karsh of Ottawa", which was also his signature.

He achieved initial success by capturing the attention of Canadian Prime Minister Mackenzie King, who helped Karsh arrange photography sessions with visiting dignitaries. Karsh was also introduced into the Rideau Hall social circle, and his portraits of Lord Bessborough, Governor General from 1931 to 1935, and his wife were widely published. Karsh became a member of the Ottawa Camera Club and exhibited works in the International Salon of Photography exhibitions held at the National Gallery of Canada from 1934 onwards.

Throughout his life, Karsh photographed "anyone who was anyone." When asked why he almost exclusively captured famous people, he replied, "I am working with the world's most remarkable cross-section of people. I do believe it's the minority who make the world go around, not the majority." He once also jokingly remarked, "I do it for my own immortality." By the time he retired in 1992, more than 20 of his photos had appeared on the cover of Life magazine.

Karsh's photos were known for their use of dramatic lighting, which became the hallmark of his portrait style. Before a sitting, Karsh researched his subjects and talked to them. He also often used props in his portraits, some of which were emblematic of his sitters' professions. He had studied it with both Garo in Boston and at the Ottawa Little Theatre, of which he was a member. Karsh's involvement with the Ottawa Little Theatre played an important role in shaping both his technical approach and professional network. Through Ottawa's theatre community, Karsh gained access to broader cultural and political circles through his introduction to Adele M. Gianelii, social editor of Saturday Night magazine.

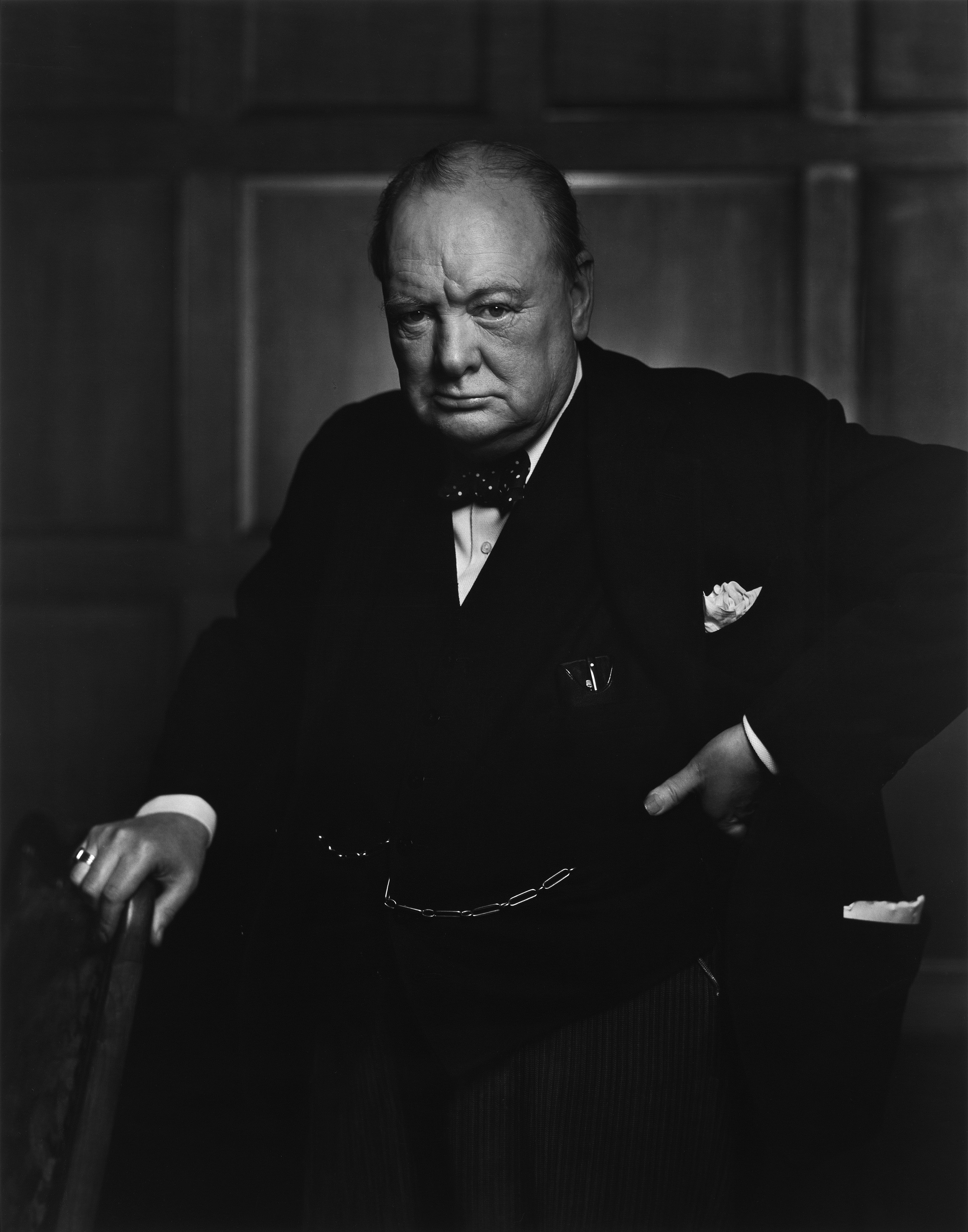
Karsh's portrait of Winston Churchill, titled The Roaring Lion, December 30, 1941

His 1941 photo, The Roaring Lion, featuring British Prime Minister Winston Churchill, brought him international prominence. The photograph was taken on December 30, 1941, in the Speaker's Chamber of the House of Commons in the Canadian Parliament in Ottawa, moments after Churchill delivered a wartime address to members of the Canadian Senate and House of Commons. The sitting was arranged by Canadian Prime Minister William Lyon Mackenzie King. Churchill is particularly noted for his posture and facial expression, which have been compared to the wartime feelings that prevailed in the UK: persistence in the face of an all-conquering enemy. During the sitting Karsh requested that Churchill remove his cigar from his mouth, since he refused, Karsh snatched the cigar away moments before he took the famous exposure, capturing the prime minister's reactionary expression. Churchill was miffed and showed his displeasure in the portrait.

The photo, which according to The Economist is the "most reproduced portrait in the history of photography", has been described as one of the "most iconic portraits ever shot". USC Fisher Museum of Art described it as a "defiant and scowling portrait [which] became an instant icon of Britain's stand against fascism." It appeared on the cover of the May 21, 1945, issue of Life, which bought it for $100. One of the first prints of the original currently hangs on the wall in the Speaker's chamber of the Speaker of the House of Commons of Canada, where the iconic image was photographed. It is considered Churchill's most famous picture and appears on the Bank of England £5 note.

On August 19, 2022, it was discovered that a Karsh-signed portrait residing in the reading room of the Château Laurier, Ottawa, had been stolen and replaced with a fake. A staff member noticed that the frame on the portrait did not match the other five portraits donated by Karsh in 1998. Jerry Fielder, the director of Karsh's estate, immediately recognized that the Karsh signature on the portrait was a forgery. Two years later Ottawa police announced that the photo had been located in Italy and had arrested an Ontario man in connection with its theft. The accused thief, Jeffrey Wood, pled guilty on March 14, 2025.

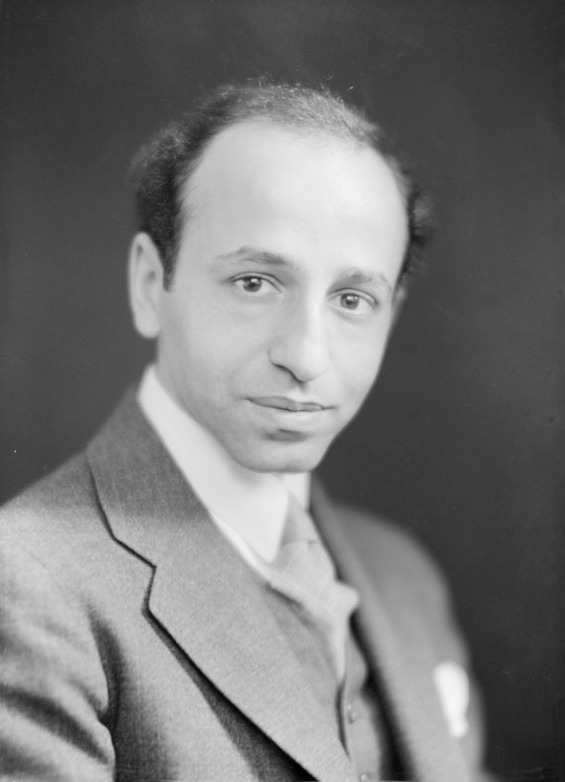
Karsh in 1936

During World War II, Karsh photographed political and military leaders and began capturing photos of writers, actors, artists, musicians, scientists, and celebrities in the post-war period. Between 1938 and 1944, Karsh's work was featured in photographic salons at the National Gallery of Canada, followed by major solo exhibitions including Karsh Photographs (1959) and Karsh: The Art of the Portrait (1989), hold held at the National Gallery in Ottawa. His 1957 portrait of the American novelist Ernest Hemingway, taken at Hemingway's Cuban home Finca Vigía, is another well-known photo by Karsh. According to Amanda Hopkinson it made Hemingway look like the hero of his 1952 novel The Old Man and the Sea. His other notable portraits include George Bernard Shaw at an old age (1943), Dwight D. Eisenhower as a five-star general and Supreme Commander of the Allied Expeditionary Force (1946), American artist Georgia O'Keeffe in her New Mexico studio (1956), and Soviet leader Nikita Khrushchev swathed in fur (1963). In 1984, Karsh photographed the Canadian rock band Rush for their album Grace Under Pressure.

Besides portraits of the famous, Karsh photographed assembly line workers in Windsor, Ontario, commissioned by the Ford Motor Company of Canada. He also shot photos for Canadair that were used in an advertising campaign. His landscape photographs of Rome and the Holy Land were included in books in collaboration with Bishop Fulton J. Sheen, an annual poster for the Muscular Dystrophy Association, and other works.

Karsh closed his studio at Château Laurier in June 1992. His penultimate sittings in May 1993 were with President Bill Clinton and First Lady Hillary.

He was a visiting professor at Ohio University and at Emerson College in Boston.

Of the 100 most famous people of the 20th century according to International Who's Who (2000), Karsh photographed 51. Among them were Audrey Hepburn, Elizabeth Taylor, Ernest Hemingway, Pablo Picasso, Walt Disney, Princess Elizabeth (future Queen Elizabeth II), Leonid Brezhnev, Nikita Khrushchev, Martin Luther King, Fidel Castro, Yuri Gagarin and others.

=== Gallery ===
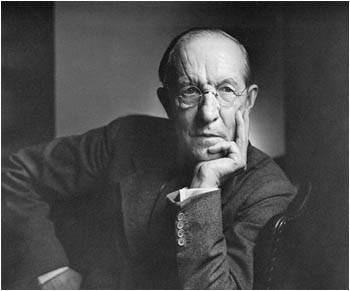
Duncan Campbell Scott (1933)

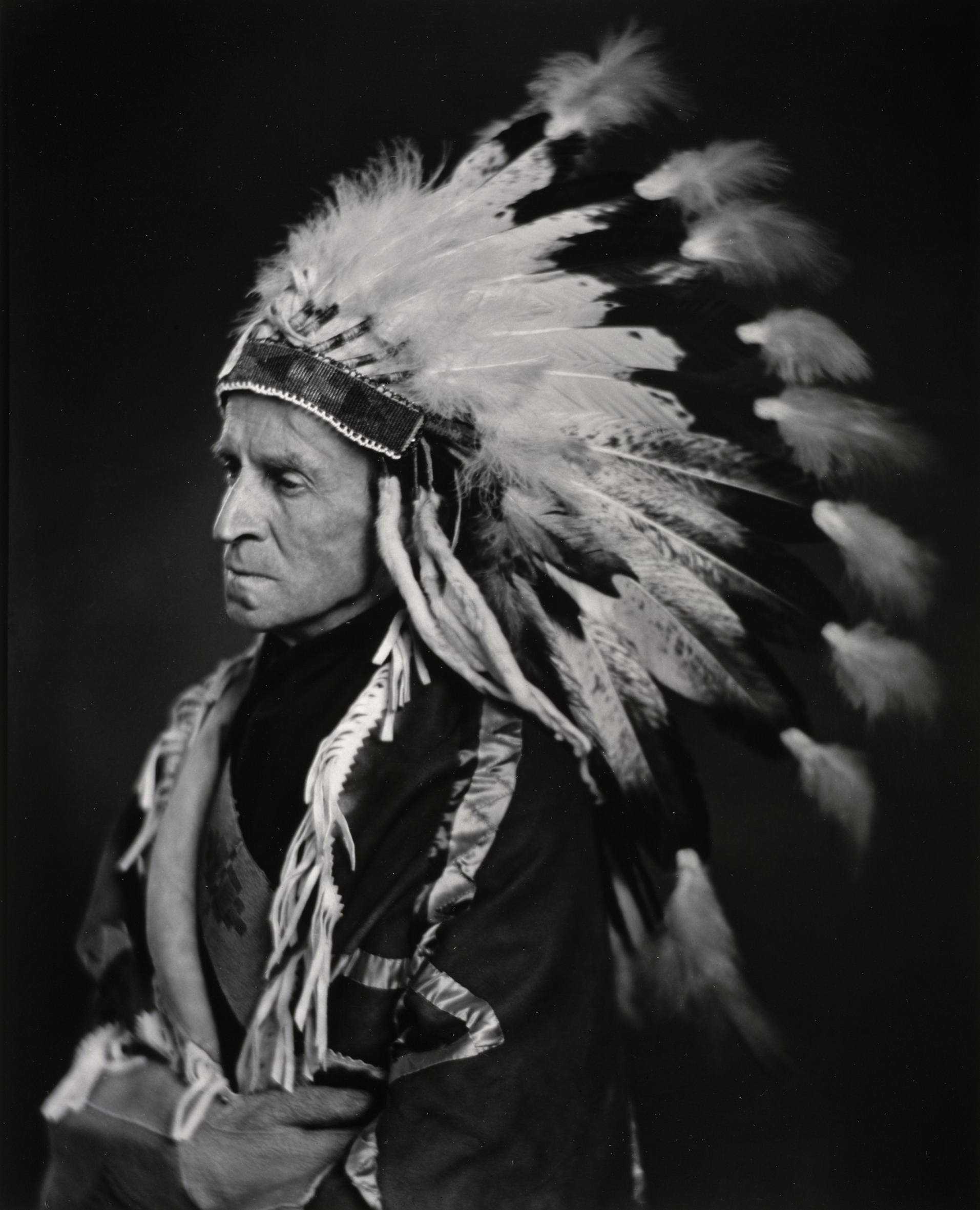
John Buchan (1937)

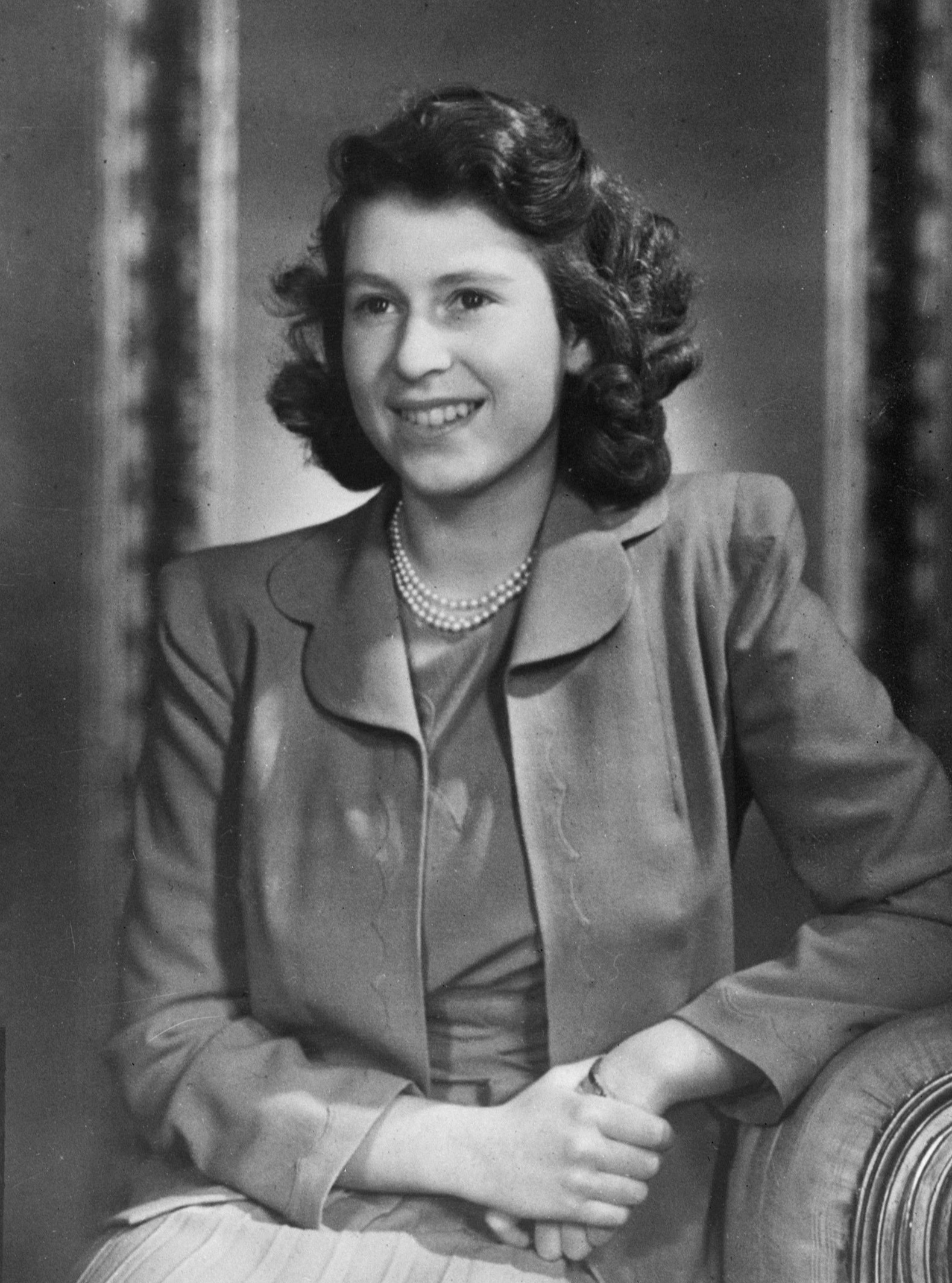
Princess Elizabeth (later Elizabeth II) (1943)

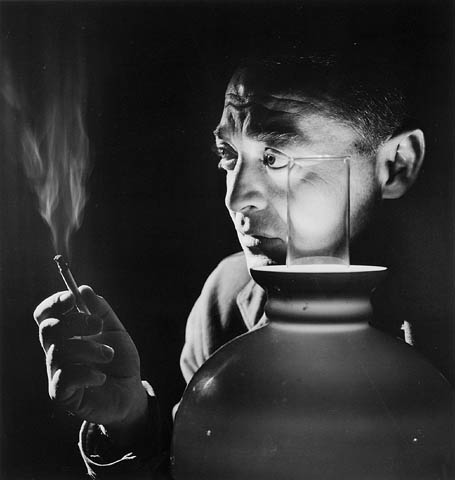
Peter Lorre (1946)

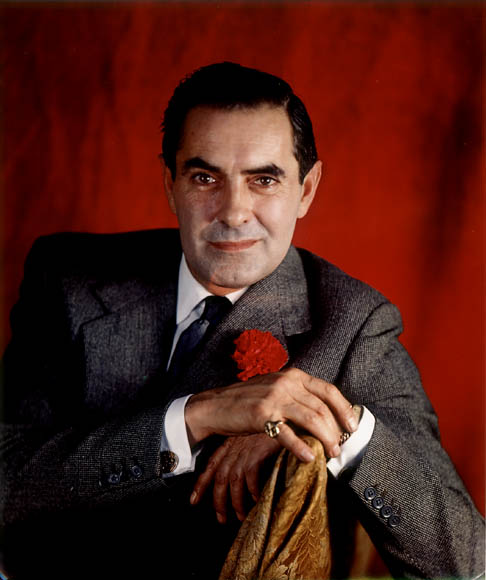
Tyrone Power (1946)

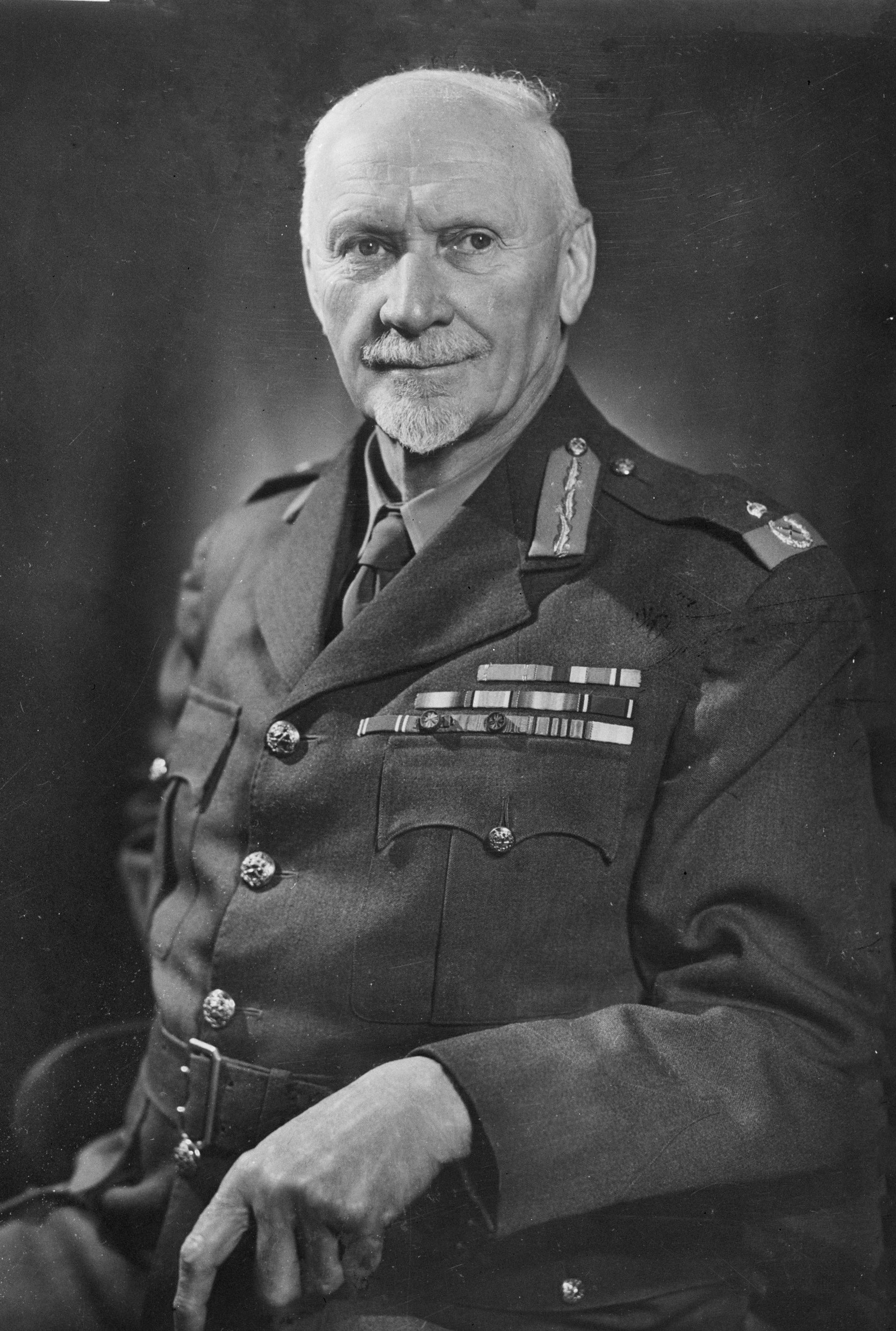
Jan Smuts (1947)

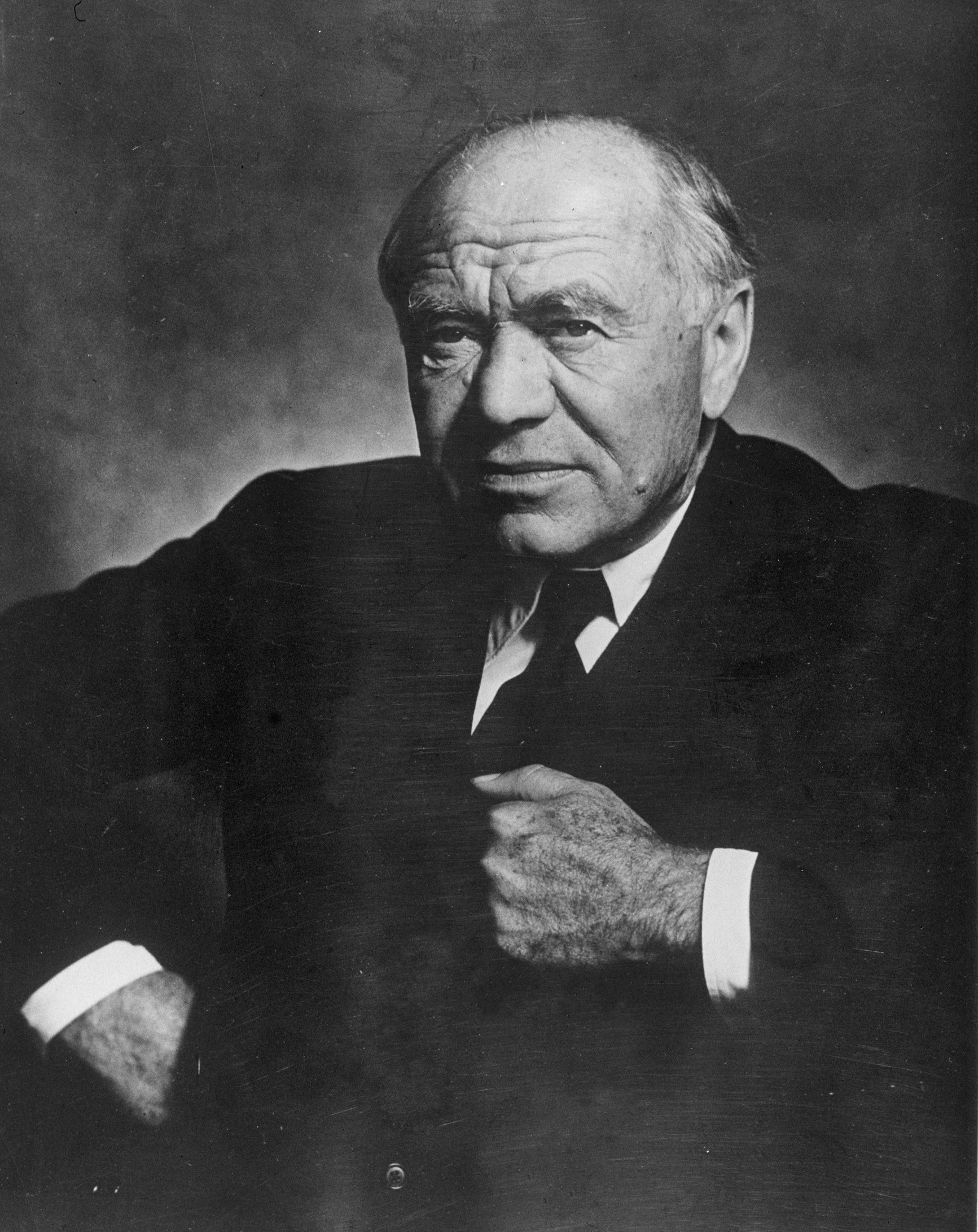
Lord Beaverbrook (1947)

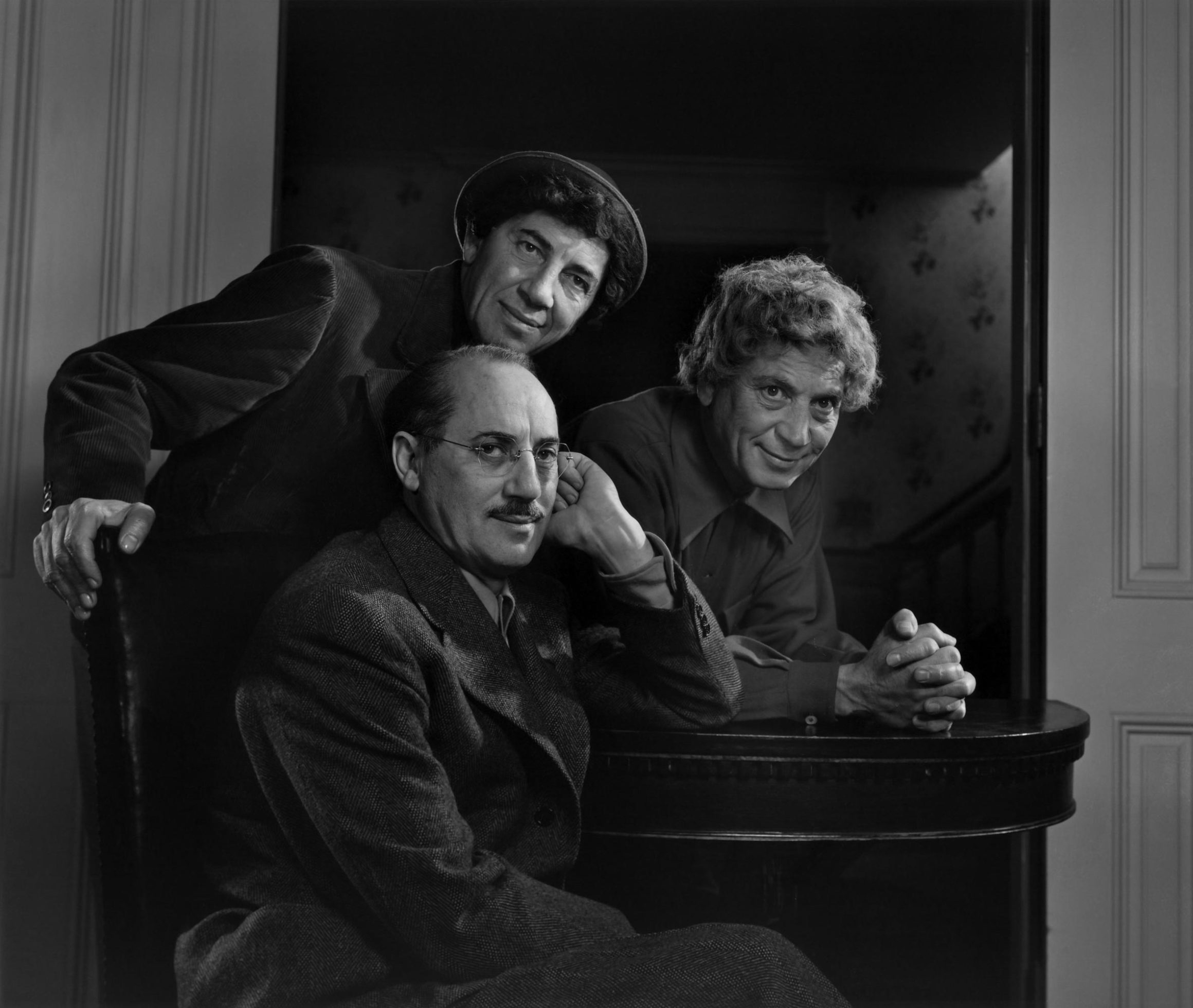
Marx Brothers (1948)

== Personal life ==
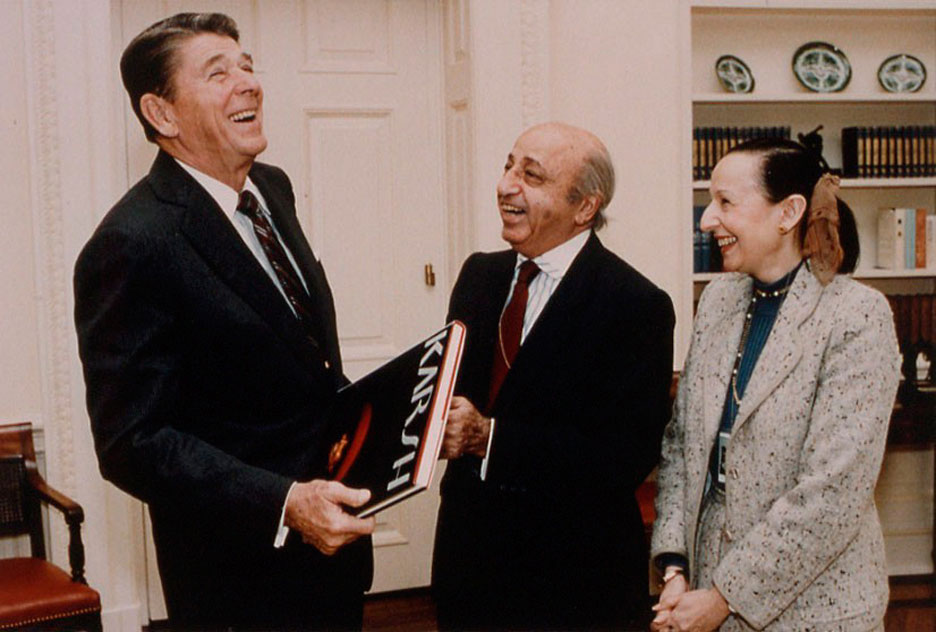
Yousuf and Estrellita Karsh with President Ronald Reagan at the White House in 1983

Karsh was one of the 26 people to become a citizen of Canada on January 3, 1947, at the first citizenship ceremony presided over by Chief Justice Thibaudeau Rinfret at the Supreme Court Building in Ottawa, shortly after Canadian citizenship was created.

Karsh's first marriage was to Solange Gauthier (1902−1961) in 1939. He met her at the Ottawa Little Theatre in 1933, where she was a performer. Gauthier was born in Tours, France and migrated to Canada as a young girl. They initially moved into her apartment and in 1940, into an Art Deco home called Little Wings on the Rideau River just outside Ottawa. She died in January 1961 of cancer. Gauthier was central to Karsh's work acting as both a muse and an invaluable business manager in charge of Karsh's promotions, publications, and studio.

His second marriage was to Estrellita Maria Nachbar, a medical writer 21 years his junior, in August 1962. Their wedding was officiated by Fulton J. Sheen, Auxiliary Bishop of the Catholic Archdiocese of New York. From 1972 to 1992 they lived in a third-floor suite at Château Laurier, Ottawa and maintained Little Wings and an apartment and studio in Manhattan. They had no children. Estrellita Karsh died in March 2025, at the age of 95.

=== Retirement and death ===
Karsh retired from making photographs in 1993 and moved to Boston in 1997. He died on July 13, 2002, at Brigham and Women's Hospital in Boston after complications following surgery. A private funeral was held in Ottawa. He was interred in Notre-Dame Cemetery in Ottawa.

== Recognition ==
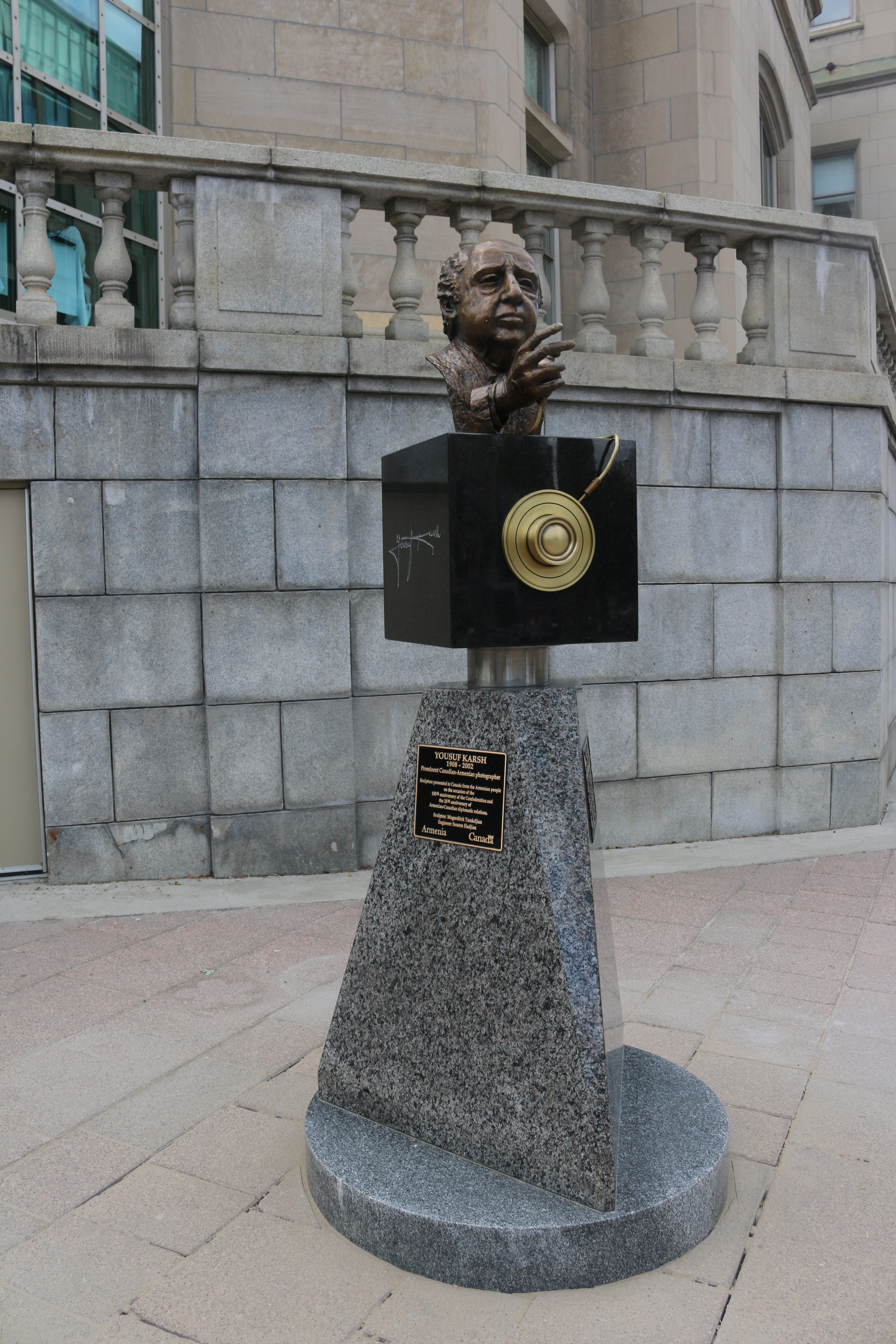
A bust of Karsh, a gift from Armenia, unveiled before Château Laurier, Ottawa, in 2017

Karsh has been recognized as Canada's leading portrait photographer. In general, he is recognized as one of the best-known and great portrait photographers of the 20th century. The Economist wrote upon his death that Karsh was "for half a century perhaps the greatest portrait photographer in the monumental manner". The website of the Governor General of Canada describes him as the "pre-eminent portrait photographer of the twentieth century". The Metropolitan Museum of Art described him as "one of the greatest portrait photographers of the twentieth century [who] achieved a distinct style in his theatrical lighting". The Canadian Encyclopedia noted that his portraits "have come to represent the public images of major international figures of politics, science, and culture in the twentieth century".

By the time of his death, his work was included in numerous museum collections including the Metropolitan Museum of Art, Museum of Modern Art (both in New York), National Gallery of Canada, National Portrait Gallery in London, National Museum of Modern Art in Tokyo, Art Institute of Chicago, Saint Louis Art Museum, Muscarelle Museum of Art, George Eastman Museum, and elsewhere. In 1987, the National Archives of Canada acquired the complete collection of Karsh items, including the negatives, prints and transparencies produced and retained by Karsh since 1933. The current Library and Archives Canada collection has 355,000 items in its Karsh collection, including all of his 150,000 negatives, kept at a facility in Gatineau, Quebec. Karsh's widow Estrellita gifted more than 100 photographic prints to the National Portrait Gallery in Washington, D.C.

He was a member of the Royal Canadian Academy of Arts and an honorary fellow of the Royal Photographic Society (UK).

On June 9, 2017, a bust of Karsh by Canadian-Armenian sculptor Megerditch Tarakdjian was unveiled before Château Laurier, Ottawa. It depicts Karsh with his famous camera and is a gift to Canada from the people of Armenia on the occasion of the 25th anniversary of the establishment of diplomatic relations between the two countries and the 150th anniversary of Canada. Among attendees were George Furey, the Speaker of the Senate, and Arif Virani, the Parliamentary Secretary to the Minister of Canadian Heritage.

The Karsh Award, dedicated to Yousuf and his brother Malak Karsh, is awarded by the City of Ottawa every two years to an established professional artist for outstanding artistic work in a photo-based medium.

== Awards ==
- Golden Plate Award of the American Academy of Achievement (1961)
- Order of Canada: Officer (1967), Companion (1990)
- Canada Council Medal (1965)
- Achievement and Life Award, Encyclopædia Britannica (1980)
- Gold Medal of Merit, National Society of Arts and Letters (1991)

Karsh was awarded honorary degrees from Dartmouth College (1961), Ohio University (1968), Tufts University (D.F.A., 1981), Syracuse University (D.F.A., 1986), Ohio State University (Doctor of Humane Letters, 1996), University of Hartford (1980), University of Massachusetts at Amherst (1979), Bishop's University (1969), Emerson College, Queen's University, Carleton University, Mount Allison University, Dawson College.

Karsh has been inducted into the International Photography Hall of Fame and Museum.

== Publications ==
- Faces of Destiny (1946)
- Portraits of Greatness (1959)
- In Search of Greatness (1962)
- Karsh Portfolio (1967)
- Faces of Our Time (1971)
- Karsh Portraits (1976)
- Karsh Canadians (1978)
- Karsh: A Fifty-Year Retrospective (1983)
- Karsh: American Legends (1992)
- Karsh: A Sixty-Year Retrospective (1996)
- Heroes of Light and Shadow (2001)
- Photography in Canada, 1839–1989: An Illustrated History by Sarah Bassnett and Sarah Parsons. Toronto: Art Canada Institute, 2023. ISBN 978-1-4871-0309-5
- Yousuf Karsh: Life & Work by Melissa Rombout. Toronto: Art Canada Institute, 2025. ISBN 978-1-4871-0369-9
